= Varian Rule =

Economics maxim

The Varian Rule holds that "A simple way to forecast the future is to look at what rich people have today; middle-income people will have something equivalent in 10 years, and poor people will have it in an additional decade." It is attributed to Google’s chief economist Hal Varian. Andrew McAfee first called it "the Varian Rule" in the Financial Times. An alternative interpretation, put forth by The Guardian writer Evgeny Morozov, riffing on William Gibson's famous quote about the future, is that "Luxury is already here – it’s just not very evenly distributed."

A more recent example is the Apple Watch which is initially offered as a luxury item, but if the Varian Rule holds, it will be more accessible in the near future according to Paul Krugman, Nobel Laureate, and blogger and columnist for The New York Times. But Jay Stanley, Senior Policy Analyst, of the American Civil Liberties Union Speech, Privacy & Technology Project disputes this conclusion based on personal privacy concerns.

== See also ==
- Boots theory
- Information Rules
- Technology adoption life cycle
- Trickle-down fashion
