= Mass-market theory =

Fashion marketing strategy

The mass-market theory, otherwise known as the trickle across, is a social fashion behavioral marketing strategy established by Dwight E. Robinson in 1958 and Charles W. King in 1963. Mass market is defined as, "a market coverage strategy in which a firm decides to ignore market segment differences and appeal to the whole market with one offer or one strategy."

In contrast to the trickle-down effect of fashion innovation, this theory states that fashion trickles across different social groups as opposed to upper to lower classes. Fashion innovation is not just confined to the upper class but can come from the innovators amongst the different socioeconomic groups. Thus, known as the trickle across theory. The theory's roots from new fashion adoption influences 'simultaneously by different social economic group and are contained within the different groups'.

The key dynamics of this theory are as follows:

- Adoption of new trends by all socioeconomic groups simultaneously
- Consumers preference from a large scale of existing trends
- Within each socioeconomic group there are fashion innovators that meet their preferred fashion demands
- The flow of fashion information and individual influence in the fashion world 'trickles across' each social economic group
- 'Vertical flow' remains evident, it is primarily in the fashion industry e.g. fashion editors

== The stages of mass market theory ==
George B. Sproles created 'the fashion mechanism, as a five-stage process propagated largely by social motivations' in the Mass Market Theory:

1. Adoption Leadership by "Consumer Fashion Change Agents: This stage is the introduction of the fashion innovation; these innovators are known for being 'leaders of collective taste' through social networking, invest in their interest of adopting new fashion as part of their stylish aspect.
2. The Social Visibility and Communicability Phase:In this stage the fashion goes through a "use cycle," the latest fashion is categorized as "new" and "novel," and will then develop to become highly detectable in the fashion industry portraying it as the 'latest fashion', disregarding present styles and trends.
3. Conformity Within and Across Social Systems: In this stage the 'latest fashion' will achieve a foundation through social networking to social acceptance by communication across social systems. Due to this 'diffusion process social contagion and social conformity then set new fashion tastes'.
4. Market and Social Saturation: If the latest fashion has made it to this stage, it will have attained its capital level of acceptance, therefore creating a form of "social saturation", therefore fashion is consistently utilized amongst the vast majority of individuals.
5. Decline and Obsolescence Forced By the Emergence of New Fashion Alternatives: The latest fashion will eventually come to a decline in the industry, removing it from being portrayed as 'new' and 'novel' due to the emerging trend or style that has been newly introduced as part of the "use" cycle. The fashion then experiences minimal usage and limited social acceptance eventually becoming obsolete.

The fundamental aspect is that the fashion industry is being majorly influenced by 'social communications and social influence'.

== Social economic groups fashion preferences ==
Juliet Ash, Elizabeth Wilson describes the difference in fashion preference as consumer choice widens and fashion becomes 'an integral part of identity formation'. More privileged societies tend to wear the same "classic" styles and disregard the latest fashions as they oppose an apparent "distinction of occupational achievement". The upper-middle classes desire clothing more "corresponding to wealth and high living". For the lower-middle classes tend to disregard "high style", for what is "daring" or "unusual". Individuals on a spending budget are more likely to purchase the 'latest trend' but frequently make their customized adaptions.

Ultimately, fashion opinion leaders influence the adoption and diffusion of fashions within a social group. When individuals play both roles of opinion, leader and innovator, they are referred to as "innovative communicators" within each social economic group.

== Implications of mass-market theory ==
Due to the ease of access to all the fashion segments in the industry and at all prices, the development in the textiles of garments along with the expansion in retail trade has eradicated the differentiating social economic class. This allowed more distinctions to incur in these segments, including 'make', retail 'brand', fabric, and quality.

Market trends derive in many social groups, including youthful urban subcultures. Certain trends to the fashion industry may appear to be more popular and successful within some social economic groups as opposed to other groups. Other fashion trends may even fail to all types of social economic groups. "The newest styles become adopted in different ways. This can be through the process of customization in which certain elements become more important than others and is solely dictated by the consumer." In today's fashion industry it has become increasingly challenging for fashion firms achieve consumer satisfaction due to the constant and rapid development of trends and styles.

== See also ==
- Diffusion (business)
- Trickle-up fashion
