= Court shoe =

Type of shoe with low-cut front

A court shoe (British English) or pump (American English) is a shoe with a low-cut front, or vamp, with either a shoe buckle or a black bow as ostensible fastening. Deriving from the 17th- and 18th-century dress shoes with shoe buckles, the vamped pump shape emerged in the late 18th century. By the turn of the 19th century, shoe buckles were increasingly replaced by black bows, which has remained the contemporary style for men's formal wear, leather or patent leather evening pumps ever since. This latter style is sometimes also called an opera pump or opera slipper.

The construction of pumps is simple, using a whole-cut leather top with a low vamp, lined with either quilted silk or plain leather, trimmed with braid at the opening. The full leather sole is either glued onto the bottom, common on cheaper styles, or sewn, as on more costly bespoke styles still made traditionally, using a shallow slit to lift a flap of leather around the edge to recess and hide the stitching. The sole is, as on ordinary shoes, several layers of leather put together. The bow is made of grosgrain, or any ribbed silk, in a pinched or flat form.

For women, pumps with a strap across the instep are called Mary Janes. Pumps may have an ankle strap.

== Menswear ==
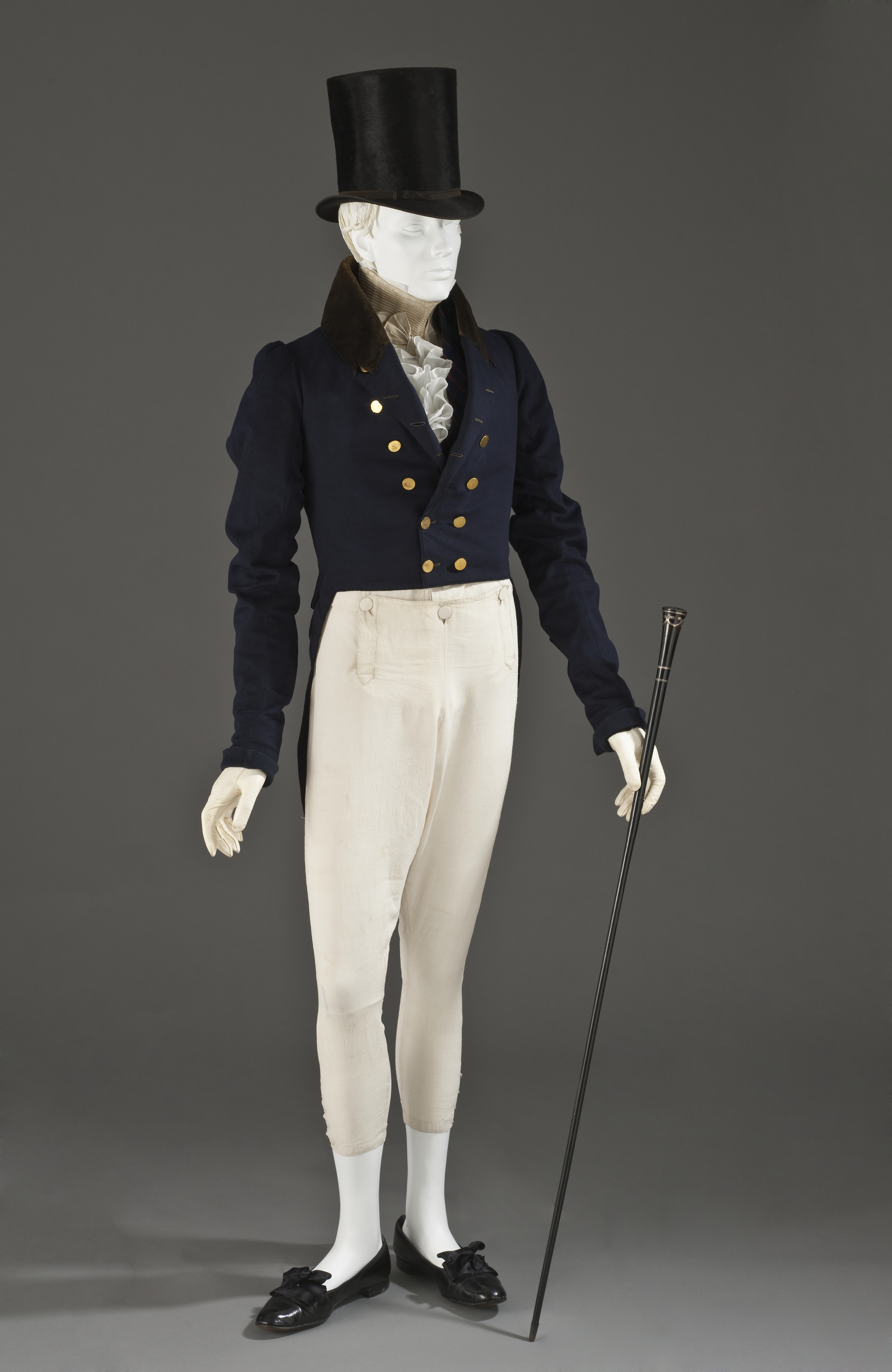
A man's formal wear in the late 1820s

In the Regency period, during the day upper-class gentlemen in western Europe wore dress boots, and boots or pumps by night, which accompanied silk knee-high stockings and breeches. The shoes originally had silver cut-steel buckles, but these were removed by the influence of Beau Brummell, and a square grosgrain bow was added. By Victorian times, evening footwear was pumps when there would be dancing or music (hence the name opera shoe or opera slipper), and patent leather dress boots otherwise. Pumps remained as standard with evening full dress until the 1930s. At that time, the dress boot was also going out of fashion, as laced shoes began to be worn at all times.

Even though it now survives in much the same form as it was at the start of the 19th century (though it is occasionally now worn with plain, not patent or calf) pumps have been largely displaced by Oxfords, perhaps because of an effeminate image and the declining use of white tie. It remains acceptable (though rare) with black tie, and, since formal boots are now hardly ever worn, pumps are standard with white tie, their only remaining common use. They are still preferred with formal wear by many leaders of style. The original versions worn with cut-steel buckles are still worn as part of British court uniform and dress.

== Womenswear ==
Pumps for women are usually heeled. The shape has varied through time. In the UK, a closed toe and wide (non-stiletto) heel have been worn by the very fashion-conscious, but most still wore stilettos of mainly 'kitten' height to medium height.

In the UK, outside the fashion trade, the term "pumps" would normally imply flat or low-heel dancing or ballerina pumps, or even rubber-soled canvas plimsolls. In the U.S., "pumps" exclusively refers to women's shoes with a kitten or higher heel. The use of the word "pumps" has been in use in the English-speaking world since at least 1719, when it is mentioned in Daniel Defoe's novel Robinson Crusoe. (Note: "...so I resolved to go as before, when the tide was down, and I did so, only that I stripped before I went from my hut, having nothing on but a checkered shirt and a pair of linen drawers and a pair of pumps on my feet". p. 57) (Note: Registry of Deeds, Dublin. Memorial: 208-177-137906. Registered 23/01/1761. "A Memorial of an Indenture of Lease dated the twelfth day of August one thousand seven hundred and sixty made by the Revd. William Pountney of Nangor in the County of Dublin, Clerk to Edward McGowan of Christ Church Yard in said County, Shoemaker, whereby said William demised to said Edward all that Lott or piece of Ground situate in Christ Church Yard, Dublin whereon one house is built which was lately in the Tenure of Mr. Waters bounding on the East to Ground belonging to the Chantor of Christ Church… [..] Paying the rent of eight pounds with a pair of womans pumps every twenty fifth day of March over and above taxes to commence from the...")

Pumps can be made from any material, but traditional patent leather is popular. Pumps are mostly worn with a suit or a uniform, but are also worn with formal and informal dresses, skirts, trousers, and jeans.

Pumps are also part of the costume of a ballroom dancer. They are made of satin, usually tan, though other colors are made as well, and worn on both the competition and practice floors.

Recent studies highlight the relationship between foot health issues and the choice of footwear. One such study found that the footwear choices of young women in 2012 were activity-specific and participants chose the style and design of shoes related to the image they wanted to portray. Despite the connection between some types of footwear with foot pain or foot health issues, young women apparently were not influenced by such concerns in making footwear choices.

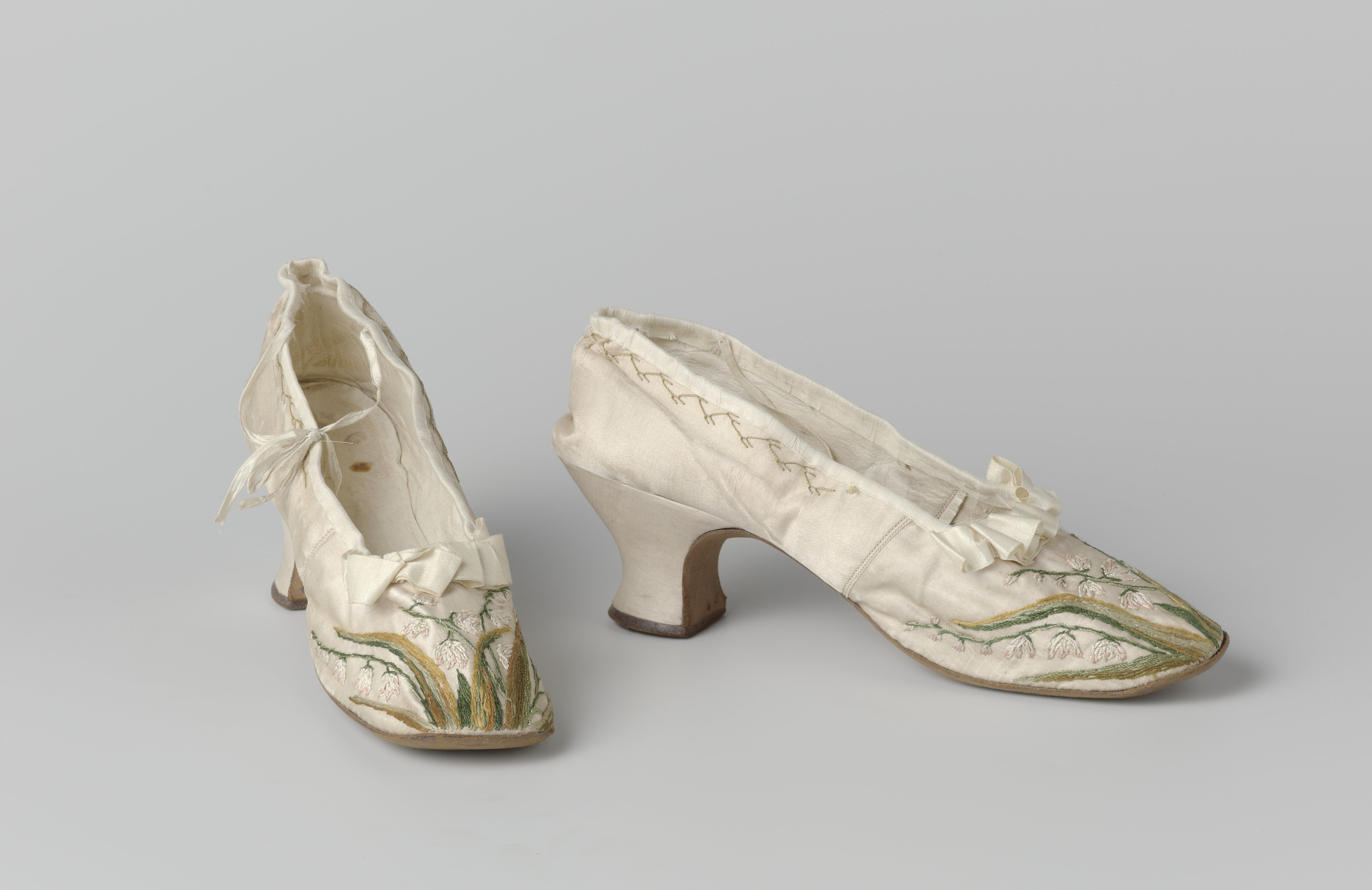
A pair of court shoes for women from c. 1881

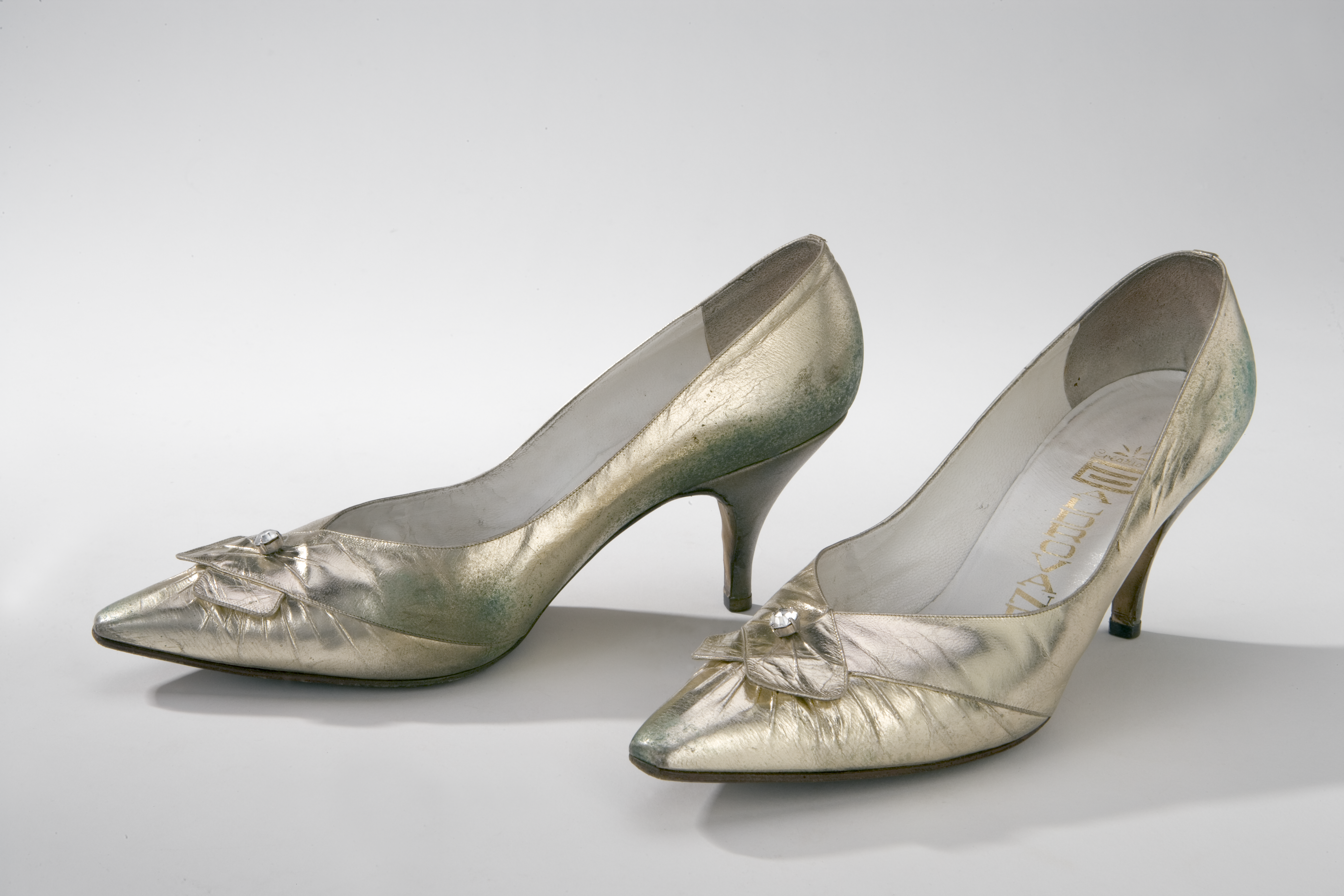
A pair of 20th-century court shoes for women

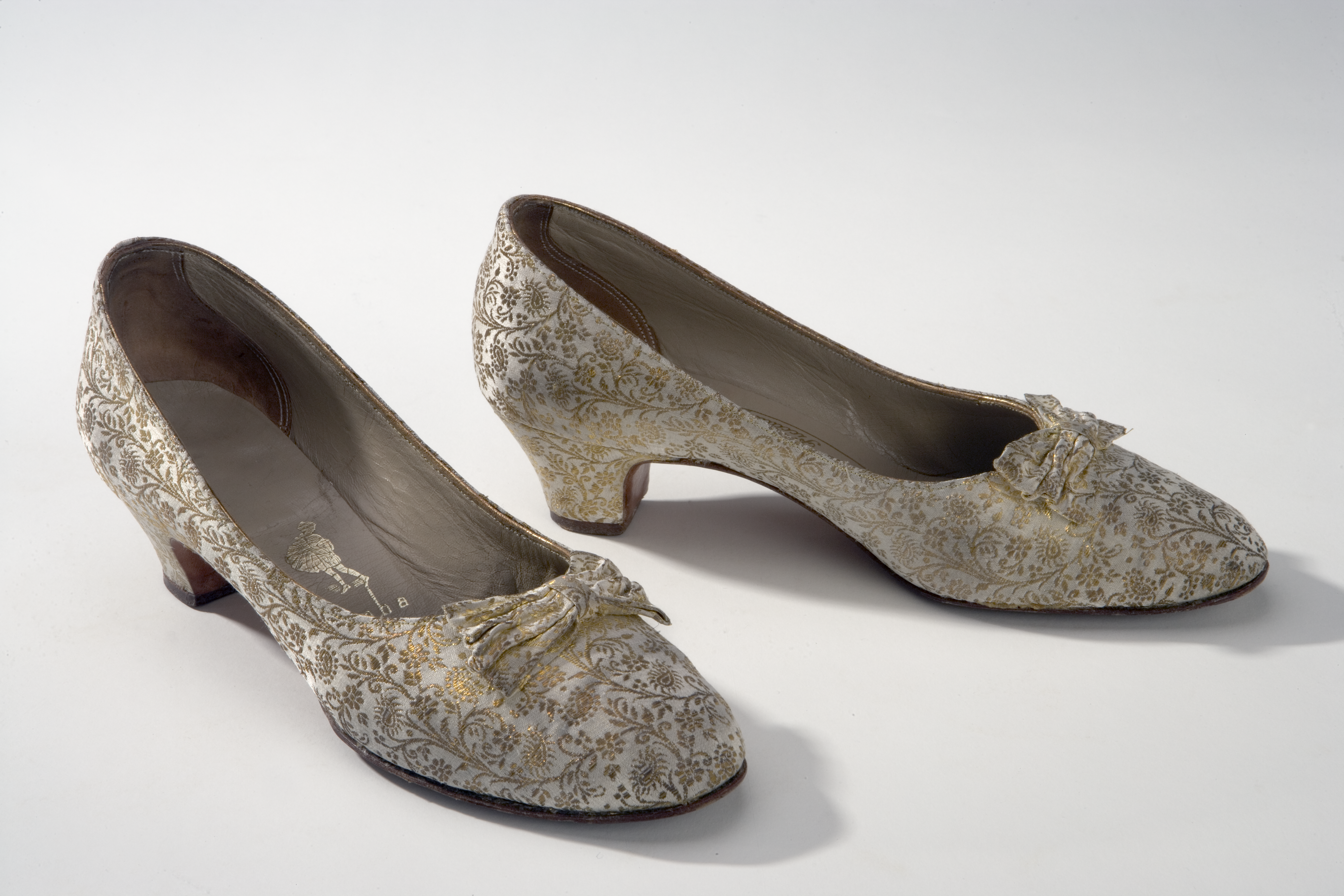
20th-century court shoes for women

== See also ==
- Dress code
- List of shoe styles

== General bibliography ==
- Antongiavanni, Nicholas (2006). The Suit: A Machiavellian Approach to Men's Style. HarperCollins. ISBN 978-0-06-089186-2.
- Flusser, Alan (1985). Clothes and the Man: The Principles of Fine Men's Dress. Villard. ISBN 0-394-54623-7.
- Flusser, Alan (2002). Dressing the Man: Mastering the Art of Permanent Fashion. HarperCollins. ISBN 0-06-019144-9.
