= Trickle-down theory =

"Trickle-down theory" or "Trickle-down effect" can refer to two different but related concepts:

- Trickle-down fashion, a model of product adoption in marketing
- Trickle-down economics, a theory for tax cuts on high incomes and business activity
