= Carl Shapiro =

American economist

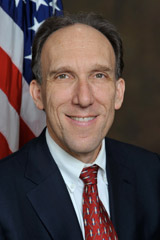
- Shapiro c. 2009–2011
- Born: March 20, 1955 (age 71); Austin, Texas, U.S.
- Occupations: Economist; academic
- Years active: 1995–present

Academic background
- Education: Massachusetts Institute of Technology (BS, BS, PhD); University of California, Berkeley (MA)
- Doctoral advisor: Richard L. Schmalensee

Academic work
- Discipline: Microeconomics
- School or tradition: Neoclassical economics
- Institutions: Haas School of Business at the University of California, Berkeley
- Website: Information at IDEAS / RePEc

Carl Shapiro (born March 20, 1955) is an American economist and professor at the University of California, Berkeley, Haas School of Business. He is the co-author, along with Hal Varian of Information Rules: A Strategic Guide to the Network Economy, published by the Harvard Business School Press. He served on former US president Barack Obama's Council of Economic Advisers from 2011 to 2012.

Shapiro served as Deputy Assistant Attorney General for Economics in the Antitrust Division of the U.S. Department of Justice (1995–1996). He is a Senior Consultant with Charles River Associates and has consulted extensively for a wide range of private clients as well as for the U.S. Department of Justice and the Federal Trade Commission.

Shapiro was again the Deputy Assistant Attorney General for Economics of the Antitrust division of the Justice Department from 2009 to 2011.

Shapiro holds a BS in mathematics and a BS in economics from the Massachusetts Institute of Technology, an MA in mathematics from the University of California, Berkeley and a PhD in economics from the Massachusetts Institute of Technology.

Shapiro has written multiple scholarly articles on standard-essential patents (SEPs).

== Publications ==
- Information Rules (Harvard Business Press 1999; co-authored with Hal R. Varian)
- Hal R. Varian; Joseph Farrell; Carl Shapiro (December 23, 2004). The Economics of Information Technology: An Introduction. Cambridge University Press. ISBN 978-0-521-60521-2.
