= Trickle-up fashion =

Fashion theory

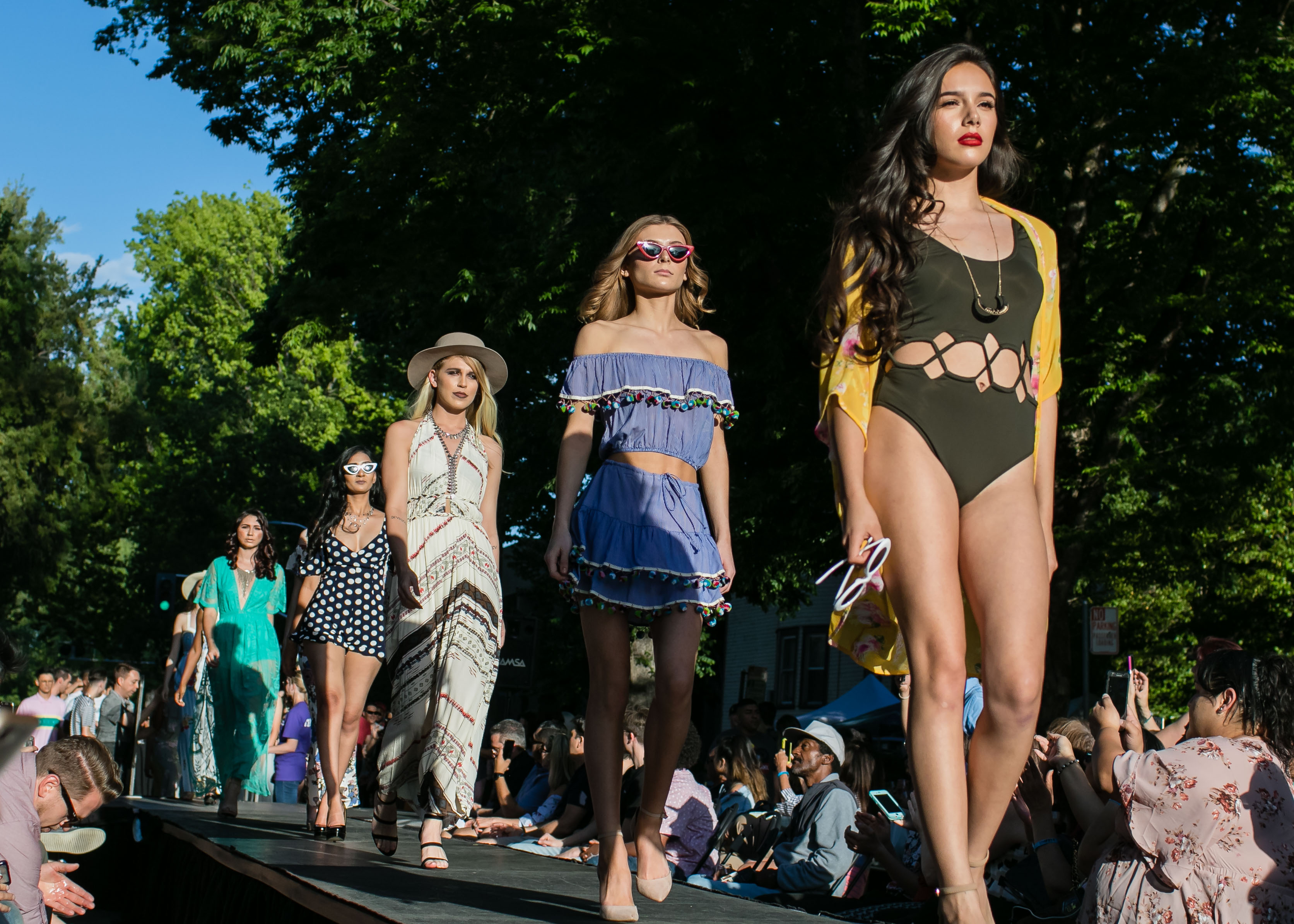
Women on a catwalk

The trickle-up effect in the fashion field, also known as bubble-up pattern, is an innovative fashion theory first described by Paul Blumberg in the 1970s. This effect describes when new trends are found on the streets, showing how innovation flows from the lower class to upper class. It is in contrast with classical theories of fashion consumption, such as those of Georg Simmel and Thorstein Veblen, who theorize that the upper classes are the ones who dictate the fashion flow.

== Origins ==
Trickle-down fashion can be seen as the antithesis of the trickle-up effect. Although the trickle-down effect itself has only first appeared in the 1950s, the concept can be traced back to sociologist Georg Simmel and economist Thorstein Veblen. Trickle-down theory describes the inability of the lower social classes to develop fashion style of their own, leaving only the upper social classes to influence the fashion trend. Lower social classes are therefore left to imitate the fashion trend of the rich. In contrast to this, the trickle-up effect describes an upward diffusion in which fashion styles from lower classes are adopted by the upper classes.

In opposition to the downward diffusion of fashion in earlier years, we now encounter a phenomenon in which trends are more likely to be defined by the lower social strata. It was first described by Paul Blumberg during the 1970s in the United States: "[...] there has been in the last decade more percolating up from the bottom than trickling down from the top". Blumberg elaborates on this by stating that a variety of standards in fashion have been set by the déclassé and anti-class youth by using new styles, like long hair or a shabby chic, to not only tease the status symbols of higher classes but also spreading their styles into the fashion elite.

== Example cases ==
=== T-shirt ===
The T-shirt, from the Middle Age to the early 19th century, had traditionally been considered as a piece of undergarment worn by sailors and blue-collar workers.

American actors Marlon Brando and James Dean helped shift the perception of the T-shirt, thanks to their appearance with the garment in popular movies. Brando and Dean helped redefine the T-shirt as legitimate outerwear and a deliberately rebellious fashion statement. The T-shirt appears in collections of both low and high-end brands, due to its versatility and the ease of imposing messages on it. A significant example of the t-shirt as messenger is the "anti-nuclear" T-shirt worn by designer Katharine Hamnett during a meeting with Margaret Thatcher or the piece "We all should be feminists" presented at Dior Fashion show in 2016.

=== Jeans ===
Initially, Levi Strauss' jeans were simply sturdy trousers worn by factory workers, miners, farmers, and cattlemen throughout the North American West. After James Dean popularized them in the movie Rebel Without a Cause, wearing jeans became a symbol of youth rebellion during the 1950s. During the 1960s the wearing of jeans became more acceptable, and by the 1970s it had become general fashion in the United States for casual wear.

Examples of intentional denim distressing strictly to make them more fashionable can be seen as early as 1935 in Vogue's June issue. Michael Belluomo, editor of Sportswear International Magazine, Oct/Nov 1987, P. 45, wrote that in 1965, Limbo, a boutique in the New York East Village, was "the first retailer to wash a new pair of jeans to get a used, worn effect, and the idea became a hit." He continued, "[Limbo] hired East Village artists to embellish the jeans with patches, decals, and other touches, and sold them for $200." In the early 1980s the denim industry introduced the stone-washing technique developed by GWG also known as "Great Western Garment Co." Donald Freeland of Edmonton, Alberta pioneered the method, which helped to bring denim to a larger and more versatile market. Acceptance of jeans continued through the 1980s and 1990s. Originally an esoteric fashion choice, in the 2010s jeans may be seen being worn by men and women of all ages.

=== Punk style ===
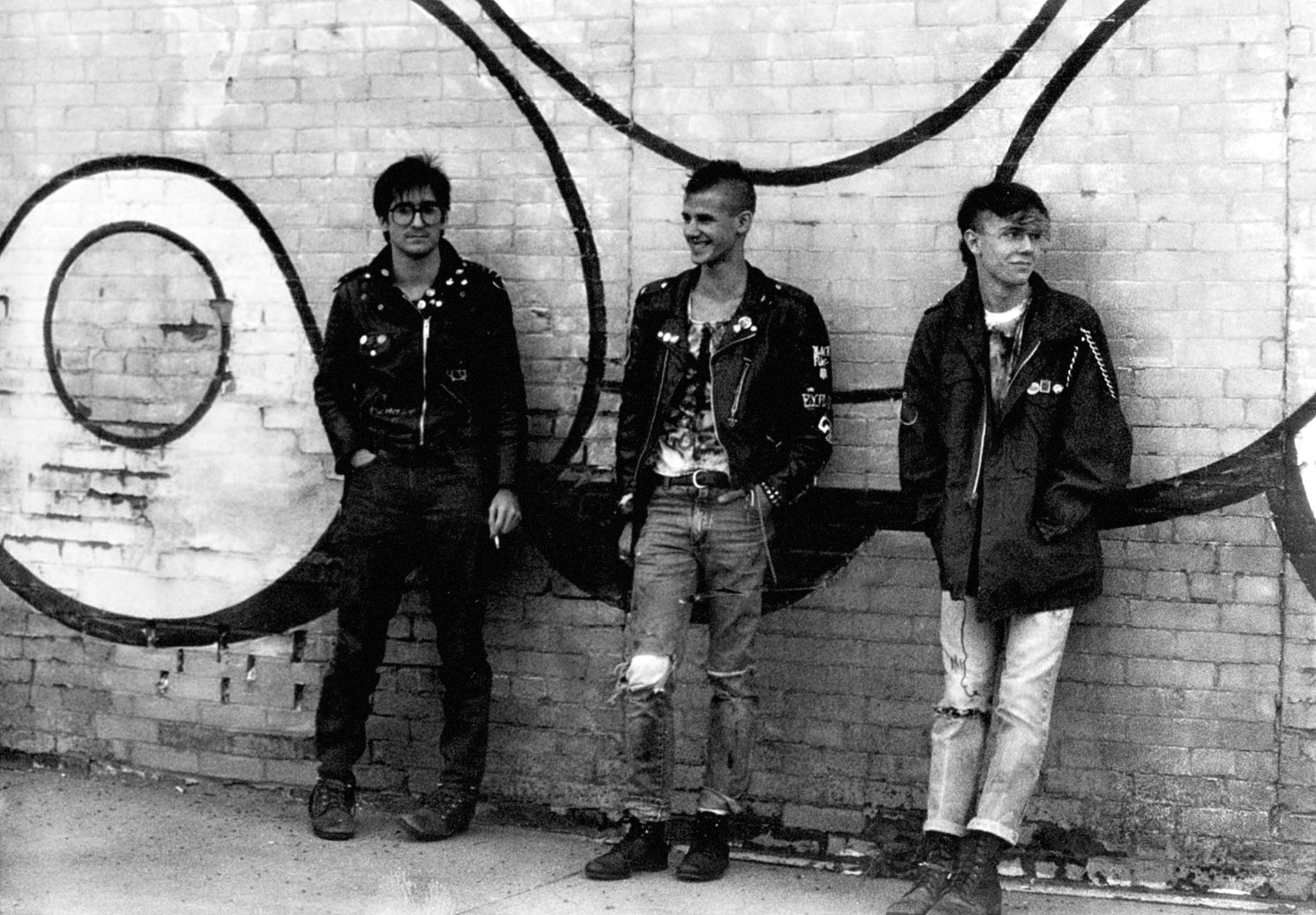
Punks on brick wall c1984

Punk subculture appeared for the first time in the UK in the 1970s. Punk style started as a youth movement, in which the concept of "anti-fashion" was a main feature, due to its origin in the lower classes. Vivienne Westwood was the first designer who used this concept in her collections, which gave her the title "The Mother of Punk". She opened a popular shop in London, which was loved by the celebrities and music stars of the time, including punk band Sex Pistols. Studded chokers, tattoos, chains and ripped jeans were the main features of the punk aesthetic. In 1977, this style started to be widely appreciated thanks to Zandra Rhodes' designs, that added punk elements on elegant gowns: punk chic was born.

=== 1970s and hippie fashion ===
Born in the 1970s, the hippie style shifted from being just worn by the lower and middle-class alternative youth to a widespread trend. From 2012 it had a huge comeback with looks made of flow-y-tops and skirts paired with knit shrugs. An example is Ralph Lauren's spring collection (2011), which presented skirts with higher waist with the flow-y details towards the bottom. Hippie fashion, today also known as boho-chic, has entered the popular imagination as a trendy style thanks to popular figures like actress Vanessa Hudgens, and themed events like the Coachella Valley Music and Arts Festival.

=== 1980s and yuppies fashion ===
Another example of trickling-up in fashion is given by the revival of some iconic 1980s yuppie-inspired pieces of clothing like kitten heels, pastel colors, white commuter sneakers, power shoulder and high waisted pants with skinny belts by major fashion houses like Ralph Lauren, Tory Burch, Dr. Martens, and Tibi.

=== 1990s and grunge influence ===
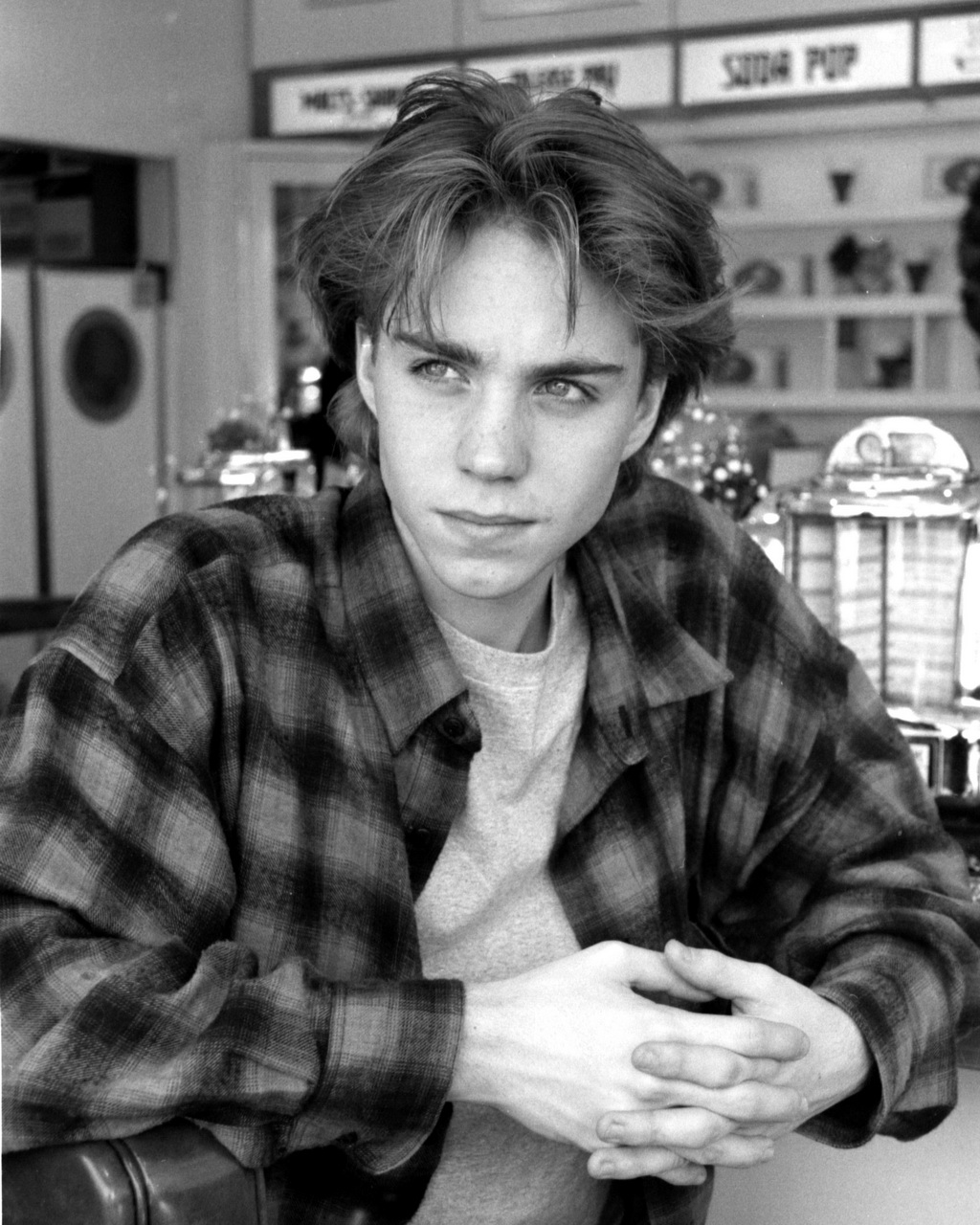
Jonathan Brandis

In the early 1990s, what would come to be known as grunge fashion, characterized by oversized plaid flannel shirts, ripped jeans, combat boots, choker necklaces, and dark colored sheer tights, would be mainstreamed as a consequence of the huge success of Seattle bands such as Nirvana, Pearl Jam, and Soundgarden. The idea of wearing clothes that seemed inexpensive and already worn was re-proposed in the 1993 Spring collections by avant-garde designers like Marc Jacobs, Christian Francis Roth, and Anna Sui, causing disarray in the fashion industry.

=== Military-inspired clothing ===
Military-inspired clothing first appeared after World War II when lower and middle-class young people started to buy pea jackets and khaki pants as a sign of independence and protest against war. The trend survived, as Chanel, Balmain, Marc Jacobs, Celine, Hermes, Lanvin, D&G and Burberry are some of the fashion houses that from 2010 proposed military-inspired collections. Combat boots, leather studded bracelets, and double-breasted jackets with rows of buttons are pieces that can be easily found both in luxury runaways and in fast fashion chains.

== Role of digital culture ==
While influencing the fashion industry was out of reach for an ordinary consumer, social media started to change this former two-dimensional, one-sided industry. Social media networks formed platforms which gave new possibilities to people with a special interest in fashion; influencers meanwhile play an important role in agencies' and brands' marketing strategies. Social media fashion icons can be seen as an example of the trickle-up effect in fashion, as they are able to form trends and influence fashion by presenting their own fashion taste on free platforms like Instagram or Facebook. An example is Italian influencer Chiara Ferragni, who started with a small blog and became a fashion icon who runs a fashion business.

=== Key factors of social media ===
Fashion is currently a two-way route due to web digital space. Before the digital era people had to go physically to Fashion weeks, but after digitalization people interested in fashion can participate through social media platforms. Social media has carried diversity to the industry, as anyone can present themselves and follow those who relate to them in body or lifestyle. Hashtags like #winterscarves, #millennials, or #winterfashion allow users to easily find virtually any trend.

=== From streetwear to the mainstream ===
Veblen's trickle-down theory was related to 19th and 20th century society's desire to climb the social ladder by imitating the style of the rich. The advent and spread of social media made it possible for people not on the top of the social scale to be noticed and gave them the ability to express their style from anywhere. Designers now have online stores as main sales channels and maintain an active social media presence. Digital space is now a key place for brands to showcase collections, and to develop personalities and relationships with customers. The history of trickle-up fashion and the influence of the digital world brought an evolution to the fashion industry. As particular styles began to draw attention on the streets and digital space trends, top designers incorporated them into their collections: an example is Gucci's collaboration with a famous graffiti artist, or retailers such as Urban Outfitters, where street fashion is sold at high-end prices.
