= Removable heel =

Shoe heel which can be modified

Removable heel is a concept that allows the wearer to easily change heels of a shoe during the day in order to change height, color or shape of the heel.

Reducing heel height might lessen pain and the health effects of high-heels.

== History ==
Removable heels were first imagined in 1956 by French shoe designer André Perugia
