= Insolia =

Insolia is a component in the design of the high-heeled shoe designed by New Hampshire podiatrist Dr. Howard Dananberg. It reduces the pain associated with wearing high-heeled shoes by adjusting weight distribution back toward the heel through altering the geometry of the insole, rather than with padding.

== Concept ==
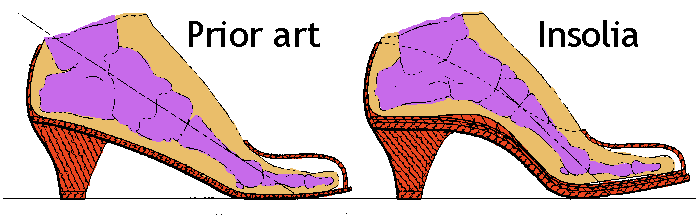
Visual of weight concentration shift

With ordinary high-heeled shoes, the body weight is concentrated to the toes; this can make the wearer uncomfortable. The Insolia design shifts some of this weight back to the heel in an attempt to reduce high heel foot pain. The weight shift is accomplished by altering the geometry of the insole.

== Technology ==
A shoe with the Insolia insert

The original commercial implementation was an insole board that combined the structural elements of a high heel insole board with the patented Insolia contours. In early 2005, HBN Shoe developed the current implementation: an insole supplement that modifies a traditional high heel to give it the Insolia weight shifting geometry. This implementation is protected in the EU by one issued patent and other patents are pending in the US, the EU, and elsewhere. Insolia now also markets an after-market version that can be easily installed in shoes by consumers via its website.
