= High-heeled shoe =

Footwear that raises the heel of the wearer's foot significantly higher than the toes

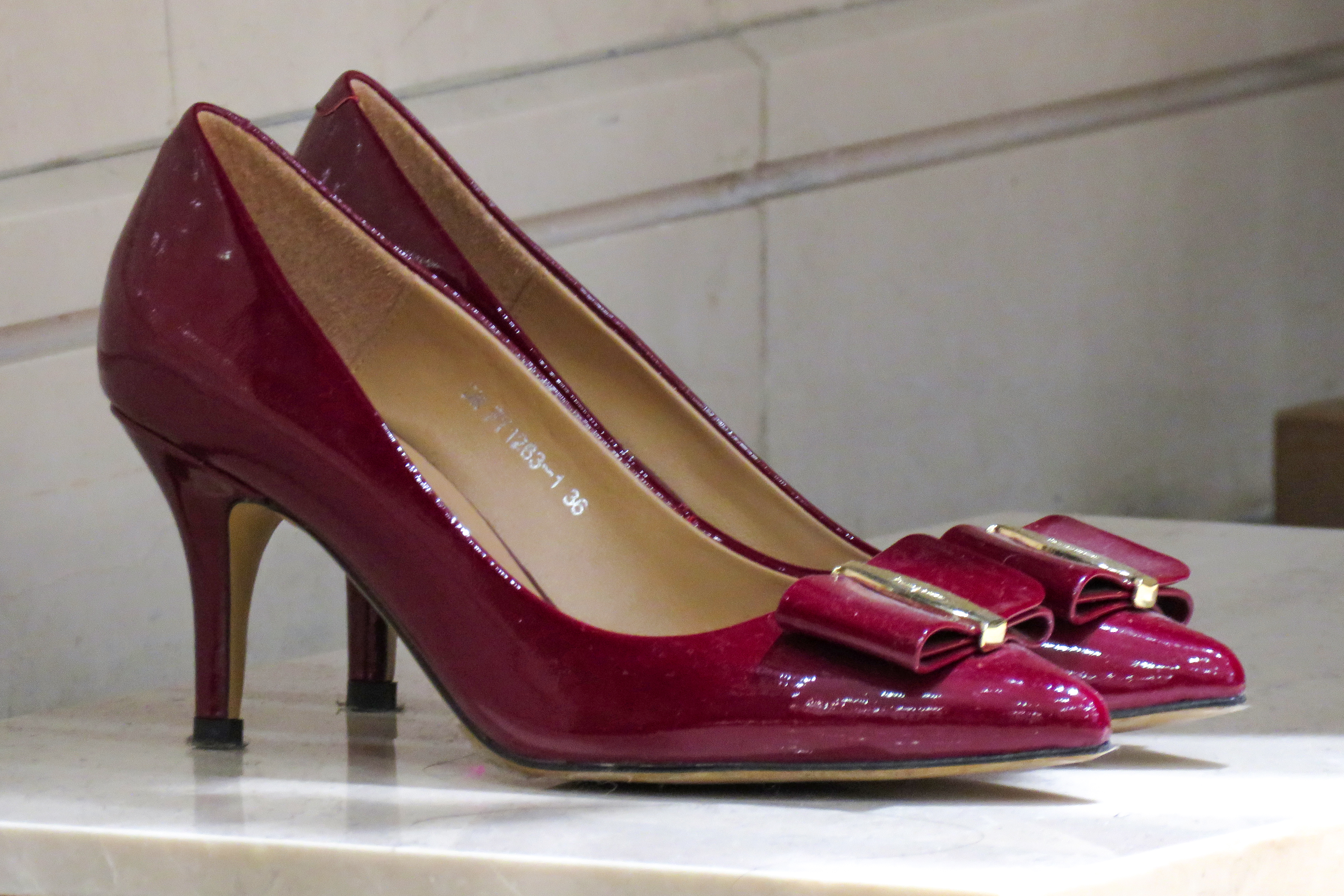
A pair of high-heeled court shoes

High-heeled shoes, also known as high heels (colloquially shortened to heels), are a type of shoe with an upward-angled sole. The heel in such shoes is raised above the ball of the foot. High heels cause the legs to appear longer, make the wearer appear taller, and accentuate the calf muscle.

There are many types of high heels in varying styles, heights, and materials. High heels have been used in various ways to convey nationality, professional affiliation, gender, and social status. High heels have been an important statement piece of fashion for centuries in the West.

High heels spread from equestrian origins with the 10th century Persian galesh to wider fashion use. In early 17th-century Europe, high heels were a sign of masculinity and high social status. Towards the end of the century, the trend began to spread to women's fashion. By the 18th century, high-heeled shoes had split along gender lines. By this time, heels for men were chunky squares attached to riding boots or tall formal dress boots, while women's high heels were narrow, pointy, and often attached to slipper-like dress shoes (similar to modern heels). By the 20th century, high heels with a slim profile represented femininity; however, a thick high heel on a boot or clog was still socially acceptable for men. Until the 1950s, shoe heels were typically made of wood, but in recent years they have been made of a variety of materials including leather, suede, and plastic.

Wearing high heels is associated with greater risk of falls, musculoskeletal pain, development of foot deformities, and varicose veins.

== History ==
=== Pre-18th century ===
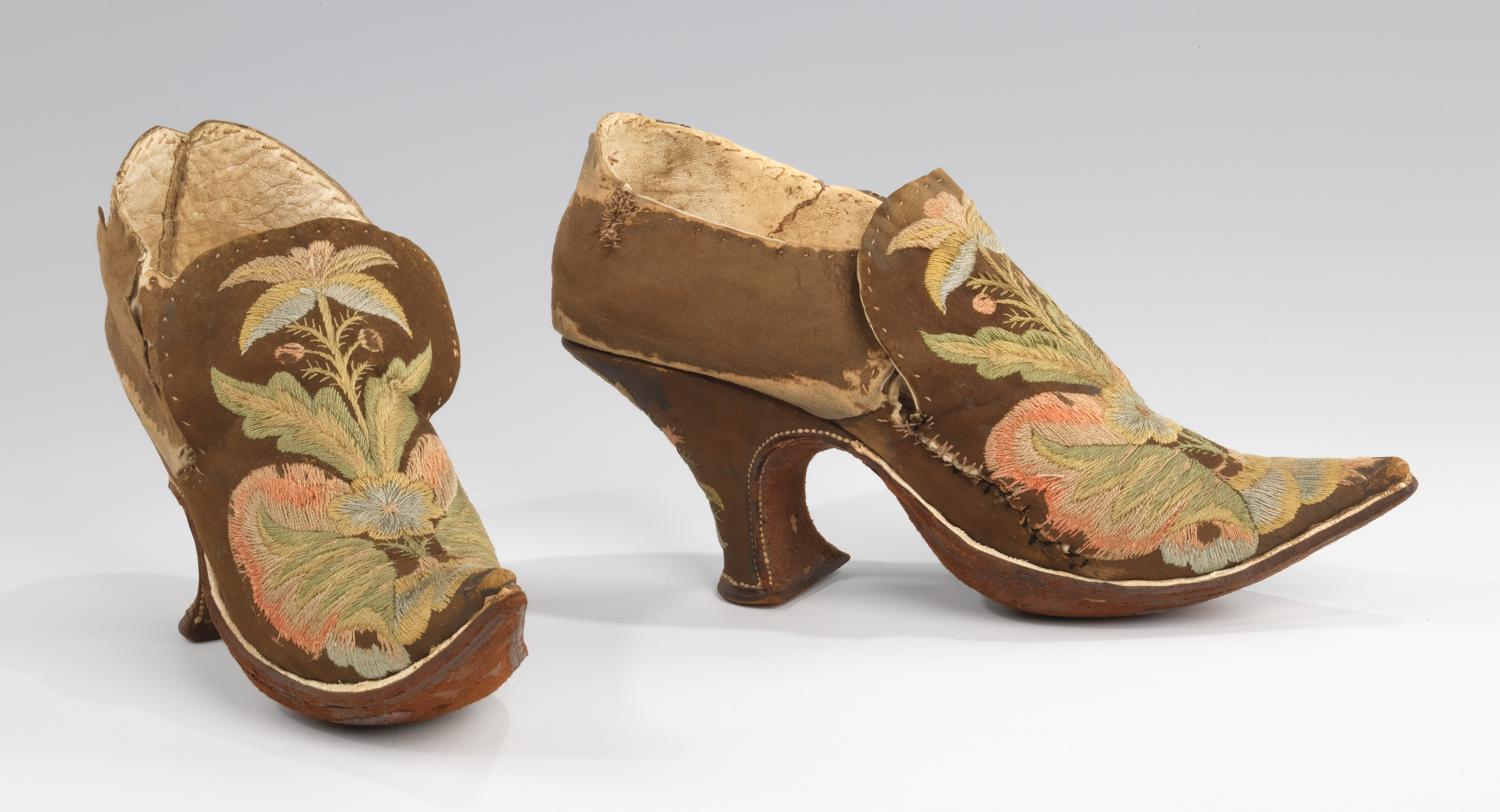
European heeled shoes from c. 1690

Starting in the 10th century, the Persian cavalry wore galesh, a kind of boot with heels, to ensure their feet stayed in the stirrups. Heeled shoes also ensured the safety of Persian arrow-shooting riders, while standing up on galloping horses. This utility of the heel for horseback riders has been preserved in the Western cowboy boot. Wearing heels became associated with wealth because of its traditional connection with horseback riding, which was expensive and time-consuming. This practical use of the heel set the standard for most horseback riding shoes throughout history and into the present day.

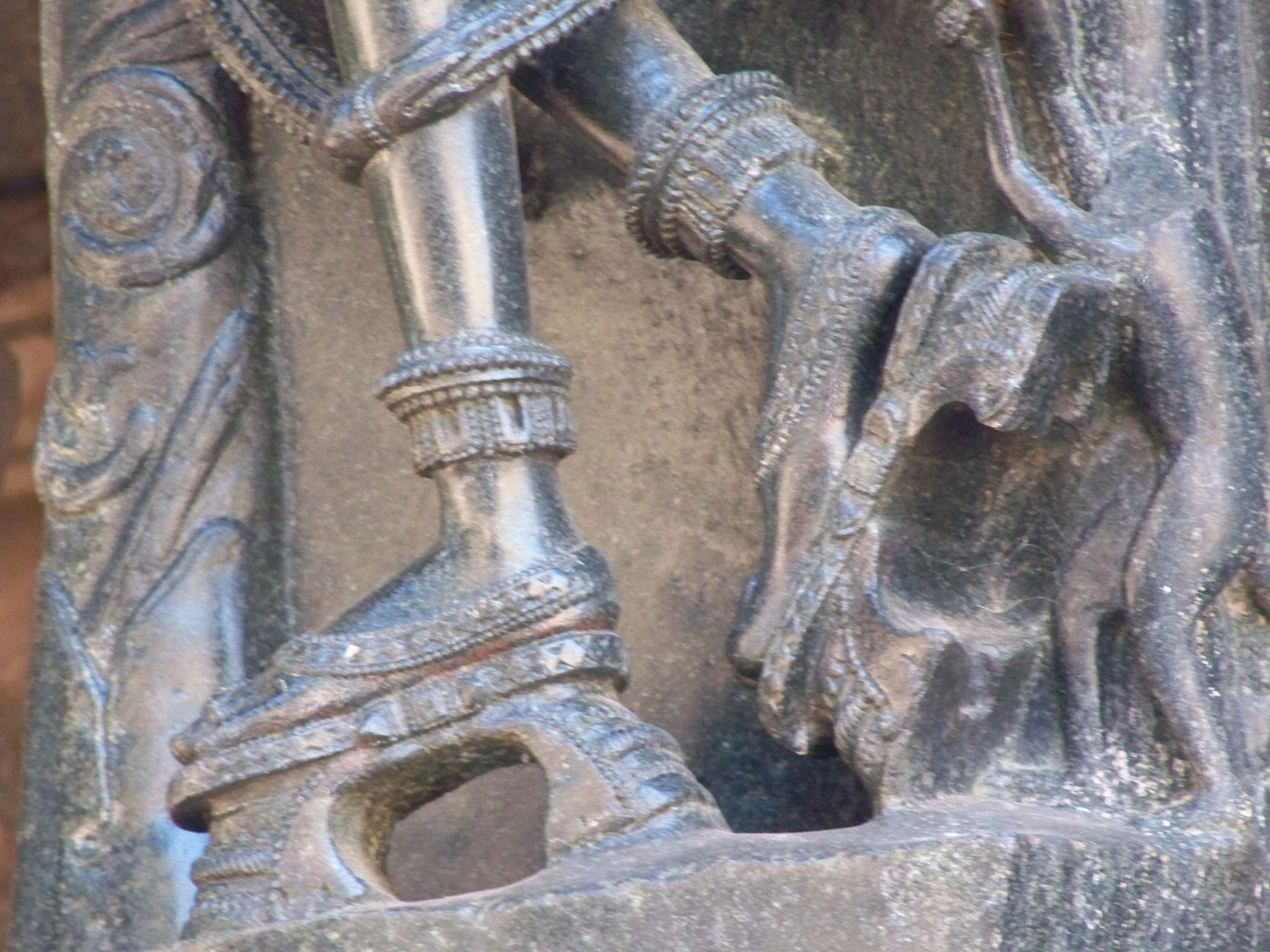
Closeup of padukas on an Indian medieval statue

After the Great Schism in the 11th century, the Pope notably began wearing red heeled shoes.Paduka is a high-heeled wooden footwear worn in South Asia and Southeast Asia since the ancient period. During the Medieval period in Europe, both men and women wore wooden pattens under or around their shoes to raise themselves out of the dirty and excrement-filled streets. The chopine combined this with the shoe, reaching heights up to 15 inches (38 cm) by 1430. Venetian law later limited the height to three inches—but this regulation was widely ignored. At the end of the Elizabethan era, cavalier boots were introduced for riding. These originally had relatively low heels, but by the time of the English Civil War stacked heels for men of up to two inches were common. A 17th-century law in Massachusetts announced that women would be subjected to the same treatment as witches if they lured men into marriage via the use of high-heeled shoes.

Under the Manchu Qing dynasty, most wealthy Han women had bound feet with lotus shoes but some women wore platform shoes elevated—like many chopine—at the center of the sole rather than at the heels.

=== 18th century ===
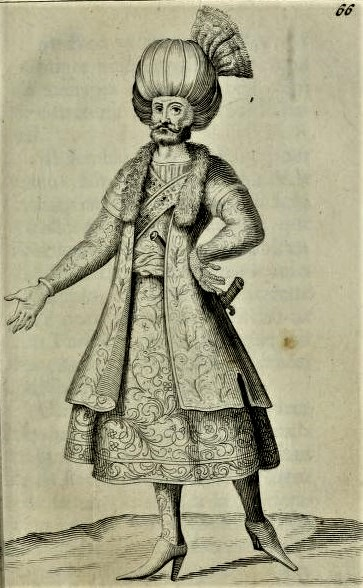
Persian men's heeled shoes in Safavid era

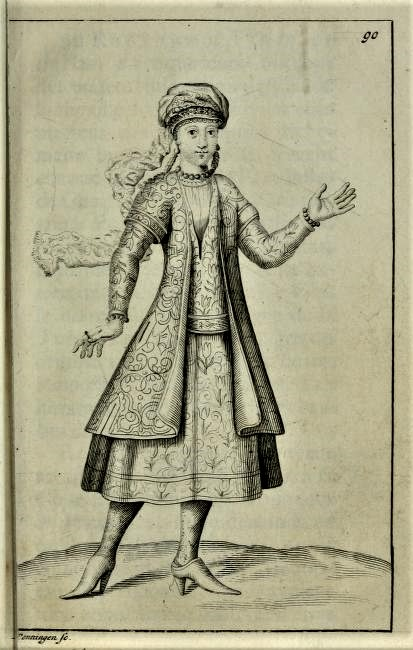
Persian women's heeled shoes in Safavid era

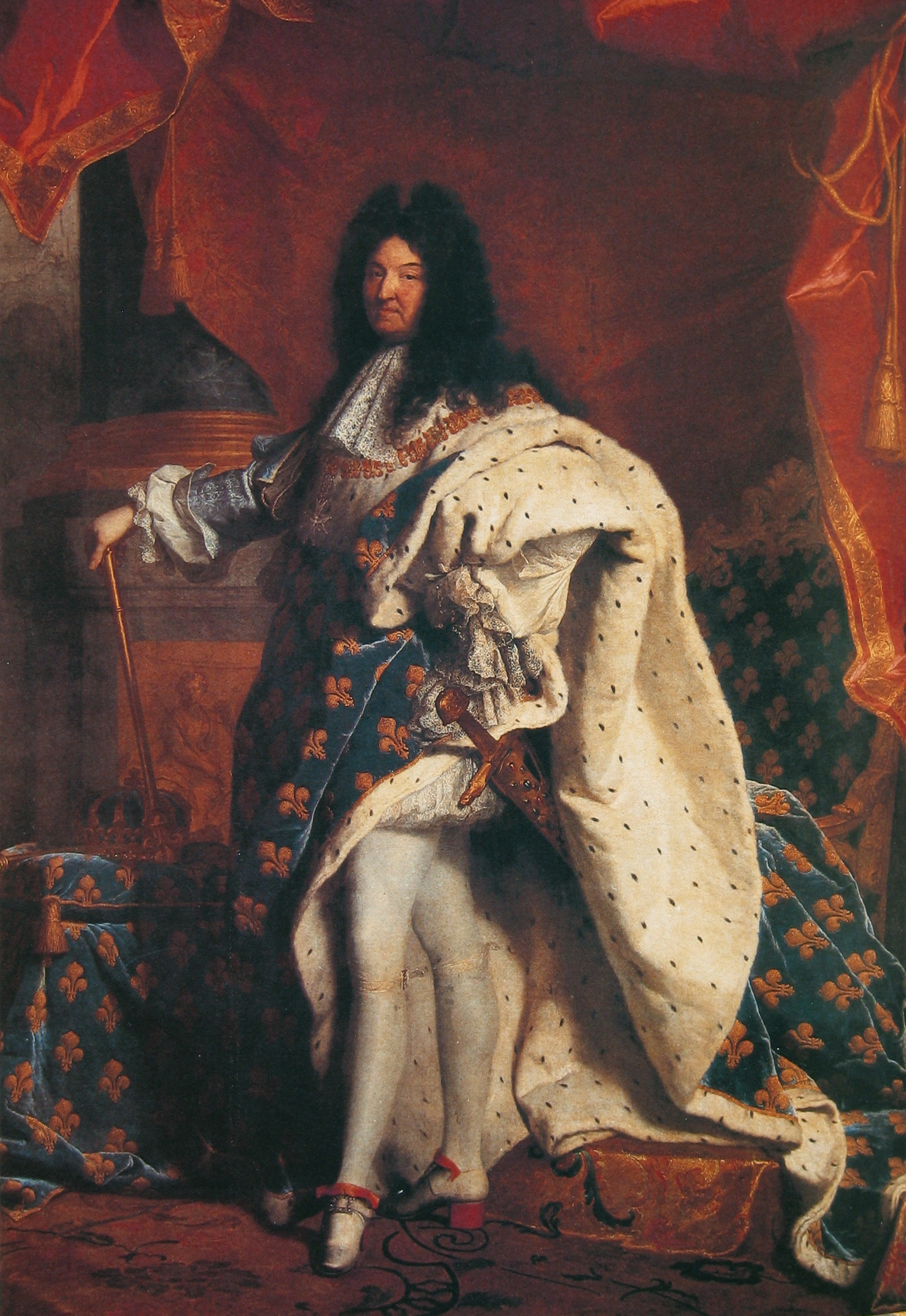
Portrait of King Louis XIV in high heels

Modern high heels were brought to Europe by Persian emissaries of Abbas the Great in the early 17th century. Men wore them to imply their upper-class status; only someone who did not have to work could afford, both financially and practically, to wear such extravagant shoes. Royalty such as King Louis XIV wore heels, and his predecessor King Louis XIII introduced the red heel to the court of French nobility. As the shoes became a fashion trend, other members of society began donning high heels, and some elite members ordered their heels to be made even higher to distinguish themselves from the lower classes. As women began to wear heeled shoes in the mid-to-late 17th century, societal trends moved to distinguish men's heels from women's heels. By the 18th century, men wore thick heels, while women wore thin ones. Over the course of the Enlightenment, men's heels began to concentrate on either practical riding boots or tall leather boots worn for status. In the late 1780s, the societal implications of wearing high and thin heels became fixed: high, thin heels represented femininity and the supposed superficiality and extravagance of women.

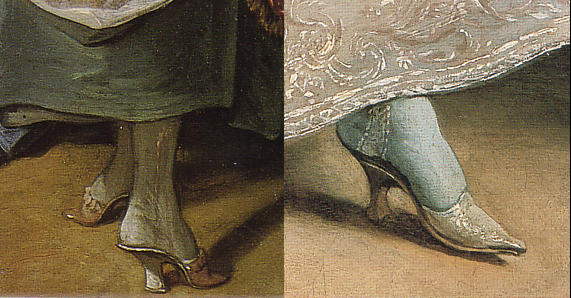
Typical 18th-century shoe

The design of the high French heels from the late 1600s to around the 1720s placed the wearer's body weight on the ball of the foot and was decorated with lace or braided fabric. From the 1730s to the 1740s, wide heels with an upturned toe and a buckle fastening became popular. The 1750s and 1760s introduced a skinnier, higher heel. The 1790s continued this trend but saw more experimentation with color. Additionally, during this period, there was no difference between the right and left shoes.

In Britain in 1770, an act was introduced into parliament that would have applied the same penalties to the use of high heels and other cosmetic devices as would have been applied in the case of witchcraft.

During the Regency era Hessian boots similar in appearance to modern cowboy boots were popular among dandies. After the Battle of Waterloo, high-heeled boots declined in popularity and were replaced with the lower-heeled Wellington Boots popularized by the famous British general.

=== 19th century ===
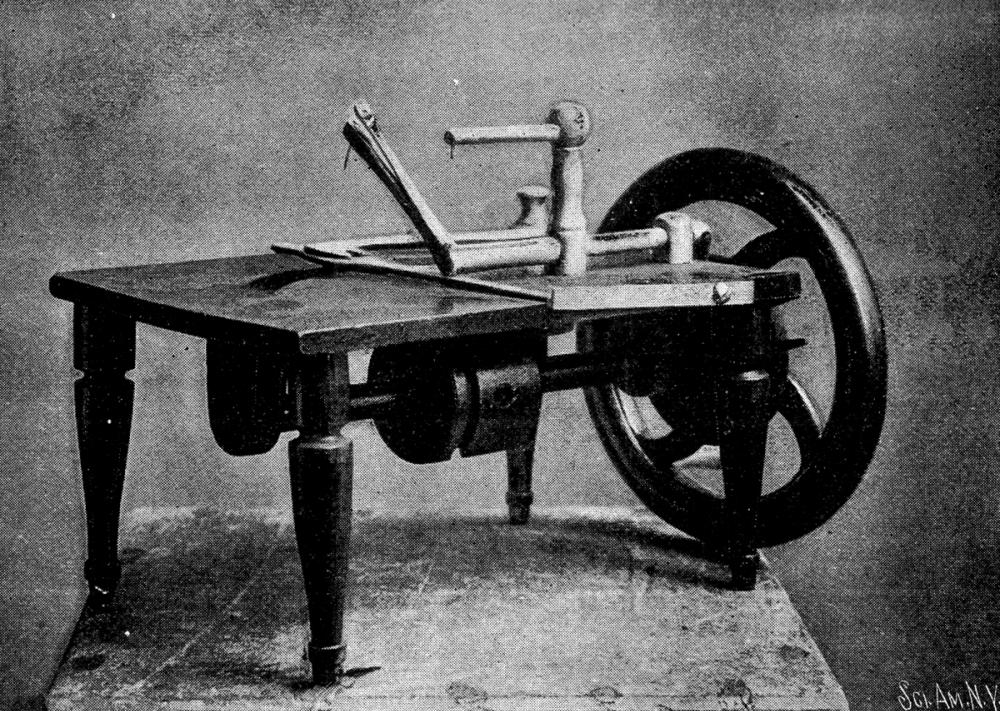
1850s sewing machine

Heels went out of fashion starting around 1810, and then in 1860, they surged in popularity, with an average height of about two and a half inches. The Pinetto heel and the Cromwell heel were both introduced during this time. Their production was also increased with the invention and eventual mass production of the sewing machine around the 1850s. With sewing machines, yields increased as machines could quickly and cheaply "position the heel, stitch the upper, and attach the upper to the sole."

=== 20th century ===
During the 20th century, World War I and World War II led many countries to ration materials that were previously used to make shoes. Materials such as silk, rubber, and leather were prioritized for military use. Heels began to be replaced with cork and wooden-soled shoes. Due to the post-war increase in international communication, especially through photography and films, the Western fashion of women's high heels began to spread globally. In the early post-war period, brown and white pumps with cutouts or ankle straps combined with an open toe were some of the most fashionable women's heels. For many women in the West, high-heeled shoes began to symbolize professionalism, whereas leather and rubber thick-heeled boots for men came to be associated with militarism and masculinity.

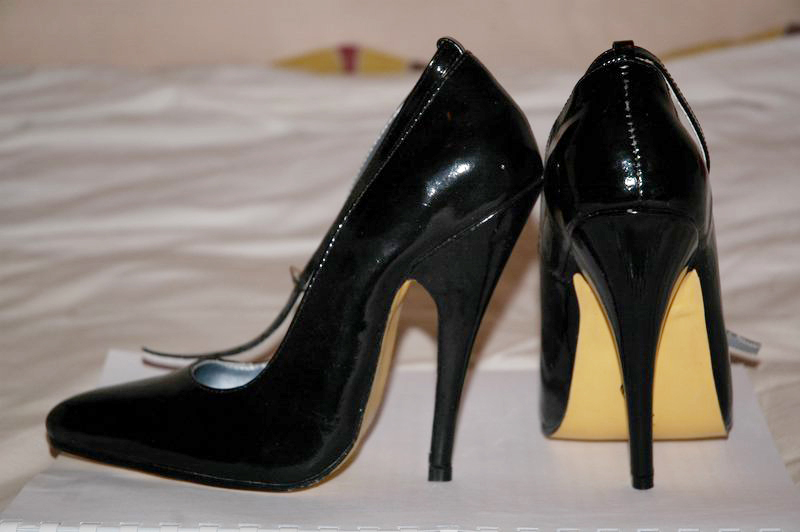
A pair of stiletto-heeled court shoes

The era surrounding World War II saw the popularization of pin-up girl posters, the women in which were almost always pictured wearing high heels. In the minds of many men at war, and later, in American society at large, this led to an increase in the strength of the relationship between high heels and female sexuality. The tall, skinny stiletto heel was invented in 1950, and quickly became an emblem of female sexuality. There was a weakening of the stiletto style during the late 1960s, early 1970s, and 1990s when block heels were more prominent, followed by a revival in the 2000s.

For men, high heeled boots made a comeback in the 1950 as the cowboy boot, associated with Western movies. During the 1960 and 1970, Beatle boots, Chelsea boots and Winkle-pickers with Cuban heels became popular among Teddy boys, the mod subculture and the early garage punk scene.

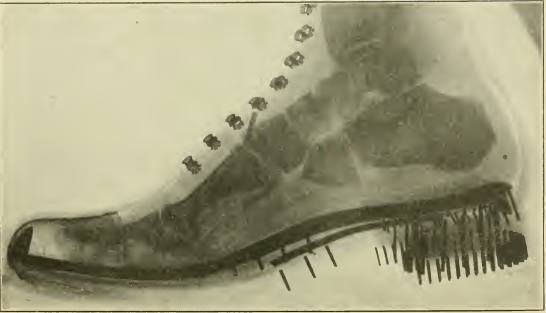
1920 US Marine Corps shoe, with high heel, showing position of foot bones (vertical black marks on the x-ray are nails used to hold the sole and heel on)

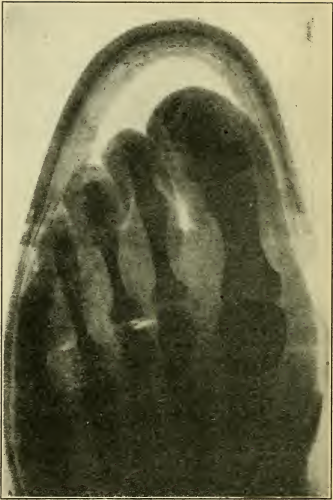
Same shoe from above, showing pointed toe box too narrow for the toes, and hallux valgus deformity. The high heel shifts weight forwards, putting additional pressure on the sides of the toes

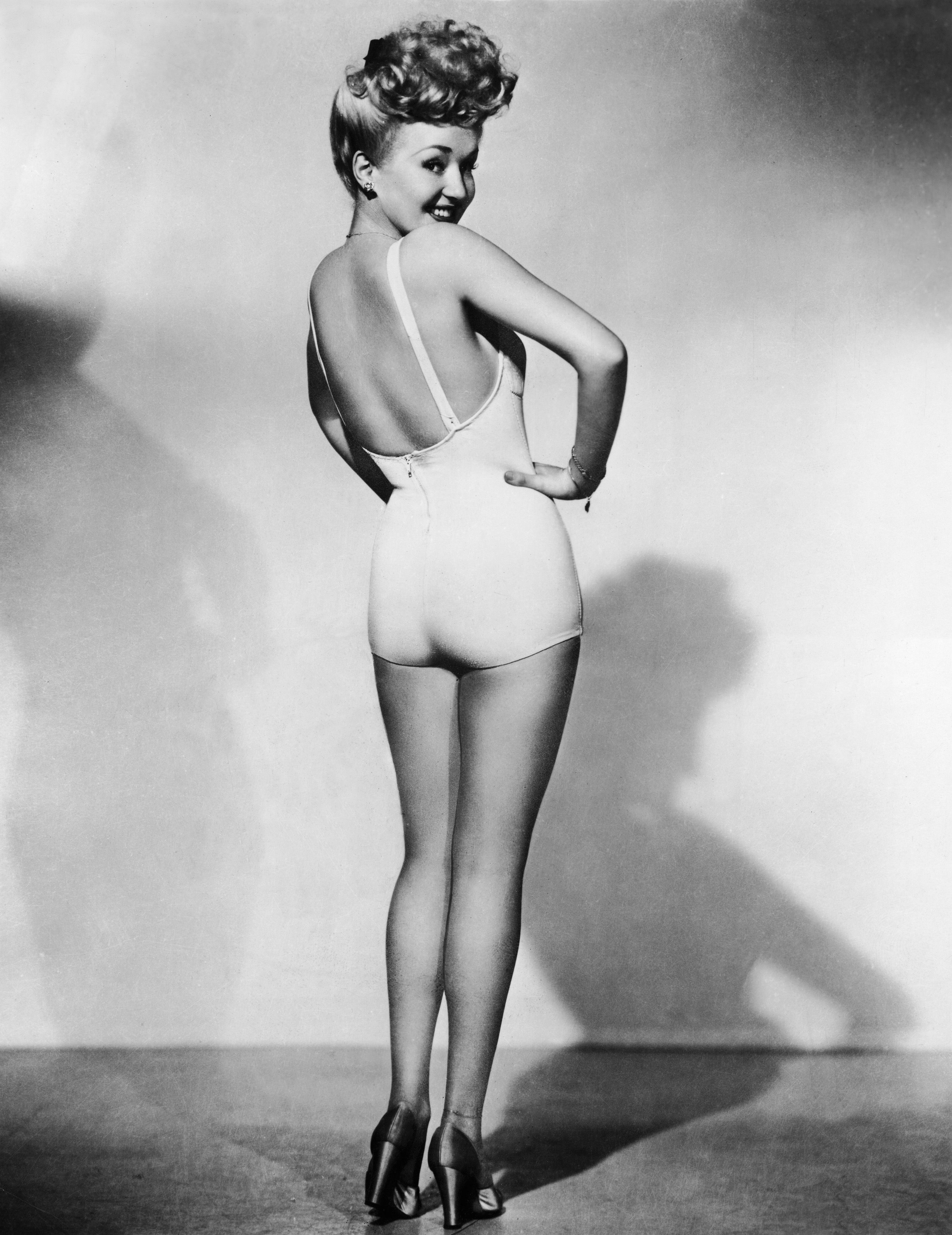
World War II poster of pin-up girl (Betty Grable) in high heels

=== 21st century ===
In the Western world, high-heeled shoes exist in two highly gendered and parallel tracks: highly fashionable and variable women's shoes with thin long heels, and practical, relatively uniform men's shoes in a riding boot style, with thick, relatively short heels. Heels are often described as a sex symbol for women, and magazines like Playboy, as well as other media sources that primarily portray women in a sexual way often do so using high heels. Despite the sexual connotations, heels are considered both fashionable and professional dress for women in most cases, the latter especially if accompanied by a pants suit. Some researchers argue that high heels have become part of the female workplace uniform and operate in a much larger and complex set of display rules.

== Visual effects on posture and appearance ==
High-heeled footwear alter posture and gait in ways that produce a range of visual effects associated with perceived attractiveness. By placing the foot in a plantarflexed position, heels tilt the pelvis forward and increase lumbar curvature, shifting the wearer's centre of mass and modifying overall stance and movement. This biomechanical adjustment has been associated with a more pronounced arch of the lower back, which research suggests may influence perceptions of attractiveness, as well as a more upright posture and stylised gait. In addition, heels visually elongate the legs and accentuate calf muscles by altering muscle tension and leg extension. Paul Morris, a psychology researcher at the University of Portsmouth, argues that high heels accentuate "sex-specific aspects of female gait," artificially increasing a woman's femininity. Likewise, many see the arching of a woman's back facilitated by wearing high heels as an imitation of a signal of a woman's willingness to be courted by a man. These combined effects can also increase the apparent prominence of the buttocks and chest due to changes in spinal alignment and hip angle, contributing to an overall silhouette that has been culturally associated with femininity and sexual dimorphism. Such effects are widely discussed in both academic and cultural analyses of fashion, though they reflect perceptual and socially mediated responses rather than inherent changes to the body itself.

== Types ==
- Angle – "the surface of the base of the heel is straight until reaching the waistline, and it looks like the shape of the Korean letter ¬"
- Annabelle – 7-cm platform heel
- Bar – had jewelry or other decorative aspects; associated with flapper culture.
- Chunky – have a thick heel, frequently paired with platforms
- Continental – 7.5 mm, with the upper part of the chest of the heel spreading towards the center of the shoe.
- Cromwell – based on Oliver Cromwell with heel up to 170 mm (6.5 in).
- Cuban – similar to the continental heel, but not curved, generally medium height. Unlike the setback heel, the Cuban heel slopes away from the back surface of the shoe.
- New Look in 1947 – a slim, elegant heel, newly created by putting steel in the heel. This enabled the heel to be skinny without snapping.
- Pantaloon – "similar to Pantaloon pants: the top lift part of the heel is spread out as it extends to the bottom part of the heel, and the waistline of the heel curves inward naturally."
- Pinet – straight and skinny
- Platform – having a thicker sole under the ball of the foot, elevating the total height
- Setback – similar to the continental heel, but the surface of the back of the heel is straight, forming a right angle.
- Stacked – usually layers of leather 5 mm thick stacked together and trimmed to match the shape of the heel. These are commonly known as block heels.
- Stiletto – tall, skinny heel—the name taken from a long thin knife— first mentioned in a newspaper in September 1953.
- Wedge – popularized by Salvatore Ferragamo, who introduced this in the Italian market in the late 1930s.

=== Materials ===
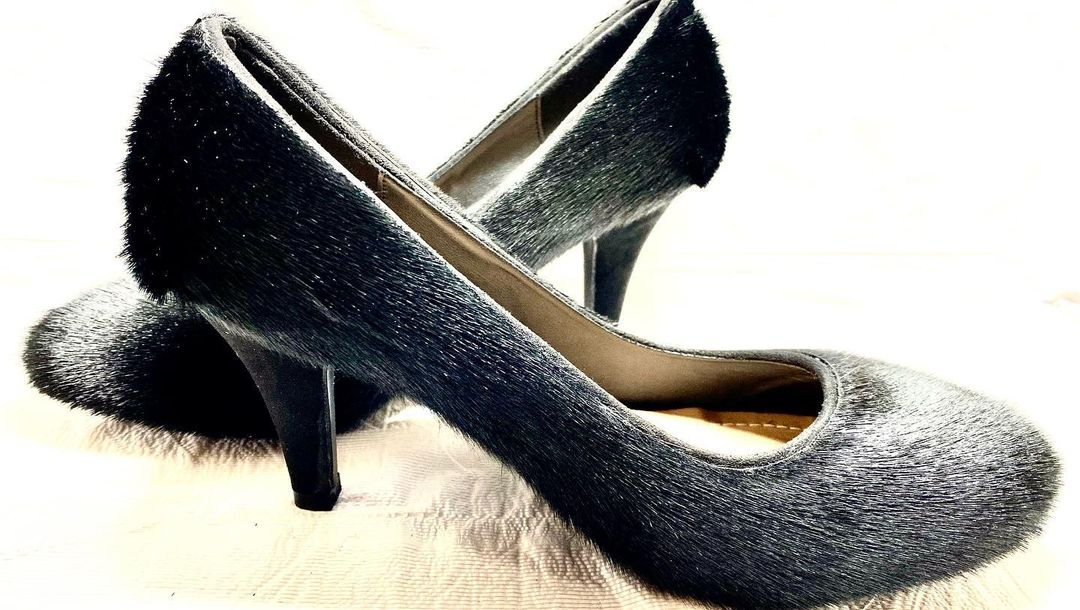
Women's high-heeled shoes with dyed black harp seal fur, by Inuk designer Nicole Camphaug

High heels have been made from a wide variety of materials throughout history. In the early years, leather and cowhide were preferred. Later, silk and patent leather were introduced. At the same time, cork and wood were utilized as cheap resources in times of war. After the World Wars, and the increase in production of steel, the actual heel was often a piece of steel wrapped in some material. This enabled designers to make heels taller and skinnier without them snapping. The soles below the ball of the foot of ballroom shoes can also be made of materials like smooth leather, suede, or plastic.

== Health impacts ==
=== Injury and pain ===
Wearing high-heeled shoes is strongly associated with injury, including injury requiring hospital care. Despite the dangers, they are still admired and even worn by many, of both genders. There is evidence that high-heel-wearers fall more often, especially with heels higher than 2.5 cm, even if they were not wearing high heels at the time of the fall. Wearing high heels is also associated with musculoskeletal pain, specifically pain in the paraspinal muscles (muscles running up the back along the spine) and specifically with heel pain and plantar calluses (only women tested).

A 2001 survey conducted by Pennsylvania State University of 200 women found that 58% of women complained of lower back pain when wearing heels, and 55% of women said they felt the worst overall back pain when wearing the highest heel. The same study argues that as heel height increases, the body is forced to take on an increasingly unnatural posture to maintain its center of gravity. This changed position places more pressure and tension on the lower lumbar spine, which may explain why some of the women complained of severe back pain at a higher heel length.

In a 1992 study, researchers from the University of California, Davis, and Thomas Jefferson University investigated the effects of increased heel height on foot pressure using forty-five female participants walking across a pressure plate in various heel heights. A biokinetics software was used to analyze the exact pressure locations on and along each participants' foot. The researchers concluded that an increase in heel height leads to an increase in pressure beneath each of the metatarsal bones of the foot. Additionally, they found that the highest heel heights caused constant pressure that could not be evenly dispersed across the foot.

In a 2012 study, Kai-Yu Ho, Mark Blanchette, and Christopher Powers investigated the impact of heel height on knee stress during walking. The study consisted of eleven participants wearing tracking and reflective markers as they walked across a 10-meter force-plated walkway in low, medium, and high heels. The study argued that as the height of the heel increased, the ball of the foot experienced an increase in pressure resulting in increased discomfort levels and peak patellofemoral joint stress. The researchers also mentioned that the long-term usage of high heels may lead to repetitive overstress of the joint, which may result in an increase in pain and, eventually, patellofemoral joint osteoarthritis and patellofemoral pain syndrome.

In a 2012 study, researchers examined the risk long-time high heel wearers would have in regards to calf muscle fascicle length and strain. The control group consisted of women who wore heels for less than ten hours weekly and the experimental group consisted of women who wore heels for a minimum of forty hours weekly for at least two years. The experimental group was told to walk down a walkway barefoot and in heels. In contrast, the control group walked barefoot as cameras recorded their movements to calculate muscle fascicle lengths. The data showed that wearing heels shortened the size of the medial gastrocnemius (MG) muscle bundles in the calf significantly as well as increasing stiffness in the Achilles tendon. The experimental group also demonstrated a more significant strain on the muscle fascicles while walking in heels because of the flexed position the foot is forced into. The researchers estimated that when wearing heels, the estimated fascicle strains were approximately three times higher, and the fascicle strain rate was about six times higher. Additionally, they concluded that the long-term usage of high heels could increase the risk of injuries such as strain, discomfort, and muscle fatigue.

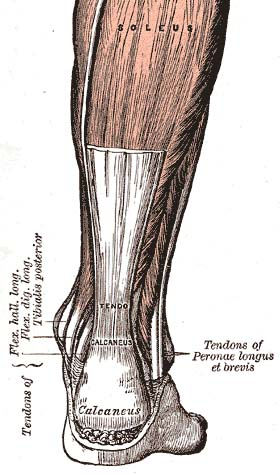
Diagram of an Achilles tendon

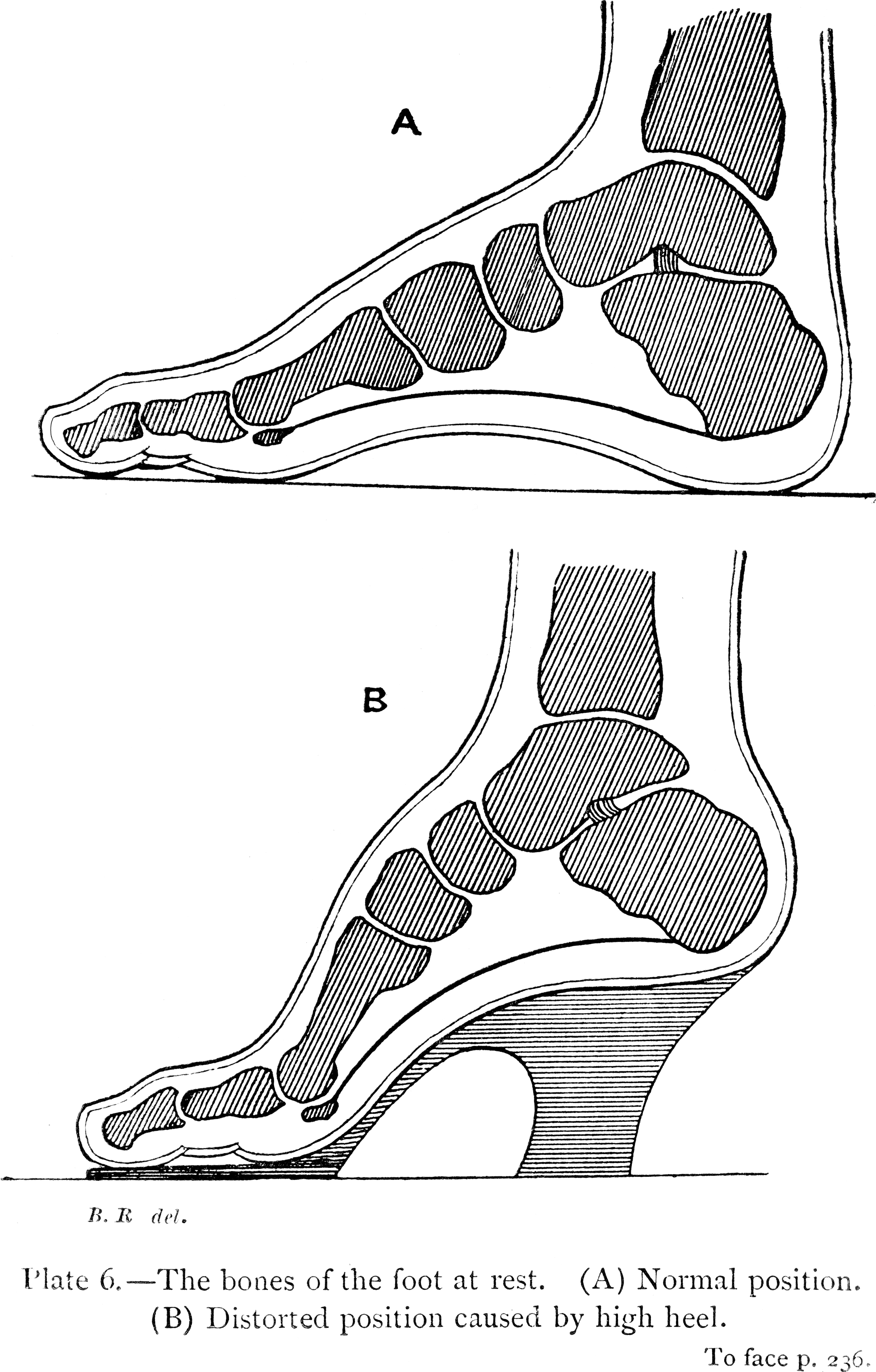
Plantar flexion of the foot in high heels

=== Bunions ===
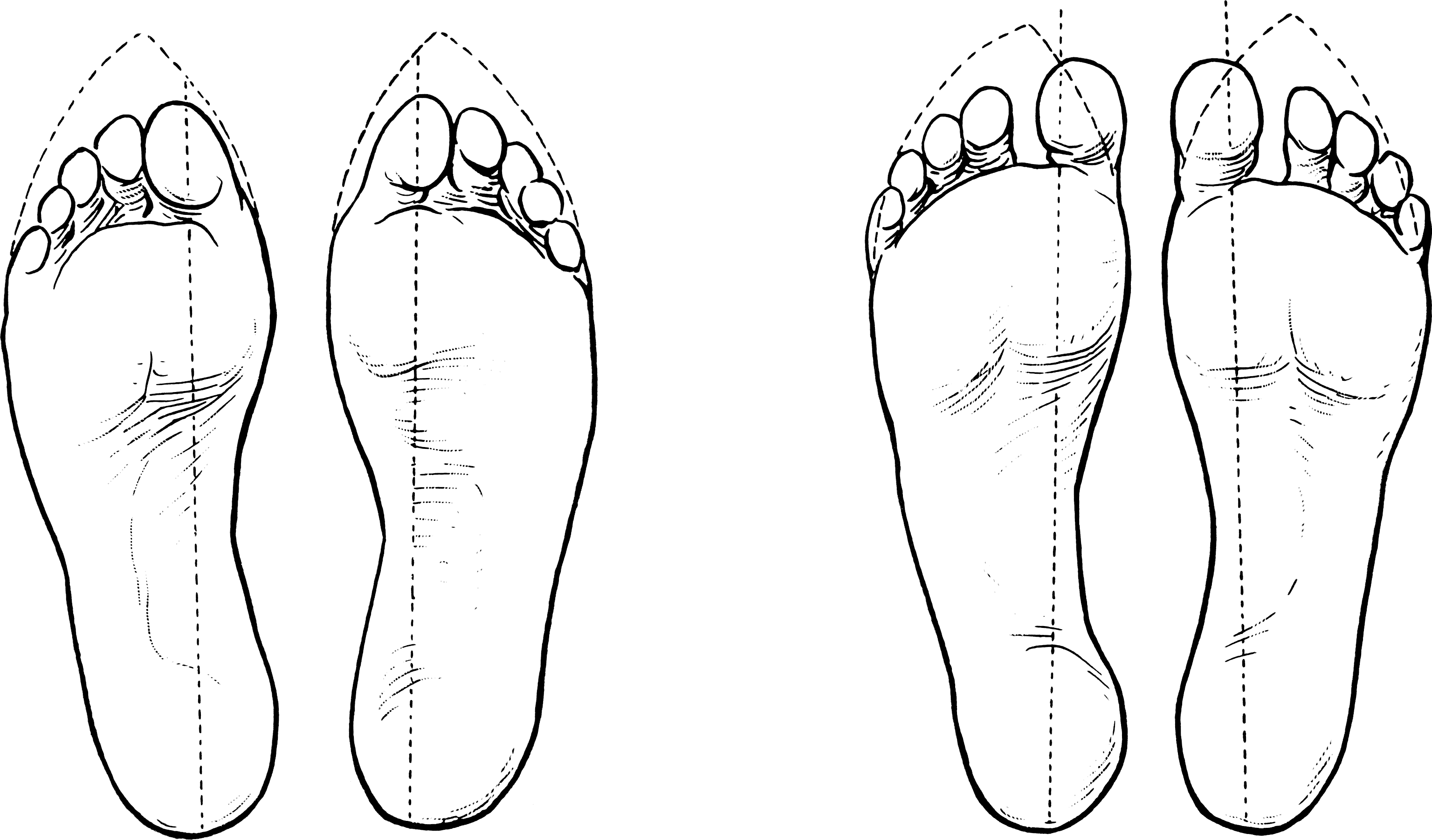
High-heeled shoes almost always have pointed toe boxes which do not fit around the toes, but displace them from their natural position.

Wearing high-heeled shoes is associated with developing bunions, a deformity of the foot.

=== Balance control of the body ===
In 2016, scientists from the Department of Physical Therapy at Sahmyook University in Korea conducted a study to examine increased heel height and gait velocity on balance control. In this study, the participants were told to wear either a low or high heel and walk on a treadmill at a low and high speed. As a result of this experiment, the researchers argued that as heel height increased, the sway velocity of the bodies increased, which also modified the position of the knee joint, requiring the muscles of the leg to realign the entire body, especially the hips, along the line of gravity. As the body's weight shifted forward, the hips were taken out of alignment, and the knee joints experienced stress to adjust to the shift.

=== Postural effects ===
Spinal column curvature

In a 2016 study from Sahmyook University in Korea, researchers investigated the effects of high heels on the activation of muscles in the cervical and lumbar portions of the spine. Thirteen women were recruited to walk down a walkway in three different testing conditions: barefoot, in 4 cm heels and in 10 cm heels. Surface electrodes were placed on the muscle mass of the women's spines and their feet to measure the electrical activity of muscles at different points of movement. The study results indicated an increase in both cervical and lumbar muscle activation as heel height increased: the cervical spine, the neck assists in maintaining head stability and postural control in the body. The usage of high heels shifts the body's center of mass, which requires the spine to adjust itself to maintain balance. The researchers mentioned that these results would increase local muscle fatigue over time, which could lead to muscle swelling, decreased muscle movement, and, in extreme cases of overuse, tissue deformation.

=== Vein swelling ===
Some research indicates that a possible consequence of wearing high heels is increasing pressure in one's veins. Experiments suggest that the higher the heel, the "higher [the] venous pressure in the leg." This means that after repeated use of high heels, varicose veins and other undesirable symptoms are much more likely to appear in the legs. Other research supports the claim that wearing high heels can lead to numerous long-term effects, including accidental trauma to multiple areas of the body.

== Legislation ==
In Carmel-by-the-Sea, California, heels over 2 inches high with less than one square inch of bearing surface can be worn only with a permit.

It has been argued by some union leaders that high heels in the workplace should be subject to a health and safety assessment.

In the UK in 2016 temporary receptionist Nicola Thorp was sent home without pay after she refused to follow the dress code of the firm Portico. Thorp launched an online petition calling for the UK government to "make it illegal for a company to require women to wear high heels at work". Two parliamentary committees in January 2017 decided that Portico had broken the law, but by this time the company had already changed its terms of employment. The petition was rejected by the government in April 2017 as they stated that existing legislation was "adequate". Existing legislation in the UK allows women to be required to wear high heels, but only if it is considered a job requirement and men in the same job are required to dress to an "equivalent level of smartness".

In April 2017 the Canadian province of British Columbia amended workplace legislation to prevent employers from requiring women to wear high heels at work. Other Canadian provinces followed suit.

The Philippines forbade companies from mandating that female employees wear high heels at work in September 2017.

The #KuToo campaign in Japan collected nearly 20,000 signatures on a petition for a ban on mandatory high heels. The Ministry of Health, Labour and Welfare (MHLW) responded that it had no plans to introduce new legislation to prevent companies from regulating the clothing and footwear of their employees. The Minister of MHLW has stated that it is acceptable for companies and others to require women to wear high heels as long as it is necessary and appropriate for the job, with reference to socially accepted norms. He also said that forcing injured workers to wear high heels, for example, was power harassment.

== Feminism ==
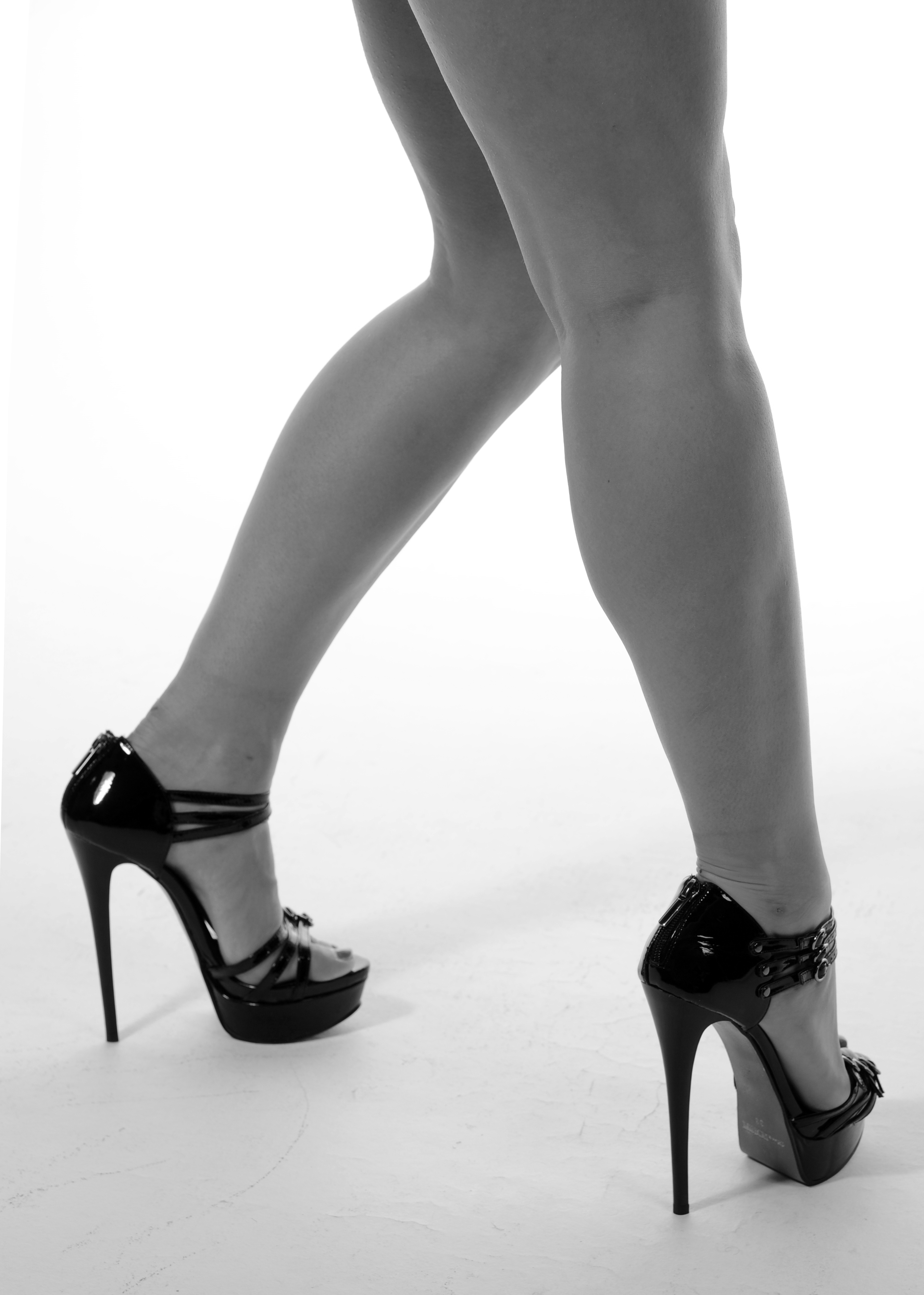
High heels can have the effect of sexualizing the wearer.

In the West, high-heeled shoes are often regarded as an emblem of femininity, and thus have been the subject of analysis by feminist authors. Some have argued that "high-heeled shoes, perhaps more than any other item of clothing, are seen as the ultimate symbol of being a woman."

Some feminist scholars have argued that men's views on the culture of high heels are problematic: A sizable proportion of men regard the cultural expectation for women in professional environments to wear high heels as unproblematic. However, it has not been popular for men to wear tall and thin high heels since the late 17th century. Thus, since some women report that high heels are often painful to walk in, and commonly result in negative side effects to joints and veins after prolonged use, many have argued that it is unreasonable of men to support such a cultural norm.

At the feminist Miss America protest in 1968, protestors symbolically threw a number of feminine products into a "freedom trash can." These included high heels, which were among items the protestors called "instruments of female torture" and accouterments of what they perceived to be enforced femininity.

In 2015, a group of women were turned away from a film premiere at the Cannes Film Festival in France for wearing flat shoes, including a woman physically unable to wear heels due to an operation on one of her feet. The women complained that the policy of the festival on women's footwear was unjust. Festival organizers later responded that there was no official policy on footwear and stated that they would remind red carpet officials of this.

=== Dress codes ===
Few dress codes require women to wear high heels, and some medical organizations have called for a ban on such dress codes. There have been many protests by women workers against such policies. Laws regarding dress codes that require women to wear high heels in the workplace vary.

=== A Mile in Her Shoes ===
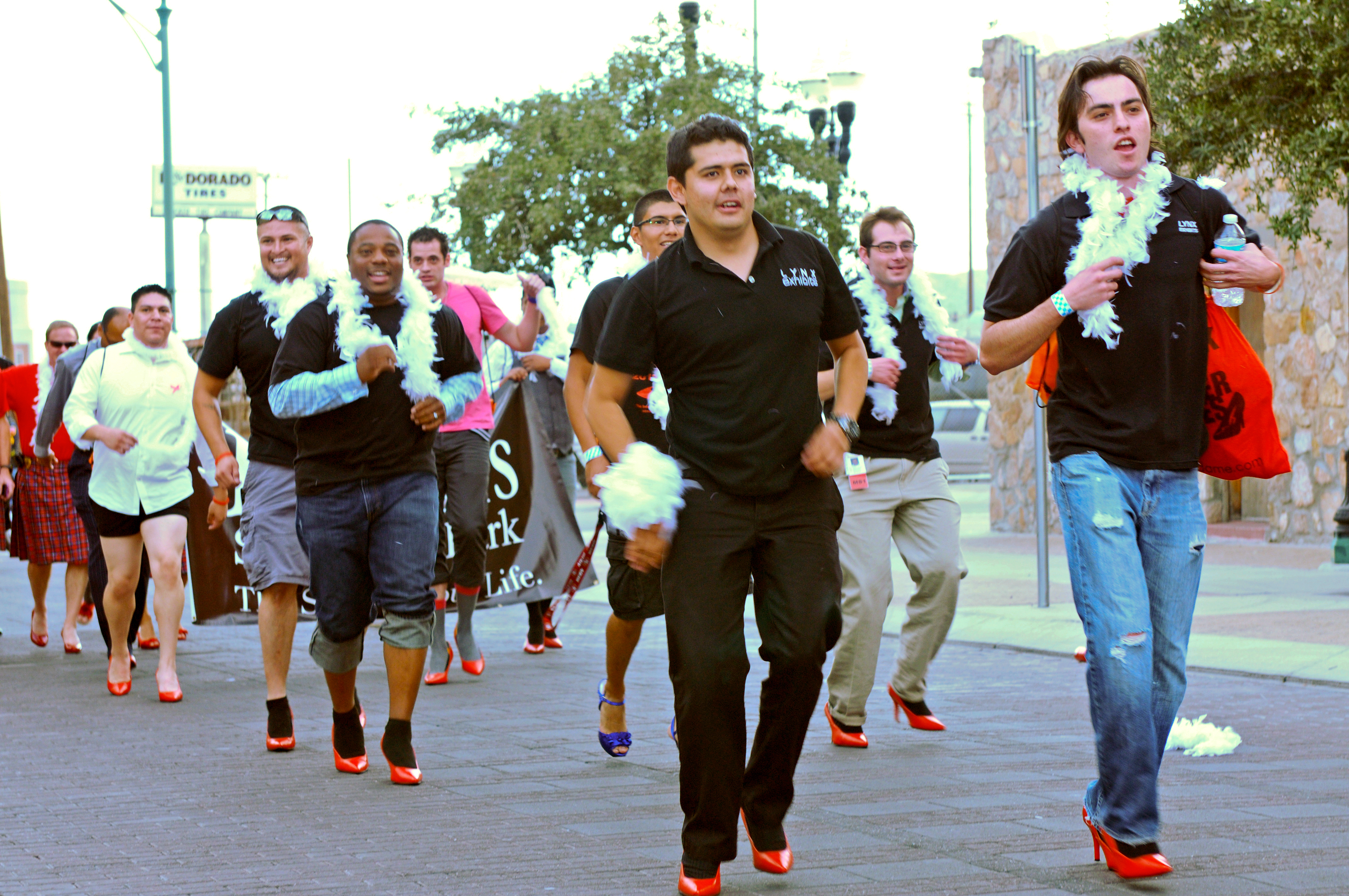
A Mile in Her Shoes: men walk a mile in high heels to support domestic violence victims

A Mile in Her Shoes is a series of marches in which men wear red high heels and walk a mile to protest domestic violence. Some academics have suggested that by wearing high heels for such a brief period and making a point of acting like they do not know how to walk properly, these men reinforce the stereotype that only women can or should wear high heels.

== Children ==
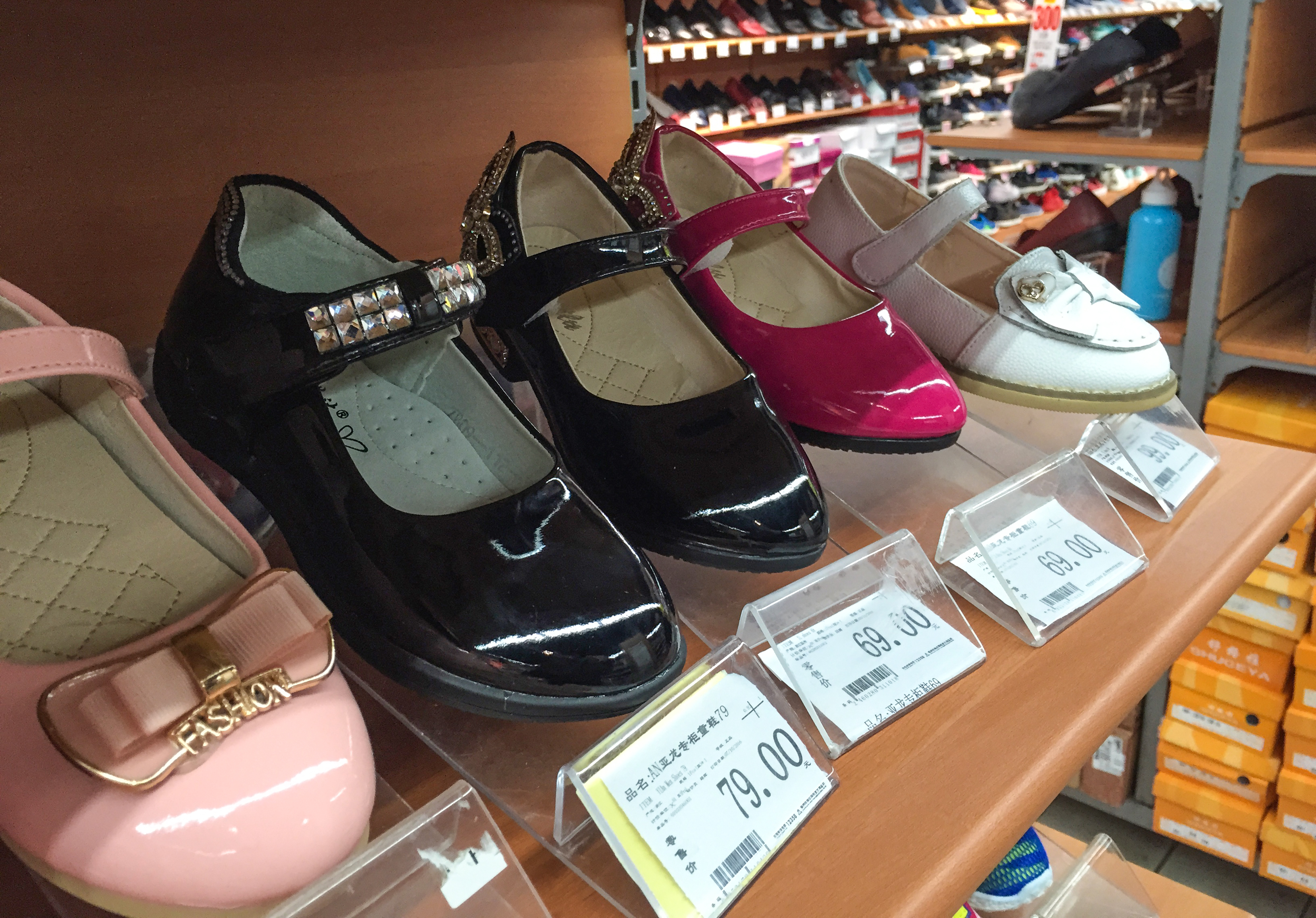
Children's high-heeled Mary Janes for sale in Fuzhou

High heels are also sometimes marketed to children, and some schools encourage children to wear them. 18% of injuries from wearing high heels were in children, and 4% in under-tens, in a 2002–2012 US survey. A 2016 medical review on high-heeled shoes expressed concern about children's use of high heels. A nine-year-old is about 80 percent of an adult's height, and a toddler about one half; so, relative to body height, a 2-inch (5 cm) heel on an adult would be a 1.6-inch heel on the nine-year-old, and a 1-inch heel on the toddler, though whether this translates to comparable health harms is not known.

== Dancing ==
=== Styles of dance that use heels ===
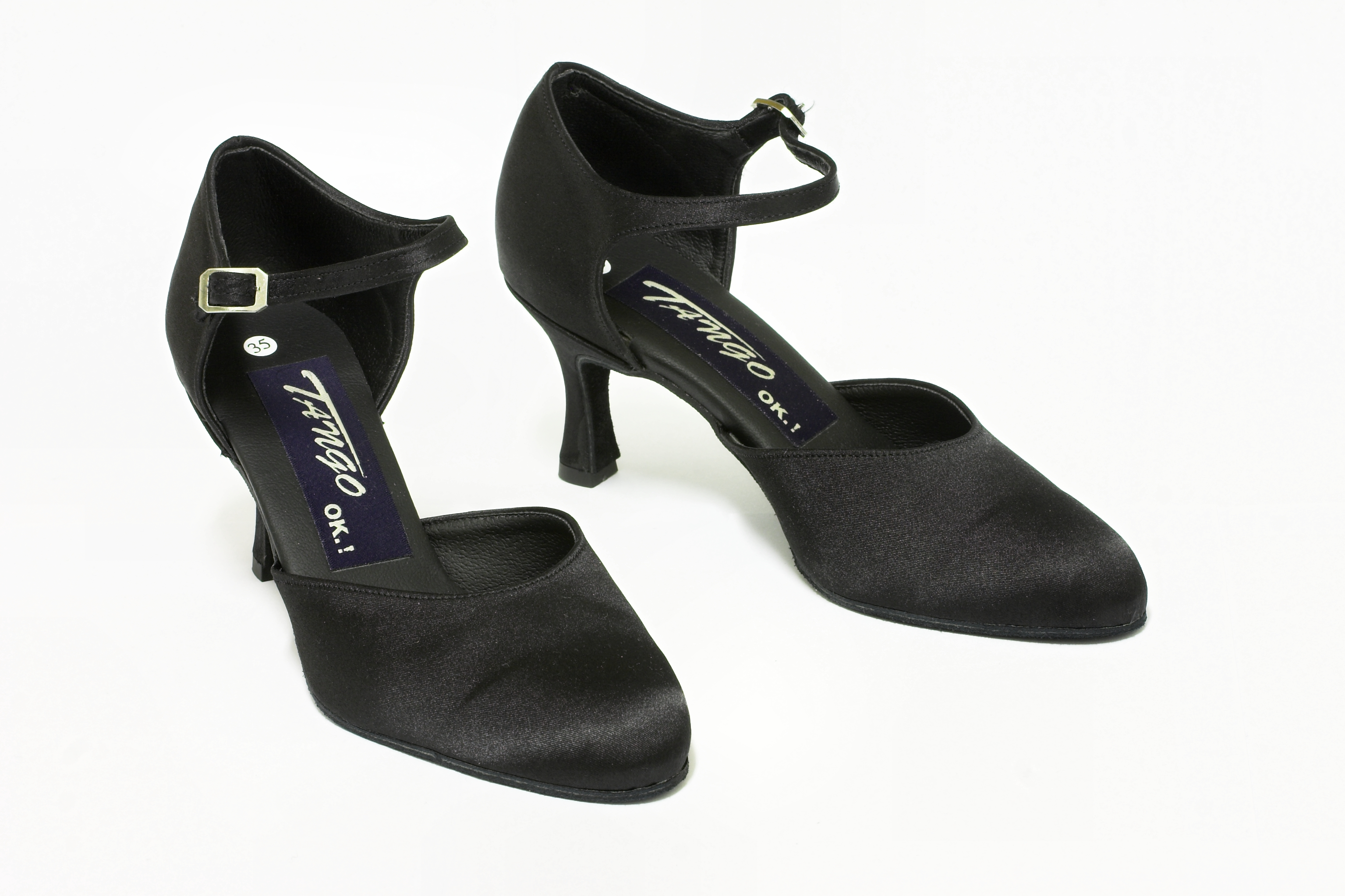
Standard ballroom tango shoes

Many styles of dance are performed in heels. Ballroom dancing shoes are specific to the dance style being performed. International Standard ballroom shoes for women are closed-toed shoes with a sturdy 2-to-2.5-inch heel because steps are performed using the foot's heel. International Latin and American Rhythm shoes are open-toed, strapped heels that are an average of 2.5 to 3 inches in height. These shoes have the least sturdy heel because International Latin and American Rhythm styles are performed on the ball of the foot. This style of shoe is designed with a flexible sole to allow pointed feet. Lastly, American Smooth shoes are closed-toed, flexible-soled shoes that range in heel height from 2 to 2.5 inches.

A non-traditional ballroom dance that uses heels is the Argentine tango. While dancing the Argentine tango, women often wear pointed heels ranging in height from 2 to 4 inches. More advanced dancers typically choose higher heels. The heels can have a significant impact on the posture of a dancer by tilting the pelvis and making the buttocks more prominent, forcing the abdomen in and pushing the breasts out. They can also cause instability as they force women to dance on their toes and lean on their partner, which adds to the fluidity of the movements.

A modern style of dance called heels choreography or stiletto dance specializes in choreography that blends the styles of jazz, hip-hop, and burlesque with the fusion of vogue movements and is performed using stilettos or high heels. Dancers such as Yanis Marshall specialize in dancing with high heels.

=== Injuries ===
Some dance-related injuries are attributable to the use of heels. In particular, shoes with a narrow space for the toes can squeeze tightly enough to cause foot deformity. Dancers can add cushioning to the soles of their dancing shoes or inserts to ease the pain during dancing.

== See also ==
- List of shoe styles
- Ballet boot
- Cowboy boot
- Desert boots
- Elevator shoes
- Fashion boots
- Foot binding
- Fuck-me shoes
- High heel policy
- Insolia
- Locomotor effects of shoes
- Platform boots
- Pointed shoe
- Removable heel
- Riding boots
- Stiletto heel
- Thigh-high boots
- Wedge heel
