= Hal Varian =

American economist (born 1947)

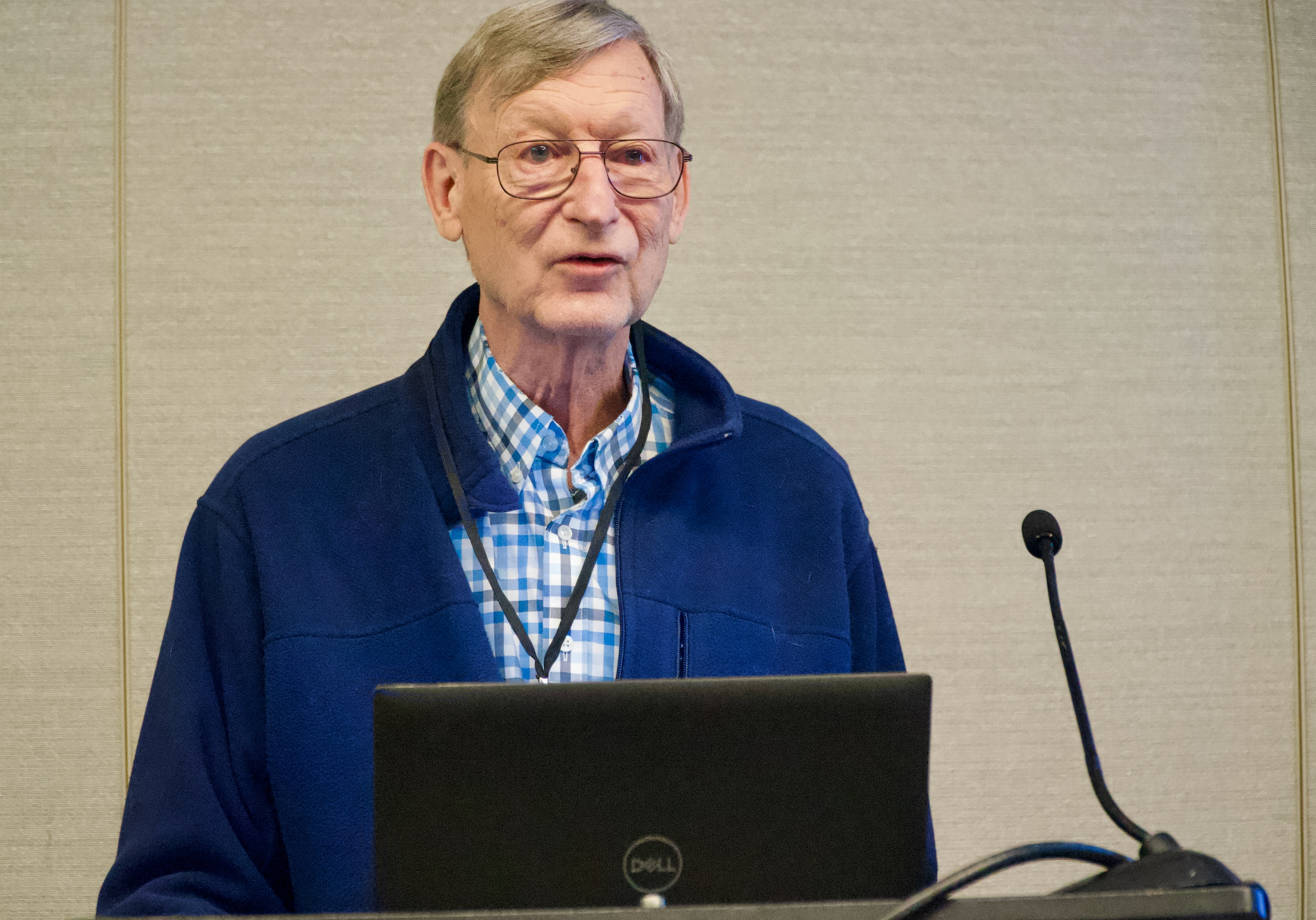
- Born: March 18, 1947 (age 79); Wooster, Ohio, U.S.

Academic background
- Education: MIT; University of California, Berkeley
- Doctoral advisor: Daniel McFadden; David Gale

Academic work
- Discipline: Microeconomics, information technology
- School or tradition: Neoclassical economics
- Institutions: University of California, Berkeley; MIT
- Doctoral students: Earl Grinols; James Andreoni; Cyrus Chu
- Website: Information at IDEAS / RePEc

Hal Ronald Varian (born March 18, 1947, Wooster, Ohio) is an American economist and served as a chief economist at Google. He also holds the title of emeritus professor at the University of California, Berkeley where he was founding dean of the School of Information. Varian is an economist specializing in microeconomics and information economics.

Varian joined Google in 2002 as its chief economist. He played a key role in the development of Google's advertising model and data analysis practices until his retirement in August 2025.

== Early life ==
Hal Varian was born on March 18, 1947, in Wooster, Ohio. He received his B.S. from MIT in economics in 1969 and both his M.A. in mathematics and Ph.D. in economics from the University of California, Berkeley in 1973.

== Career ==
Varian taught at MIT, Stanford University, the University of Oxford, the University of Michigan, the University of Siena and other universities around the world. He has two honorary doctorates, from the University of Oulu, Finland in 2002, and a Dr. h. c. from the Karlsruhe Institute of Technology (KIT), Germany, awarded in 2006. He is emeritus professor at the University of California, Berkeley, where he was founding dean of the School of Information.

Varian joined Google in 2002 as chief economist, and has worked on the design of advertising auctions, econometrics, finance, corporate strategy, and public policy until his retirement in 2025.

Varian is the author of two bestselling textbooks: Intermediate Microeconomics, an undergraduate microeconomics text, and Microeconomic Analysis, an advanced text aimed primarily at first-year graduate students in economics. Together with Carl Shapiro, he co-authored Information Rules: A Strategic Guide to the Network Economy and The Economics of Information Technology: An Introduction. According to the Open Syllabus Project, Varian is the fourth most frequently cited author on college syllabi for economics courses.

In September 2023, Varian was called to testify in the United States v. Google lawsuit by the Department of Justice on a memo he wrote in 2003: "Thoughts on Google v Microsoft." with the subject "We should be careful about what we say in both public and private". The DOJ also brought up memos where Varian instructed Google employees to avoid the use of language such as "market share," "scale," "network effects," "leverage," "lock up," "lock in," "bundle," and "tie.", to avoid Google from being perceived as being a monopoly and to avoid scrutiny from antitrust watchdogs.

== Personal life ==
Varian is married and has one child, Christopher Max Varian.

== See also ==
- Varian Rule
- Varian's theorems
