= Kitten heel =

Type of shoe with a thin, curved heel

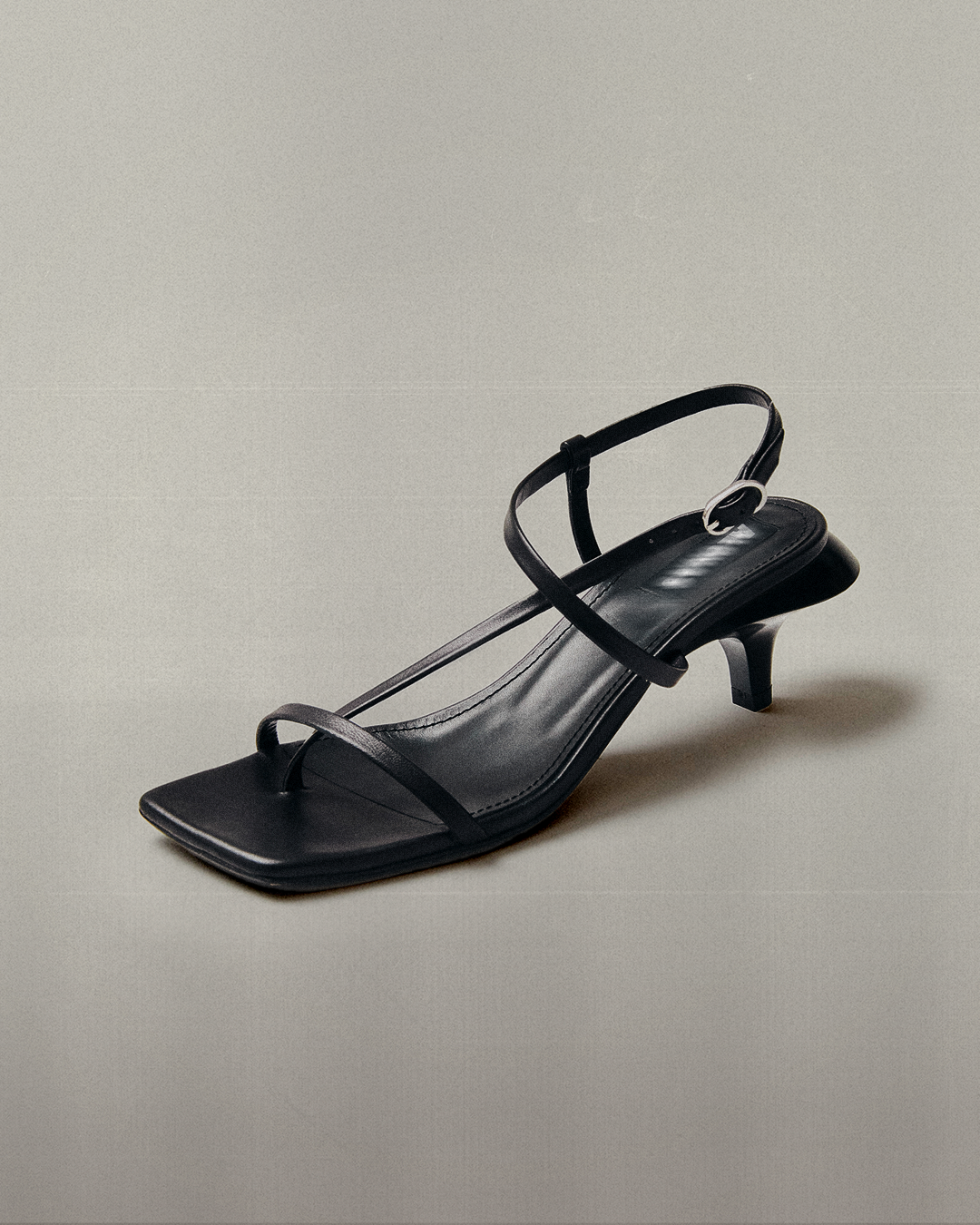
Modern kitten heels

A kitten heel is a short stiletto heel less than 5 cm (2 inches) in height, with a slight curve setting the heel in from the back edge of the shoe. The style was popularized by Audrey Hepburn in 1964, and more recent followers of the fashion as of the 2010s included Theresa May, Michelle Obama, and Hillary Clinton.

Shoes with kitten heels may be worn at work in an office setting by people who wish to wear feminine attire that is still practical. For parties, kitten heels are an alternative for those who find high heels uncomfortable.

== Definition ==
Kitten heels are shoes with a tapered heel of approximately 2.5 to 5 centimeters (1–2 in) in height. They are on the shorter end of stiletto shoes, which can have heels as tall as 12.5 centimeters (5 in).

== History ==
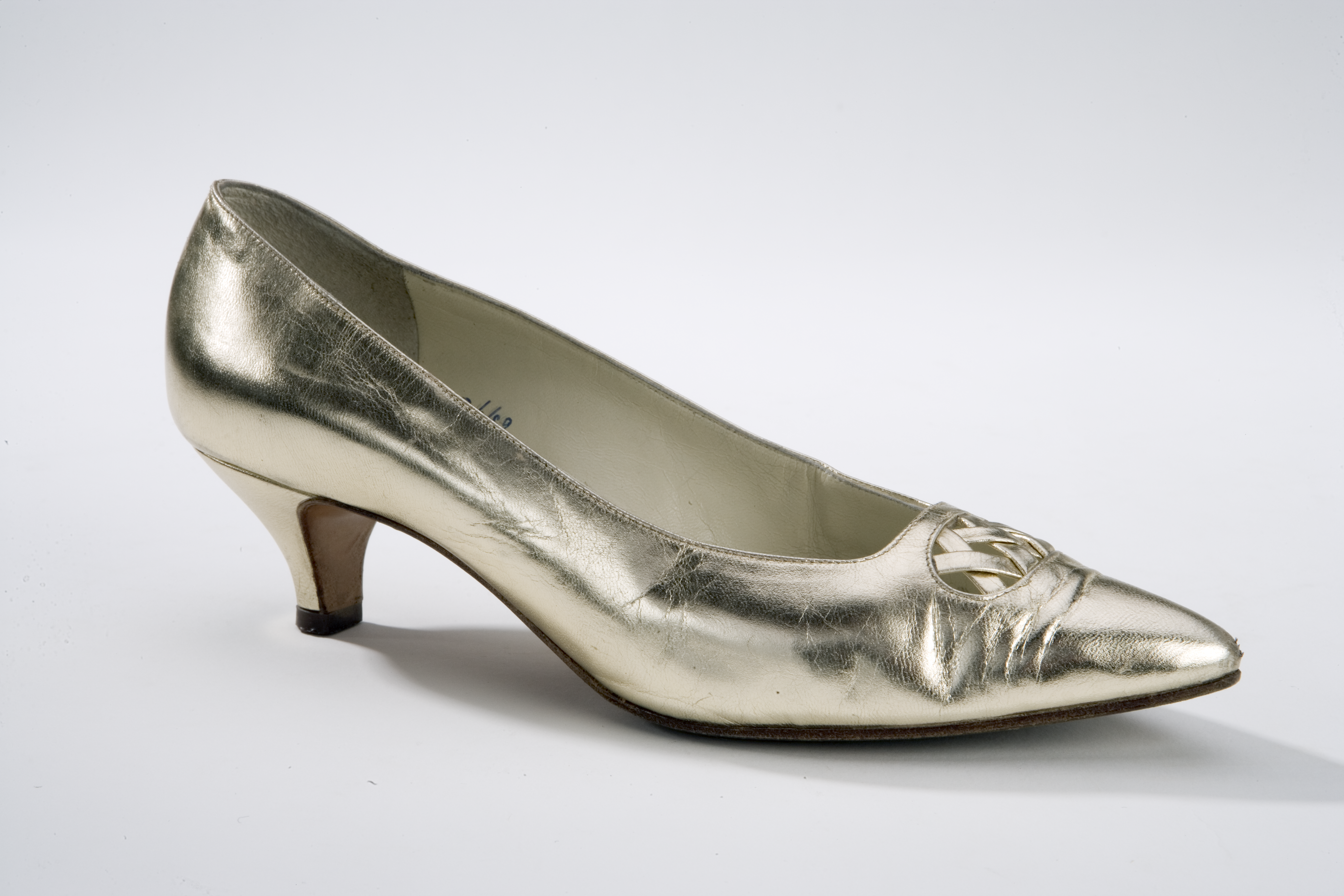
Example of 1950s kitten heels

Kitten heels were introduced in the late 1950s, as formal fashion attire for young adolescent girls, as higher heels would have been considered unseemly for girls as young as thirteen because of, for instance, the unease of walking on them. They were sometimes referred to as "trainer heels" in the US, indicating their use in getting young girls used to wearing high heels. However, by the early 1960s, they became fashionable for older teenagers and eventually for women of all ages. The demise of the stiletto heel in the late 1960s meant that women could choose between a wider variety of intermediate length heels, which decreased the appeal of the kitten heel.

However, the kitten heel reemerged in the 1980s along with wedge heels, and once again became fashionable since 2003 in spite of the preference for stiletto heels by women during this time period, due in part to the widespread influence of the television series Sex and the City. A variant combining kitten heels with flip-flops known as "kit-flops" became popular in the late 2010s.

== See also ==
- List of shoe styles
