= Trickle-down fashion =

Model of product adoption in marketing

Trickle-down fashion is a model of product adoption in marketing that affects many consumer goods and services.

It states that fashion flows vertically from the upper classes to the lower classes within society, each social class influenced by a higher social class. Two conflicting principles drive this diffusion dynamic. Lesser social groups seek to establish new status claims by adopting the fashions of higher social groups in imitation, whilst higher social groups respond by adopting new fashions to differentiate themselves. This provokes an endless cycle of change, driving fashion forward in a continual process of innovation.

Due to this dynamic, initially, a product may be so expensive that only the wealthy can afford it. Over time, however, the price will fall until it is inexpensive enough for the general public to purchase.

== History and evolution of the term ==
The trickle down theory has been modified greatly from the Veblen–Jhering model, produced in the end of the 19th century, to date. However, it provides an overall theory of how novelty is first introduced then disseminated throughout society.

=== Von Jhering ===
The German jurist Rudolf von Jhering is probably the first author who developed a full theory of cultural diffusion from the upper classes to the lower classes, applied to fashion, in his book Der Zweck im Recht (second volume, 1883). The French sociologist Émile Durkheim summarizes Von Jhering's theory: "[According to this author, fashion] is the result of the need for superior classes to distinguish themselves on the outside from the inferior classes. Because on one side the latter constantly tend to imitate the former, fashion spreads in society by means of contagion. But, on the other side, because it lost all its value once it is adopted by everybody, it is condemned by its very nature to renew itself continuously".

=== Simmel ===
Georg Simmel described the trickle-down theory of fashion in his 1904 article. He does not cite von Jhering.

=== Veblen ===
The theory of conspicuous consumption was introduced by Thorstein Veblen in his book The Theory of the Leisure Class. The oldest theory of distribution, it poses that people spend money on obtaining luxury goods and services to give an indication of their wealth to other members of society. He highlights society's endless quest for novelty maintaining that 'elegance' or elaborateness of dress, and new styles, which are both indicative of expense, are the main drivers of fashion change. Each social class imitates the consumption behaviour of the class above it in order to enhance their social status.

When applied to fashion, this theory states that when the lowest social class, or simply a perceived lower social class, adopts the fashion, it is no longer desirable to the leaders in the highest social class. The theory has been associated with later trickle-down theories as importantly, Veblen also observed that the upper classes found more extravagant ways of exercising conspicuous consumption in order to differentiate themselves from the class imitating their original consumption behaviour.

=== Fallers ===
Lloyd A. Fallers of the East African Institute of Social Research put forth this hypothesis in 1954:

The trickle effect is a mechanism for maintaining the motivation to strive for social success, and hence for maintaining efficiency of performance in occupational roles, in a system in which differential success is possible for only a few. Status-symbolic consumption goods trickle down, thus giving the "illusion" of success to those who fail to achieve differential success in the opportunity and status pyramid. From this point of view the trickle effect becomes a "treadmill".

In a society experiencing social and economic progress, "...the entire population has been upwardly mobile. From this point of view, the status-symbolic goods and services do not 'trickle down' but rather remain in fixed positions; the population moves up through the hierarchy of status-symbolic consumption patterns."

=== McCracken ===
In his book Culture and Consumption (1990), Grant McCracken aims to rehabilitate the trickle-down theory by expanding it for modern day application and use in the study of contemporary fashion. He adapts the theory to include groups that assume superordinate and subordinate roles in the modern trickle-down process but are not necessarily defined in terms of social strata. He includes other demographics such as gender, age and ethnicity. McCracken also acknowledges that the trickle down effect does not necessitate the appropriation of style but that the group can selectively borrow aspects of fashion, maintaining some of its own qualities. He also accounts for the influence of distribution, investors and location in relation to the trickle-down effect.

== The trickle-down theory in fashion ==
The trickle-down theory has long been identified as a central principle of explanation for the historical study of fashion and its sociological implications.

When applied to fashion, the theory states that a style is first offered and adopted by the top strata of society and gradually becomes accepted by subordinate groups. This is because fashion is considered a vehicle of conspicuous consumption and upward mobility within society and allowed people to express their individuality whilst maintaining the security of conformity with other members of their social stratum. When a lower social class, or a class simply perceived to be subordinate, adopt the fashion, it is rejected by the superordinate social class as it is no longer desirable, and another fashion assumed.

The trickle-down theory offers a straightforward way of predicting fashion diffusion. If a lesser social group begins to appropriate superordinate fashion by wearing cheaper versions of styles, the superordinate group will likely differentiate themselves by assuming a new trend, leading to further acts of appropriation by the subordinate group.

A trickle-down theory that supplies a cultural context can predict not only the fact that the fashion change will take place but also the direction and properties of the change.

The affordability aspect of the trickle-down theory is still highly applicable to the contemporary fashion industry. This can be seen, for example, when looking at the movement of a trend from the catwalk to the high street. When a catwalk trend is assumed by the affluent at a high price, comparable pieces may be released by high street stores at a cheaper price to meet the demand of the perceived lower classes, who seek to imitate the fashion behavior of the affluent.

Furthermore, it has been claimed that in most cases the diffusion of trends follows a trickle-down movement, even when at a quick glance they seem to be emerging from the street (Bubble-up model). Often, an innovation that seems to originate from the fringes of society does not become a trend until it is adopted by some form of "elite" within a society. In other words, a single product can be originated from the streets, but the process that turns its adoption into a trend requires some form of elite to leverage the masses, hence it is nothing but a trickle-down in disguise.

Basically, in a shorter description who started the trend in the upper class and how they influenced others to use/wear/carry on the trend down to the lower class.

== Criticisms ==
Whilst the theory has received attention due to its pioneering nature, conceptual development and its use in subsequent and related explanations of fashion diffusion and change, it faces many criticisms.

In a revision of the theory, McCracken states that Simmel does not explain the trickle down effect in its full detail and complexity, failing to account for the fact that only the lowest and highest-ranking groups in society have a single motive for their consumer behaviour. The lowest-ranking group have no lower group from which they must differentiate themselves so act solely in imitation whilst the highest-ranking group acts only to differentiate themselves as they have no higher-ranking social group to imitate. All intermediate groups, however, may have a dual motive. They may act either in imitation, in differentiation or both.

He also holds that whilst the theory may have been an accurate representation of fashion at the turn of the 19th century, when Simmel and Veblen were writing, the Simmel–Veblen model has little place in today's society. Firstly, the modern social and marketing environment is different to the class system that existed before.

This is because elite fashion has largely been replaced by mass fashion, which does not involve the same dynamic of imitation and differentiation observed by the trickle-down effect. The power of fashion depends on communication; the more fashion information is communicated, the more human fashion behaviour is impacted. Fashion information in contemporary society is democratised; it is no longer solely the upper class that has the ability to affect fashion behaviour, but a range of social classes and groups. Mass media exposure through televised fashion information, fashion magazines and editorials have allowed simultaneous adoption of new styles at all levels of society.

It is generally accepted among fashion researchers that fashions propagate more across social classes rather than trickle down (or up) as consumers tend to be more influenced by opinion leaders within their own social groups. As a result, each social group has its own fashion innovators who determine fashion trends.

Another criticism is that fashion is innately disorderly and complex. Trying to assign order to a complex phenomenon that usually consists of a range of factors including imitation and differentiation, adoptions and rejects all in relation to an individual's social surroundings has restricted the theory.

== See also ==
- Diffusion (business) – Process by which the market accepts a new idea or product
- Mass-market theory – Fashion marketing strategy
- Prole drift – Class of wage-earners
- Osborne effect – Sales impact of premature product announcements
- Trickle-up fashion – Fashion theory
- Varian Rule – Economics maxim
