= Information Rules =

1999 book by Carl Shapiro and Hal Varian

- A Strategic Guide to the Network Economy
- Author: Carl Shapiro and Hal Varian
- Language: English
- Subject: Network economy
- Genre: Non-fiction
- Publisher: Harvard Business School Press
- Publication date: 1999
- Publication place: United States
- Media type: Print
- ISBN: 978-0875848631

Information Rules is a 1999 book by Carl Shapiro and Hal Varian applying traditional economic theories to modern information-based technologies. The book examines commercial strategies appropriate to companies that deal in information, given the high "first copy" and low "subsequent copy" costs of information commodities, such as music CDs or original texts.

== Content ==
The book examines competing standards, and how a company might influence widespread consumer acceptance of one over another, such as VHS versus Betamax, or HD DVD versus Blu-ray. The book mentions possible business strategies of such publishers as Encyclopædia Britannica who have to confront how to stay viable as technology changes the value and availability of information.

== See also ==
- Knowledge and Decisions (book)
