= Stiletto heel =

Shoe with a tall, thin heel

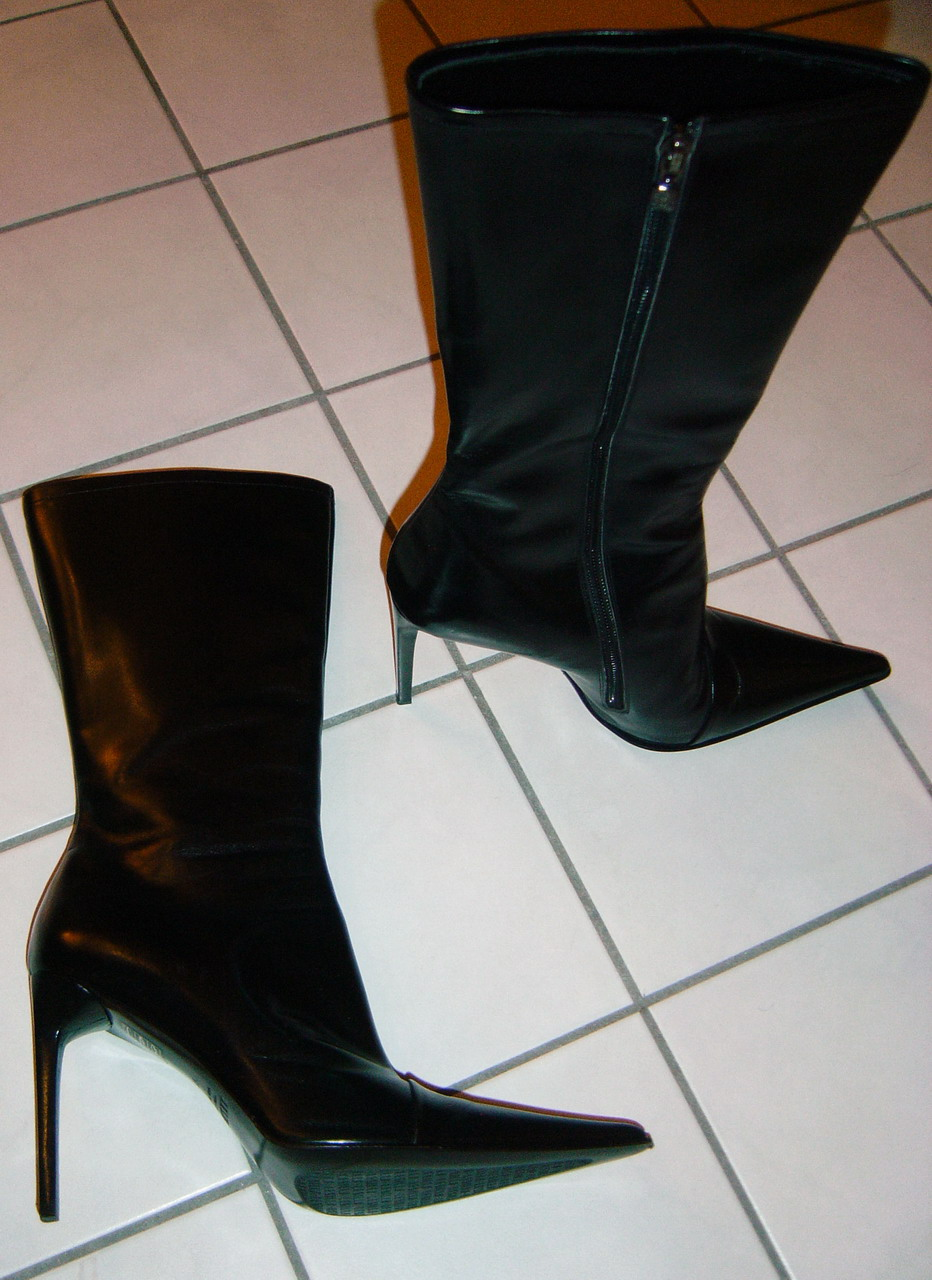
Stiletto heels can be found on almost every type of shoes, such as these boots.

A stiletto heel, or just stiletto, is a shoe with a long, thin, high heel. It is named after the stiletto dagger.

Stiletto heels may vary in length from 2.5 centimetres (1 inch) to 25 cm (10 inches) or more if a platform sole is used, and are sometimes defined as having a diameter at the ground of less than 1 cm (slightly less than half an inch). Stiletto-style heels 5 cm (2.0 in) or shorter are called kitten heels.

== History ==
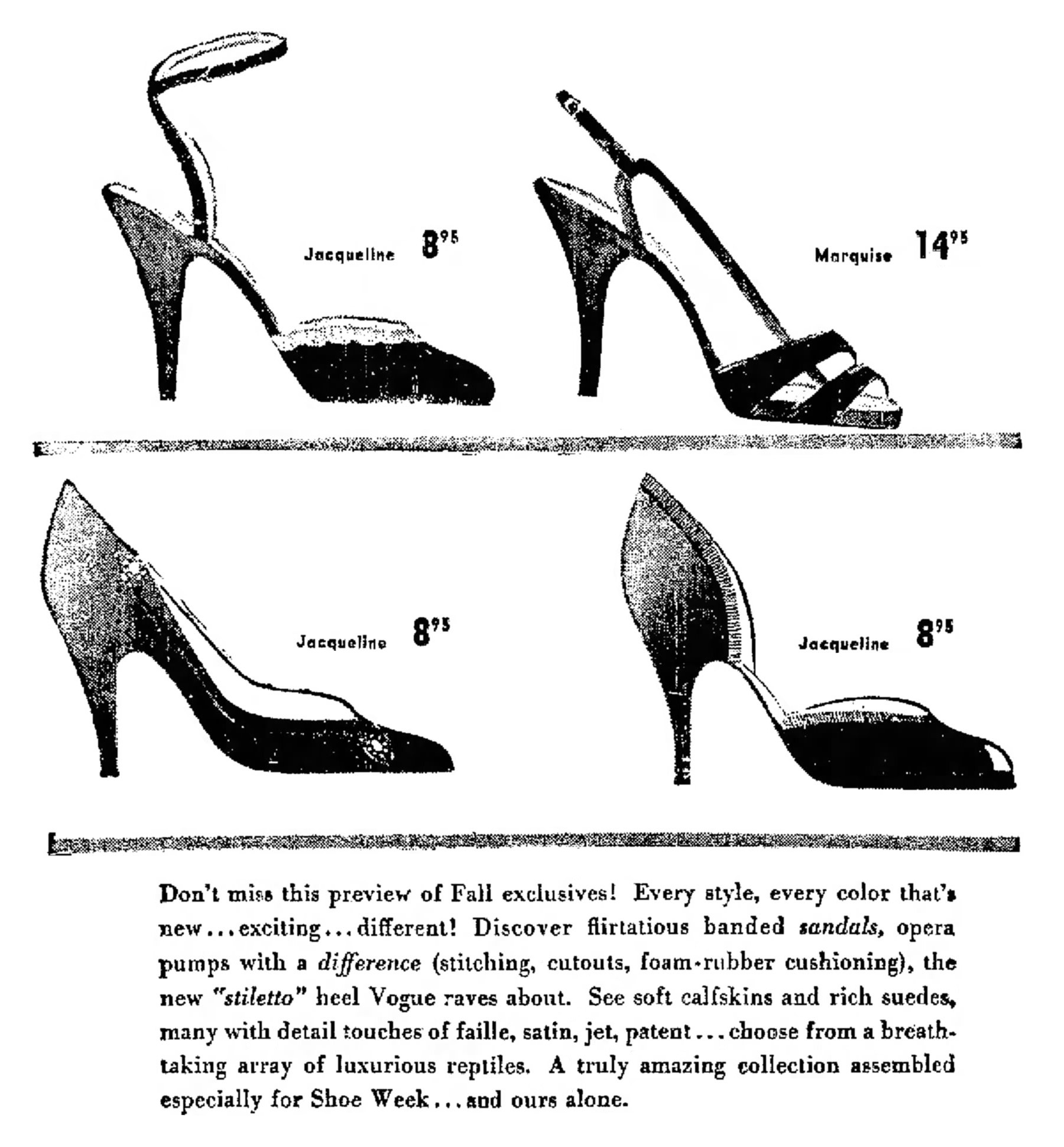
1952 newspaper ad for stiletto heels

High-heeled shoes were worn by men and women courtiers until the French Revolution. When high heels came back in style in the late 1800s, they were worn only by women. The stiletto heel came with the advent of technology using a supporting metal shaft or stem embedded into the heel, instead of wood or other, weaker materials that required a wide heel. Italian shoe designer Salvatore Ferragamo paved the way for stilettos by inventing the steel arch. Some historians also credit him with inventing the stiletto heel, while others credit French fashion designer Charles Jourdan. French designers such as Roger Vivier and André Perugia popularized the stiletto design in the 1950s, which quickly spread across Europe and the United States.

After an initial wave of popularity in the 1950s, the heels reached their most refined shape in the early 1960s, when the toes of the shoes which bore them became as slender and elongated as the stiletto heels themselves. As a result of the overall sharpness of outline, it was customary for women to refer to the whole shoe as a "stiletto", not just the heel, via synecdoche (pars pro toto). Although they faded from the scene after the Beatles era began, their popularity continued at street level, and women stubbornly refused to give them up even after they could no longer readily find them in the mainstream shops. A version of the stiletto heel was reintroduced in 1974 by Manolo Blahnik, who dubbed his "new" heel the "Needle". Similar heels were stocked at the big Biba store in London, by Russell & Bromley and by smaller boutiques. Old, unsold stocks of pointed-toe stilettos and contemporary efforts to replicate them (lacking the true stiletto heel because of changes in the way heels were by then being mass-produced) were sold in street fashion markets and became popular with punks and with other fashion "tribes" of the late 1970s until supplies of the inspirational original styles dwindled in the early 1980s. Subsequently, round-toe shoes with slightly thicker (sometimes cone-shaped) semi-stiletto heels, often very high in an attempt to convey slenderness were frequently worn at the office with wide-shouldered power suits. The style survived through much of the 1980s but almost completely disappeared during the 1990s when professional and college-age women took to wearing shoes with thick, block heels. The slender stiletto heel staged a major comeback after 2000 when young women adopted the style for dressing up office wear or adding a feminine touch to casual wear, like jeans.

== Image ==
Stilettos, like all similar high-heeled shoes, give the optical illusion of a longer, slimmer leg, a smaller foot, and overall greater height. They alter the wearer's posture and gait, flexing the calf muscles and making the bust and buttocks more prominent.

Stiletto heels are particularly associated with the image of the femme fatale. They are often considered to be a seductive item of clothing, and are fetishized as an erotic object by some.

== Disadvantages ==
All high heels counter the natural functionality of the foot, sometimes causing skeletal and muscular problems if users wear them excessively; such shoes are a common cause of venous complaints such as pain, fatigue, and heavy-feeling legs, and have been found to provoke venous hypertension in the lower limbs.

Stiletto heels concentrate a large amount of force into a small area. The great pressure under such a heel, which is greater than that under the feet of an elephant, can cause damage to carpets and floors. The stiletto heel, unless equipped with a "heel stopper" to enlarge the floor contact area, can be impractical for outdoor wear on soft ground (such as grass, sand or mud), or in environments where floor damage is unacceptable.

== See also ==
- List of shoe styles

== Bibliography ==
- Bergstein, Rachelle (2012). Women from the Ankle Down – The Story of Shoes and How They Define Us (Hardback). New York: HarperCollins. pp. 284. ISBN 978-0-06-196961-4.
