= André Perugia =

French shoe designer (1893–1977)

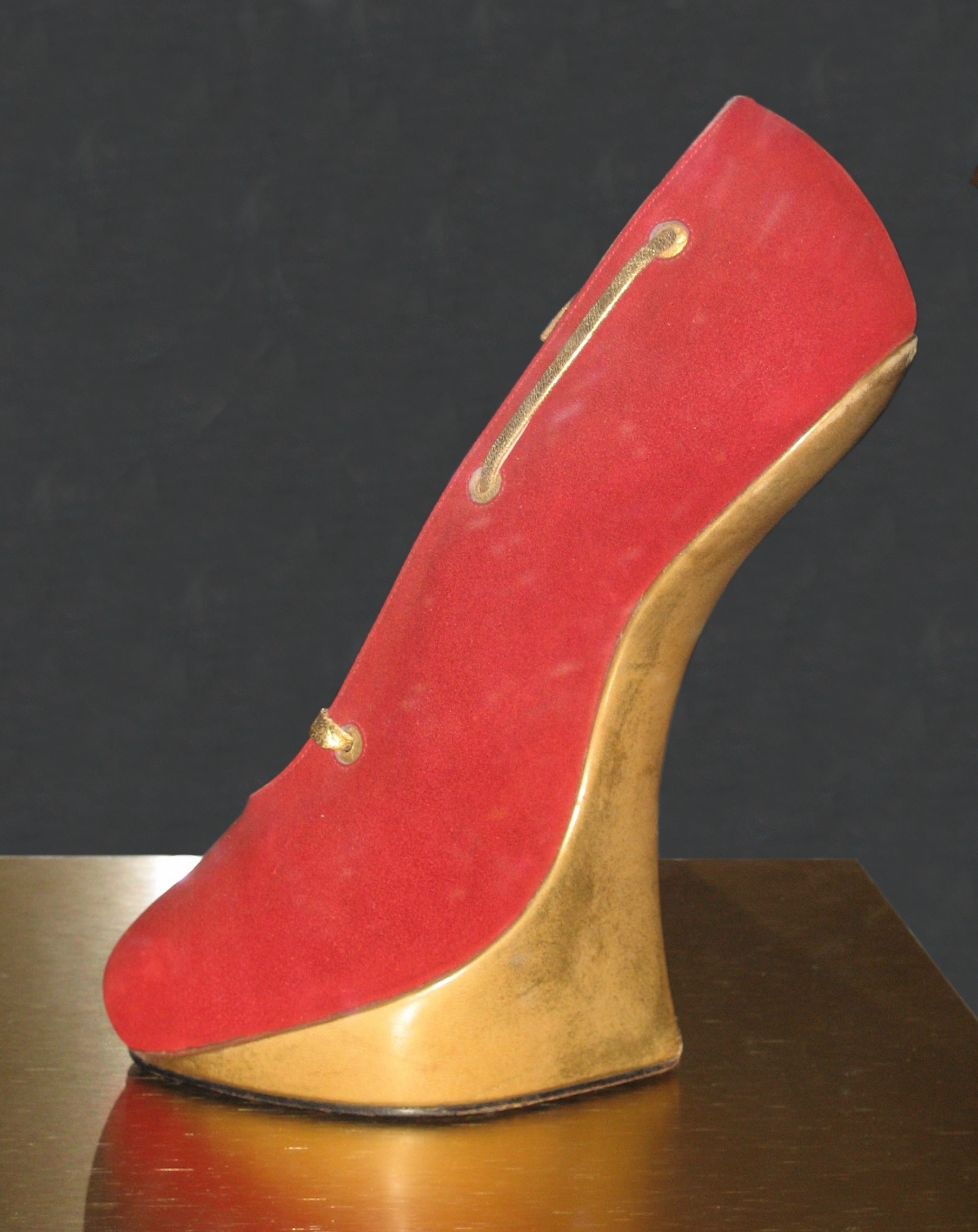
- Born: 7 March 1893; Tuscany, Italy
- Died: 22 November 1977 (aged 84); Cagnes-sur-Mer, France
- Known for: Shoe Design
- Spouse: Lucienne Legrand

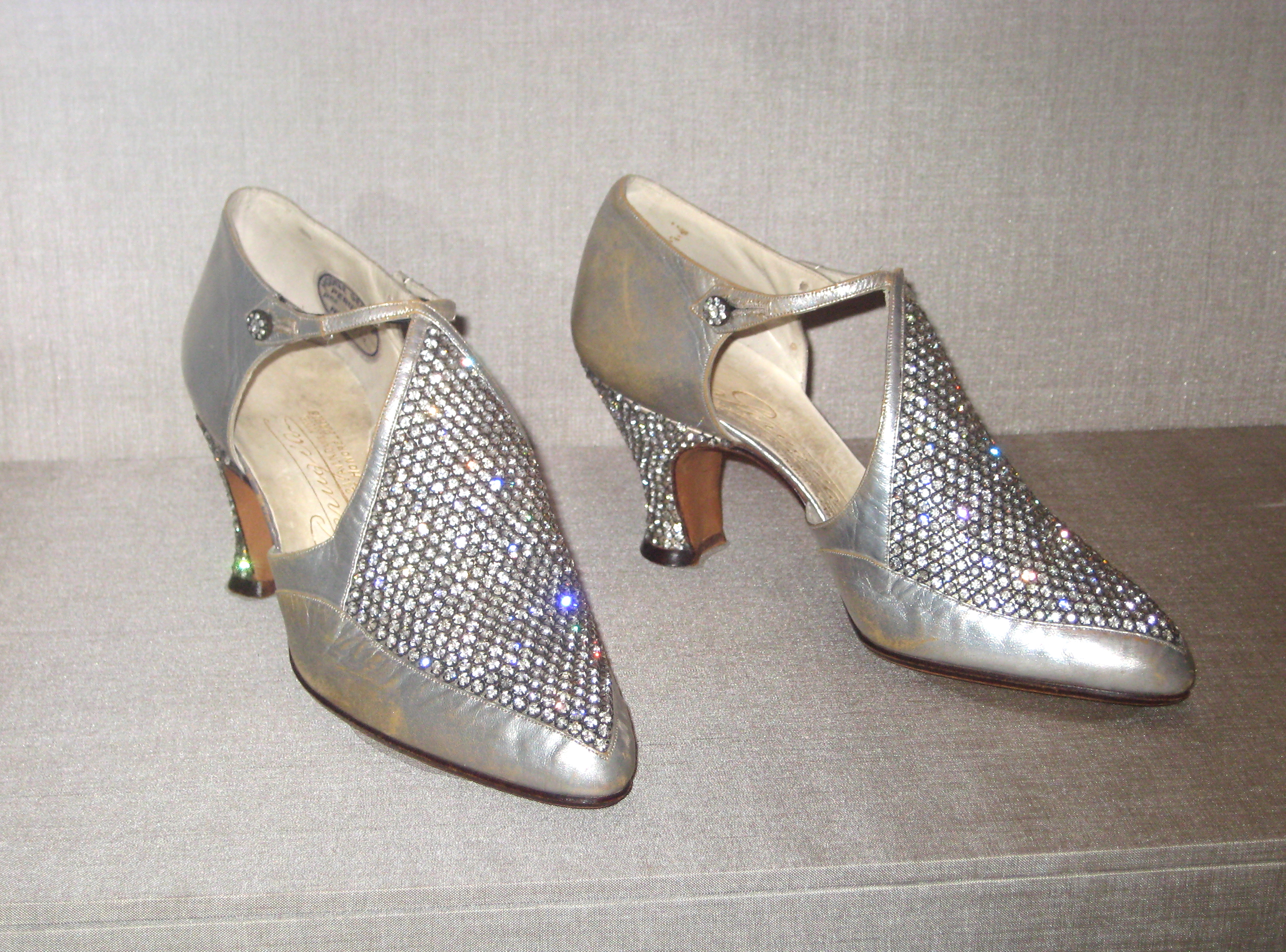
Silver Pumps with Rhinestones, 1928

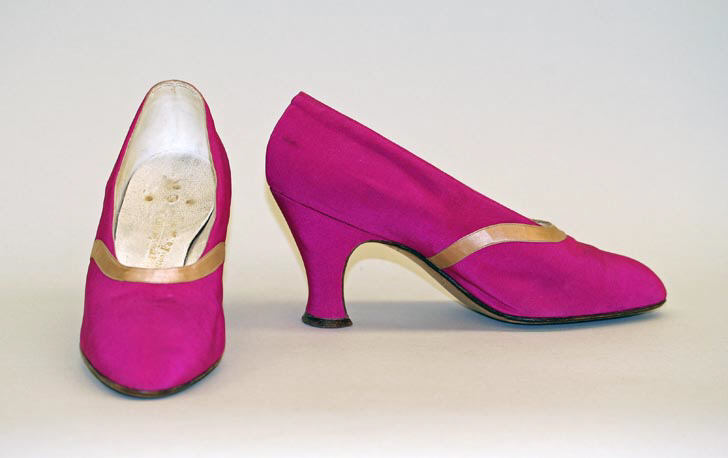
Shoe for Callot Soeurs 1932

André Perugia (7 March 1893 – 22 November 1977) was a French shoe designer who is regarded as a master of 20th-century footwear design. He was known for technically innovative and sculptural shoes, and for collaborations with major couturiers such as Paul Poiret and Elsa Schiaparelli.

== Biography ==
André Antoine Perugia was born in Tuscany, to a French mother and an Italian father who was a shoemaker, as was his father before him. When André was a child, his family moved to Nice, where they opened a shoe creation and repair shop. As André grew up, he learned how to make shoes, but he also began experimenting with shapes, materials, and structures and creating his own designs.

=== Paul Poiret ===
In 1912, the Hotel Negresco, Nice's new luxury hotel, allowed Perugia to put his designs in a lobby display. One of the hotel guests who saw the display was couturier Paul Poiret, known as the "King of Fashion", who was so impressed by Perugia's creations, he offered to help him establish himself in Paris. World War I broke out the following July. Perugia was still not a French citizen so, instead of being sent to fight, he was sent to work in an aircraft factory. Adding to what he had learned about shoe construction, and what he had taught himself about design, the rigorous engineering skills and understanding of material weight distribution required by aircraft construction became the basis of his career. Years later, he stated: "A pair of shoes must be as perfect as an equation and adjusted down to the last millimetre, like a piece of an engine."

In 1921, Perugia took Poiret up on his offer and moved to Paris. In 1922, he opened his first boutique, at 11 Rue du Faubourg Saint-Honoré. Poiret was no longer in a position to help Perugia financially, but he introduced him to his clients and the shop was an immediate success. His client list quickly grew and included socialite Hortense Acton, and many stars from film and the Folies Bergère—Andrée Spinelly made Perugia her exclusive shoemaker and Mistinguett was said to own 90 pairs of Perugia shoes. Another loyal customer was Josephine Baker; in 1928, Perugia turned her trademark turban into the quilted kidskin “Turban Sandal”. By 1925, Poiret's business had collapsed, but the collaboration produced notable innovations, such as the first pair of evening shoes to be entirely covered in rhinestones, and “The Roses”, an embroidered pair of pumps made for Poiret's wife Denise.

=== I. Miller & Sons ===
In 1922, Perugia opened a shop in Nice. In Paris, in 1923, he took the space down the road, at 6 Rue du Faubourg Saint-Honoré, and opened Enzel, an elegant boutique, and brand, that allowed him to mass-produce and market versions of his luxury line shoes. While it appears that Perugia was the sole owner of the company, he called himself the ‘Technical Director’, and the reason for choosing the name is unclear; in various languages, 'Enzel' means ‘individual’, ‘happy one’ or ‘deity’.

The creation of Enzel was likely spurred by a new business arrangement with Israel Miller, president of one of America's largest shoe manufacturers and retailers, I. Miller & Sons. Miller had lived in Paris and was a regular visitor to the city. Whether one had sought out the other is unknown, but Miller would have been aware of Perugia's popularity. It is possible that Miller was an investor or partner in Enzel, as Miller was in the process of an expansion that would soon see 200 retail outlets opened in the U.S. He was also expanding in New York; he had a flagship store on Fifth Avenue, but he had negotiated a long-term lease on 1554 Broadway, in Times Square, and also took 1552 Broadway which had a frontage on West 46th Street. Miller had the West 46th street facade elaborately re-designed and, in 1926, it opened as ‘The Corner of Paris’, with Perugia's shoes as the focus. Perugia's designs were produced in the Miller factory in Carlisle, Pennsylvania, where workers sometimes refused to make some of his more radical designs. But Perugia's innovations with Miller, which included such things as changeable heels, cage heels, and heel-less shoes, were snapped up by American women, as were the matching handbags and Perugia's new ‘sun tan’ stockings, an innovation which replaced the usual black or brown. Perugia's shoes were constantly seen on the feet of film stars such as Pola Negri, Gloria Swanson and Rita Hayworth. Perugia would stay with I. Miller for the rest of his career.

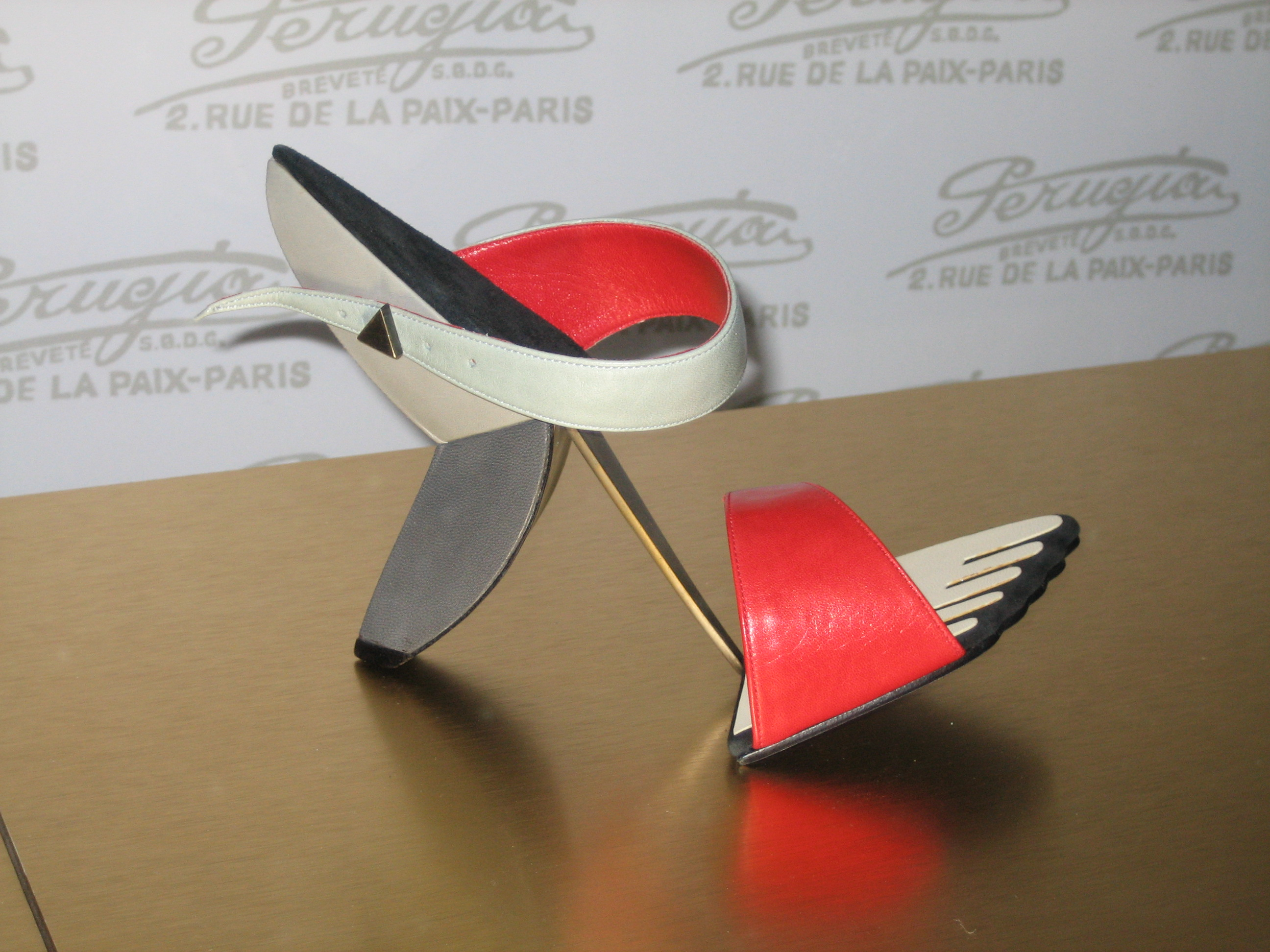
The "Homage to Picasso" sandal 1950

He wrote a book From Eve to Rita Hayworth in which he said that the way to unveil a woman's personality was to study her feet. Always eager to experiment with new materials, shapes, and textures, Perugia continued to create shoes of startling originality throughout a 50-year association with I. Miller and then with Charles Jourdan.

== Further reading and images ==
- Permanent collection, Metropolitan Museum of Art

== Gallery ==
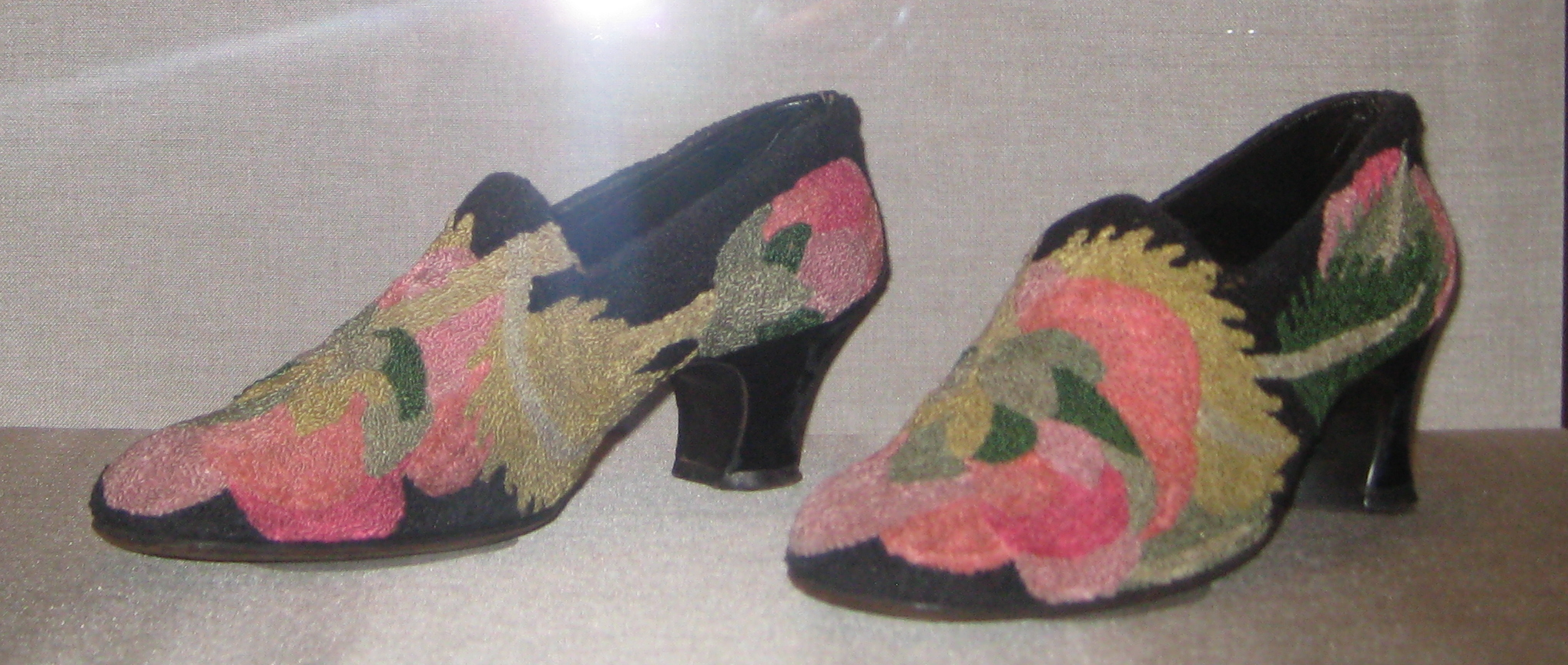
"The Roses", 1924

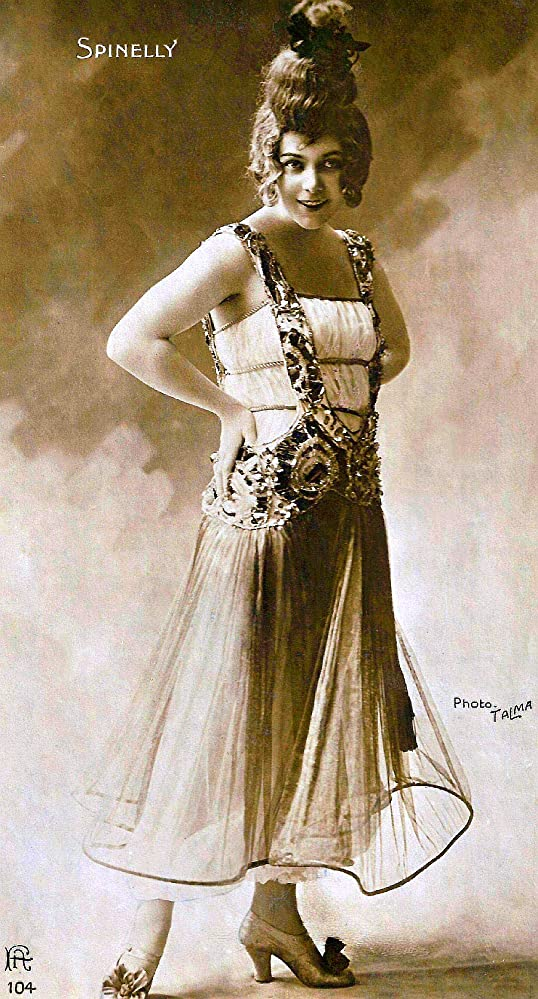
Spinelly in Perugias, 1925

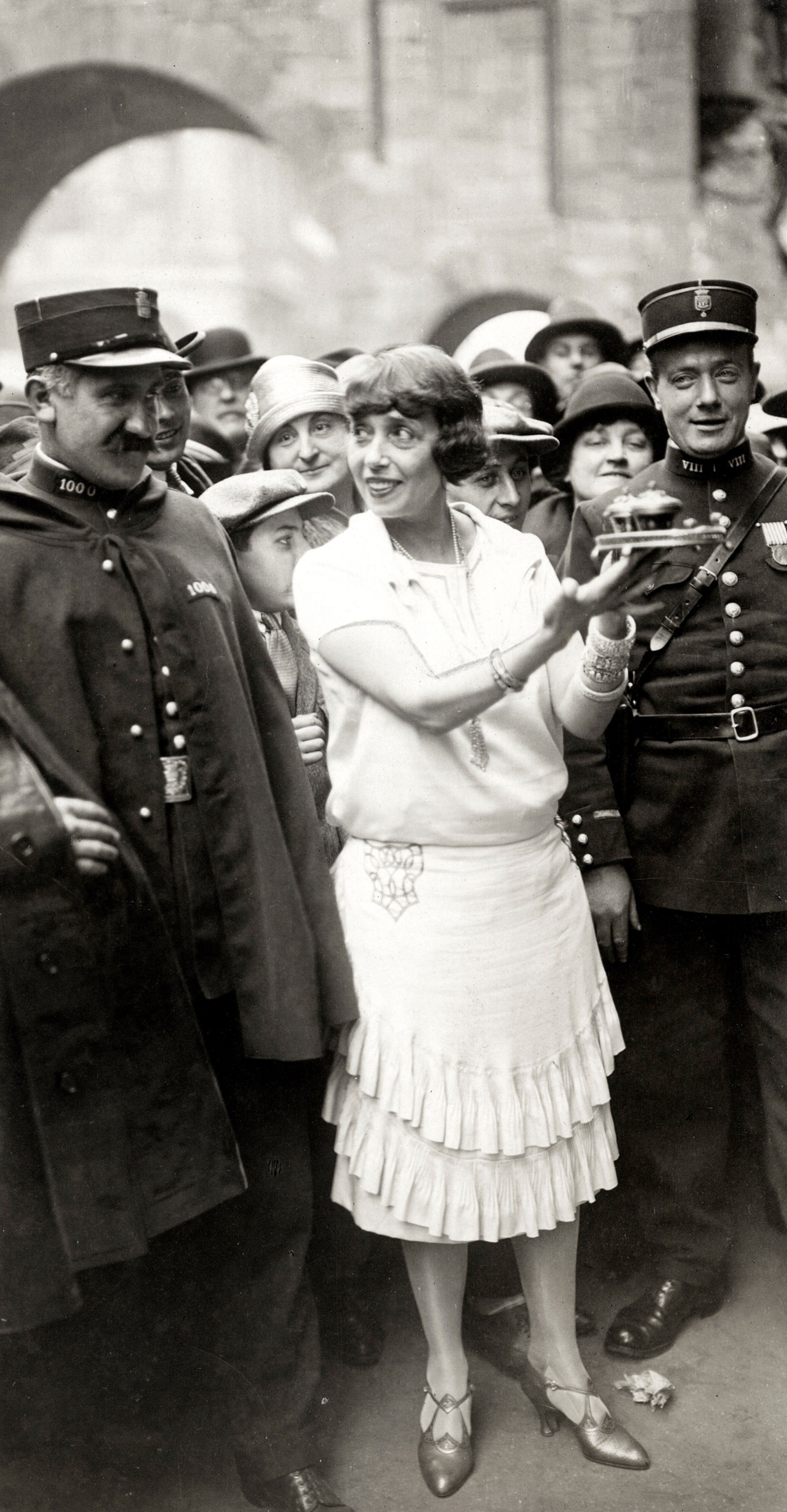
Mistinguett in Perugias, 1926

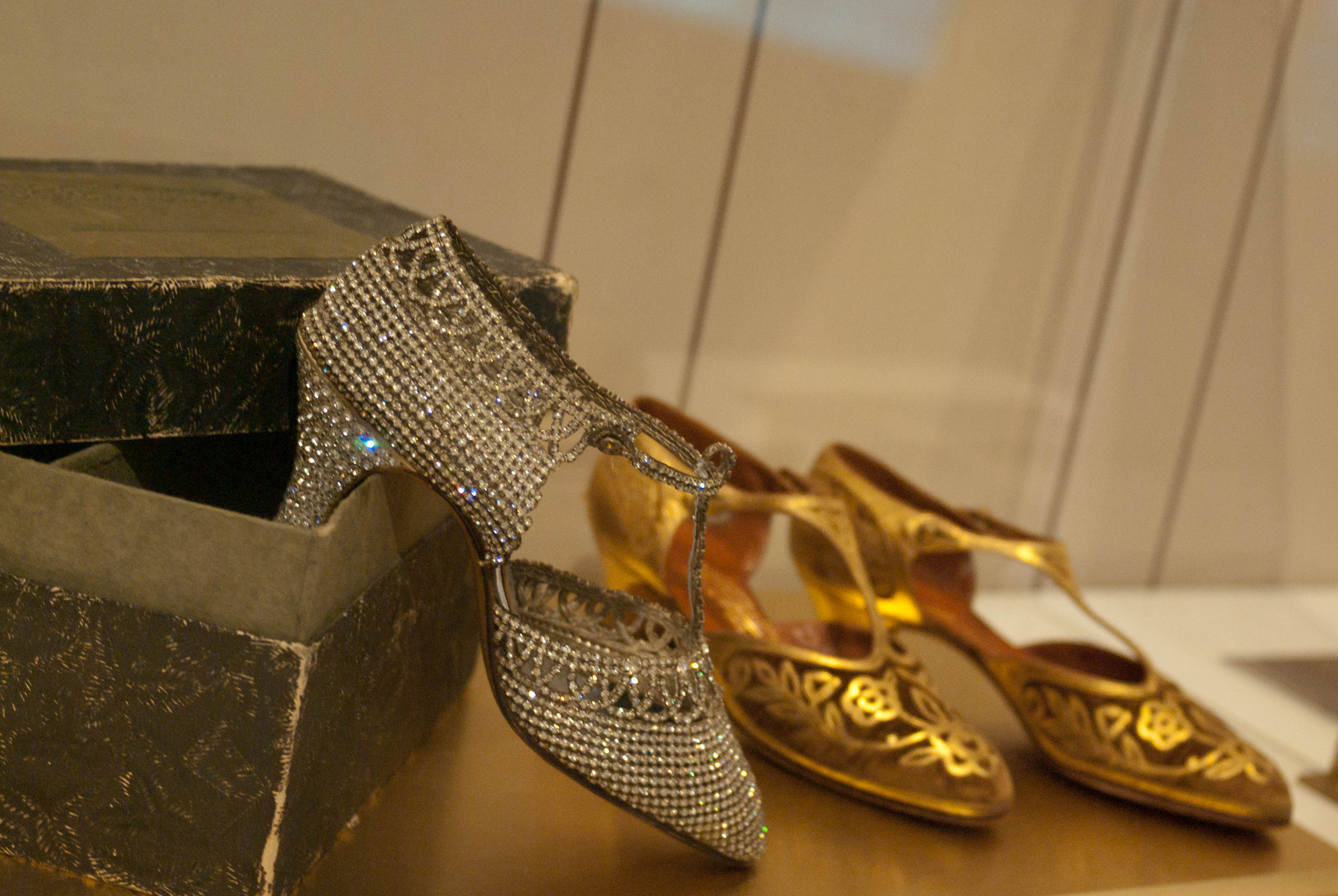
The Rhinestone Shoe, 1928

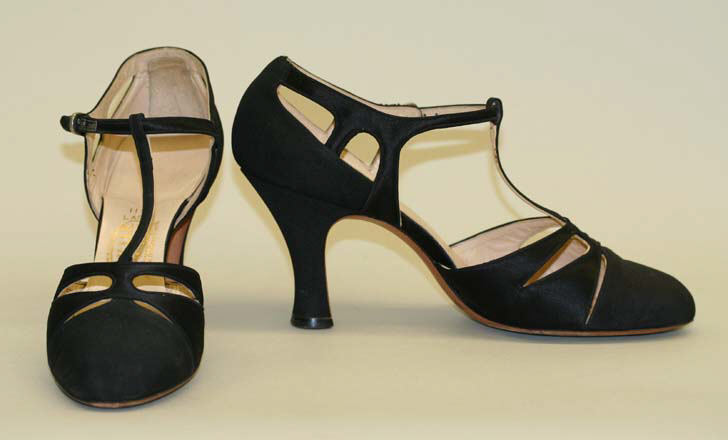
Suede Day Shoes for I. Miller, 1932 (attrib.)

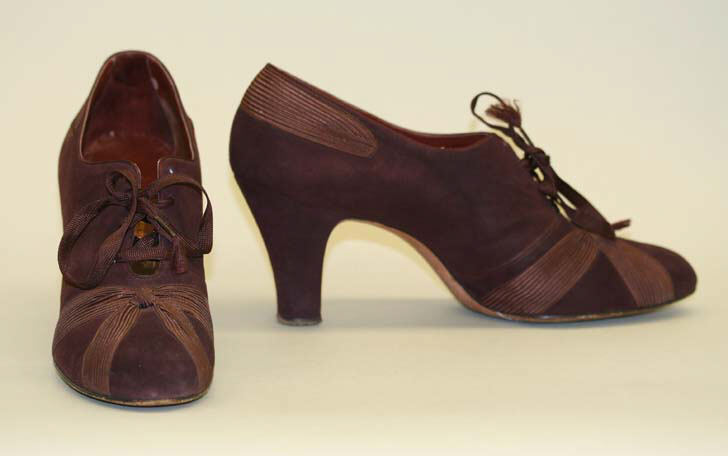
Suede & Silk Day Shoes for I. Miller, 1933 (attrib.)

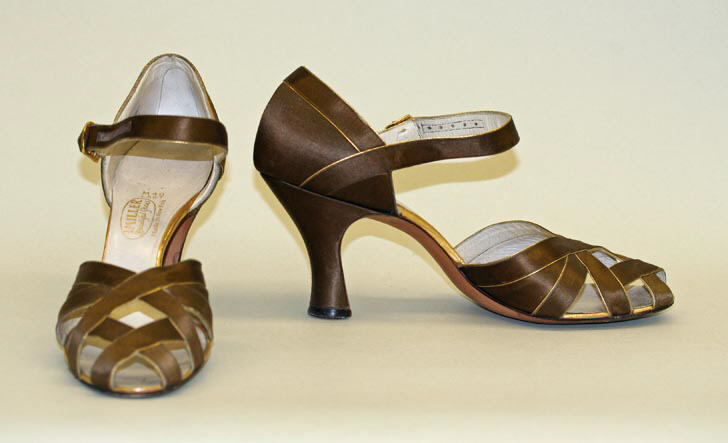
Evening Sandals for I. Miller, 1935 (attrib.)

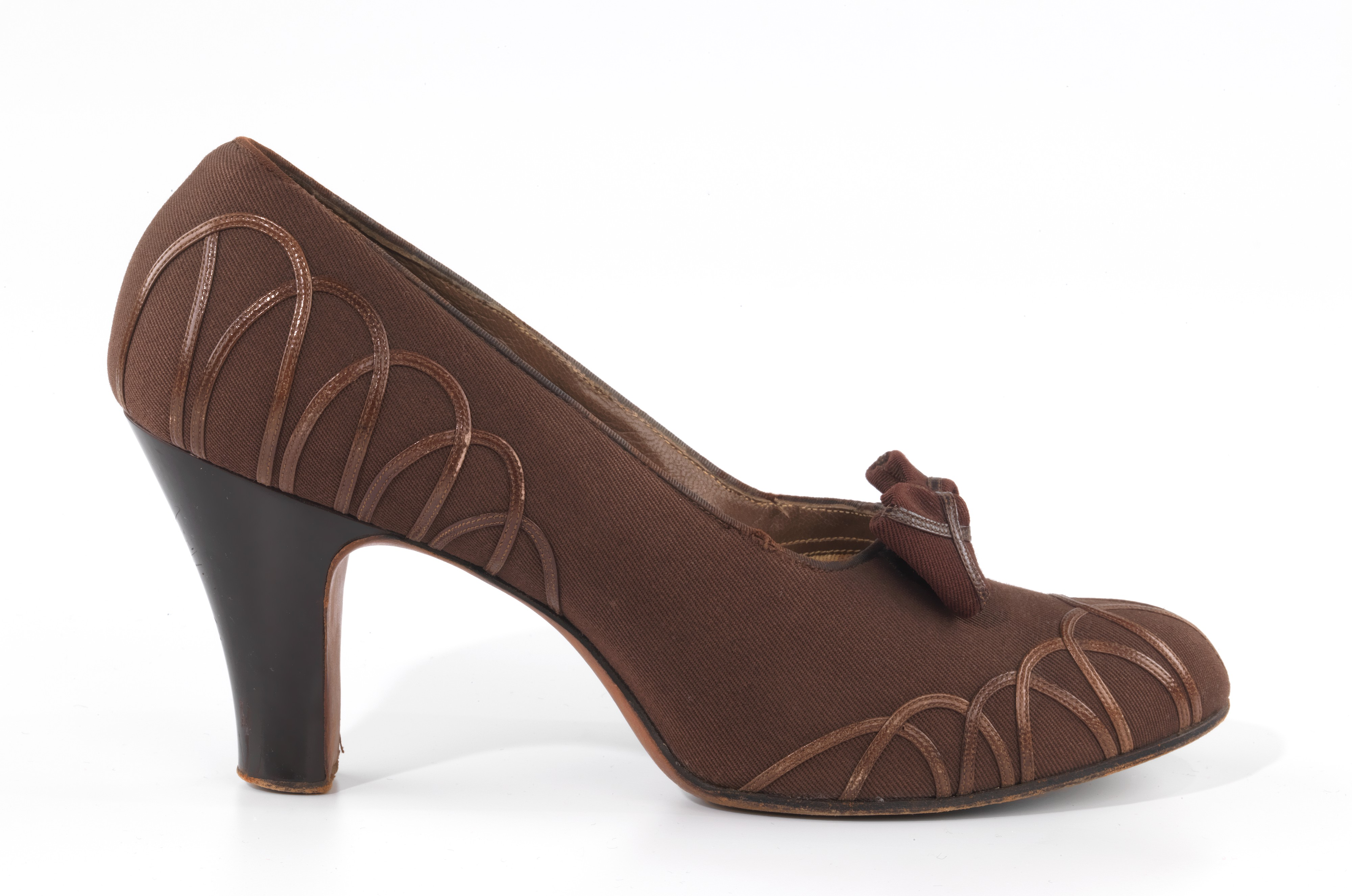
Suede & Leather Day Shoe for I. Miller, 1935 (attrib.)

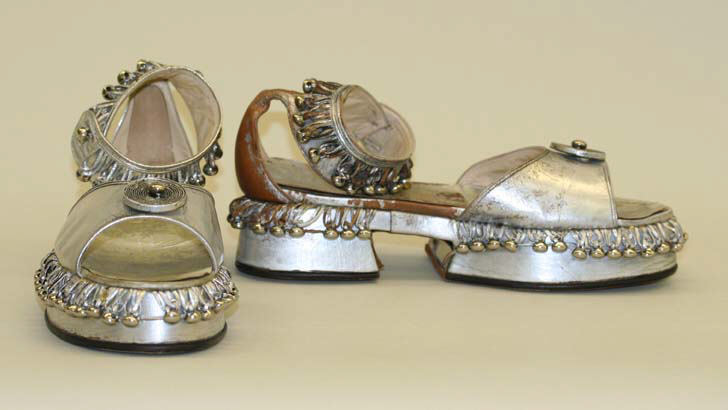
Silver Sandals for I. Miller, 1942 (attrib.)

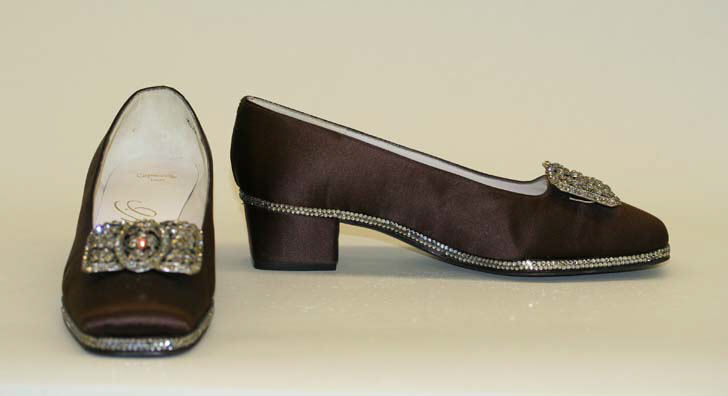
Silk & Rhinestone Pumps for I. Miller, 1967 (attrib.)
