= Dialta Alliata di Montereale =

Italian aristocrat

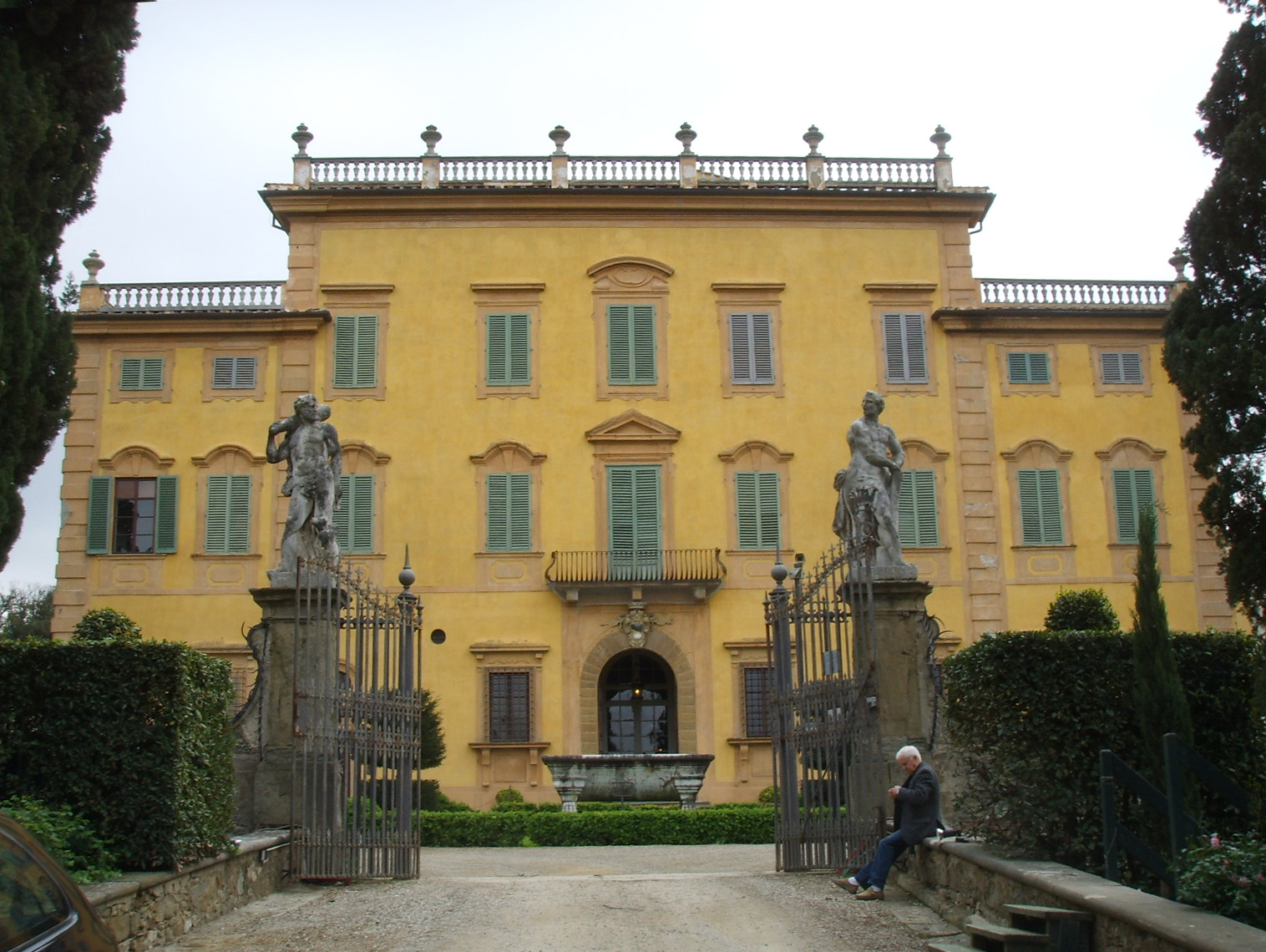
Villa La Pietra, Florence

Princess Dialta Alliata di Montereale is an Italian aristocrat who is involved in a 25-year court battle to claim a half-share of Arthur Acton's $1 billion art collection, and DNA testing has confirmed that she is his granddaughter.

When Acton's son Sir Harold Acton died in 1994, his father's vast art collection housed in the Villa La Pietra in Florence, Italy, was left to New York University (NYU), and now forms their overseas campus NYU Florence. Acton's alma mater, the University of Oxford, turned down the opportunity to take on Villa La Pietra, and NYU won the right to do so, and in 1996 were converting it into a conference and study centre based around the Actons' art collection.

The legal battle was started by Alliata's mother Liana Beacci (1917–2000), then aged 78, who claimed that Arthur Acton was her biological father, the result of a strong love affair between Arthur Acton and his secretary, Ersilia Beacci, Liana Beacci's mother, who died in 1953. DNA testing proved that Liana Beacci was Acton's daughter; although Beacci and Acton never married, under Italian law children born out of wedlock have inheritance rights.

With a judgment in 2017 the Court of Florence has decided that Liana Beacci was the biological daughter of Arthur Acton.Liana Beacci's heirs have claimed the rights to the inheritance of Arthur Acton and the proceedings are still pending before the Court of Florence. In Italy, all biological children have the same rights. Up to today Dialta has always won in court. Alliata has said, "I have five beautiful children, I have a fabulous husband. I'm happy. The fact is that it's a question of honour and principle."

== Personal life ==
She is married to Prince Vittorio di Montereale, they have five children, and live in Honolulu, Hawaii.
