= Madonna Addolorata al Torresino =

Church building in Padua, Italy

Coordinates: 45°24′01.48″N 11°52′19.42″E

The Madonna Addolorata al Torresino, also called the Santa Maria del Pianto or Santa Maria del Torresino is a Roman Catholic parish church located in the city of Padua, region of Veneto, Italy.

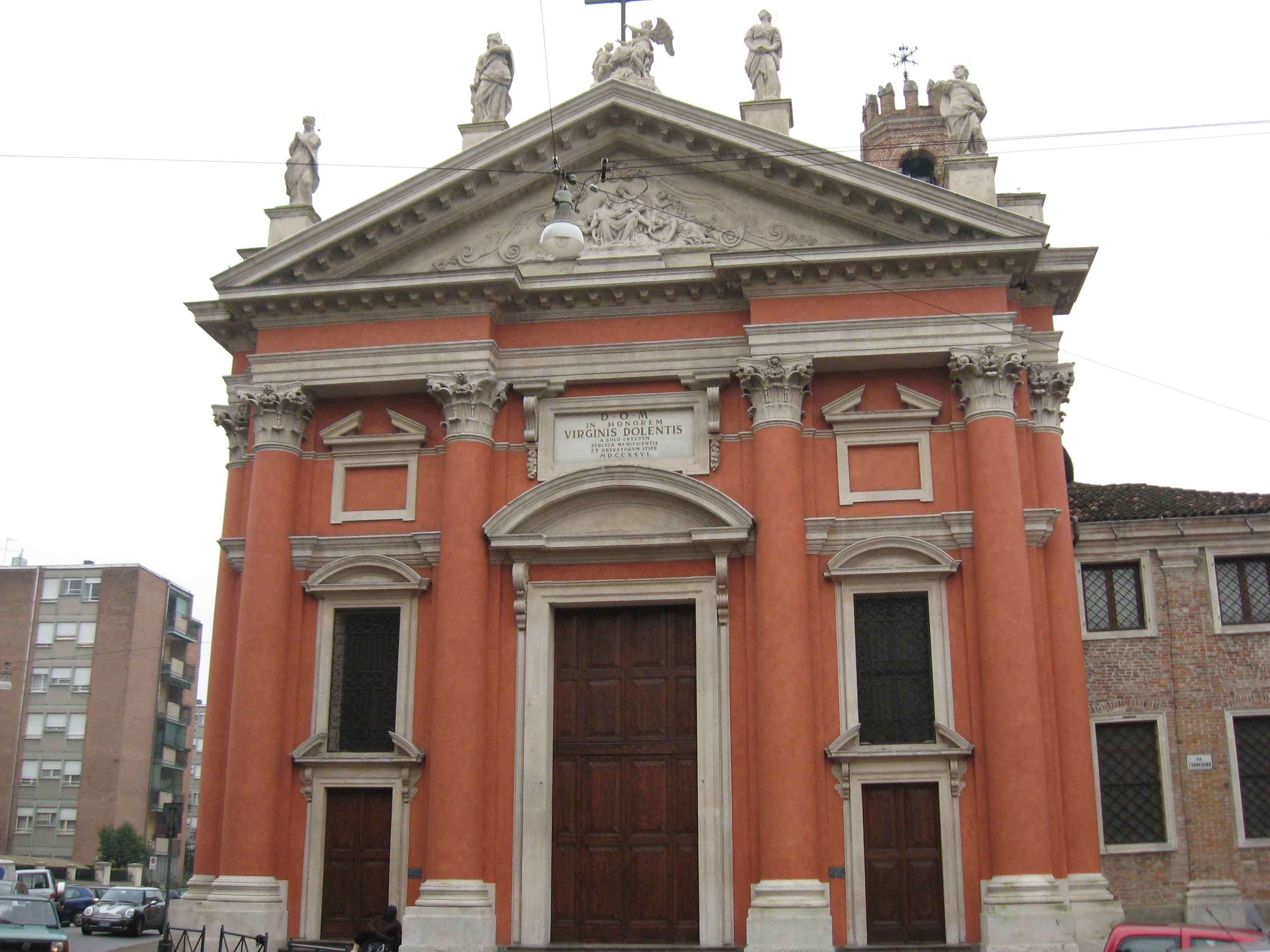
Facade

== History ==
An oratory was present at the site adjacent to a torresino (turret) of fortifications. By the 1450s, an icon of the Virgin, painted on a wall by an Antonio dal Santo, was said to fulfill miracles. The present church was built in 1718–1726 using designs by Girolamo Frigimelica Roberti, and completed by Sante Bonato. The church is presently still called "Torresino" due to the tower that crowns the dome, designed by Frigimelica.

The statues and bas-relief of the Pieta on the façade were completed by Francesco Bonazza. In the atrium are statues depicting Faith and Religion by Tommaso Bonazza. Antonio Bonazza also sculpted (1741) the eight statues depicting Patience, Prudence, Virginity, Purity, Humility, Charity, Chastity, and Innocence.

The first altar on the right has a canvas depicting Birth of Jesus by Giulio Cirello. The next altar on the right has a Padua thanks the Virgin for the end of the Plague in 1500 attributed to either Francesco Zanella or Francesco Onorati. Two other 18th-century altarpieces, depicting the births of Christ and the Virgin respectively, are by Guido-Ludovico de Vernansal.

The main altar has statues of St John the Evangelist and the Magdalen by Giovanni Bonazza. The main altarpiece is a wooden bas relief depicting the Pieta (1940) by Amleto Sartori. A painting depicting the Crucifixion lateral to the main altar is by Giulio Cromer. The church has French 18th-century Via Crucis canvases.
