= Orazio Marinali =

Italian sculptor (1643–1720)

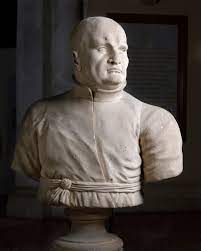
- Self-portrait
- Born: 24 February 1643; Angarano, Republic of Venice
- Died: 6 April 1720 (aged 77); Vicenza, Republic of Venice
- Known for: Sculpture
- Movement: Late-Baroque

Orazio Marinali (24 February 1643 – 6 April 1720) was an Italian late-Baroque sculptor, active mainly in the Veneto or Venetian mainland.

== Biography ==
Orazio Marinali was born in Angarano, near Bassano del Grappa, on 24 February 1643. He trained with Josse de Corte. Marinali carried out a number of commissions, including the decoration of palaces, gardens and parks. He is best known for over 150 statues produced by him and his studio for the estate and gardens of a single villa in Vicenza, the Villa Lampertico (also known as Villa Conti or La Deliziosa). Many are stock characters from commedia dell'arte theater; others depict the so-called bravi (desperadoes). They vary in quality, and are often executed in local stone. For the same villa garden, Marinali also completed a large fountain group: la Ruota, symbolizing the four corners of the world.

Other sets of figures include those he made for the Parco Revedin-Bolasco at Castelfranco, the Villa Trissino near Vicenza and the particularly fine Seasons in the Giardino Barnabò, Venice. The Marinali workshop was known also for the production of male and female marble busts, the former often characterized by almost grotesque exaggeration. Examples are at the Villa Pisani, Stra, two male busts are at Linz (Stadtmuseum).

Two self-portraits in stone by Orazio are extant (Bassano del Grappa, Musei Civici; Vicenza, Musei Civici di Archeologia e Storia); numerous terracotta bozzetti also survive and confirm his sculptural sensitivity. This sensitivity is also apparent in a notable album of his drawings (Bassano), which contains numerous imaginative examples of his favourite themes.

== Legacy ==
Many of Marinali's garden statues from the Vicenza area were removed to the Villa La Pietra outside Florence in the 20th century, to decorate gardens created there by Arthur Acton. They stand there alongside statues by the Paduan sculptor Antonio Bonazza who was influenced by Marinali. Among his pupils were Domenico Aglio and Lorenzo Mattielli, who married the daughter of Angelo Marinali, Orazio's brother and collaborator.

== Gallery ==
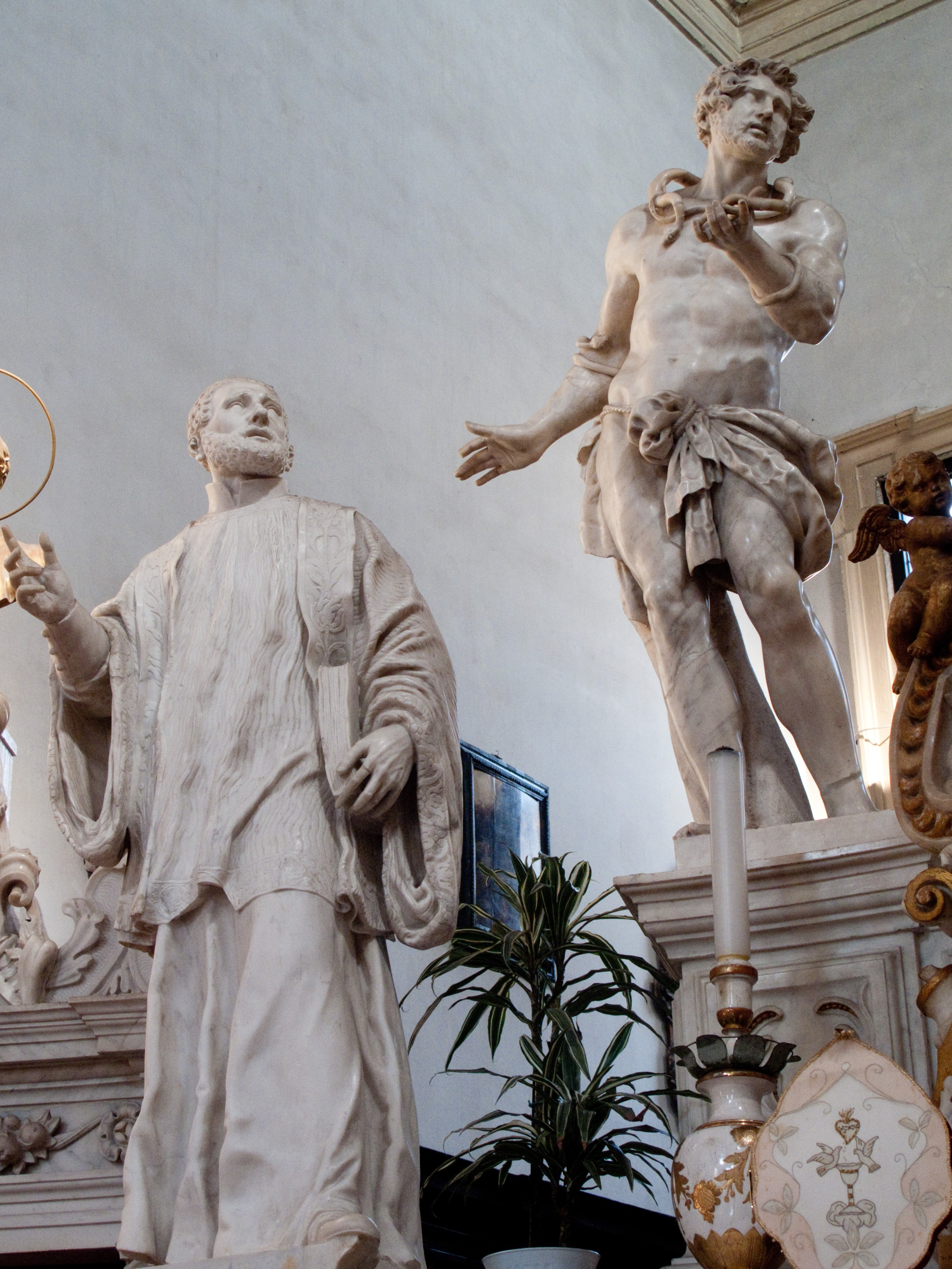
Statues of St. Gaetano Thiene and St. Giuliano in the Church of San Giuliano, Vicenza

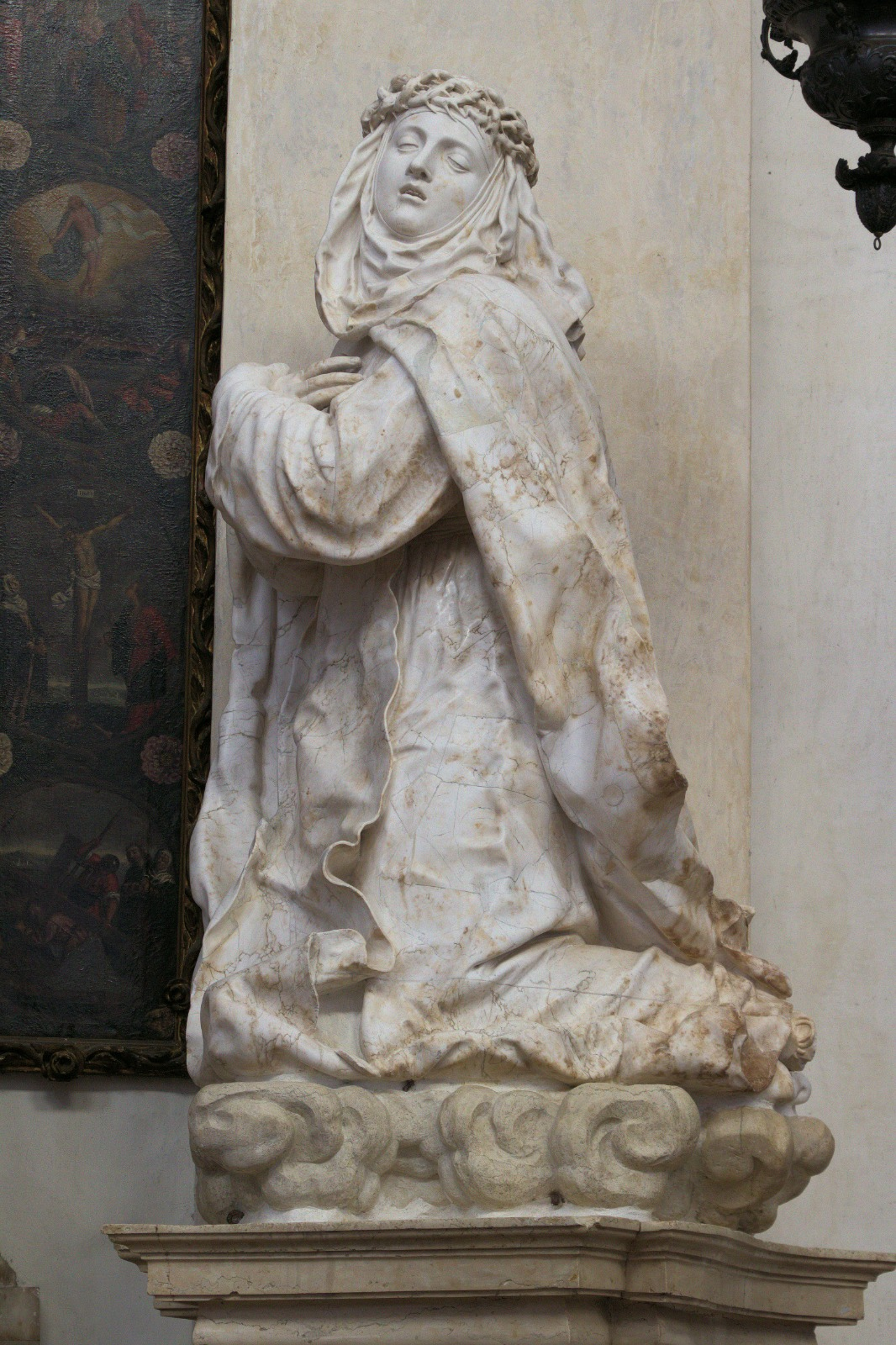
Statue of St. Catherine in Bassano Cathedral

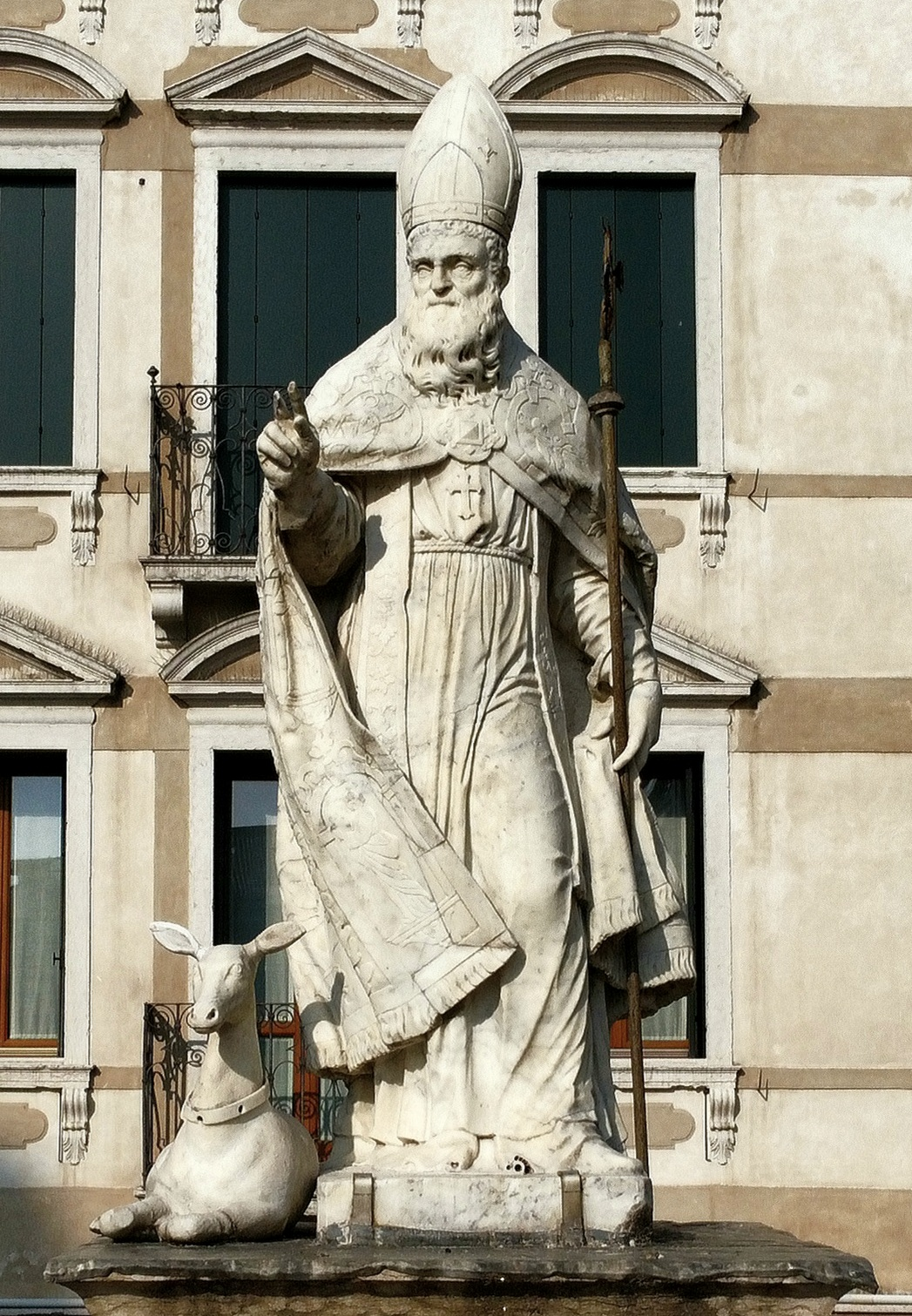
Statue of St. Bassianus in Bassano del Grappa, Vicenza

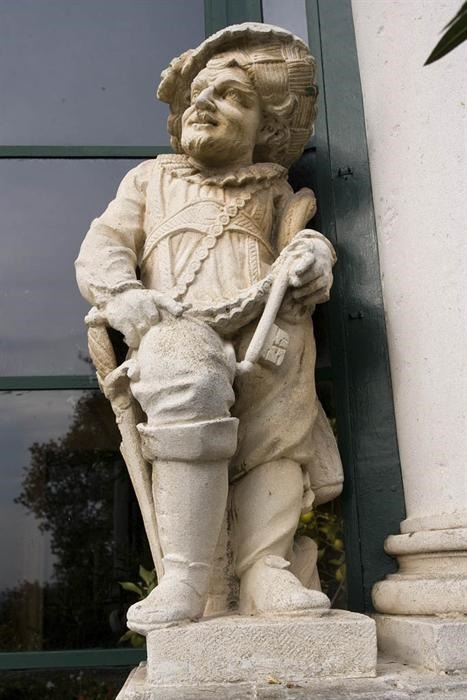
Statue of a dwarf in the garden of Villa Trento, Costozza di Longare (Vicenza)

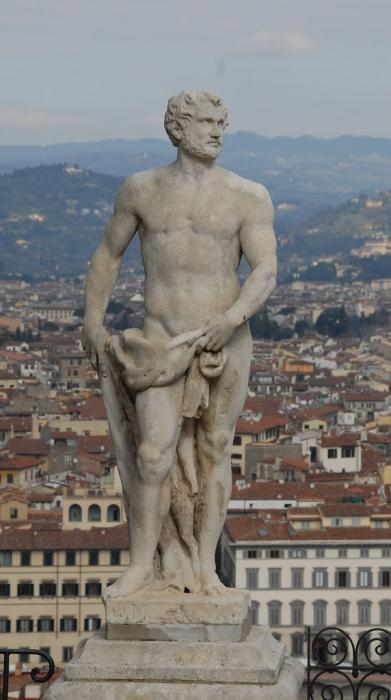
Statue of Hercules in the Giardino Bardini of Florence

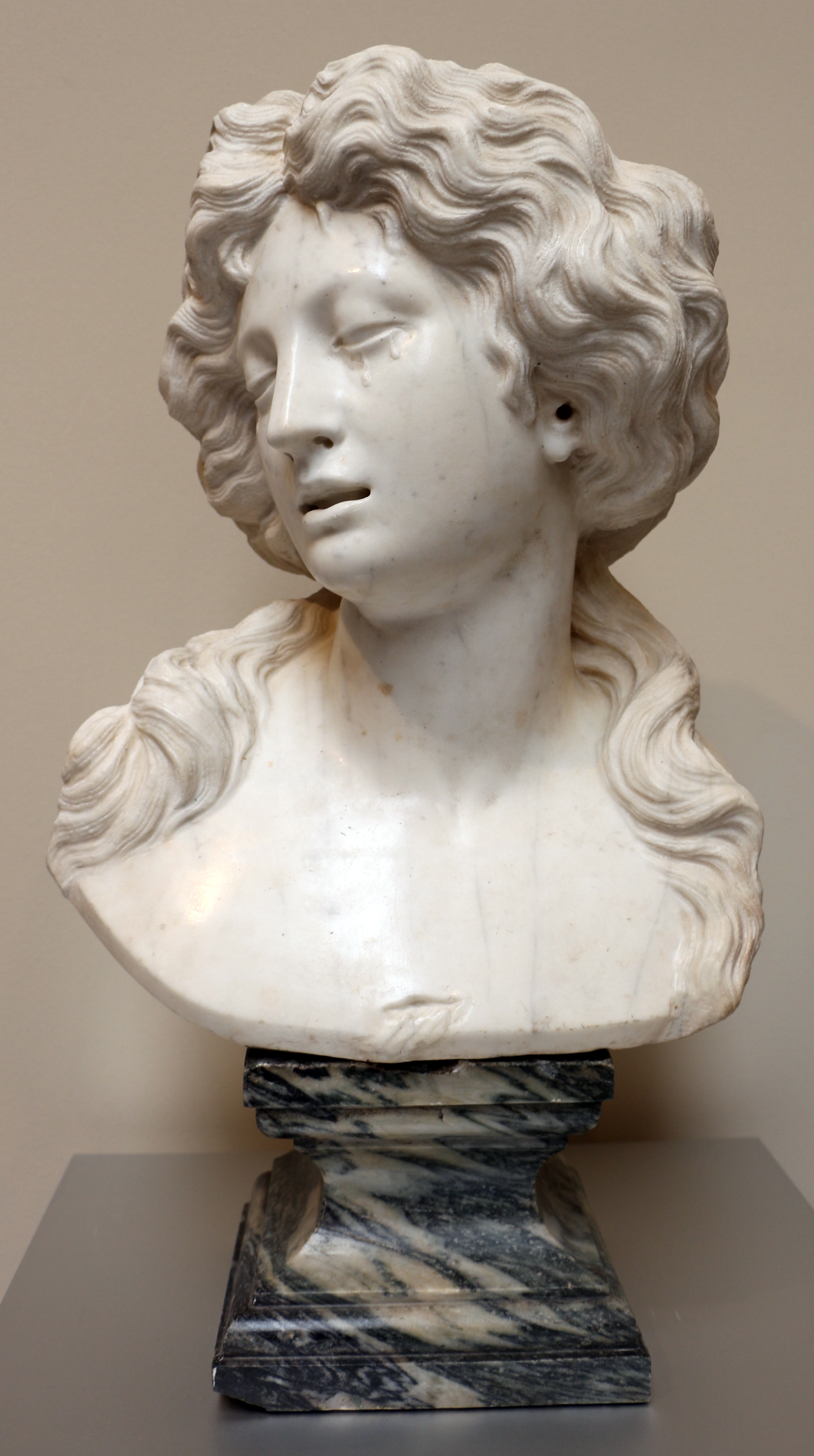
Lucrezia, Galleria of the Accademia Carrara, Bergamo

== Sources ==
- De Vincenti, Monica (2008). "MARINALI, Orazio". Dizionario Biografico degli Italiani (in Italian). Vol. 70: Marcora–Marsilio. Rome: Istituto dell'Enciclopedia Italiana. ISBN 978-88-12-00032-6.
- Bruce Boucher (1998). Thames & Hudson, World of Art (ed.). Italian Baroque Sculpture. pp. 84 and 103–4.
