= Villa La Pietra =

Villa in Tuscany, Italy

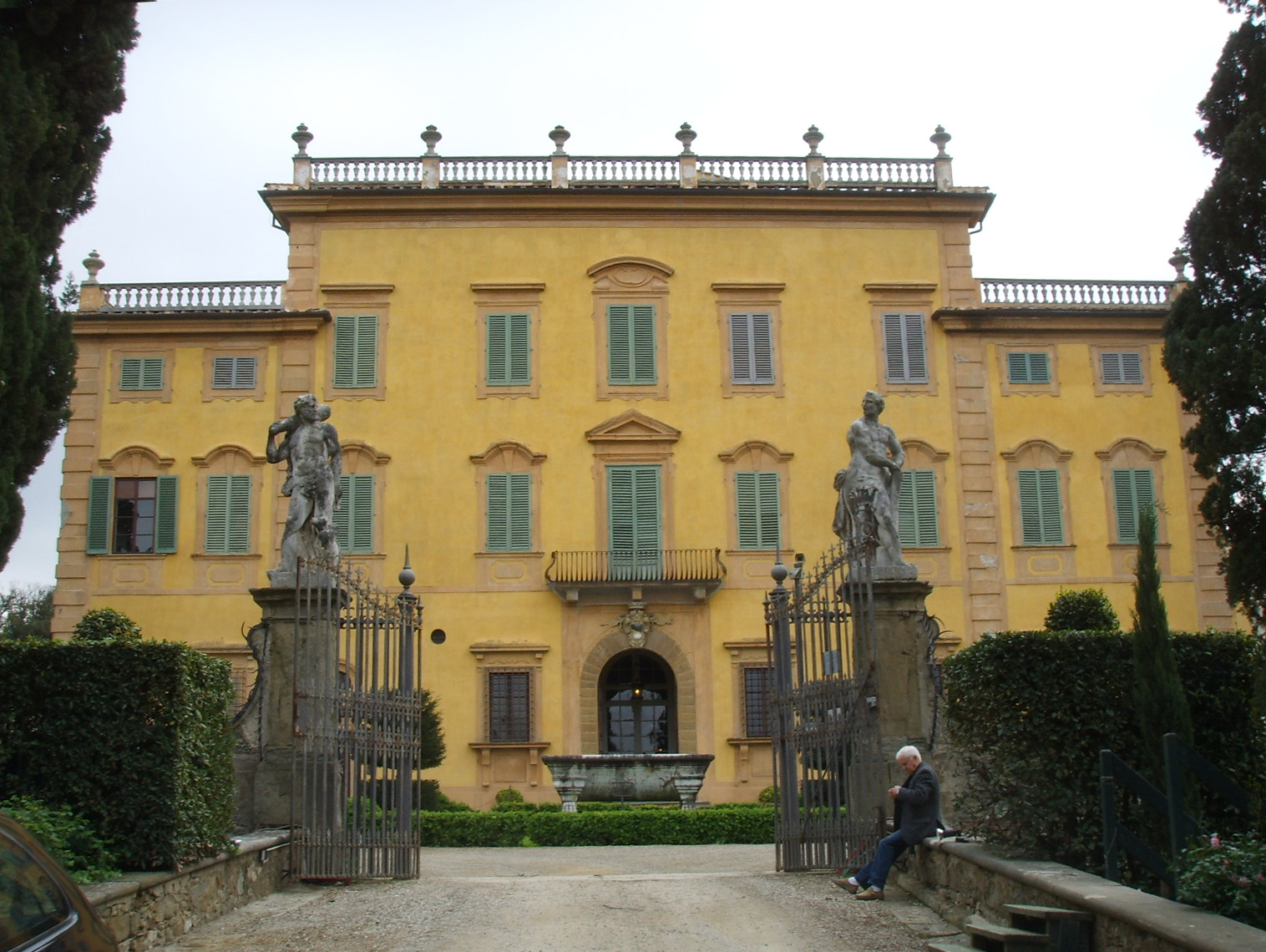
- The Baroque façade of the villa
- Interactive map of the Villa La Pietra area

General information
- Architectural style: Renaissance
- Location: via Bolognese 120, Florence, Italy
- Coordinates: 43°47′45″N 11°15′58″E
- Owner: New York University

Website
- lapietra.nyu.edu

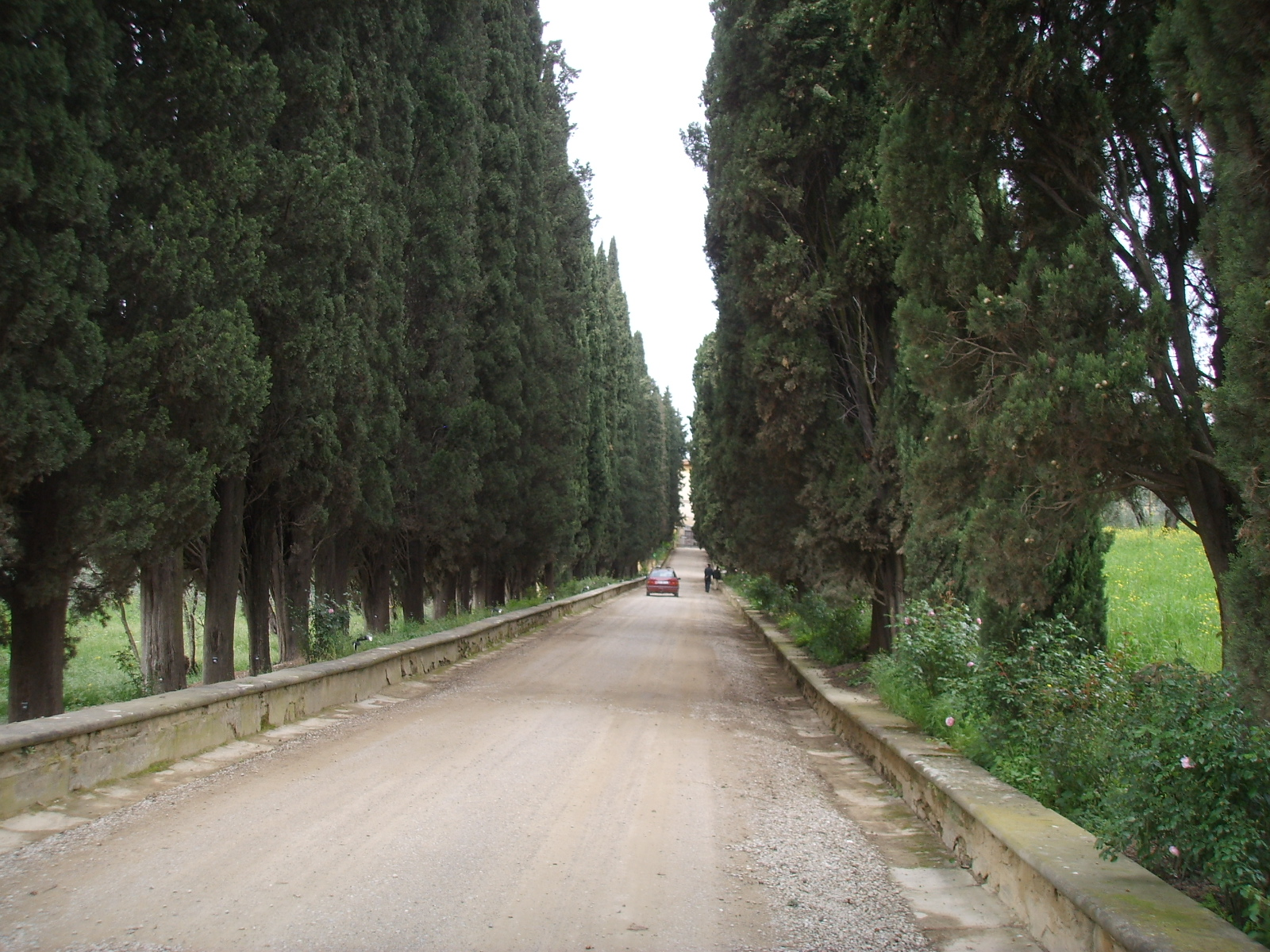
The cypress avenue leading to the villa

Villa La Pietra is a renaissance villa in the hills outside Florence, in Tuscany, central Italy. It was formerly the home of Arthur Acton (1873–1953) and later of his son Harold Acton, on whose death in 1994 it was bequeathed to New York University. The villa is now home to NYU Florence.

== History ==
Villa La Pietra was bought and somewhat modified in the 1460s by the Florentine banker Francesco Sassetti. In 1545 or 1546, it was sold to the Capponi family. The villa was given its present form in the seventeenth century by the cardinal Luigi Capponi, possibly with the assistance of Carlo Fontana. During the brief period from 1865 to 1871 when Florence was capital of the Kingdom of Italy, the villa was used as the embassy of Prussia.

In 1903, Arthur Acton, an Anglo-Neapolitan art dealer, rented it after his marriage to Hortense Mitchell, the daughter of John J. Mitchell, a banker from Chicago, Illinois, United States. With money from her family, the couple bought the villa in 1907.

The villa contains the art collection assembled by the Actons, which reflects twentieth-century Anglo-American taste. It is used for didactic purposes by New York University. The collection includes works from the circle of Giotto, Romanesque sculptures, a relief of the Virgin and Child by Donatello, and fifteenth-century tapestries made for the de' Medici family.

Between 1905 and 1930, the gardens of the villa were substantially altered by the Actons, only the walled lemon garden to the north-west of the villa remaining mostly unchanged since the time of Luigi Capponi. The Actons laid out a formal Baroque Italian garden with extensive stonework, including almost two hundred statues, many of them by the Venetian sculptors Orazio Marinali and Antonio Bonazza, brought to Florence from the villas of the Brenta. The gardens were restored in the early years of the twenty-first century.
