= Domenico Aglio =

Italian sculptor

Domenico Aglio (active 1710) was an Italian sculptor of the Baroque style, active in Verona.

He is also referred to as dell'Allio or de Aglio or il Gobbo (Hunchback). He was born in Vicenza. he was a pupil of the brothers, Angelo and Orazio Marinali. He carved a marble crucifix for Santa Maria dell Disciplina, and Busts of Onofrio Panvinio and Noris and others. He was active till about 1730.
