= Israel Miller =

New York-based shoe manufacturer, importer and banker

- Born: 1866; Grodno, Poland
- Died: August 13, 1929 (aged 63); Paris, France
- Resting place: Union Field Cemetery, New York City, U.S.
- Occupations: Shoe manufacturer, importer, designer, businessman
- Known for: Founder of I. Miller & Co.

Israel Miller (1866 – August 13, 1929) was a shoe manufacturer and merchant based in New York. His company I. Miller was the leading importer and maker of women's stilettos in the United States, with 200 retail locations around the country carrying a variety of designers. Miller was also a founder and director of the Broadway National Bank of New York.

== Life and career ==
Miller was born the son of a peasant shoemaker in Grodno, Poland in 1866. He was trained by his father as an expert craftsman. After four years in Paris as a cutter and designer, Miller emigrated to New York in 1892. He got a job at a cobbler's bench in Manhattan's Union Square with John Azzimonti, who was then the top producer of shoes for theatrical productions.

Following a brief partnership with a man who solicited orders for custom shoes, Miller established his own company, I. Miller & Co., in 1885. His shop had the moniker: The Show Folks Shoe Shop Dedicated to Beauty in Footwear. Initially, Miller produced shoes primarily for the theater industry. Numerous vaudevillians began to patronize him because of his exceptional designs and craftsmanship, and he soon started getting orders to supply shoes for whole casts of theatrical shows. Among his famous clients were Richard Mansfield, E. H. Sothern, Lillian Russell, Fannie Davenport, and Charles Bigelow. I. Miller made the shoes for nearly all of The Passing Show productions.

In 1905, Miller began a regular wholesale and retail business after he received commissions from society women requesting evening footwear, and actresses also wanted him to design shoes for their wardrobes. As Miller's business expanded, he built factories in Brooklyn, New York; Long Island, New York; and Haverhill, Massachusetts. The company name I. Miller was used for his flagship store at 1554 Broadway in the Theater District of Midtown Manhattan in New York City, which opened in 1911. Within the decade, when shorter dresses became fashionable, women's shoes suddenly gained popularity, and I. Miller & Sons, as it was then known, saw a dramatic increase in sales and profits.

Miller also imported shoes made by designer Andre Perugia from France, which were offered for sale in a special area known as the "Corner of Paris." Because women's stockings had historically been white, black, or dark brown, Miller also marketed Perugia's "sun tan" stockings, which were regarded as innovative.

Miller negotiated a new long-term lease in 1920 that would take over the entire 1554 Broadway building and the adjacent 1552 Broadway building, which had frontages on Broadway and West 46th Street, in effect from May 1926. Miller had architect Louis H. Friedman submit plans in March 1926 to join and redesign the structure, resulting in the I. Miller Building on Broadway and 46th Street. Beginning in May 1926, the project was finished by December.

In 1926, Miller retired from his role as head of I. Miller & Sons, an $8 million company that included two shoe manufacturers, 200 agencies around the United States, and sixteen retail stores in New York. His sons, who were inducted into the business as they grew up, continued to run the business.

Miller was a founder and director of the Broadway National Bank of New York.

Miller lived in Long Beach, New York, and was well-known for his charitable contributions. He made significant donations to the Jewish Educational Alliance, the Federation for the Support of Jewish Philanthropic Societies, and Beth Israel Hospital.

== Death ==
On August 13, 1929, Miller died at the age of 63 from a heart attack at Hôtel Claridge in Paris during an extended European tour. He was survived by his wife, who was at his bedside at the time of his death, daughters Etta, Mae and Rose, and sons George, Michael, Maurice and Irving. All of his sons stayed with the company, with George as president.

Miller's body was taken to New York on the North German Lloyd liner Bremen for burial. His funeral was held at the B'nai Jeshurun synagogue in Manhattan on August 21, 1929. All I. Miller shops were closed out of respect on the day of his funeral. About 2,000 people attended the funeral, including friends in the theater industry and delegations from Jewish institutions and organizations he supported. In his eulogy, Rabbi Israel Goldstein said Miller died like Moses, "upon a mountain." He is interred in the Miller family mausoleum at Union Field Cemetery in Ridgewood, Queens.
