= 1552 Broadway =

Building in Manhattan, New York

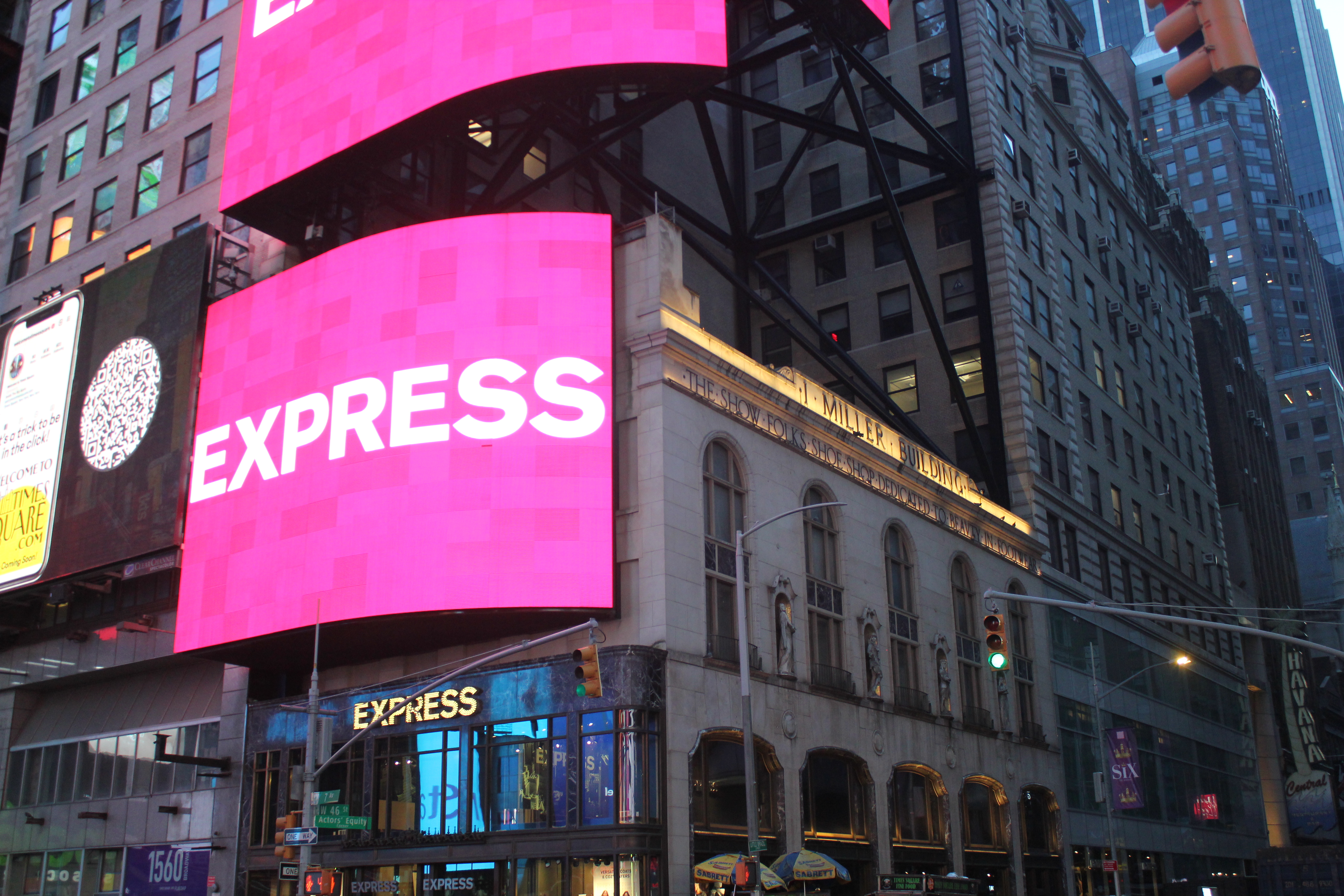
- Seen from the southwest
- Interactive map of the 1552 Broadway area
- Alternative names: I. Miller Building

General information
- Architectural style: Modern classical
- Location: Manhattan, New York, United States
- Coordinates: 40°45′31″N 73°59′05″W
- Construction started: May 1926
- Completed: December 1926
- Renovated: 2012–2014

Technical details
- Floor count: 3

Design and construction
- Architect: Louis H. Friedland

New York City Landmark
- Designated: June 29, 1999
- Reference no.: 2023

1552 Broadway, also known as the I. Miller Building, is a commercial structure on Times Square in the Theater District of Midtown Manhattan in New York City, New York, U.S. Located at the northeast corner of Broadway and 46th Street, the building was designed by Louis H. Friedland, with sculptures by Alexander Stirling Calder. The current building, designed for shoe retailer I. Miller, dates to 1926 and was combined from two 19th-century brownstone residences on the site. It contains decorative elements from several styles.

The building was designed with four stories, though the top story has been removed internally. The facade was designed in a different manner on Broadway and 46th Street. The Broadway elevation is designed with a storefront at the first two stories and billboards on the top two stories. The 46th Street elevation is divided into five vertical bays, with limestone on the two lowest stories and stucco above. Between the third-story windows on 46th Street are niches with statues of actresses Ethel Barrymore, Marilyn Miller, Mary Pickford, and Rosa Ponselle. There are billboards above the roof. Inside, the storefronts were subdivided into space for I. Miller and a retail tenant, while the upper stories contained I. Miller's offices.

Shoe designer Israel Miller had leased space at the previous brownstone at 1554 Broadway in the 1910s. He signed a long-term lease on the buildings in 1920 and, upon taking possession of the lease, remodeled the brownstones in 1926 with new facades by Louis H. Friedland. Miller also commissioned the actresses' sculptures from Calder, which were installed in 1929 shortly after Miller's death. The building remained an I. Miller store until the 1970s, after which the building was sold to investors. The New York City Landmarks Preservation Commission designated 1552 Broadway as a city landmark in 1999, and a TGI Fridays restaurant operated at 1552 Broadway in the early 21st century. The building was sold to SL Green and Wharton Acquisitions in 2011, and the new owners made extensive renovations from 2012 to 2014, converting the building to part of an Express, Inc. store and removing the fourth floor.

== Site ==
The I. Miller Building is at 1552 Broadway, at the northeast corner with 46th Street, along Times Square in the Midtown Manhattan neighborhood of New York City, New York, U.S. While the building carries a Broadway address, it is actually on the east side of Seventh Avenue, (Note: As the two roads intersect at a very shallow angle, they are nearly parallel through Times Square. Broadway is west of Seventh Avenue to the north of 45th Street and east of Seventh Avenue to the south of 44th Street. Because Broadway between 42nd and 47th Streets was closed in the 2010s, the I. Miller Building only faces Seventh Avenue.) as the adjoining section of Broadway was converted into a permanent pedestrian plaza in the 2010s. The rectangular land lot covers 3,234 square feet (300.4 m^{2}), with a frontage of 40 feet (12 m) on Times Square and 80 feet (24 m) along 46th Street. 1552 Broadway faces Duffy Square directly to the west.

The current building was adapted from a pair of four-story brownstone tenements at 1552 and 1554 Broadway. The surrounding area is part of Manhattan's Theater District and contains many Broadway theatres. The building is surrounded to the north and east by the Actors Equity Building at 1560 Broadway. Immediately to the north are TSX Broadway at 1568 Broadway, containing the Palace Theatre, as well as the Embassy Theatre within 1560 Broadway. Other nearby buildings include the Church of St. Mary the Virgin to the east; 1540 Broadway and the Lyceum Theatre to the south; the New York Marriott Marquis to the southwest; the Lunt-Fontanne Theatre and Hotel Edison to the west; and the Morgan Stanley Building to the northwest.

== Architecture ==
The I. Miller Building at 1552 Broadway was designed by Louis H. Friedland as a shoe store for Israel Miller. It was adapted in 1926 from the two existing brownstone residences on the site. The building contains four statues sculpted by Alexander Stirling Calder. The facade consists of a base with two stories and an upper section that was originally two stories. Both the western elevation on Times Square and the southern elevation on 46th Street are designed with modern classical features. Friedland designed the two elevations in different styles, since they would be seen from different viewpoints. The modern building has three stories inside and is connected internally to 1560 Broadway.

=== Facade ===
==== Broadway ====
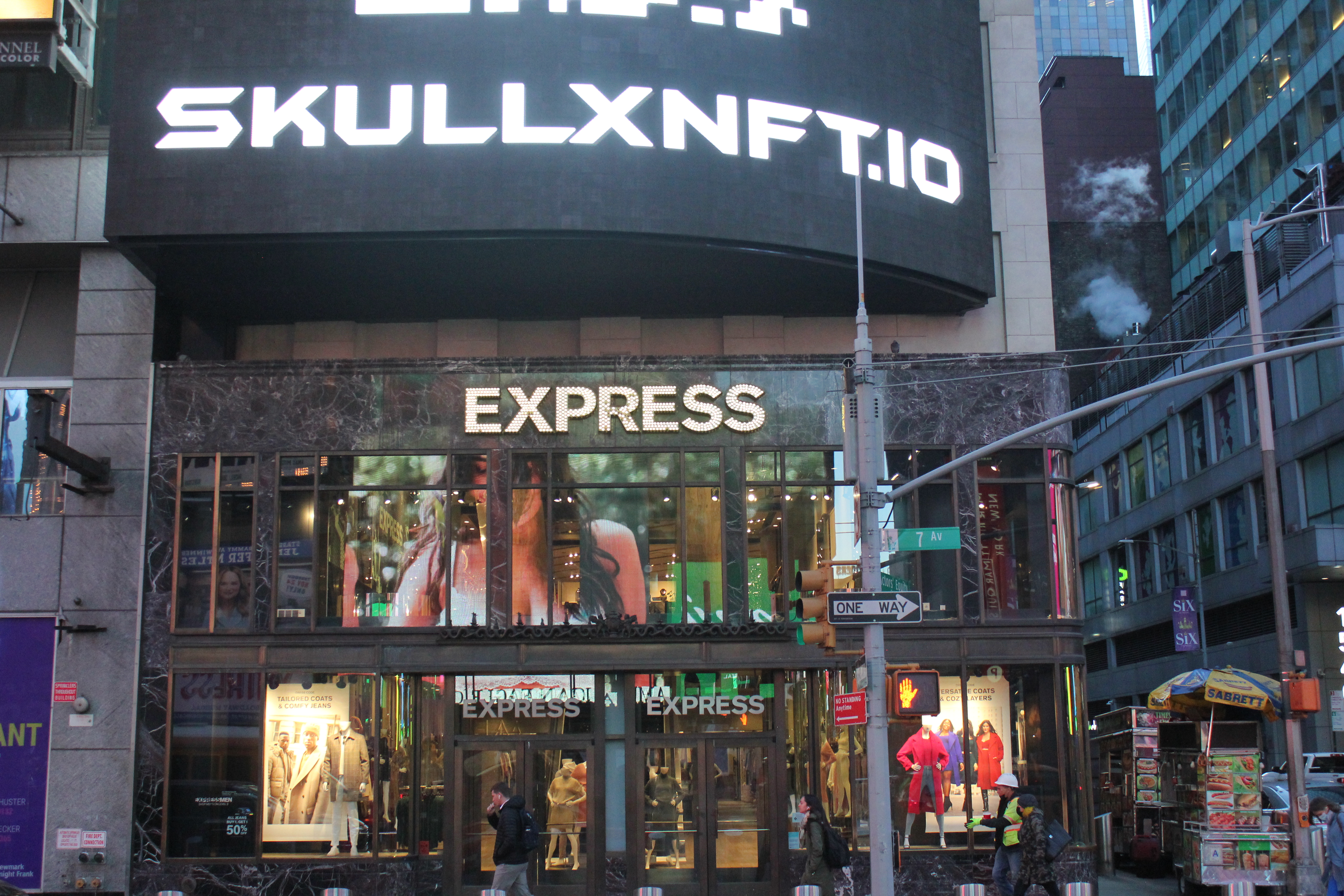
Broadway facade

The Broadway elevation was designed with a storefront containing curved corners at the first two stories. There were originally two storefronts; the southern storefront was taken by the I. Miller store, while the northern storefront was rented out. At the time, it was becoming common practice in New York City to build arcaded storefronts, with the store entrances recessed behind display windows. By the late 1990s, the northern storefront's arcaded entrance remained, but the southern storefront had been modified with orange marble. The second story had been covered with a curved sign that wrapped around to 46th Street. The original storefront was restored in a 2014 renovation.

Initially, the Broadway elevation contained a group of signs totaling 3,500 square feet (330 m^{2}). A slightly angled sign, which was in place by the 1920s, covered what was originally the top two stories. The original brownstone on 1552 Broadway was refaced in granite, but 1554 Broadway's brownstone facade was not modified. Friedland had originally planned for the top floors to be clad in stucco, with rectangular window openings on the third story. The fourth-floor windows would have been blocked up so an oval sign with I. Miller's name would be placed there. This did not happen because there was a billboard on the existing third and fourth stories, and Miller either could not or would not break the billboard's lease. As of 2014, the top stories contain 8,500 square feet (790 m^{2}) of electronic signs, including a 150-foot-tall (46 m) LED sign on the store's roof.

==== 46th Street ====
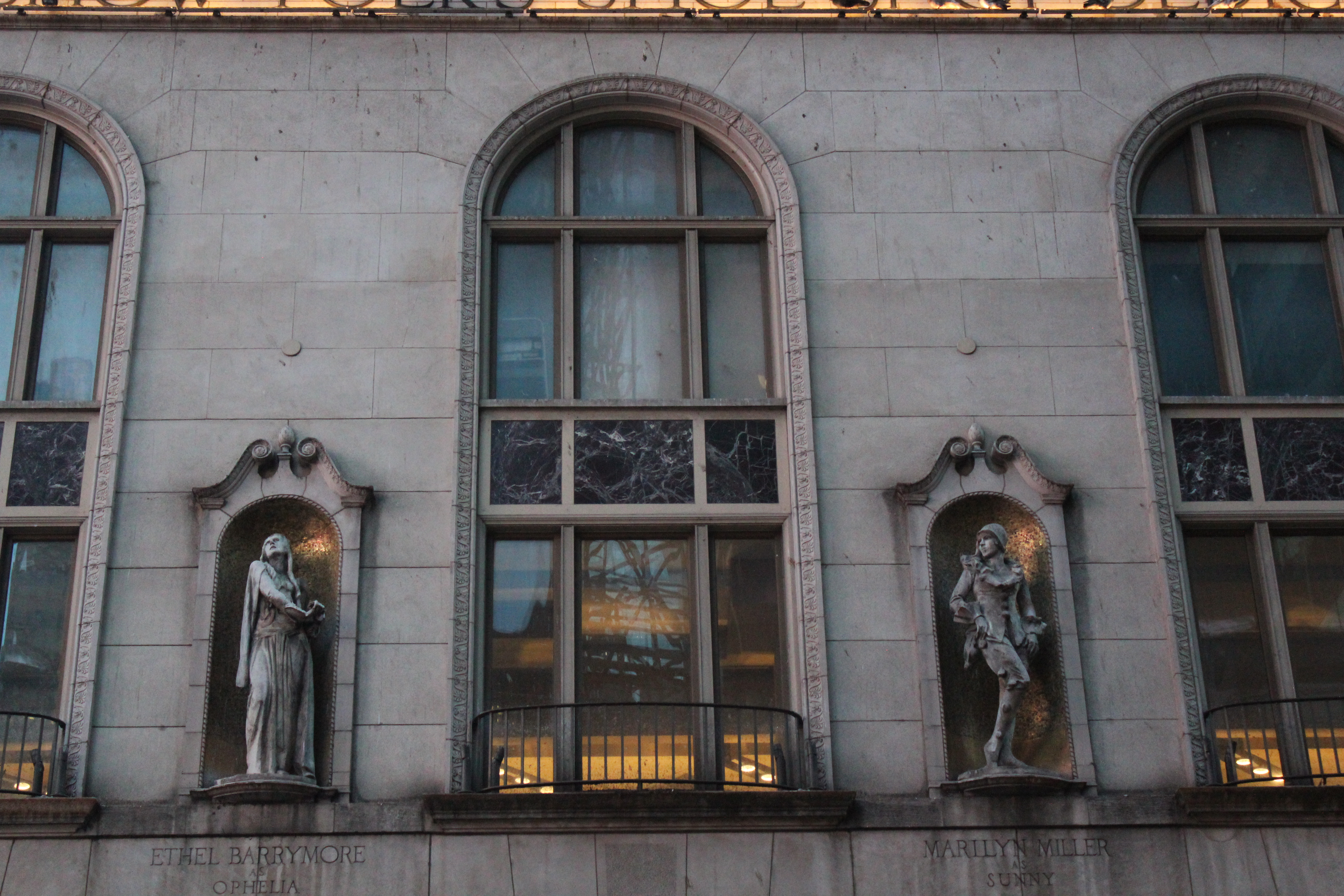
Detail of the second bay from west, flanked by the Ethel Barrymore and Marilyn Miller niches

The 46th Street elevation is divided into five vertical bays, with limestone on the two lowest stories and stucco above. On the first two stories, the bays are divided by piers with granite footings, and each bay has segmental arches with gray marble frames. The arches were inspired by the French rococo style. By the late 1990s, the westernmost bay was hidden by a marble storefront and sign, while the easternmost bay had aluminum ventilation grilles rather than windows. In the other bays, the first story had orange-marble bulkheads and spandrels, with metal-and-glass windows. The second story has tripartite windows, with two narrow panes flanking a wider pane, which largely dates from the building's 1926 conversion. All five bays were restored to their original design in 2014, with dark-marble bulkheads and spandrels at the first story and tripartite windows in the second story.

The third and original fourth stories contain double-height arches, surrounded by terracotta frames with anthemia. Each arch is divided vertically into three panels, with dark marble spandrels separating the two formerly separate stories. Wrought-iron balconies are placed in front of the third-story windows. The five bays flank a group of four niches, each with a statue of an actress, carved by Calder. The statues, from west to east, depict Ethel Barrymore (in character as Ophelia), Marilyn Miller (Sunny), Mary Pickford (Little Lord Fauntleroy), and Rosa Ponselle (Norma). (Note: The Ethel Barrymore niche depicts drama; the Marilyn Miller niche depicts musical comedy; the Mary Pickford niche depicts film; and the Rosa Ponselle niche depicts opera.) Inscriptions to this effect are placed beneath each niche. The niches have terracotta frames and are lined with gold-mosaic tiles; they contain curved pediments at their tops.

The 46th Street elevation contains an entablature, with a frieze and terracotta cornice, above the former fourth story. There is an inscription on the frieze, which reads: "The Show Folks Shoe Shop Dedicated to Beauty in Footwear". The parapet has a plaque with the letters "I. Miller Building". The original letters were removed in the 1990s, but the lettering was restored during the 2014 renovation. The plaque is flanked by terracotta scrolls and topped by a terracotta coping. The building has a flat roof, above which rise the billboards.

=== Interior ===
The building covers 12,343 square feet (1,146.7 m^{2}) according to the New York City Department of City Planning, or 12,091 square feet (1,123.3 m^{2}) according to Real Estate Weekly. Initially, the building had two storefronts, one each at number 1552 (south) and 1554 (north). There were four stories, with the upper stories used as offices. As of 2014, it contains a single storefront across three stories and is internally connected with 1560 Broadway to the north and east. The space is entirely occupied by an Express, Inc. store, covering 22,500 square feet (2,090 m^{2}).

== History ==
The site of the current I. Miller Building was occupied by residential brownstones in the 19th century. It is unknown exactly when the predecessor buildings at 1552 and 1554 Broadway were erected, but historian Christopher Gray estimated that they dated from between 1870 and 1890. Both buildings had originally contained stoops when they were used as residences, but the stoops had been removed by the 1910s when the buildings were converted to commercial use. Additionally, billboards had been erected over the top stories of both buildings. The current building was the result of renovations for Israel Miller (1866–1929), a Polish-born shoe designer who came to New York City in the 1890s. Miller had leased the ground-story space of the original brownstone at 1554 Broadway, the site of his first shoe store, in 1911 or 1915. Miller remodeled the buildings in 1915.

=== Development and early years ===
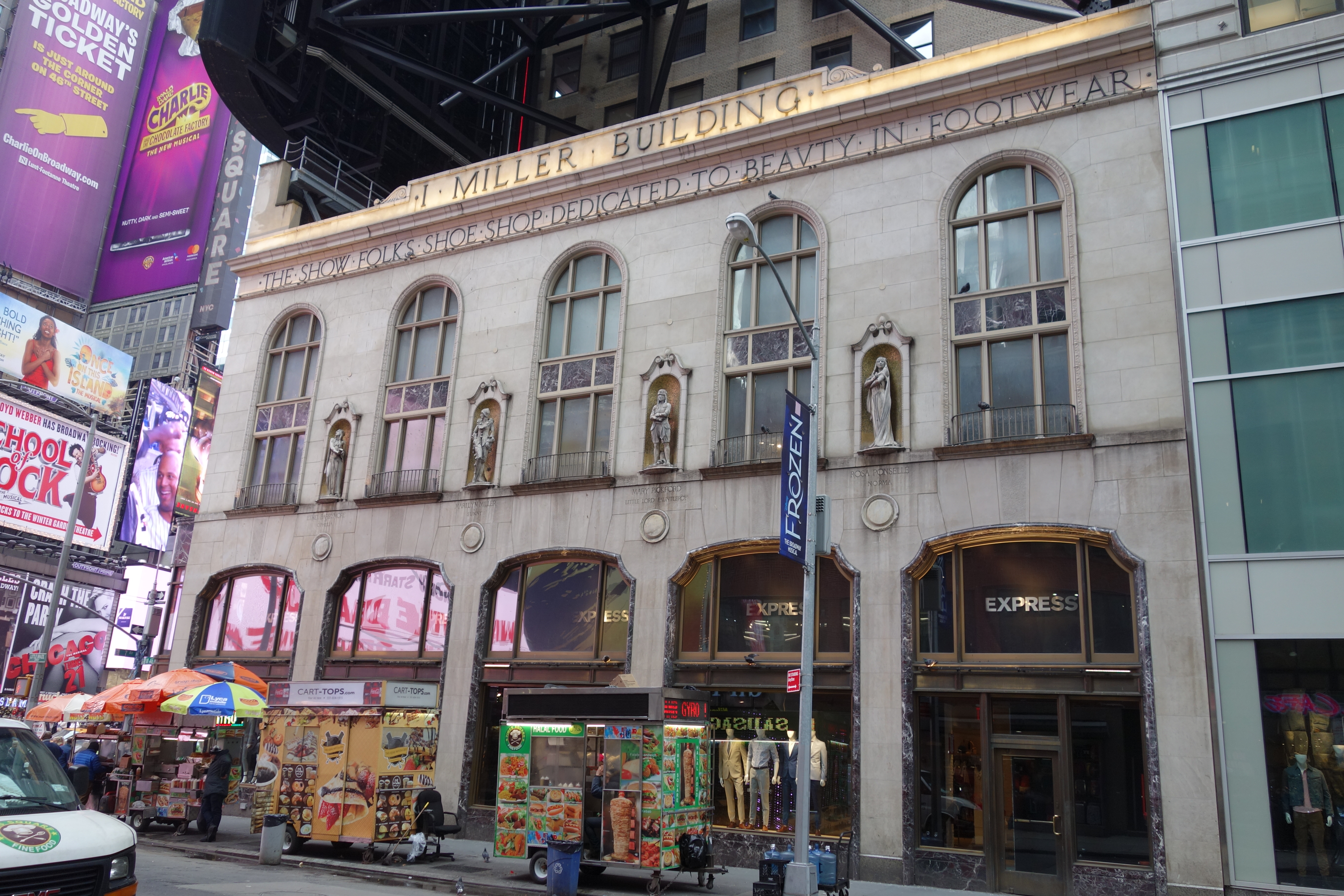
View from 46th Street

In December 1920, Miller signed a 63-year lease for 1552 and 1554 Broadway for $4.636 million (equivalent to $74.507 million in 2025). After the lease commenced in May 1926, Miller would have the option to buy the property for $1 million in cash (around $16 million in 2025), which would be valid for five years. Miller hired Friedland in March 1926, just before Miller was to take control of the buildings, and Friedland filed plans to remodel both structures. The work took place from May to December 1926, though the store seems to have reopened that November. The party wall between the buildings was demolished and new columns and beams were installed. In addition, the stairs were replaced, an elevator was installed, and the two-story rear sections of both buildings was increased to four stories.

Miller planned to put four statues in the niches on 46th Street as a gift to New York City. The I. Miller chain held a nationwide contest to determine the most popular actress in each of drama, film, musical comedy, and opera. In September 1927, Ethel Barrymore, Mary Pickford, Marilyn Miller, and Rosa Ponselle were declared the winners. Alexander Calder was hired for the project. The first of the new statues, that of Barrymore, was completed in 1928. (Note: Variety cites the Barrymore statue as having been completed in January 1928, while Women's Wear Daily cites the statue as having been completed in November.) Miller died in August 1929, just before the statues were unveiled. Two months later, on October 20, the statues were unveiled at a ceremony. Three thousand guests were in attendance, including Miller, Ponselle, producer Daniel Frohman, comedian DeWolf Hopper, and actress Elsie Ferguson.

=== Mid- and late 20th century ===
Initially, the building had two storefronts. The southern storefront was used by I. Miller and the northern storefront and the basement hosted a dress shop and a jewelry store. The dress shop space was operated by Michelson Inc. starting in January 1927. The upper floors of the combined structure were used as I. Miller's offices. I. Miller initially kept many offices at the nearby 562 Fifth Avenue building but, with the onset of the Great Depression, these offices were combined at 1552 Broadway. In 1931, the wholesale department was relocated from I. Miller's Broadway location to a warehouse in Long Island City. Meanwhile, Israel Miller's sons George and Maurice had taken over the I. Miller company after their father died. In 1939, Hollywood Linen Company leased the south storefront and Arnel Jewelers leased the north storefront.

The owners announced in 1940 that they would build a $800,000 advertising board (equivalent to $18.385 million in 2025), comprising two panels facing Broadway and another on the roof of the building. The new billboard used 100 miles (160 km) of wire, according to media of the time; it was originally used to advertise whiskey. Afterward, the Miller sons relocated the company's executive retail offices from the I. Miller Building to 450 Fifth Avenue, and jeweler Adele Inc. had space at the storefront in number 1554 during the mid-1940s. The I. Miller shoe chain was acquired by Genesco in the 1950s. A nine-story, 6,500-bulb sign was installed above the roof in 1957, advertising several of Time Life's magazines. When a five-alarm fire broke out in 1959 at the Howard Johnson's restaurant inside number 1554, firefighters had difficulty extinguishing the conflagration due to the presence of the rooftop billboards. In the fire's aftermath, the New York City fire commissioner contemplated legislation to restrict billboards on Times Square.

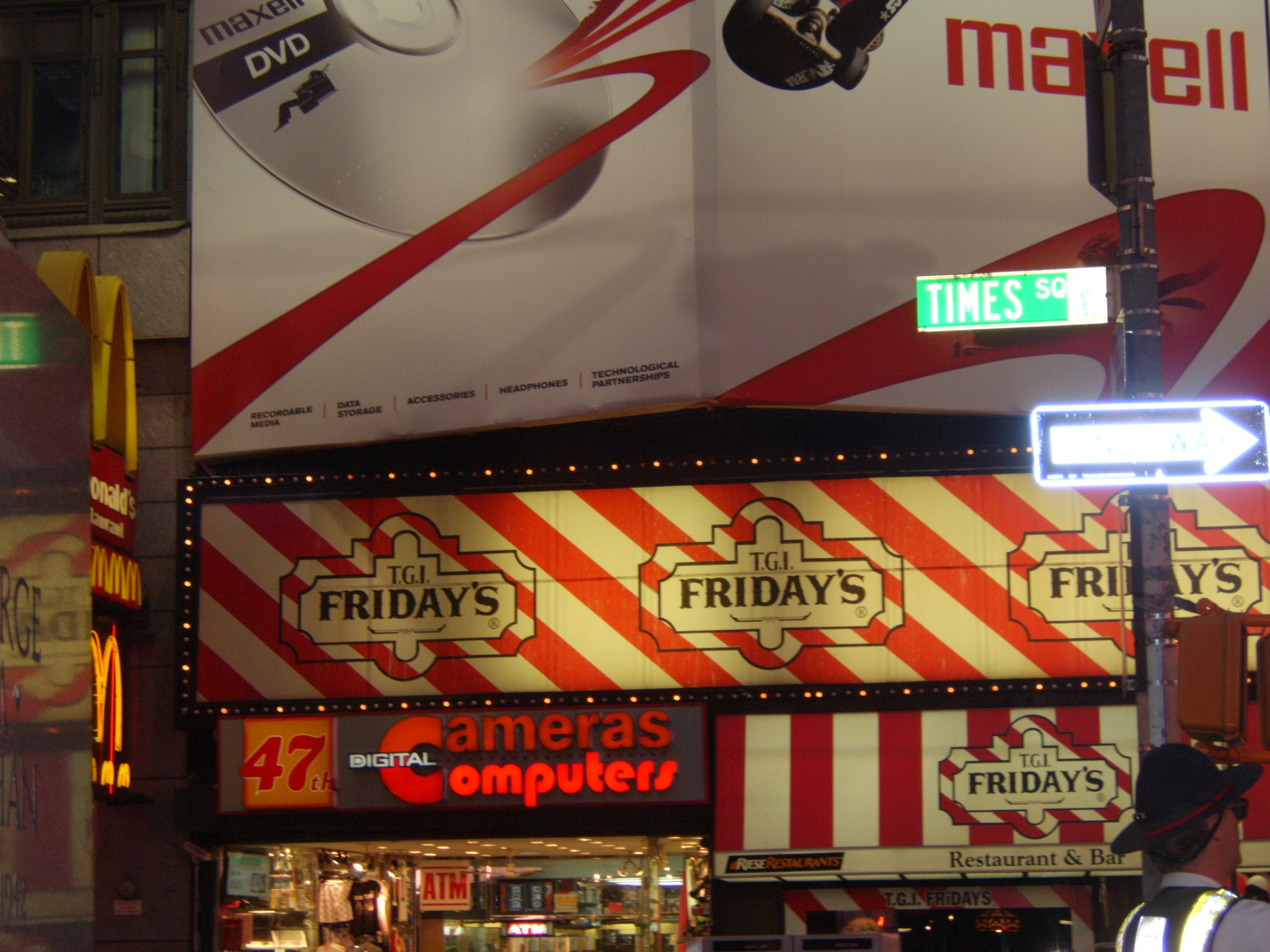
TGI Fridays at the base

Genesco extended the lease for 21 years in 1967, and the company continued to operate the building's I. Miller store until at least 1972. By then, Times Square was in decline, though the city government was considering redeveloping the area. One reporter described the store as being in a "vulnerable" position because of this. The Riese family then acquired the lease on the property, as well as the building itself, in 1983. (Note: Landmarks Preservation Commission 1999, p. 5, cites a date of 1978, but the deed was not recorded until 1983.) The Rieses were restaurateurs who operated dozens of food franchises throughout Manhattan. In the late 1980s, the building was considered as a possible location for an Au Printemps department store. At the time, the Riese Organization operated a ground-level fast-food restaurant at the base. The New York City Landmarks Preservation Commission (LPC) was also considering the I. Miller Building for New York City landmark designation, having hosted its first hearing on the matter in 1985. The LPC again heard the building for landmark status in 1990 but did not designate the building at the time.

By the late 1990s, the building contained a Sbarro restaurant at the corner with 46th Street. The LPC designated the I. Miller Building as a landmark on June 30, 1999. David W. Dunlap wrote for The New York Times that the designation went against the trend of buildings on Times Square, which he said had "been chipped away piece by piece in recent years until very little remains of what was once a splendidly pungent esthetic amalgam". A TGI Fridays was proposed for the building that year. However, Riese was in debt by then, and it agreed to sell 1552 Broadway and another structure at 729 Seventh Avenue that year. The buyer, NorthStar, then leased back the buildings to Riese Management.

=== 2000s to present ===
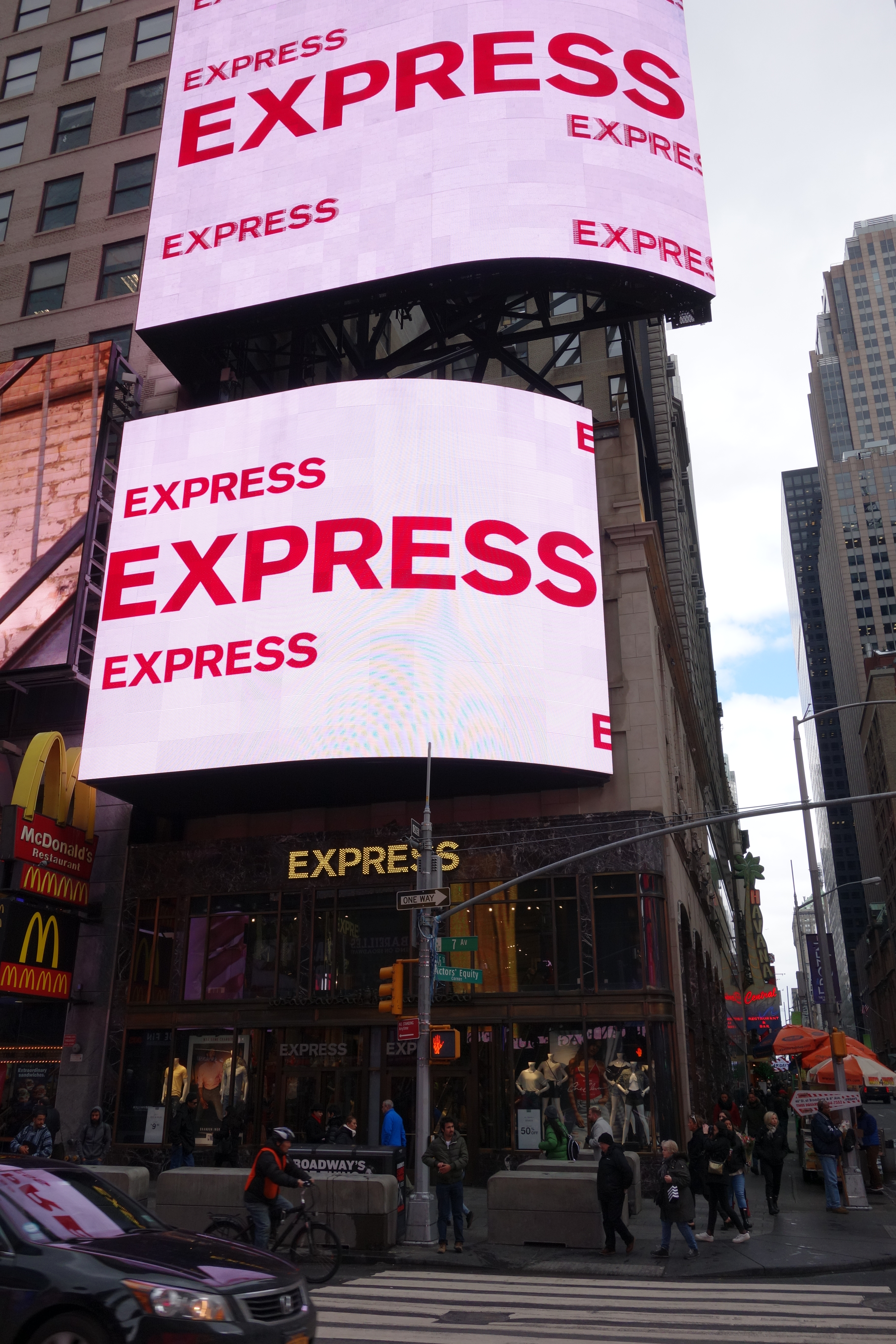
Billboards above the building

The building and eight others were refinanced for $43 million in 2003. NorthStar Realty sold the building in 2005 to Riese Management for $48 million, a rate of $3,970 per square foot ($42,700/m^{2}). By March 2011, Riese had placed the building for sale again, including the TGI Fridays restaurant at the base and the billboards above it. The building was sold that August to SL Green and Wharton Acquisitions for $136.6 million. The sale was valued at $9,100 per square foot ($98,000/m^{2}), much higher than the average rate of $1,000 per square foot ($11,000/m^{2}) for high-quality office buildings in New York City. The sale helped to clear the debt load of Riese, operator of the TGI Fridays. During TGI Fridays' occupancy, 1552 Broadway had become rundown and was indistinguishable from the other Times Square buildings with billboards.

TGI Fridays closed in early 2012, and clothing retailer Express signed a lease for the storefront that May. Rogers Marvel Architects was subsequently hired to restore the building. The statues in the niches were subsequently removed for restoration in 2012, and SNA replaced the existing signs with a group of seven screens. The facade was also restored. Since the landmark designation prevented SL Green and Wharton from adding stories to 1552 Broadway, they leased 1560 Broadway and 155 West 46th Street, connecting the buildings internally. This arrangement allowed the owners to triple the size of the retail space without actually expanding 1552 Broadway. The restoration of 1552 Broadway was completed in 2014, and the Express store soft-opened that February. The owners acquired a $195 million loan for 1552 and 1560 Broadway from United Overseas Bank in 2017. The Express store closed in 2024 after Express filed for bankruptcy.

== See also ==
- List of buildings and structures on Broadway in Manhattan
- List of New York City Designated Landmarks in Manhattan from 14th to 59th Streets
