= Francesco Zanella =

Italian painter

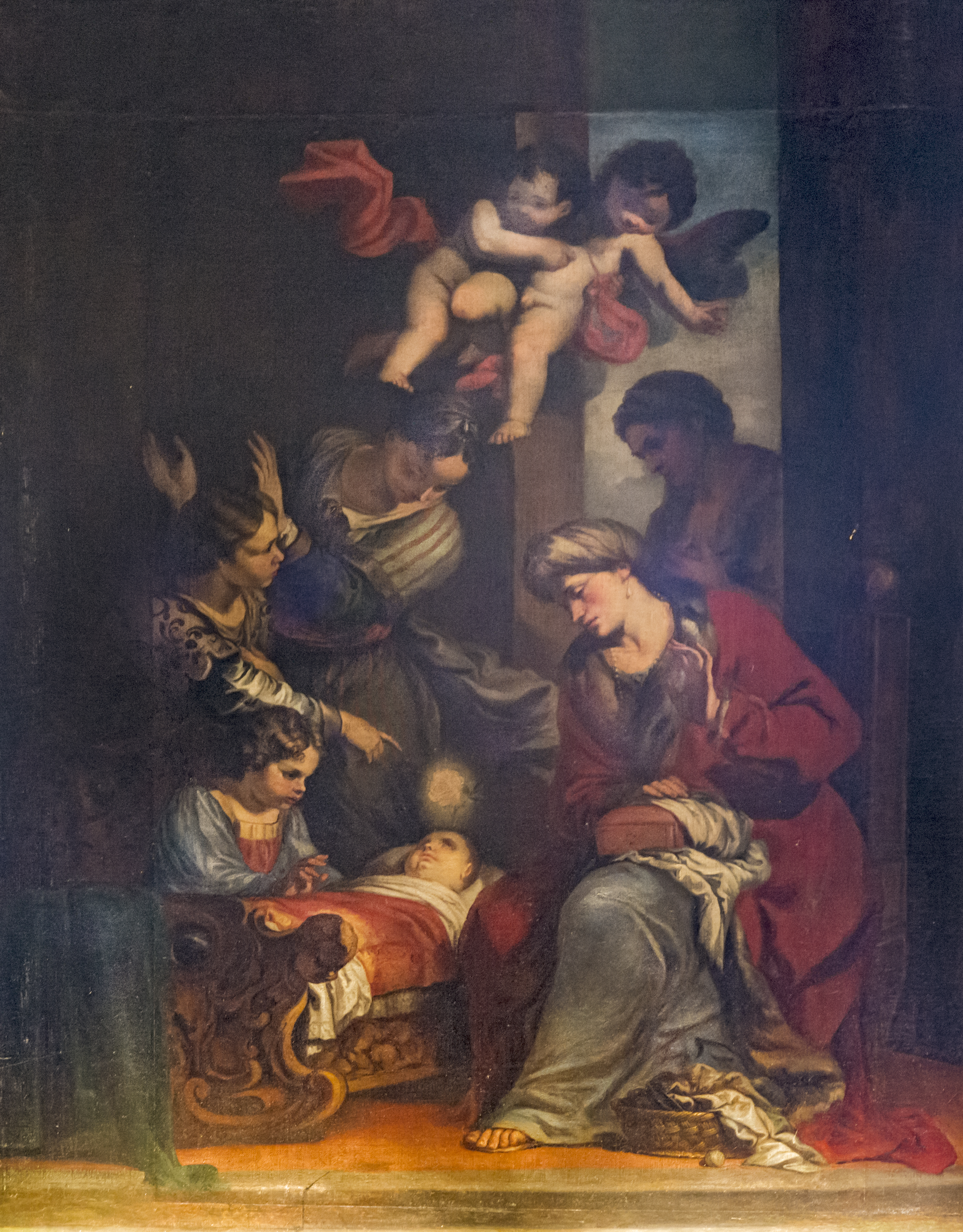
Birth of Santa Rosa da Lima at Santi Giovanni e Paolo, Venice

Francesco Zanella (1637 – 1717) was an Italian painter, active in Padua and painting in a Baroque style.

== Biography ==
He was born in Padua, and he putatively trained under Luca Ferrari in Padua. He was prolific, mainly painted sacred subjects in a late-Baroque style. Luigi Lanzi describes him as spirited, but not diligent or well studied, known as the Giordano of this city (Padua) due to the great number of paintings completed in a short time. His son Domenico was a mediocre painter.

He painted an altarpiece depicting the Encounter of St Anne and John the Baptist for the church of the Eremitani, Padua. He painted a Madonna with Saints Peter, Jerome, and other for the Paduan church of Santa Sofia. He also painted altarpieces for churches in Noale; the Sanctuary of the Madonna del Trestole (Saints Antony and Joseph); and for San Canziano in Padova (Immaculate Conception at the right of the altar).
