= Antonio Bonazza =

Italian sculptor

Antonio Bonazza (23 December 1698 – 12 January 1763) was an Italian sculptor of the Rococo. He is considered one the greatest and most original Venetian sculptors of the 18th century; his activity was widespread, and his art distinguished by its vivid and picturesque naturalism.

== Biography ==
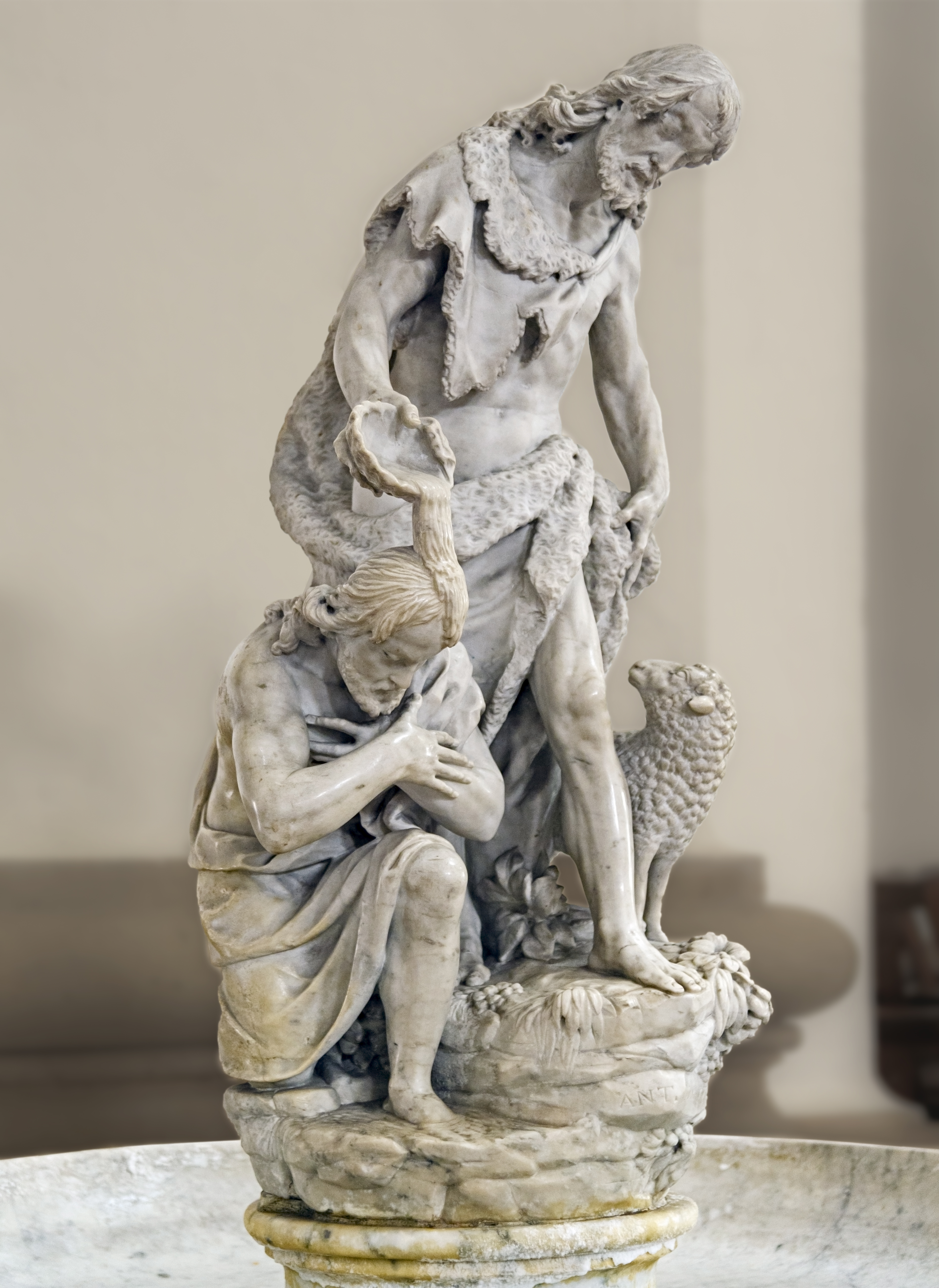
The baptism of Jesus Christ Padua Cathedral

=== Early career ===
Antonio was the son of Giovanni Bonazza, a prominent sculptor active in Padua (1654–1736), and member of a large family of sculptors. He may have been influenced by Orazio Marinali of Vicenza. He is first recorded working in collaboration with his father and brothers Tommaso and Francesco on the marble reliefs depicting the Adoration of the Shepherds (1730) and the Adoration of the Magi (1732) in the Cappella del Rosario of Santi Giovanni e Paolo, Venice, which are characterized by tender naturalistic detail. Later he produced the eight slightly rigid stucco Virtues (1741) in the Madonna Addolorata al Torresino, Padua, and the fourteen marble reliefs of the Stations of the Cross in the parish church at Cornegliana (Padua).

=== Mature works ===
In 1742 he created his masterpiece, a series of garden sculptures executed for the Villa Widmann at Bagnoli di Sopra. Here, alongside mythological figures, are a soldier, an oriental, a Moor, a huntsman, a peasant, a gentleman and gentlewoman, and a quarrelsome old man and woman, engaged in a witty comedy reminiscent of Carlo Goldoni’s contemporary plays; indeed Goldoni was a guest at the villa.

Bonazza was also a gifted portraitist, as demonstrated in the portraits in pietra tenera of Pope Benedict XIV and Cardinal Rezzonico (later Pope Clement XIII) (both 1746; Padua Cathedral) and the vivid portrait in marble of the doctor Alessandro Knips Macoppe (Universityo of Padua).

Antonio’s mature religious works tend to be more conventional. His many saints and angels include the marble figures of Saints Peter and Paul (1746) for the high altar of the parish church at Bagnoli di Sopra, the angels (1750s) for the church of San Tommaso dei Filippini, Padua, distinguished by their wonderfully rounded luminous surfaces, and the angels executed in a broader, freer style for the parish church at Valnogaredo. His works in low relief include the slightly heavy, yet atmospheric reliefs (1753–5) for the altar of the Sacrament in Montagnana Cathedral, showing the Sacrifice of Isaac, Elijah and the Angel and the Last Supper.

In 1757 he completed a further series of garden sculptures, of Flora, Pomona, Zephyrus and Vertumnus, for the Peterhof Garden at Saint Petersburg. Antonio is best known for his sculpture of genre themes, carved in local stone. His genre subjects may have influenced Franz Anton Bustelli’s porcelain figures produced at Nymphenburg porcelain factory.

== Gallery ==
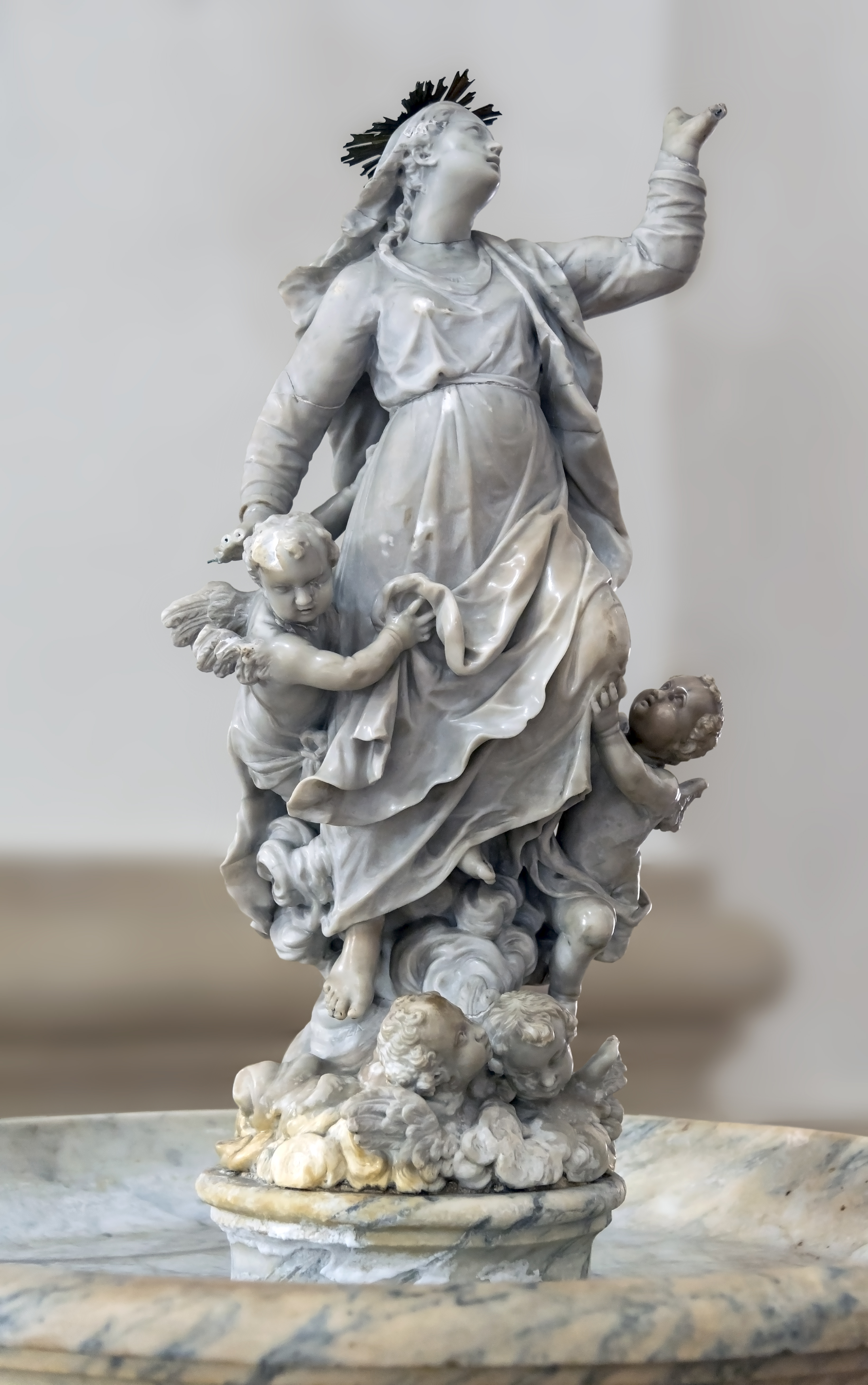
Statue of the Assumption, Padua Cathedral

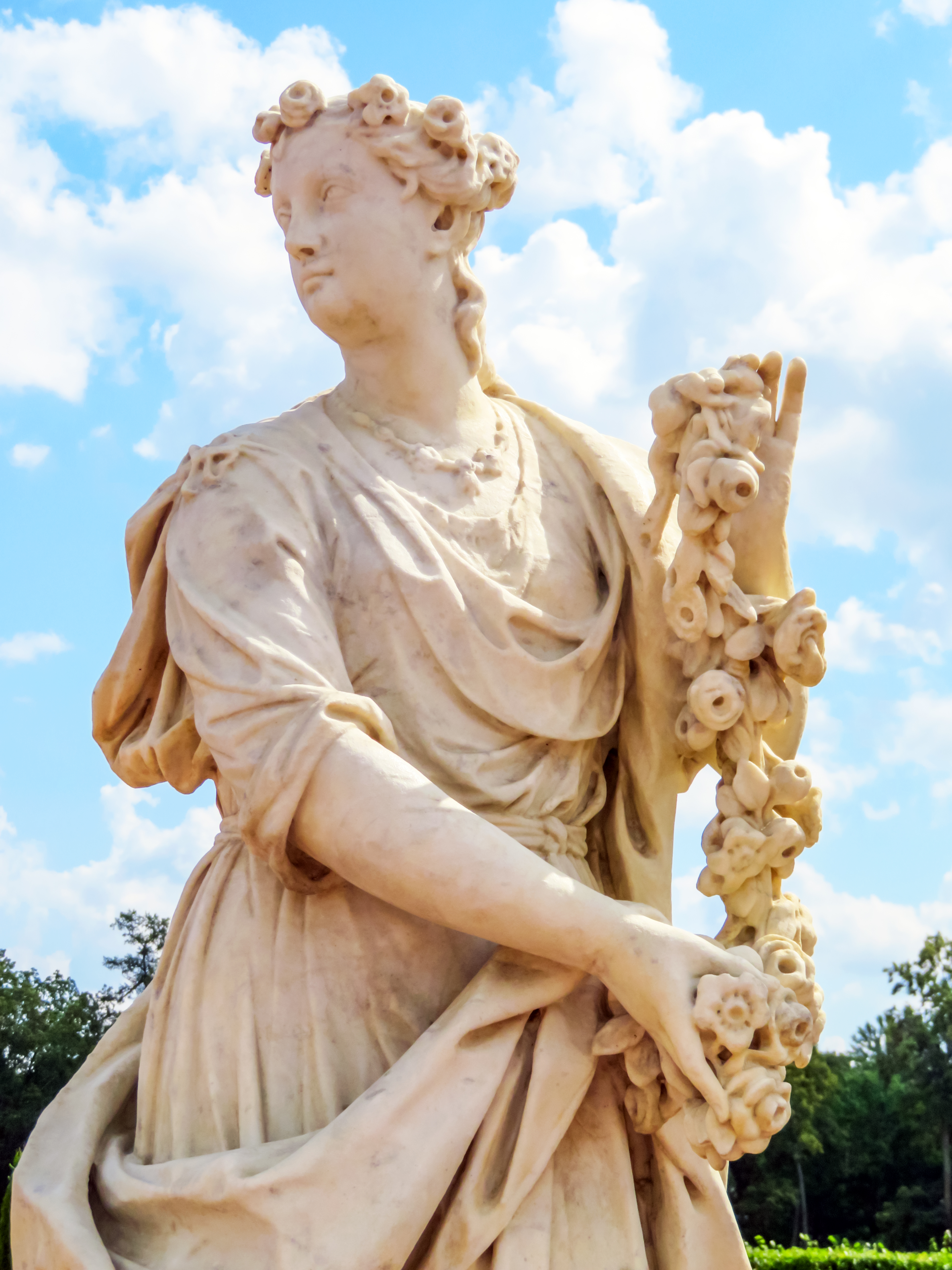
Flora statue (detail) in Upper Gardens of Peterhof, Saint Petersburg, Russia

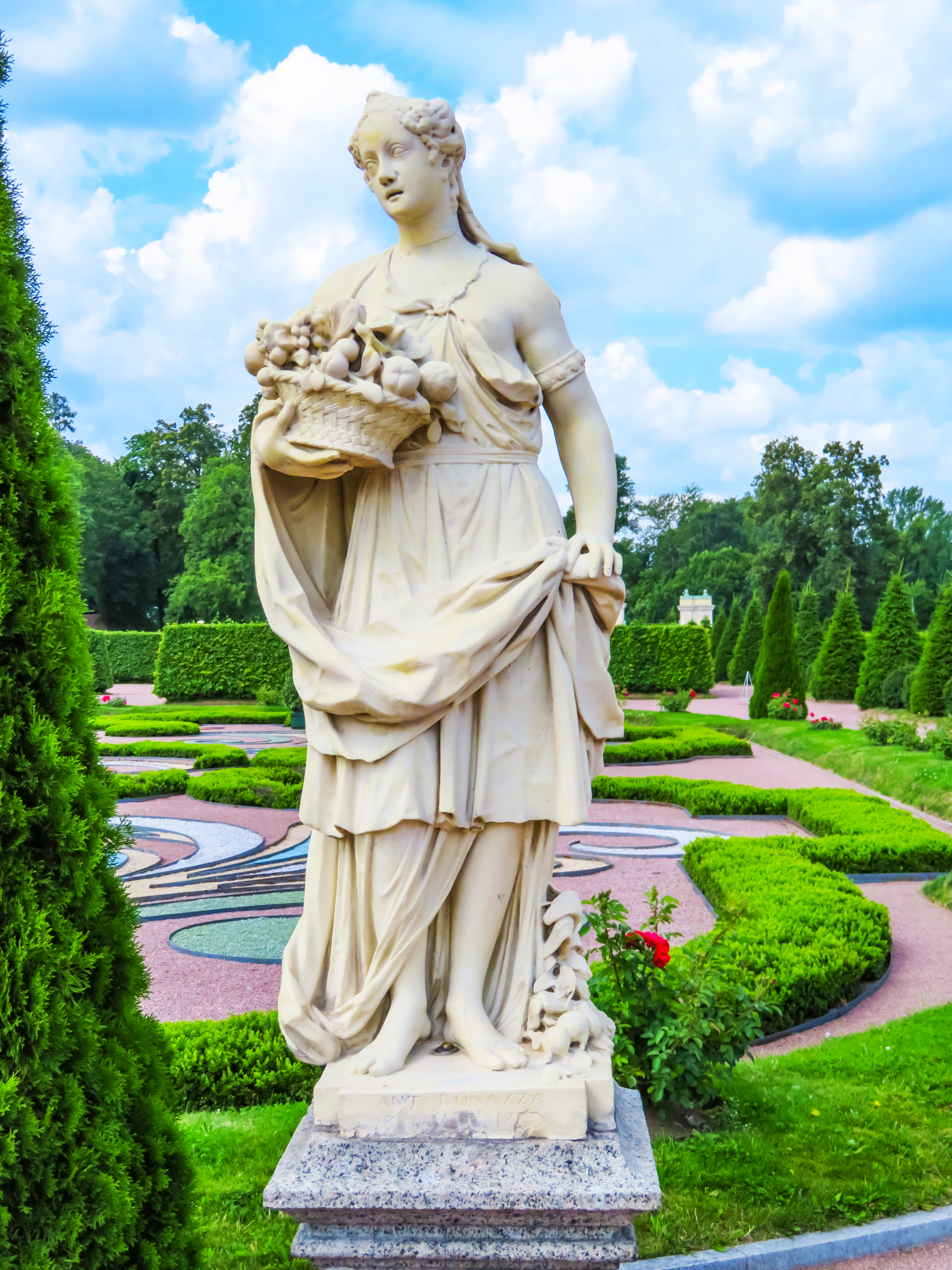
Pomona statue (detail) in Upper Gardens of Peterhof, Saint Petersburg, Russia

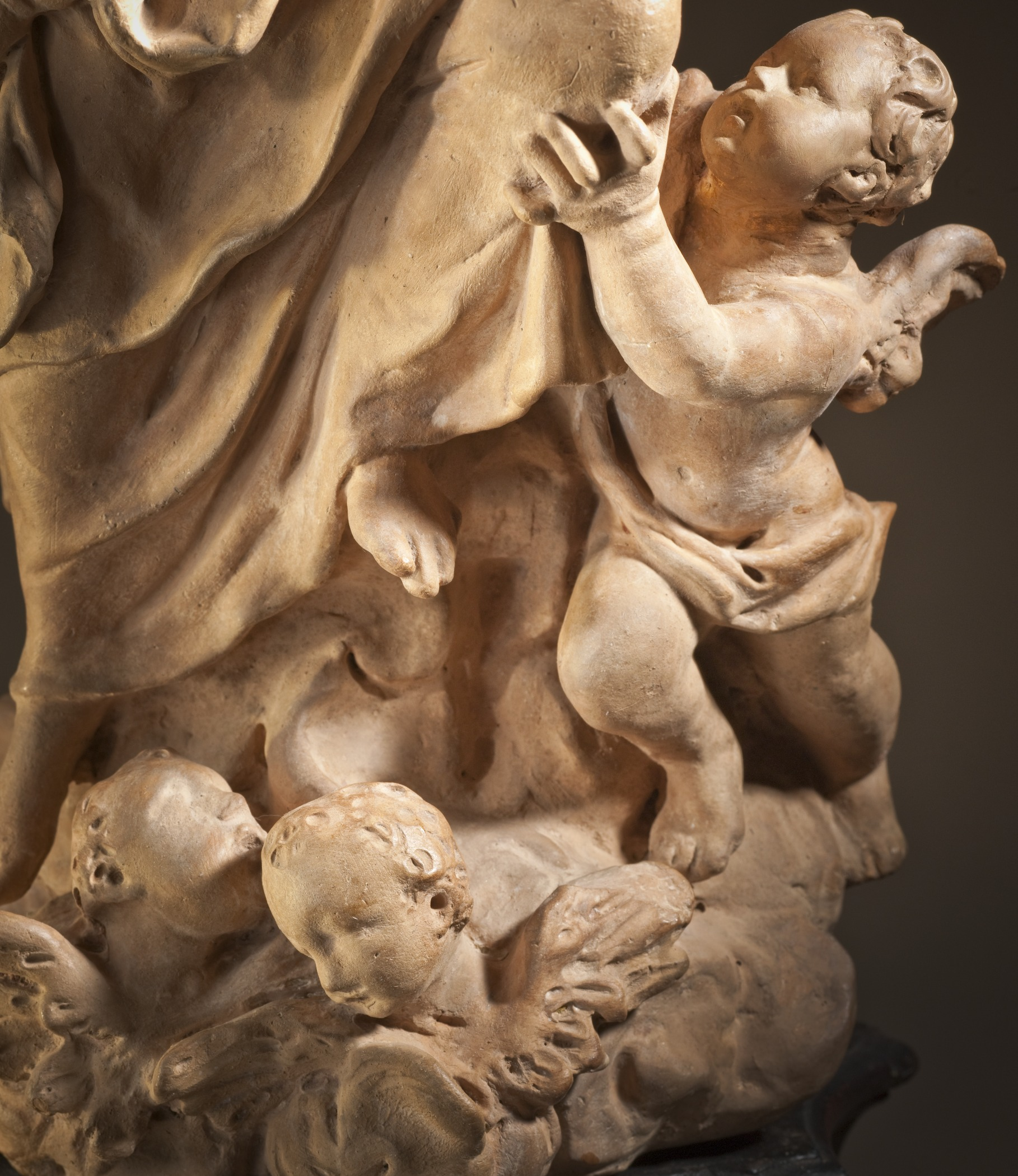
Bozzetto for the Marble 'The Assumption of the Virgin' in the Padua Cathedral (particular)

== Sources ==
- Honour, Hugh (1998). "BONAZZA, Antonio". Dizionario Biografico degli Italiani (in Italian). Vol. 11: Boccadibue–Bonetti. Rome: Istituto dell'Enciclopedia Italiana. ISBN 978-88-12-00032-6.
- Boucher, Bruce (1998). Thames & Hudson, World of Art (ed.). Italian Baroque Sculpture. pp. 103–4.
