= Arthur Acton =

British art dealer and collector

- Born: 1873
- Died: 1953 (aged 79–80)
- Occupations: Architect, art dealer and collector
- Spouse: Hortense Lenore Mitchell
- Children: Sir Harold Acton; William Acton; Liana Beacci
- Relatives: John J. Mitchell (son of father-in-law)

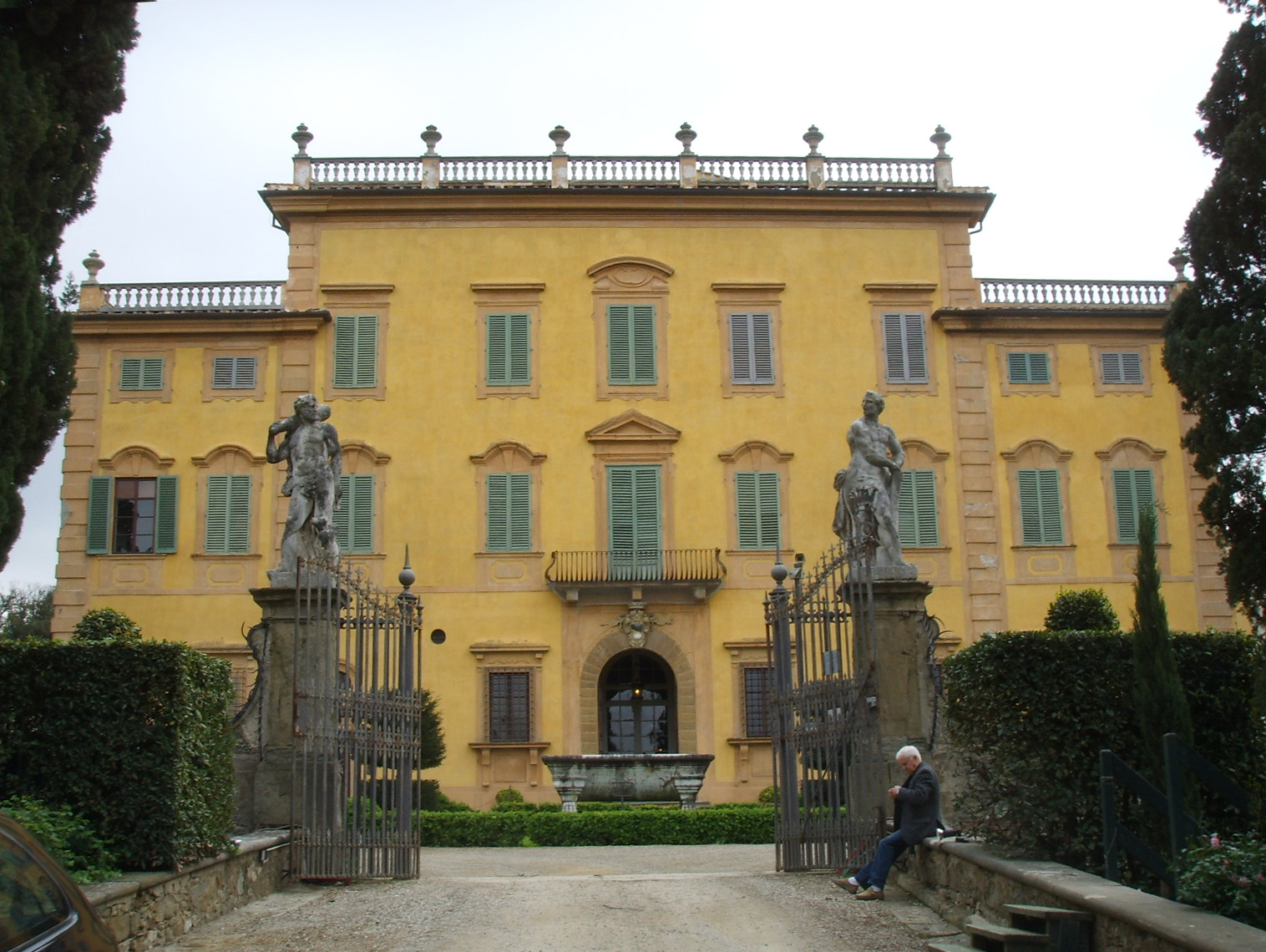
Villa La Pietra, Florence

Arthur Mario Acton (1873–1953) was a British architect, art dealer and collector.

== Early life ==
Arthur Acton was the illegitimate son of Eugene Arthur Roger Acton (1836–1895), counsellor to the Egyptian Ministry of Agriculture and Commerce.

== Personal life ==
Acton married the wealthy Chicago heiress Hortense Lenore Mitchell (1871–1962), whose father, was William Hamilton Mitchell (1817-1910), her inheritance came through John J. Mitchell (1853–1927), who was president of the Illinois Trust and Savings Bank from 1880 to 1923, then president of its successor, the Illinois Merchants Trust Company, from 1923 until his death. They lived at the Villa La Pietra, Florence.

Their elder son was the writer, scholar, and aesthete Sir Harold Mario Mitchell Acton (1904–1994). Their younger son, William Hamilton Mitchell Acton (1906–1945), was an artist.

Acton also fathered a daughter, Liana Beacci (1917–2000), with his secretary Ersilia Beacci (died 1953). Liana's daughter is Princess Dialta Alliata di Montereale.
