= Vaccarecce Lighthouse =

The Vaccarecce Lighthouse (Faro delle Vaccarecce) or Ancient Giglio Lighthouse (Faro antico del Giglio) is an Italian lighthouse in the Tyrrhenian Sea designed in 1830 and completed sometime in the 1850s. The lighthouse is no longer operational. The structure is situated on a hill to the north of the village of Giglio Castello in the Italian municipal area Isola del Giglio on the island of Giglio. It is a maritime lighthouse but was originally used to light the island.

The masonry lighthouse complex includes an octagonal tower atop a rectangular building. The tower has three floors and includes a wraparound balcony and a terrace at the top (former base of the now-lost lantern).

== History ==
The lighthouse was finished in 1850. Attempts were made to have the structure light the entire island, but this proved impossible, given that its focal plane was too high. In 1883 a new Fenaio Lighthouse was built by the Regia Marina, the Italian Navy.

In June 2015, after 10 years of disuse, the lighthouse was purchased by Roger Vivier's creative director, Gherardo Felloni. The compound is now residential and includes galleries, historical private lodging, and several estate gardens and surrounded by grape vines and pine woods. Since 2020, more than 2,000 trees and plants have been added to the space.

== See also ==
- Isola del Giglio
- List of lighthouses in Italy

== Sources ==
- Nelli, Lucia Ceccherini (2018). Soluzioni innovative di risparmio energetico per edifici Nearly Zero energy. Esperienze di progettazione ambientale. Ediz. illustrata (in Italian). Firenze: Didapress. ISBN 978-88-3338-012-4.
