= Elevator shoe =

Shoes that make the wearer appear taller

Elevator shoes are shoes that have thickened sections of the insoles (known as shoe lifts) under the heels to make the wearer appear taller, or "elevate" them as the name suggests.

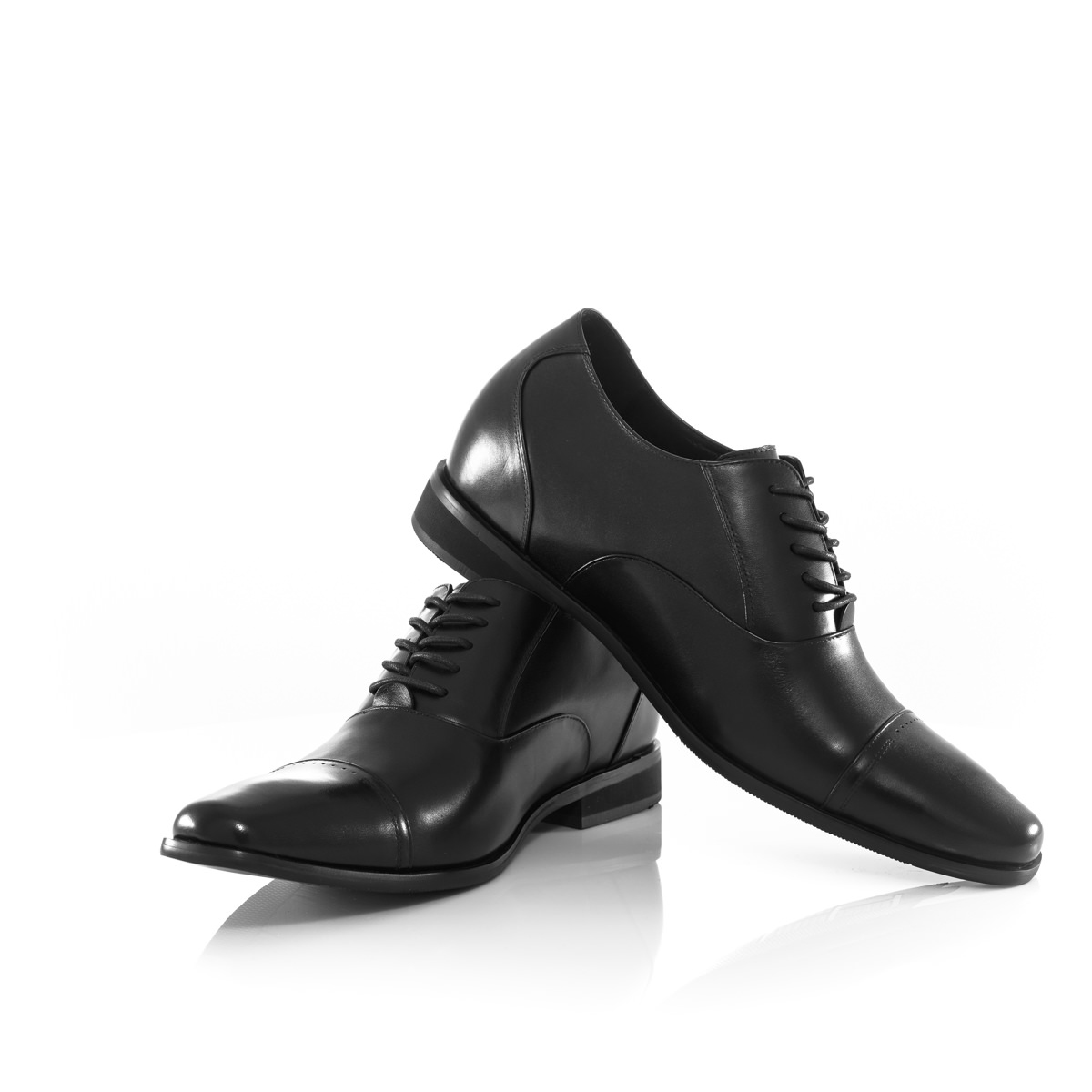
Gershwin black elevator shoes

Unlike high-heeled shoes, the component of elevator shoes that increases the wearer's height is inside the shoe, hiding it from observers. An elevator shoe, like the platform shoe's heel, can be made from different soles like plastic, wood, or rubber. Shoes with thickened soles are also used in cases of orthopedic problems, although the term "elevator shoe" is not usually used for these.

== See also ==
- List of shoe styles
- Platform shoe
- Shoe insert
- Dress shoe
