= Herman Delman =

American Shoe Designer (1895–1955)

- Born: Hyman Benjamin Nudelman; 2 September 1895; Porterville, California, USA
- Died: 12 October 1955 (aged 60); New York
- Known for: Shoe Design & Manufacturing
- Spouse(s): Anna Sue Jordahn (m. c. 1945-1955; Yeffe Goodman Kimball (m. 1936-div. c. 1945); Elsie Klein (m. 1921-div. 1935)
- Children: 2

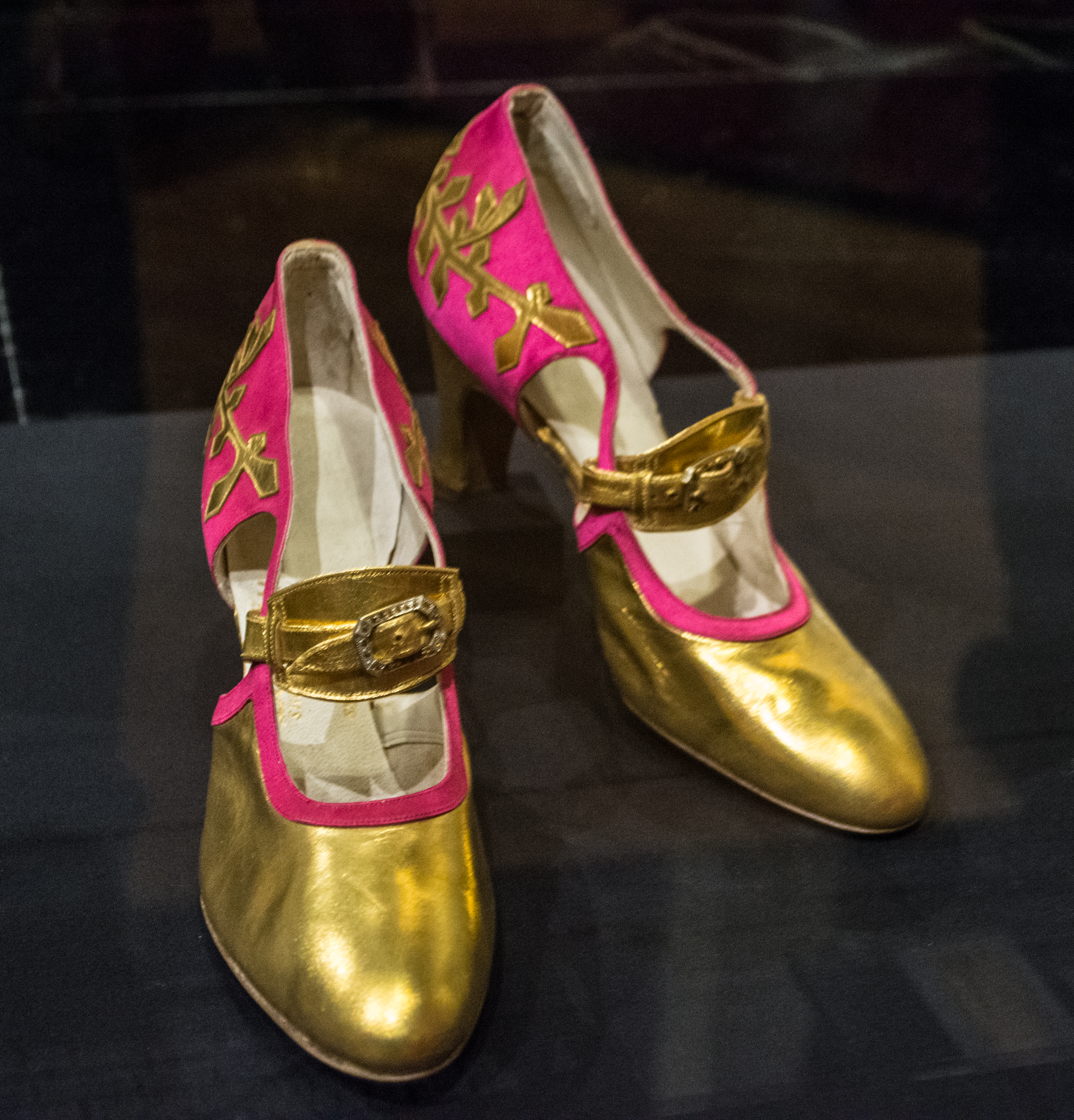
Delman Evening Shoes

Herman Delman (September 2, 1895 – October 12, 1955) was an American shoe designer and manufacturer who reigned over the American shoe industry from 1920 to 1950. He was the first designer to photograph his shoes on the feet of Broadway and film stars and then use the images in print ads. He was the first shoe designer to put his own name on every shoe, and he was the first shoe manufacturer to partner with clothing stores, and create the store-within-a-store concept. He became known as the “great showman of the New York footwear industry” and is credited with bringing international acclaim to American fashion.

== Early life and education ==
Delman was born Hyman Benjamin Nudelman, the eldest of five children of Samuel and Sophia Nudelman. His grandfather, Joseph Nudelman, was part of the Am Olam movement, which saw thousands of Russian Jews move to the US to establish agricultural communities. After failing in North Dakota and Nevada, Joseph moved to California, where Hyman was born. In 1914, the family moved to Portland, Oregon, where the extended Nudelman family was well established. Joseph and his sons joined the family on the city's Alberta Street; Joseph opened a kosher market and Samuel opened a shoe store. Hyman and his cousins all joined the Marine Corps; when they were discharged, his cousins established what would become the well-known Nudelman Brothers Uniforms and Hyman went back to his father's shoe store. In 1918, his father sent him to New York on a buying trip and Hyman decided to stay. He convinced his father to underwrite the cost of another store, changed his name to Herman Delman and, in 1919, opened a small shop on Madison Avenue.

== Career ==
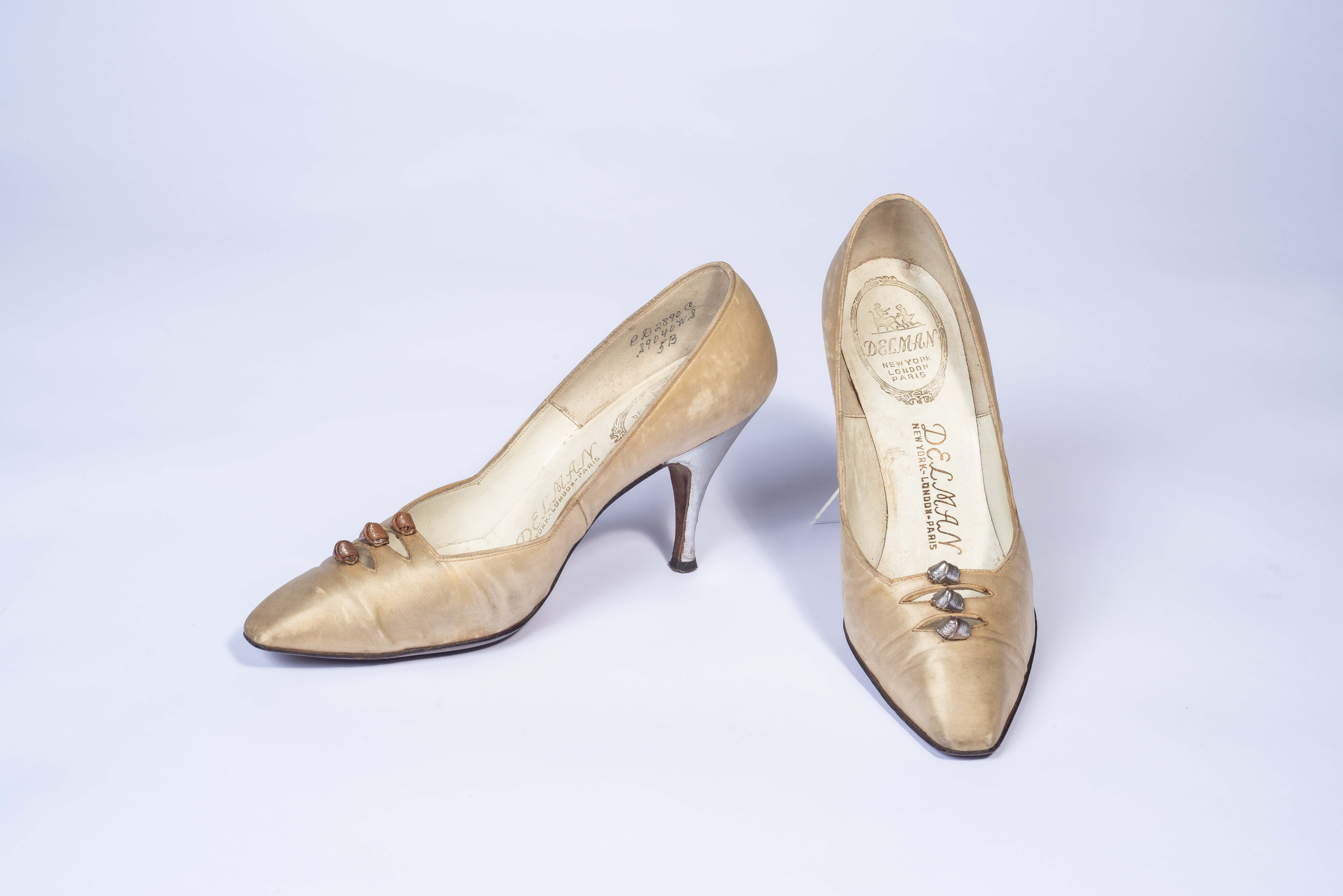
Delman Satin Evening Shoes

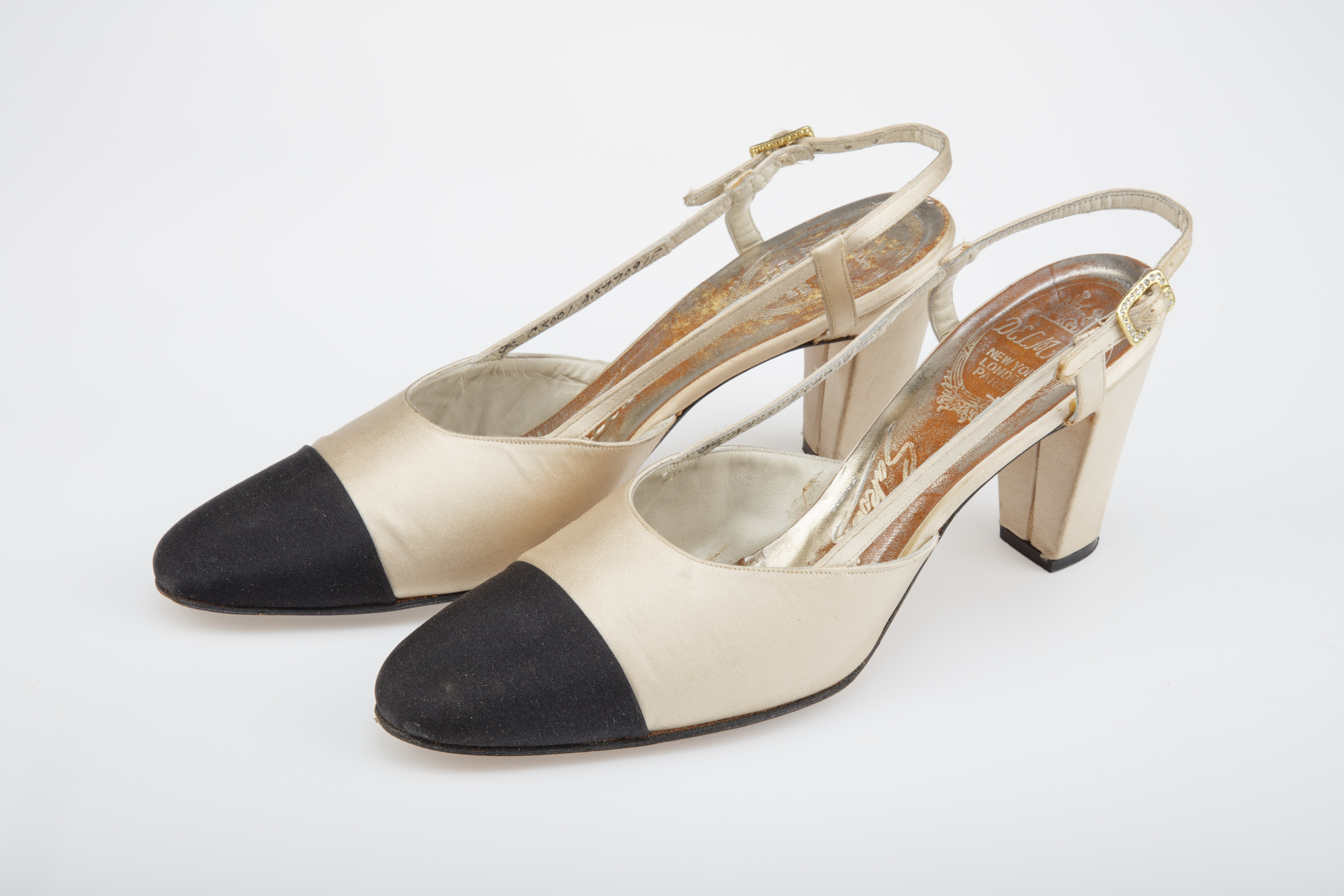
Delman Satin Slingbacks

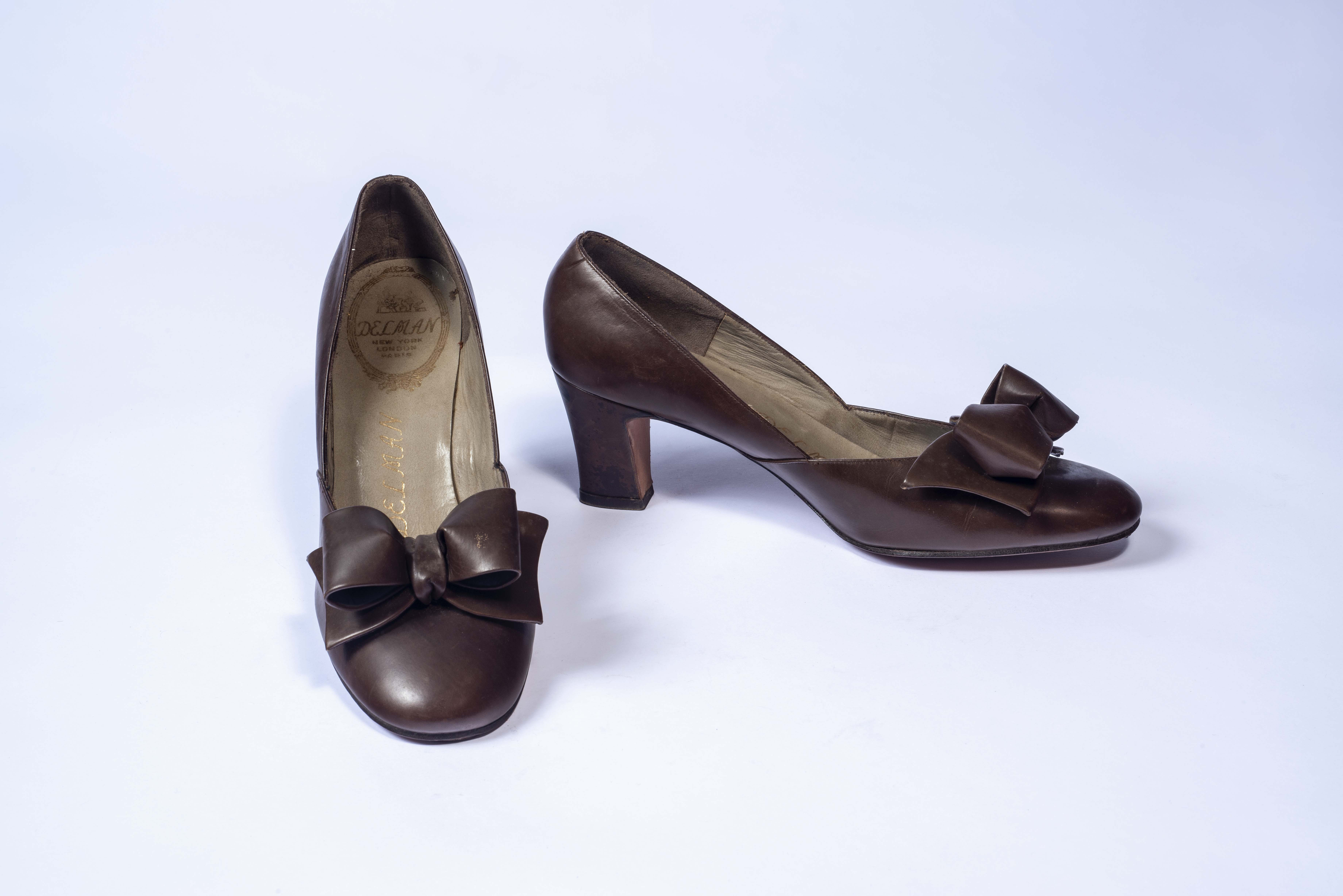
Delman Day Shoes

Declaring that he wanted to "beautify the female foot", Delman sought out New York's most skilled cobblers and began producing high-quality custom-made shoes, of his own design. He was highly creative with design, and innovative in business and, through exquisitely illustrated print ads, social functions and elaborate fashion shows, he targeted New York's wealthy and stylish women. He was extroverted, charming, dapper, and an expert salesman. His business grew very quickly, given a push by his creation of the high metallic lace-up "Tango Shoe", later known as the "Scandal Sandal", for the Broadway star Irene Castle. In 1926, Delman's brother, Morris Nudelman, moved to New York to help manage the company. Both men legally changed their names to Delman and the company was incorporated as Delman Inc., with Morris as vice-president.

In 1926, the Delman shop moved up to 558 Madison Avenue. The shop on lower Madison was eye-catching; Delman had installed a large round window and put his shoemakers to work in the window. Now, Delman's was a "Salon", sumptuously decorated in the style of Louis XVI with shoes displayed in galleries. A review in The Shoe Retailer magazine describes ”the special evening slipper room, intimate as a boudoir, where only evening slippers are sold and exclusive fittings are given to bridal parties”. Delman shoes were luxurious, chic and unique—sometimes in zebra, frog, and monkey skin, usually in leather, silk and/or velvet, some studded with precious stones, many piped with gold and silver, others painted with aluminum to glow in the dark. Prices began at $15.00 ($285 in 2026), and went as high as $500.00 ($9400 in 2026). Through the 1920s, the salon was a magnet for New York's wealthy women, including Mamie Eisenhower, Lucretia Stotesbury, Mona von Bismarck, Nina Gore, Carrie Munn, and several members of the Gould family. More importantly for Delman, there were now famous film actresses and, against stiff competition from Bally and the Hollywood favorite Salvatore Ferragamo, Delman also targeted the burgeoning film industry. He chose as his muses the silent film stars Margalo Gillmore, Joan Crawford and Marlene Dietrich and made shoes for their films—in Crawford's case, his shoes can be seen in Dancing Lady (1933) and Mannequin (1937). Once the films were released, he heavily marketed the shoes worn by the actresses; in the 1940s, he would do the same with Marilyn Monroe and Ava Gardner.

In 1933, Delman shut his store and went full-time into manufacturing. The company quickly became known for high-quality, high-style shoes that were extremely comfortable and, by 1934, Delman Inc.’s factory was producing 2,500 pairs a week. Style innovations included the cocktail booty, triangular heels, the cut-out heel, the platform sole, and the split sole, where the heel was a wedge and the foresole was a platform. He also introduced elegant flat shoes, including the Ballet flat, sales of which boomed when they became the favorite of Katharine Hepburn. Opera star Risë Stevens wore Delman shoes at every one of her performances. During World War II, when leather was rationed, Delman introduced the wooden platform and produced the "Cinderella Slipper", an evening shoe made of glass fabric with glass heels. By the end of the war, he was showing strappy suede sandals dotted with nail heads, mesh slippers bound in satin, and shoes with carved platforms, gabardine platforms, embroidery, and cameo buckles. Delman offered a custom shoe service and, by the late 1940s, Delman shoes were constantly worn by everyone who was "anyone", with his long list of loyal customers including Jackie Kennedy and Queen Elizabeth, who wore ruby-studded Delmans at her 1953 Coronation.

There were also technical innovations. In 1933, Delman hired Fiorentino Maccarone, the Neapolitan inventor of the detachable heel-lift. For Delman, Maccarone invented a cheaper and easier method of making shoes. Traditionally, shoes were made by sewing the soles to the upper leather while the shoes were inside out, then turning them right side out; that pulled at the fabric and leather and the shoes had to be re-shaped. Maccarone's process was to shape the shoe and use cement to attach a single flexible sole. In 1926, Maccarone had patented his other invention, the Sbicca Method, which he perfected in 1931. The Sbicca process was very similar but involved extra cutting. Delman combined his name with Maccarone's and established the Del-Mac System Corporation. At the time, there was heated competition among American shoe manufacturers, mainly Delman, I. Miller & Sons, the Milius Shoe Company and Grossman Shoes, all of whom were patenting various innovations. It appears that Delman was the most litigious; both the Sbicca and the new Del-Mac method were patented and, despite the fact that it eventually transpired that Maccarone had not invented the Sbicca Method, Delman sued anyone who made shoes with the same method without being licensed by Del-Mac. Delman was also sued—in one case, in connection with the patent on a cutting machine, for fraud.

In 1933, Delman entered into an exclusive retail agreement with Saks Fifth Avenue for Manhattan; outside of Manhattan, his shoes were sold in 30 cities. In 1936, he formed partnerships with Bonwit Teller and Bergdorf Goodman, where he established The Delman Salon and created the store-within-a-store concept. In 1935, he entered into one of the world's first licensing agreements, with the Rayne Shoe Company, through which Rayne manufacturing Delman shoes in the UK. At this point, people were going to movie theaters to watch news reels; Delman created his own news reels to target these captive audiences, another first for a shoe manufacturer. In the 1930s and 1940s, he hired the most talented shoe designers of the day, including Steven Arpad, Beth Levine, Herbert Levine, and Bernice Shaftan who, when Delman wanted to target young women in 1949, designed the youthful and affordable "Delmanette" line. He partnered with the French designer André Perugia, and with the artist Erté, who created unique works of art such as a gold and rhinestone evening shoe with a wooden heel hand-painted with the coat of arms of the City of Paris. But his most significant partnership was with the preeminent French shoe designer Roger Vivier, who joined Delman in 1938 and stayed with the company until 1962. Beginning in 1953, Vivier was simultaneously working for Christian Dior but because he was first contracted to Delman, shoes from this period contain the label 'Delman-Dior' or 'Dior-Delman'. The three men worked together; Dior often worked from Vivier's shoe designs, and those designs were often created at the request, or inspiration of, Herman Delman. Delman and Dior established a made-to-order division in Paris, which continued well into the 1960s.

In 1940, Delman took a permanent suite at the Madison Hotel and bought a house in Palm Beach, where he spent most of his time. Also in 1940, he bought a farm near Lexington Kentucky and established Dell Stables. He made a significant investment in the acquisition of thoroughbred horses, which competed at top-tier tracks along the East Coast, including Saratoga, Hialeah, Belmont Park, and Aqueduct. In keeping with his talent for hiring the right people, Delman's horses were usually ridden by the jockey Eddie Arcaro and Delman enjoyed an extremely successful career as an owner. In 1945, his horse "Coronal" won the prestigious Merchants and Citizens Handicap; in 1951, his horse "How" won the Kentucky Oaks.

In 1947, there was a schism between Herman and his brother Morris. Morris left Delman Inc. and founded his own manufacturing company, Trevi Footwear, through which he partnered with the designers Evelyn and Frank Lipare to establish Liparé Shoes. This company was in business until 1955, when Morris died at 53, two months before Herman.

In 1952, Delman was diagnosed with cancer and, in 1954, sold Delman Inc. to the retailing giant Genesco. Genesco sold it to Rayne which, in 1973, sold Rayne-Delman to Debenhams. In 1989, Delman was acquired by the Nina Footwear Corporation. As of 2026, Delman is an active division of Nina, and Nina maintains a significant Delman archive. Delman's personal 150-piece collection of historic footwear, including pieces from the 17th and 18th centuries, was donated to the Brooklyn Museum Costume Collection at The Metropolitan Museum of Art.

== Personal life and death ==
In 1921, Delman married Elsie Klein (1897–1971); they had one son, born in 1924. In c 1933, on a sales trip to Kansas City, Delman met Yeffe Kimball (Effie Goodman, 1906–1978), an artist who was working at Harzfeld's department store. He brought her to New York and Delman divorced Elsie who, in 1935, filed a $100,000. suit against Kimball for "alienation of affections". Delman married Kimball c. 1936; they had no children and divorced c. 1945. In c. 1946, Delman married Anna Sue Jordahn (1920 – 2002). They had one son and remained married until 1955, when Delman died at the Madison Hotel, at age 60.
