= Gherardo Felloni =

Italian fashion designer

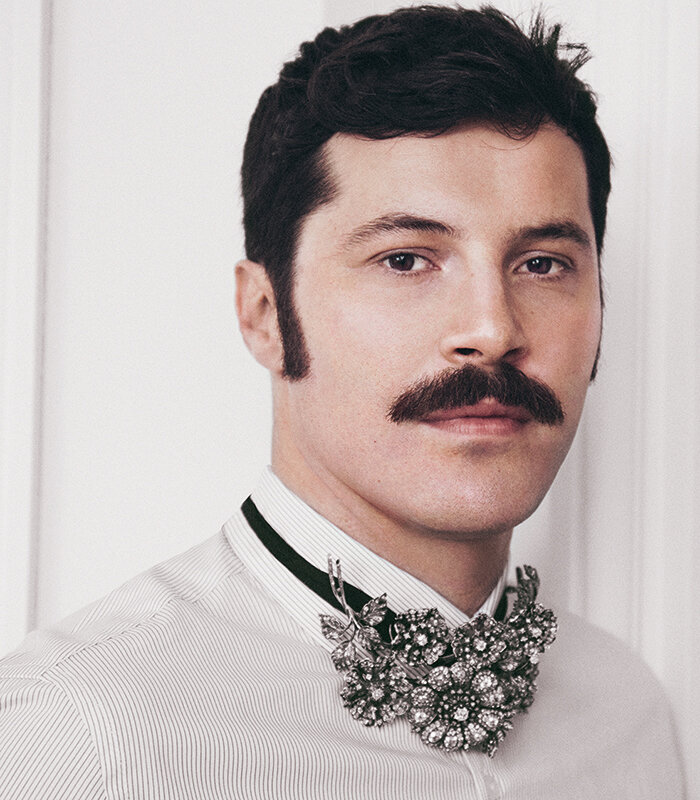
- Born: Gherardo Felloni; 27 February 1980 (age 45); Arezzo, Italy
- Occupation: Fashion designer

Gherardo Felloni (born 27 February 1980) is an Italian fashion designer and the current creative director of the House of Roger Vivier.

== Early life and education ==
Felloni was born in Tuscany, Italy, in the 1980s. He grew up in a family of footwear artisans and shoemakers. Both his father and uncle owned a shoe factory in Arezzo, which operated from 1958 until the early 2000s, producing shoe samples for designers such as Prada, Gucci, and Hermès.

Felloni completed high school with a focus on biological and sanitary sciences. He later studied opera at the Conservatoire de Paris, where he trained as a tenor, counting Laura Agnoloni among his teachers. Additionally, he studied acting in Rome with actress and producer Stefania de Santis. Felloni is a collector of contemporary art and antique jewelry from the 19th century, both of which strongly influence his style. He spends much of his time at Faro delle Vaccarecce, a lighthouse where he resides on the Isola del Giglio.

== Career ==
Felloni worked for Fendi and Helmut Lang before eventually moving to Paris, France, to join Dior. Afterward, he spent over a decade working for Miu Miu and Prada.

In 2018, Felloni became the creative director of Roger Vivier. Since taking on the role, he has embraced Vivier’s iconic use of color, shape, and the signature square buckle while moving the brand forward with a modern approach. Following his appointment, he redesigned the headquarters in Paris and continues to explore interior design, blending old and modern elements, with art, shoes, auction pieces, and souvenirs displayed throughout the headquarters and his home. His interior design style has been described as a mix of exuberance and elegance with touches of architectural formalism.

The designer revived the brand’s couture week presentation in July 2023, showcasing a collection of unique handbags as part of his vision to expand the accessories business. To celebrate the 60th anniversary of Roger Vivier's Virgule heel, Felloni re-launched the shoe for Fall/Winter 2024, featuring bold colors and a shiny finish. Early in his tenure at Roger Vivier, he introduced a jewelry line, drawing on his experience from Miu Miu, where he had been head of footwear, leather goods, and costume jewelry. In November 2023, he was honored as Designer of the Year at the 37th annual FN Achievement Awards.

One of Felloni's first initiatives at the label was to introduce its first sneaker, the Viv’Run. For Spring 2024, he also reintroduced the classic Viv’Canard, updating the traditional slingback design with an elongated toe. Other models introduced by Felloni at Roger Vivier include a buckled shoe with an extended buckle and a thicker heel, as well as the Maharaja slipper, which he refined with a slimmer silhouette, stone embellishments, and a single feather.

Inès de La Fressange and actress Catherine Deneuve are two of the House's long-term international ambassadors.
