= Platform shoe =

Footwear with a thick platform sole

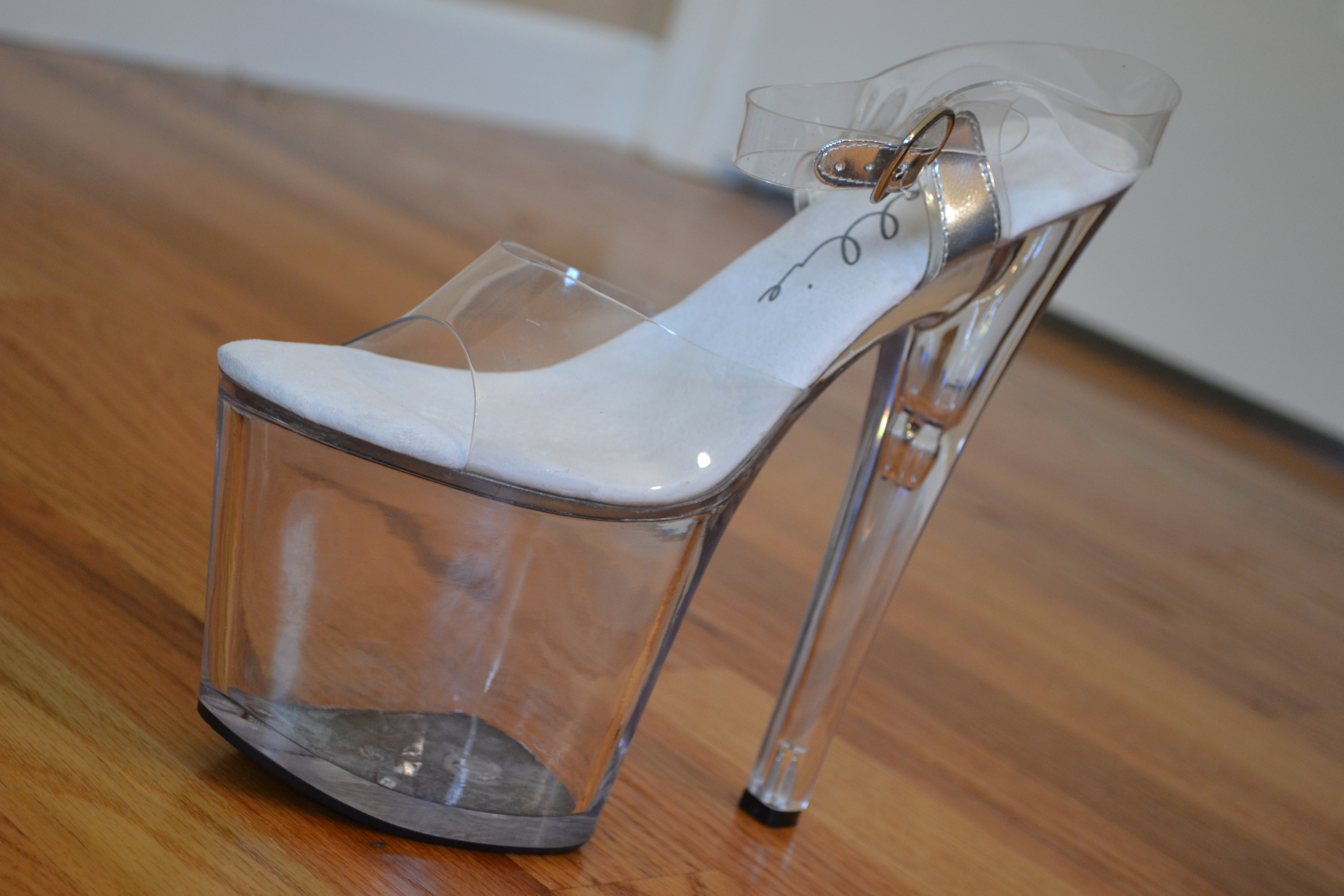
An example of a 20-centimetre (8-inch) platform clear heel

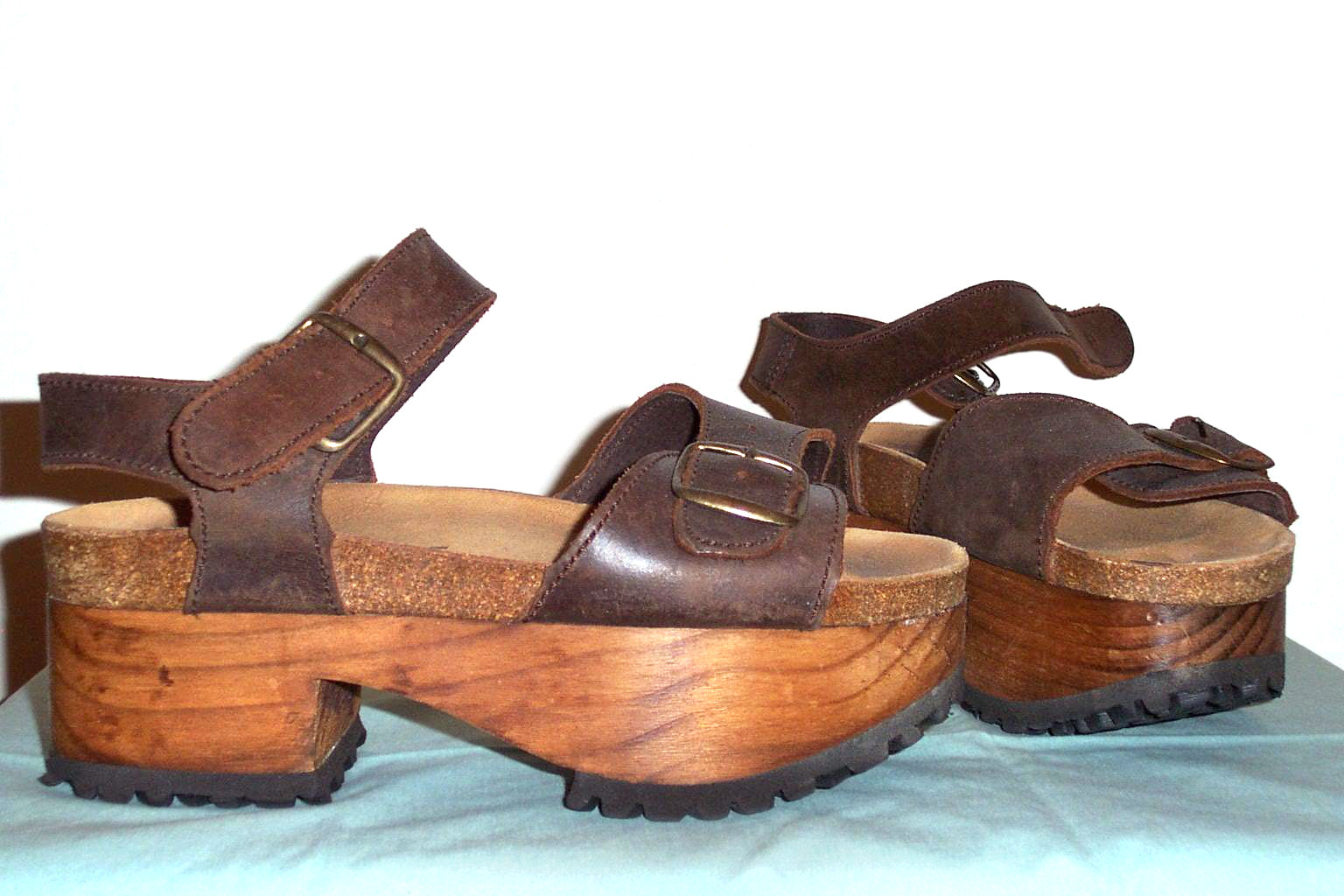
Platform sandals with wooden sole

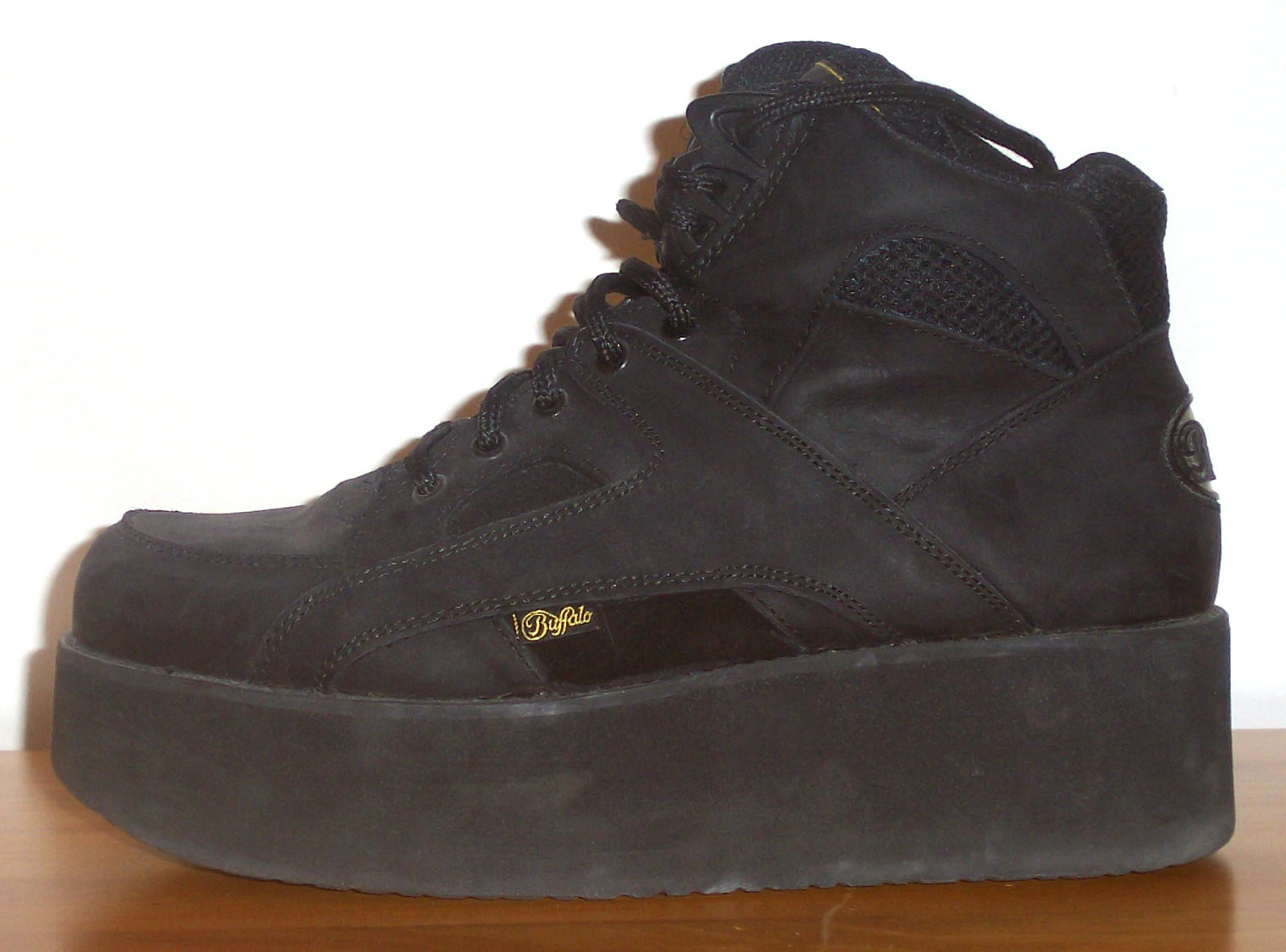
Platform boot, ankle length

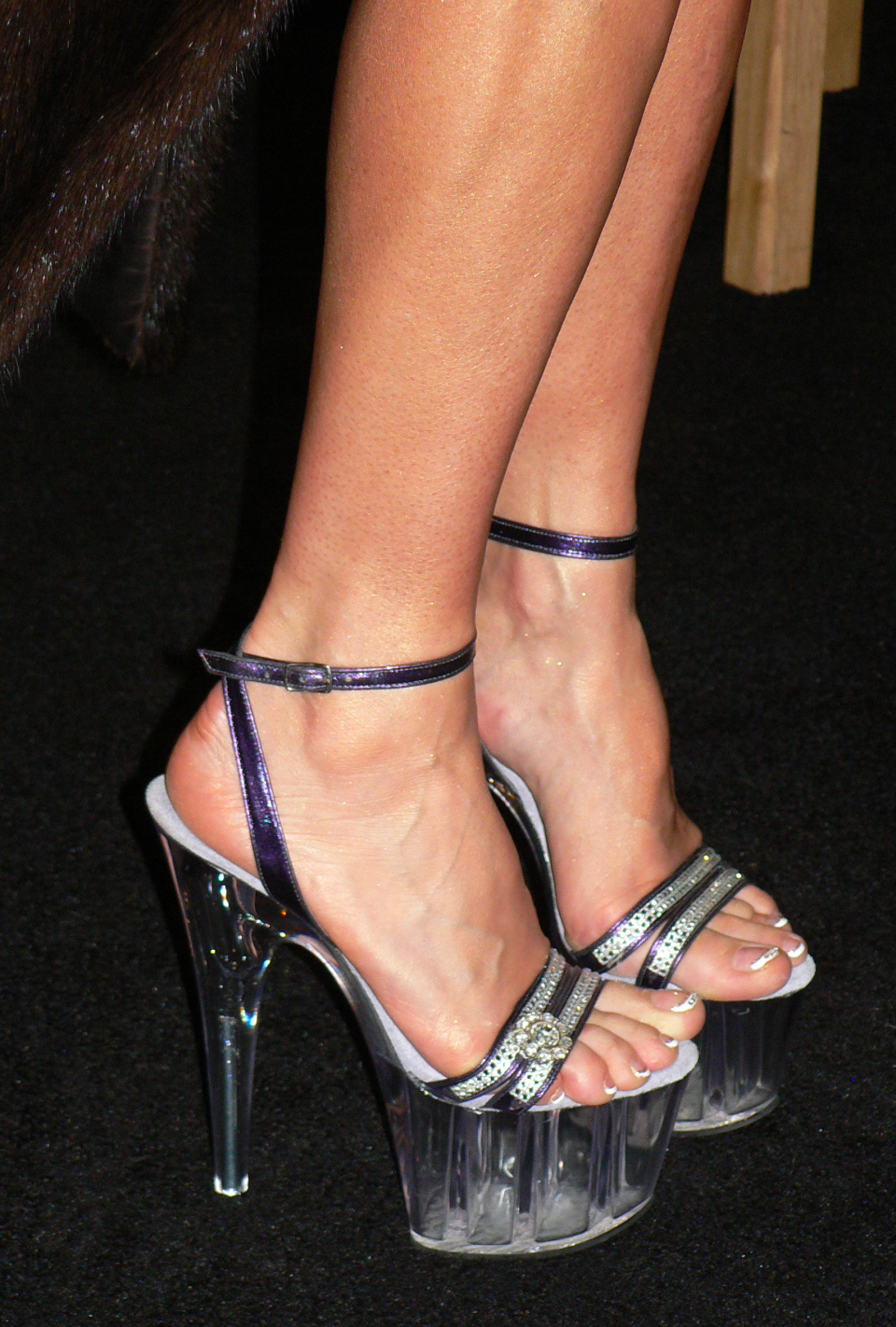
Lucite platform shoes

Platform shoes are shoes, boots, sandals, even slippers or flip-flops with a thick sole, usually in the range of 5–10 cm (2–4 in). Platform shoes may also be high heels, in which case the heel is raised significantly higher than the ball of the foot. Extreme heights, of both the sole and heel, can be found in fetish footwear such as ballet boots, where the sole may be up to 20 cm (8 in) high and the heels up to 40 cm (16 in) or more. The sole of a platform shoe can have a continuous uniform thickness, have a wedge, a separate block or a stiletto heel. Raising the ankle increases the risk of a sprained ankle.

== History ==
Platform shoes are known in many cultures. The most famous predecessor of platform shoes are the Zoccoli in Venice of the 15th century, designed with the functional goal of avoiding wet feet when the pavements were flooded. Depending on the current shoe fashion, platform shoes are more or less popular. In the 1970s they were widespread in both genders in Europe. Today, they are preferred by women.

=== Ancient ===
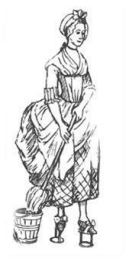
A maid wearing circle-type pattens: Piety in Pattens or Timbertoe on Tiptoe, England 1773

After their use in Ancient Greece for raising the height of important characters in the Greek theatre and their similar use by high-born prostitutes or courtesans in London in the sixteenth century, platform shoes, called pattens, are thought to have been worn in Europe in the eighteenth century to avoid the muck of urban streets. Of the same practical origins are Japanese geta. There may also be a connection to the buskins of Ancient Rome, which frequently had very thick soles to give added height to the wearer. Another example of a platform shoe that functioned as protection from dirt and grime is the Okobo- "Okobo" referring to the sound that the wooden shoe makes when walking. Dating back to 18th century Japan, the Okobo was worn by maikos, or geishas, during their apprenticeships. Similar to the Okobo, wooden Kabkabs were named after the sound they made upon marble flooring. Worn by Lebanese women between the 14th and 17th centuries, the straps were often made from velvet, leather, or silk while the wooden stilts were decorated with silver or pearl. The ancient Indian Paduka, which translates to footprints of the Gods, was often sported by the upper echelon as a way to mark their status. The wooden platforms were sometimes carved into different animal shapes and decorated with ivory and silver. In ancient China, men wore black boots with very thick soles made from layers of white cloths. This style of boots is often worn today onstage for Peking opera. During the Qing dynasty, aristocratic Manchu women wore a form of platform known as the flowerpot shoe to imitate the gait of Han women with bound feet and their lotus shoes.

=== Modern ===
Platform shoes enjoyed some popularity from the late 1930s to the mid-1940s but not nearly to the extent of their popularity in the first half of the 1970s.

==== 20th century ====
===== 1930s-1950s =====
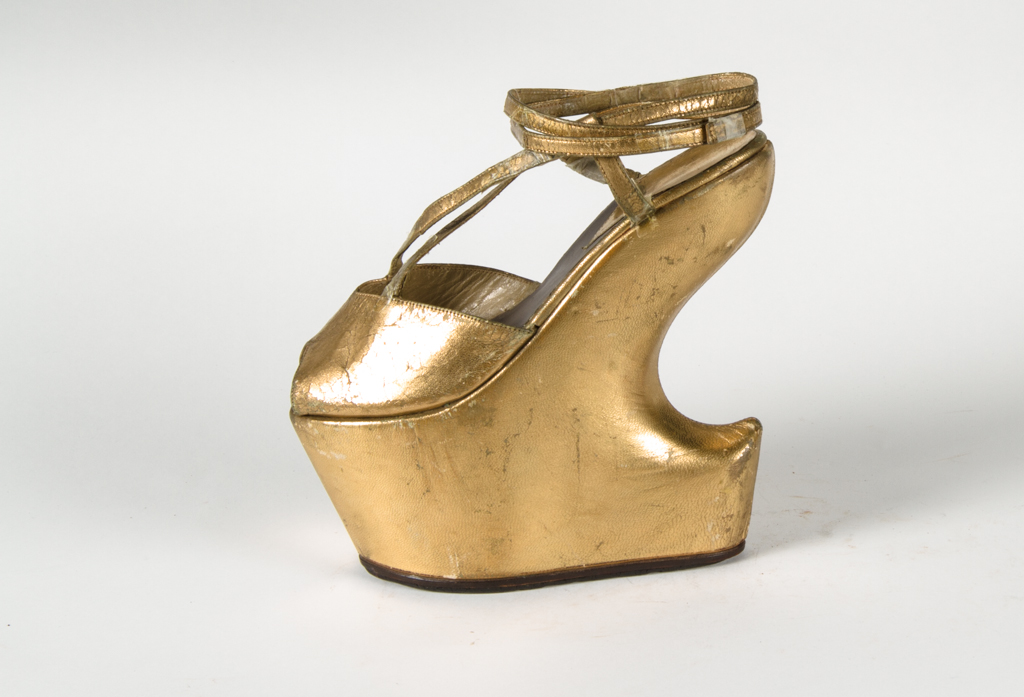
Carmen Miranda was key in popularizing platform shoes in the 1940s.

In the early 1930s, Moshe (Morris) Kimel designed the first modern version of the platform shoe for actress Marlene Dietrich. Kimel, a Jew, escaped Berlin, Germany, and settled in the United States with his family in 1939 and opened the Kimel shoe factory in Los Angeles. The design soon became very popular amongst Beverly Hills elite.

By 1936, Salvatore Ferragamo was producing a variety of platforms of multiple heights and extensive ornamentation, including platforms paved in mirror-shiny metallic gold tiles. Some of his platforms featured soles that allowed the footbed to bend more naturally with each step because they were constructed of two separate blocks of wood or cork, one attached under the ball of the foot and one attached immediately behind that moved away from the other as the foot flexed while walking.

In the summer of 1937, high, cork-soled platform shoes became popular at European resorts and would influence footwear for the next few years. In the final two years of the 1930s, an array of platform shoe styles proliferated and could be seen in fashion magazines and popular periodicals: platform sandals, platform clogs, high platforms, low platforms, cut-out platforms, platforms with elevated heels, platforms where the foot sits flat, wooden platforms, platforms with separate heels, platforms with continuous wedge heels (a Ferragamo invention), lavishly decorated platforms, platforms with contoured bottoms sometimes called rocker bottoms for ease of walking, platforms with sunken foot beds to better hold the sole on the foot and keep the toes from protruding, even platforms with battery-operated flashing lights in their wedge heels. Many of the platform soles were so thin that they might not even be considered platforms by the standards of later decades but they were called that at the time. Others were as high as any from the 1970s and sometimes more impractical in being tapered and sculpted.

Prominent designers and manufacturers included Ferragamo, Perugia, who designed for Schiaparelli, and Delman, who employed Roger Vivier. Designers found that the platform sole offered an enlarged canvas for the addition of color and texture. The public soon learned that platform soles cushioned the foot and protected it from puddles and sand. American Vogue opined that some of the shoes looked "clumsy" but encouraged their adoption, particularly for streetwear, emphasizing their comfort and practicality compared to more delicate high heels. The diversity of styles available contributed to a surge in popularity during the late 1930s, with Life magazine estimating in 1939 that platforms made up fifteen percent of current footwear sold.

In 1938, The Rainbow was a platform sandal designed by famous shoe designer Salvatore Ferragamo. “The Rainbow” was created and was the first instance of the platform shoe returning in modern days in the West. The platform sandal was designed for Judy Garland, an American singer, actress, and vaudevillian. This shoe was a tribute to Judy Garland's signature song “Over the Rainbow” performed in the Wizard of Oz in 1939. The shoe was crafted using uniquely shaped slabs of cork that were covered in suede to build up the wedge and gold kidskin was used for the straps. His creation was a result of experimentations with new materials because of wartime rationing during World War II. Traditionally heels were built up with leather, but because of the rationing of leather, he experimented with wood and cork The colors and design of this shoe still resemble modern shoe standards today.

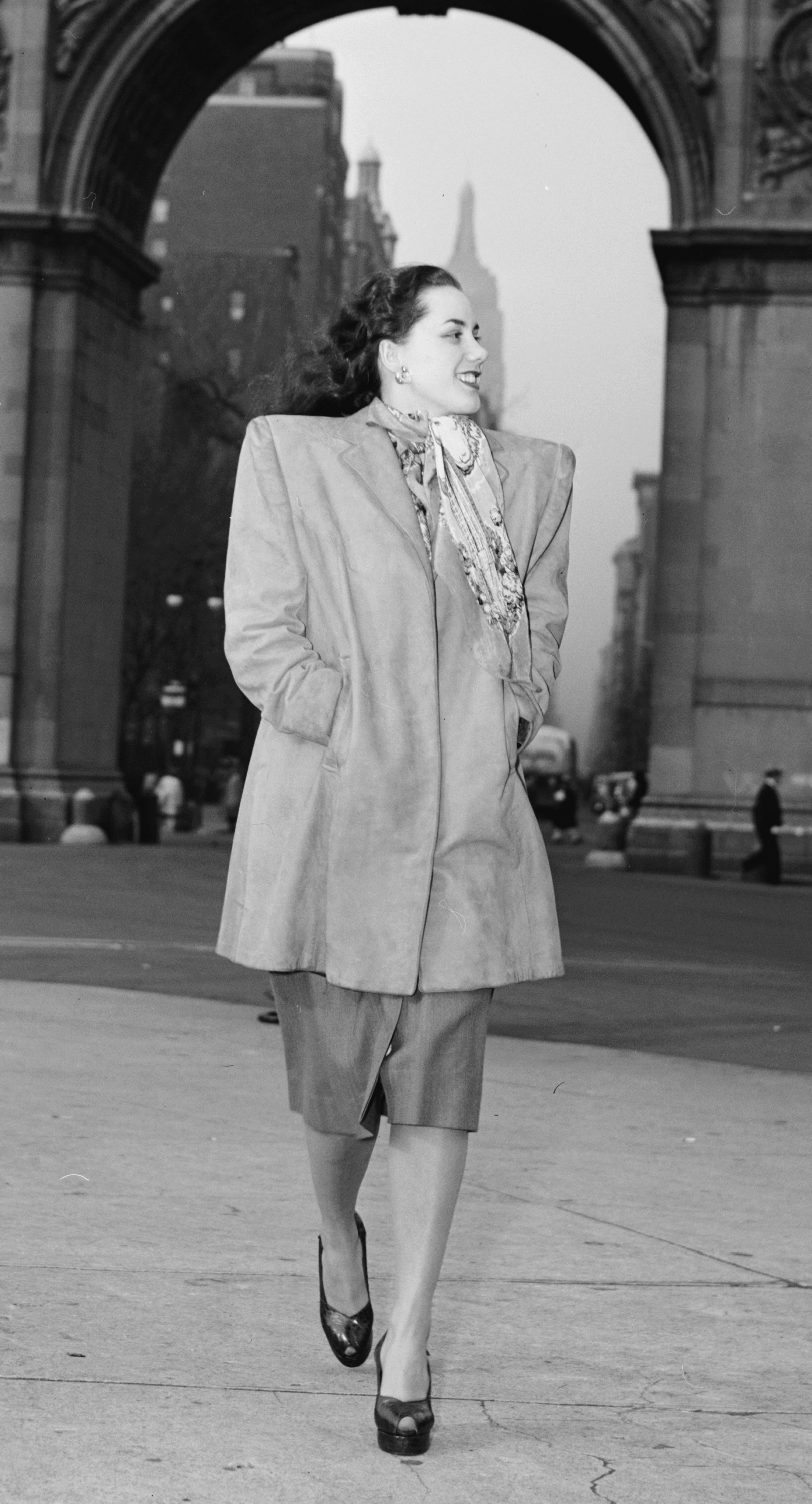
Jazz singer Ann Hathaway (1925-1997) wearing mid-40s platform shoes while walking in Washington Square, New York, 1947

Platform shoes continued to grow in popularity into the 1940s, their cork, wood, or plastic soles conforming to World War II material restrictions and the wartime need for practicality. The tighter the material restrictions, as in the UK, the rarer and lower were the platforms. In Nazi-occupied Paris, however, French women wore very high, very elaborate platform shoes in defiance of Nazi control and celebratory platforms were produced when Paris was liberated from the Nazis in 1944. Designers even worked on glow-in-the-dark platforms for use during blackouts.

In the 1940s, platforms were designed with a high arch, but as exemplified here, they originated with the heel elevated only slightly above the toes. The platform brings a heavy looking foundation to the wearer that is in direct polarity to the stiletto heel. With its reconfiguration of the arch and structure of attenuated insubstantiality, the high heel suggests the anti-gravitational effect of the dancer en pointe. On the contrary, the platform displays weightiness more like the flat steps of modern dance.

Platform shoes remained popular after the end of World War II, but Christian Dior's transformative 1947 "Corolle" collection directed the wearer toward a different fashion silhouette that did not include high platform shoes, and it was this look that would dominate the 1950s. A very low platform was sometimes seen during the late 1940s and early 1950s, especially on high-heeled sandals, but by the mid-fifties, these were gone, aided by cobblers who offered platform-removal services.

In the 1950s, platform shoes were not favored in the same way that they used to be. Fashion returned to the more elegantly shaped shoe.

===== 1960s and 1970s =====
A resurgence of interest in platform shoes in fashion began as early as 1967, when Roger Vivier produced a variety of footwear, including sandals and boots, with platform soles for Yves Saint Laurent's spring and fall collections. Two years later, other designers and mass-market manufacturers had thickened the soles of their shoes as the trend took off. By the year 1970, women's platform shoes were appearing in both advertisements and articles in issues of Seventeen magazine.

Platform shoes peaked in designer endorsement and public popularity in the early 1970s and were available in a myriad of styles: clogs, sandals, pumps, oxfords, moccasins, espadrilles, slides, thongs, boots, etc, with platforms ranging in height from very low to many inches high. Heels could lie even with the ball of the foot (flat) or be elevated above the platform sole by up to four inches. The shape of platforms was almost always straight up and down, occasionally with a slight taper. Heels were always thick and chunky, whether they were separate heels from the platform sole or continuous with the sole in a wedge shape. Stiletto and spike heels were not in style at all, as they had been popular in the very out-of-style 1950s, an era associated with social backwardness at the time. Platform soles could be made out of cork, wood, crepe, rubber, or other materials and be lugged, stacked, covered, or left unadorned. Platform espadrilles were popular, their soles covered in woven jute, raffia, hemp, rope, or canvas. Handicrafts were widely enjoyed in the early seventies and some platforms were hand-painted, appliquéd, adorned with studs, or embroidered.

Occasionally seen during the early 1970s peak in interest in platform shoes was a playful 1940s-revival look, seen most famously in Yves Saint Laurent's fall 1970 and spring '71 collections, which included forties-looking platform wedge sandals with forties-style high turbans and shoulder pads. Forties platform shoes by this point were remembered as consisting of ankle straps, peep toes, and often bows on the vamp, though in reality 1940s platform shoes had been very diverse in style and shape, with many presaging popular styles of the 1970s. Other high fashion designers also showed this caricatured 1940s look occasionally during the early seventies, as did more youth-oriented clothiers like Bus Stop out of the UK.

A new addition during the 1970s that did not exist during the 1940s and would not exist as mainstream fashion during later platform revivals was platforms for men. During the early 1970s, everyday men, men on the street, began wearing platform shoes and high, chunky heels in bold colors and materials, the larger shoes augmenting the silhouette of the wide, flared trouser hems that were the norm at the time. As with women, platforms worn under flared trousers gave an impression of length to the leg and added height. Men's platforms would be most in style and most popular during the early seventies, when they sometimes made up as much as a fifth of men's shoes sold, but they would continue to be seen sparingly into the mid-seventies. Male musical performers like Kiss, Slade, Parliament, the New York Dolls, the Bay City Rollers, and a number of other groups, as well as their fans, commonly wore very flashy platform shoes, particularly platform boots, during this time, as did female performers like ABBA, Stevie Nicks of Fleetwood Mac, the Runaways, and Suzi Quatro. Kiss would become associated with platform boots and continue wearing them for decades, almost throughout their career, long after they were no longer common streetwear.

While the wider heels of early seventies platform shoes were more stable than the stiletto-heeled pumps of the 1950s, their inflexible soles and great height resulted in numerous cases of falls and injuries, with occasional newspaper articles quoting podiatrists and consumer advocates warning against the dangers of the shoes. The platform boots of the time were a little safer because the shaft held the ankle securely in place and prevented the foot from slipping off the sole.

The high fashion world began to deemphasize platform shoes around 1973 but continued to include some platforms in their offerings through the mid-seventies, particularly platform espadrilles. Platform boots in the UK peaked in popularity in 1973 and then steadily decreased in popularity thereafter. Many of the popular high-heeled, thin-strapped sandals of the middle of the decade featured low platform soles as well, and the public continued to buy wood-soled and crepe-soled platforms with wedge heels, now increasingly in earthtones and less flashy than some early seventies models. Popular US platform brand names of the mid-seventies included Cherokee, Yoyo, and Famolare. Famolares were set on a crepe sole molded into springy wave shapes at the bottom, the waves emphasized by topographic-looking contour lines etched into the sides. These were enormously popular, available in sandal, oxford, and boot styles. Yoyos were one of a few styles that featured a hole cut into the wedge heel, a design detail also seen in the 1940s.

Platform shoes continued through to 1976 in Europe and Britain, when they suddenly went out of fashion. The fad lasted even further in the US, lasting until as late as the early 1980s. At the beginning of the fad, they were worn primarily by young women in their teens and twenties, and occasionally by younger girls, older women, and (particularly during the disco era) by young men. Platform shoes were considered the "party shoe." Disco-goers used their shoes to bring attention to themselves on the dance floor. 70s platform shoes were presented in dramatic and showy ways such as with glitter or tiny lights.

In 1972, at 219 Bowery in Manhattan, Carole Bascetta developed a special mold for making platform shoes and was successful in selling custom-made shoes to people such as David Bowie, David Johansen of the New York Dolls, and several other punk artists. Although platform shoes did provide added height without the discomfort of spike heels, they seem to have been worn primarily for the sake of attracting attention. Many glam rock musicians wore platform shoes as part of their act. Bowie, an icon of glam rock and androgynous fashion in the 1970s, famously wore platform shoes while performing as his alter ego Ziggy Stardust.

While a wide variety of styles were popular during this period, including boots, espadrilles, oxfords, sneakers, and sandals of all description, with soles made of wood, cork, or synthetic materials, the most popular style of the late 1960s and early 1970s was a simple quarter-strap sandal with tan water buffalo-hide straps, on a beige suede-wrapped cork wedge-heel platform sole. These were originally introduced under the brand name Kork-Ease but the extreme popularity supported many imitators. Remarkably, there was very little variation in style, and most of that variation was limited to differences in height.

During the late seventies, platform shoes went decisively out of style in the high-fashion world, most clearly with the fall 1978 collections that introduced what would become 1980s-style shoulder pads and suits. Unlike during the smaller 1940s revival of the early seventies, the forties-inspired silhouette of these 1978-through-1980s styles did not include platform shoes but flat soles, tapered toes, and high, narrow heels.

The punk styles that arose in 1976 and '77, particularly in the UK, also rejected the dominant styles of the 1970s like platform shoes, a trend that would continue during the 1980s.

As in the late 1940s and early 1950s, platforms lingered on in reduced form on the soles of strippy, high-heeled sandals. Such barely-platformed, very bare, high-heeled sandals were popular with both the calf-length skirts and the cigarette-leg pants, including jeans, of the late seventies. An example of this were the Candie's slides popular in the US in late 1978. Made by El Greco, these were single-strap mules with a molded, imitation-wood sole and heel that included a platform of about an inch, worn with just-introduced designer jeans, their cigarette legs rolled up to the ankle to show off the shoes.

Another exception to this retreat from platforms was seen in one of the myriad revival subcultures that came in the wake of punk in the late seventies. Male adherents of a UK 1950s-revival subculture known as Teddy Boys or rockabilly revivalists sometimes wore a shoe style from the early fifties referred to as brothel creepers due to their thick crepe sole, now often with the sole exaggerated and the uppers in punk-influenced blacks with aggressive-looking hardware trim.

===== 1980s =====
In mainstream fashion, platform shoes were not in style and were not worn during the 1980s, since much of the fashion of the 1980s was a rejection of the well known styles of the 1970s, particularly the early seventies when platform shoes had been at their peak of popularity. The fashion-conscious in the eighties rejected such early seventies trends as big sideburns, wide ties, wide lapels, polyester pantsuits, bell-bottom pants, and platform shoes, in some cases shaving off sideburns entirely, even eating up into the side hairline, and in all cases wearing shoes with the ball of the foot completely flat to the ground, for men and women, the most clear case of this being the popularity of completely flat, thin-soled, nearly heel-less jazz oxfords in the early years of the decade. In mainstream women's clothes, the standard item of fashionable eighties footwear was a somewhat 1950s-looking, tapered-toe pump with the sole at the ball of the foot flat and with various forms and heights of stiletto heel. When Perry Ellis and Walter Steiger each showed an isolated platform style for spring of 1983, Steiger acknowledged that the public would likely not accept them and they were not adopted; nor were a few platforms presented by Maud Frizon in 1981. The anti-seventies mood was so strong in the eighties that rock group Kiss stopped wearing their trademark glam-rock-era stage makeup and towering platform boots in 1983 and wouldn't wear them again until the seventies revival of the 1990s.

An exception to all of this was occasionally seen in the proliferating revival subcultures of the late seventies and early eighties, much of it coming out of the UK. Male 1950s-revival rockabilly aficionados or Teddy Boys occasionally wore a 50s-revival shoe style with a thick crepe sole called a brothel creeper, now usually influenced by punk and cartoonishly exaggerated with a very thick sole, lots of shiny hardware, and bright colors against a black background. These were also occasionally worn by non-subculture trendy types, male and female, during the eighties. The hard rock music that coalesced in the early 1970s and remained popular into the 1980s got influenced by punk in the late seventies and was declared to be in revival beginning in 1979, when a few such groups turned to the sound's early 70s roots and donned Kiss-style platform boots, the best known being early 80s Mötley Crüe and Wrathchild. Wrathchild emphasized the early-seventies-revival focus by titling a 1983 recording Stackheel Strutt. This was all kind of subcultural, though, not really seen among the mainstream populace, who continued to view the seventies as laughably out of style.

In the mid-eighties, a small group of avant-gardists located in London began to play with ideas of bad taste by reviving styles from the early seventies, including platform shoes, with club denizens like Leigh Bowery and Michael Clark wearing repurposed early-seventies platforms and shoe designer Patrick Cox outfitting the collections of avant-garde designers like John Galliano in occasional platformed footwear. BodyMap and Vivienne Westwood showed them as well, as did a few avant-garde designers in Paris like Adeline Andre. In line with the silhouettes of the eighties, many of these platforms were tapered rather than being blocky or flared as many had been in the early seventies.

Fashion journalist William Grimes and buyers at New York's Patricia Field boutique dated the first stirrings of a more widespread platform revival among New York's trendy to 1987. The mid-eighties early seventies revival seen among London's avant-garde would expand in 1988 and '89 to become more mainstream, especially in mass dance club culture with the burgeoning acid house/rave phenomenon. Elements of early seventies fashion like hot pants, smiley face symbols, and the occasional vintage platform shoe spread from London trendies to more mainstream dance clubs and dance parties in urban areas. During the closing years of the decade, avant-garde designers like Vivienne Westwood, Jean-Paul Gaultier, and Marc Audibet showed more platforms; Thierry Mugler occasionally incorporated them into his high-glamour, femme fatale looks; and a few platform shoes were beginning to be seen again even in the collections of more sedate designers like Jean Muir.

One of the first recorded instances of a runway model falling off a catwalk due to platform shoes was when Jean-Paul Gaultier model Dianne Brill fell at a 1988 Gaultier show, a phenomenon that would become more familiar as designers presented more ungainly platforms during the following decade.

By the end of the 1980s, Doc Martens were becoming mainstream popular, with designers like Patrick Cox and Lionel Cros producing altered versions of Doc Martens and similar work shoes as early as the mid-1980s. Their thick soles weren't usually thought of as platforms at the time, but one of the major 1980s promoters of Doc Martens, shoe designer John Fluevog, was working on combining the clunkiness and bumpy toes of Doc Martens with early-seventies-revival platform shoe ideas to produce what would become one of the most publicized platform styles of the early years of the 1990s.

===== 1990s =====
Shoe designer John Fluevog's "Munster" platform shoe, conceived of in 1989, would receive wide exposure in 1990. It was a cartoonish-looking shoe with a somewhat 18th-century-looking, front-buckled upper on a blocky, sculptural, slightly flared, medium-high platform sole and high, exaggeratedly shaped Louis heel, initially in black but soon offered in an array of colors and patterns. Singer Lady Miss Kier of Deee-Lite wore a pair on the cover of their popular first album in 1990 and in the video for their huge hit "Groove is in the Heart," which also featured a couple of other platform shoe styles among a melange of 60s-revival, 70s-revival, and hiphop looks and sounds, major trends of the period. The following year, popular singer Madonna wore them in her tour film Truth or Dare, alongside avant-garde outfits from Jean-Paul Gaultier.

Less garish platform shoes were also part of the seventies-revival looks of the time, as more mainstream fashion followers in London, Paris, and other cities took to wearing platforms as everyday streetwear, still often in eighties black and still often influenced by work shoes. The seventies revival saw blocky but comfortable platforms in natural materials. There was also playful footwear like platform sneakers.

Vivienne Westwood, the UK fashion designer, continued to show platform shoes into the early 1990s. She had started showing platforms in the mid-eighties, her soles then often high but the heels innocently low, but by late 1991 she favored a sort of caricatured, fetish-influenced streetwalker look with soaring rocker platforms paired with towering, strongly shaped high heels. The heel was often elevated four inches above the ball of the foot above very high platforms, causing runway models to totter with each step. It was while wearing a pair of Westwood Super-Elevated Ghillies with five-inch platforms and nine-inch heels that supermodel Naomi Campbell fell on the catwalk at a fashion show. Such impractically high, often stilleto heels and platforms became a minor runway phenomenon during the first half of the decade, with designers like Pam Hogg and Tracy Feith forcing their models into them and audiences holding their breaths as the mannequins teetered along the catwalk. Understandably, these did not catch on with the public, though some designers would continue to show such things into the 21st century, when they would get even more exaggerated and even become popular with certain celebrities.

While women's platform shoes were becoming more popular during the 1990s, men's platforms did not become everyday wear again, limited this time to small groups of fashion-obsessed club kids and a very few rock musicians participating in the era's seventies revival. An example can be seen in Lenny Kravitz's video for his hit 1993 seventies-revival song "Are You Gonna Go My Way?," in which Kravitz, who was obsessed with late sixties and early seventies styles and sounds at that time, plays a 1970s-style flying-V guitar while wearing a 1969-style maxi-vest, flared trousers, and platform shoes. By 1996, the revival of seventies styles had become so widespread that seventies male rock group Kiss resumed wearing their glam rock-era stage makeup and platform boots, but there was no corresponding adoption of platform shoes by men on the street as there had been in the first half of the 1970s.

Platform shoes only began to resurface in more mainstream fashion in the late 1990s, thanks in part to the UK singing group the Spice Girls. The all-girl group was often seen in tall platform sneakers and boots. The footwear brand Buffalo created the famous platform sneakers worn by members of the group.

The United Kingdom (and European) experience of platform shoes was somewhat different from that of the United States. The long, pointed shoes of the early 2000s, giving an elongated look to the foot, have been more popular in the US than in the UK.

==== 21st century ====
===== 2000s =====
The platform shoe resurfaced in popularity in the early 2000s when the YSL Tribute Sandal appeared in 2004, quickly gaining popularity by celebrities and the fashion world for its sex appeal and added comfort of a platform sole. The shoe is continued to be released season after season, despite changes in creative directors.

===== 2010s =====
During the late 2010s, platform boots became fashionable due to a resurgence of interest in 1970s fashion. These included so-called "nothing shoes" with clear Perspex soles, and mule sandals.

== Notable wearers ==
- Gary Glitter
- James Brown
- Dani Filth of gothic rock band Cradle of Filth
- Lady Gaga wears platform shoes out in public as well for concerts and performances.
- Spice Girls
- Ariana Grande
- Elton John has a large collection of platform shoes, many of which were sold at auction for charity.
- Lady Miss Kier
- Richard Kruspe of industrial metal band Rammstein
- Marilyn Manson wore platform boots on the Mechanical Animals promo, Grotesk Burlesk, and Rock Is Dead tours. For live performances, the prominent wearers were Manson, Skold, John 5, and Pogo.
- Carmen Miranda
- Stevie Nicks of Fleetwood Mac
- Simon Rimmer wears platform shoes at all times due to his different length legs.
- Veruca Salt
- Gene Simmons from Kiss
- Courtney Stodden
- Charli XCX
- Sabrina Carpenter

== Photo gallery ==
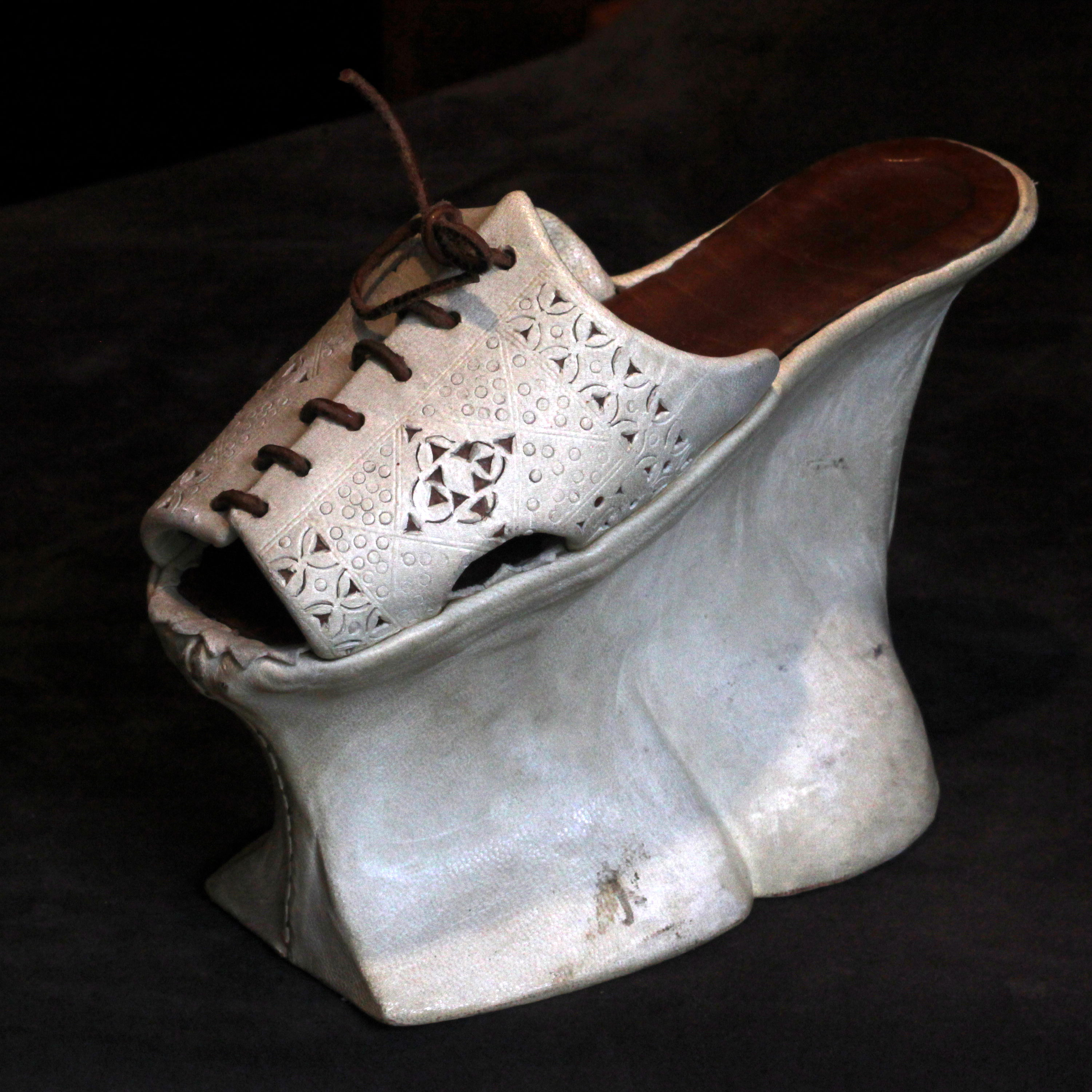
Reconstruction of a 16th-century Venetian chopine. On display at the Shoe Museum in Lausanne.

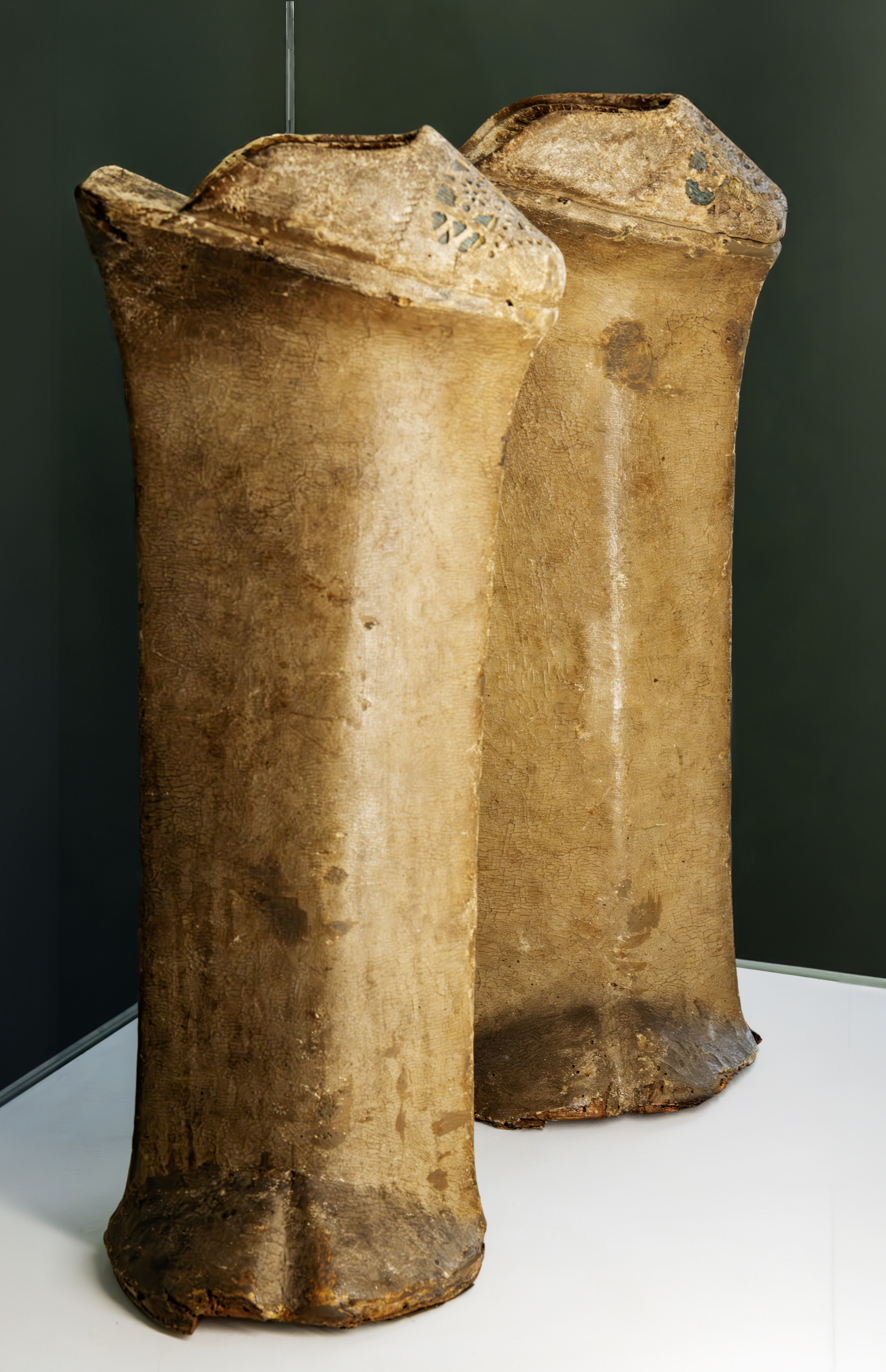
Calcagnetti (Chopine) - Museo Correr

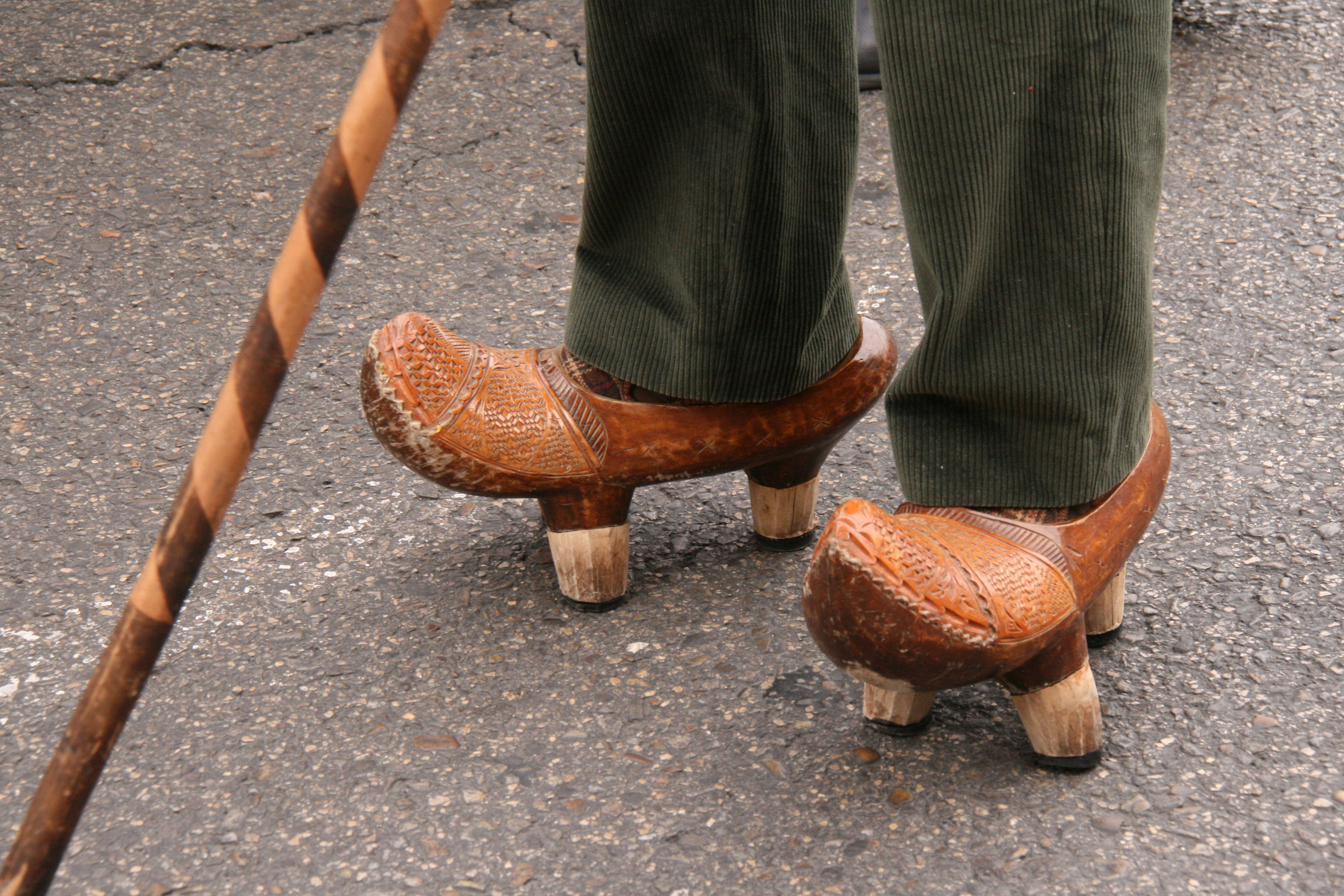
A cantabrian albarcas is a rustic wooden shoe in one piece, which has been used particularly by the peasants of Cantabria, northern Spain.

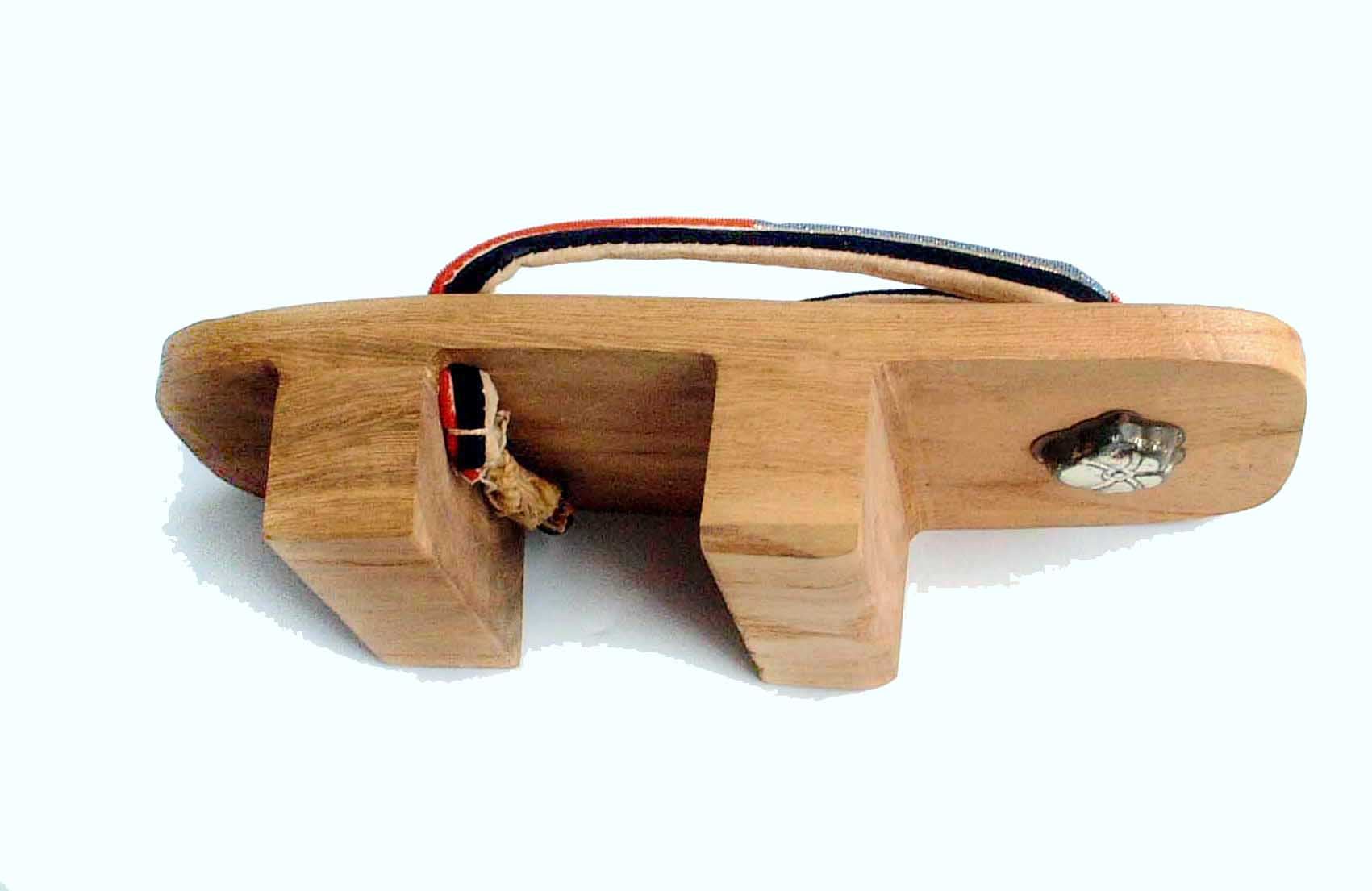
The bottom view, showing the "teeth" of Geta

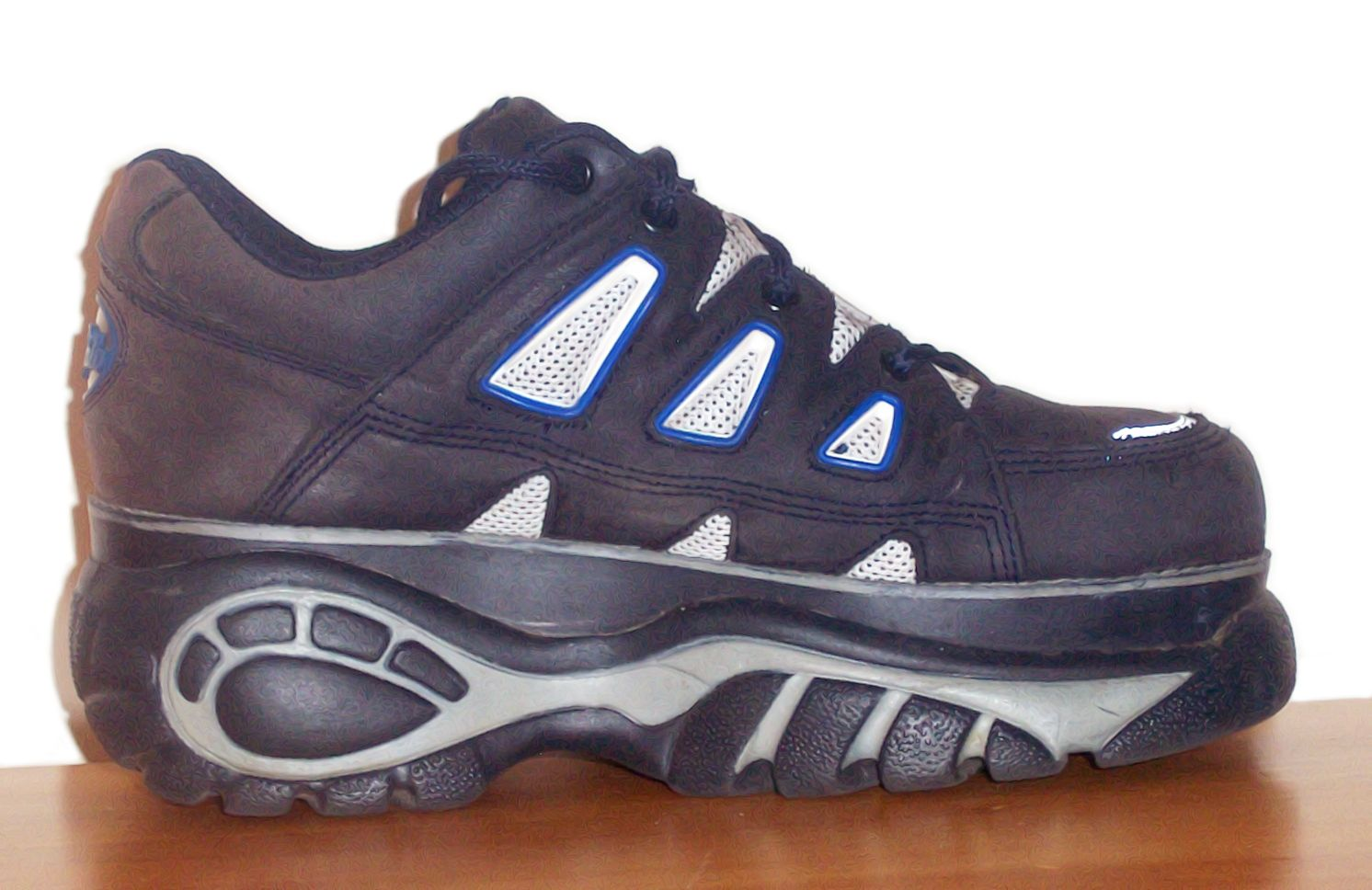
Buffalo platform trainer

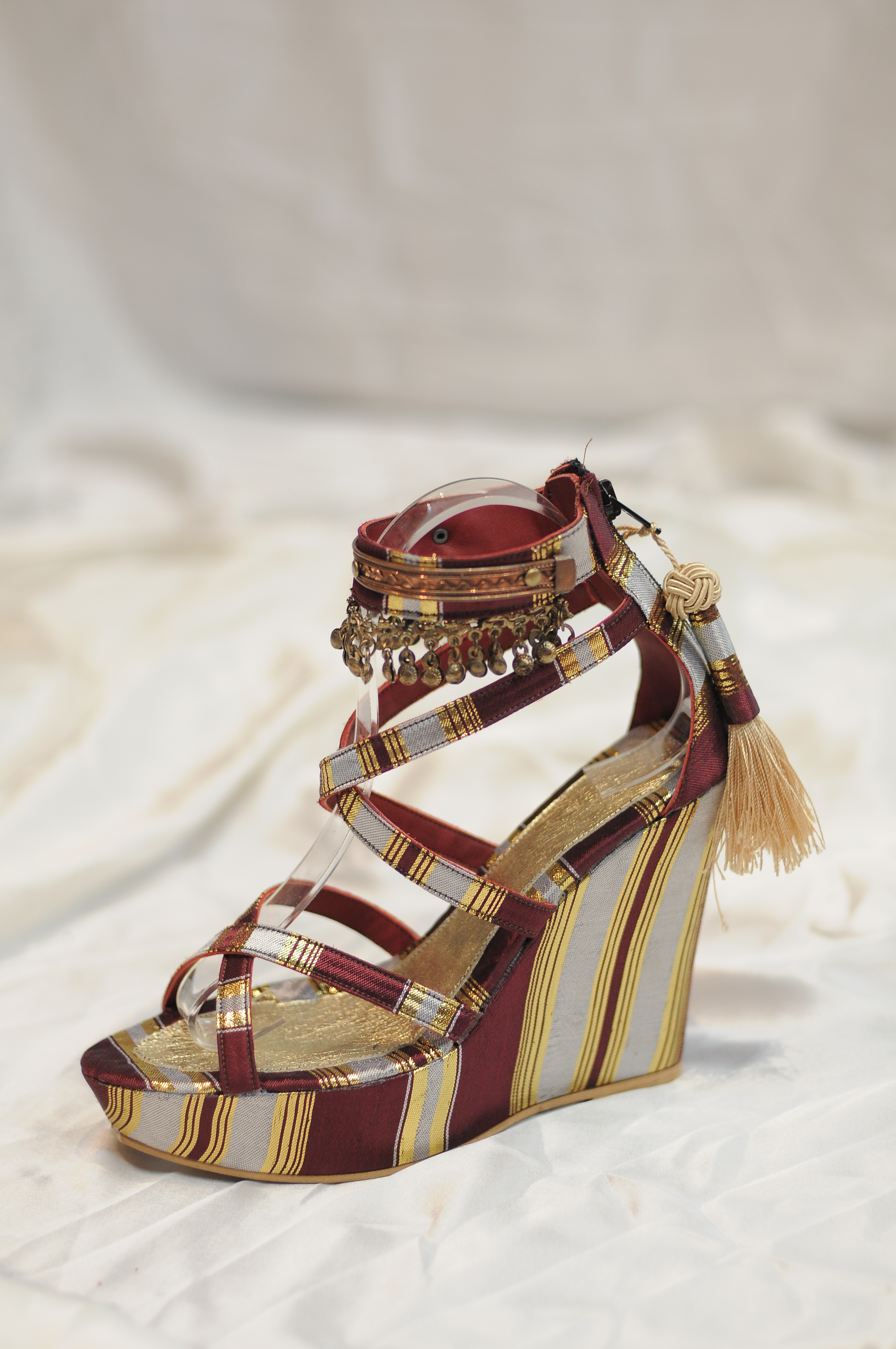
An example of a high wedge-heeled sandal

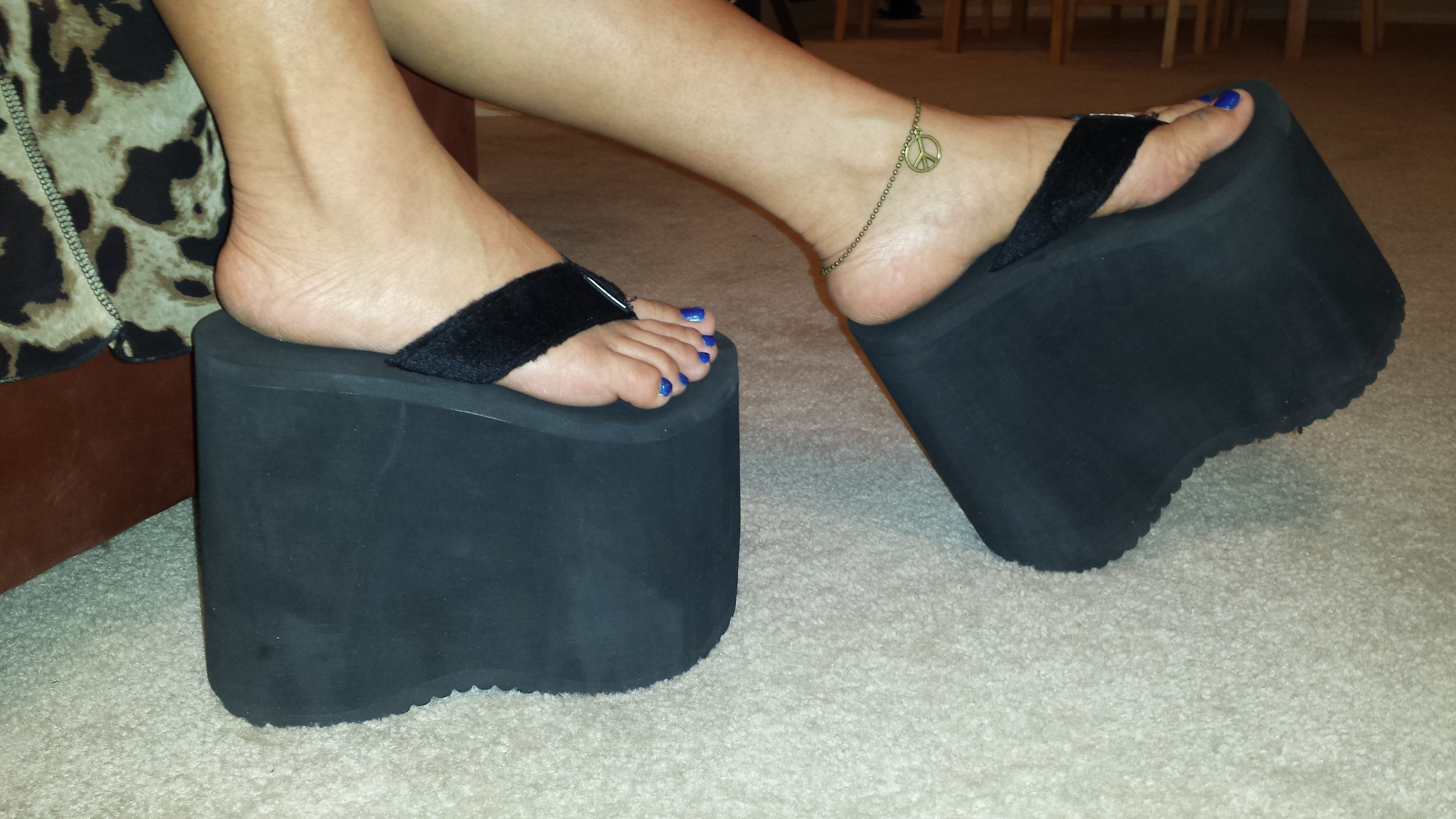
Seven inch platform flip flops

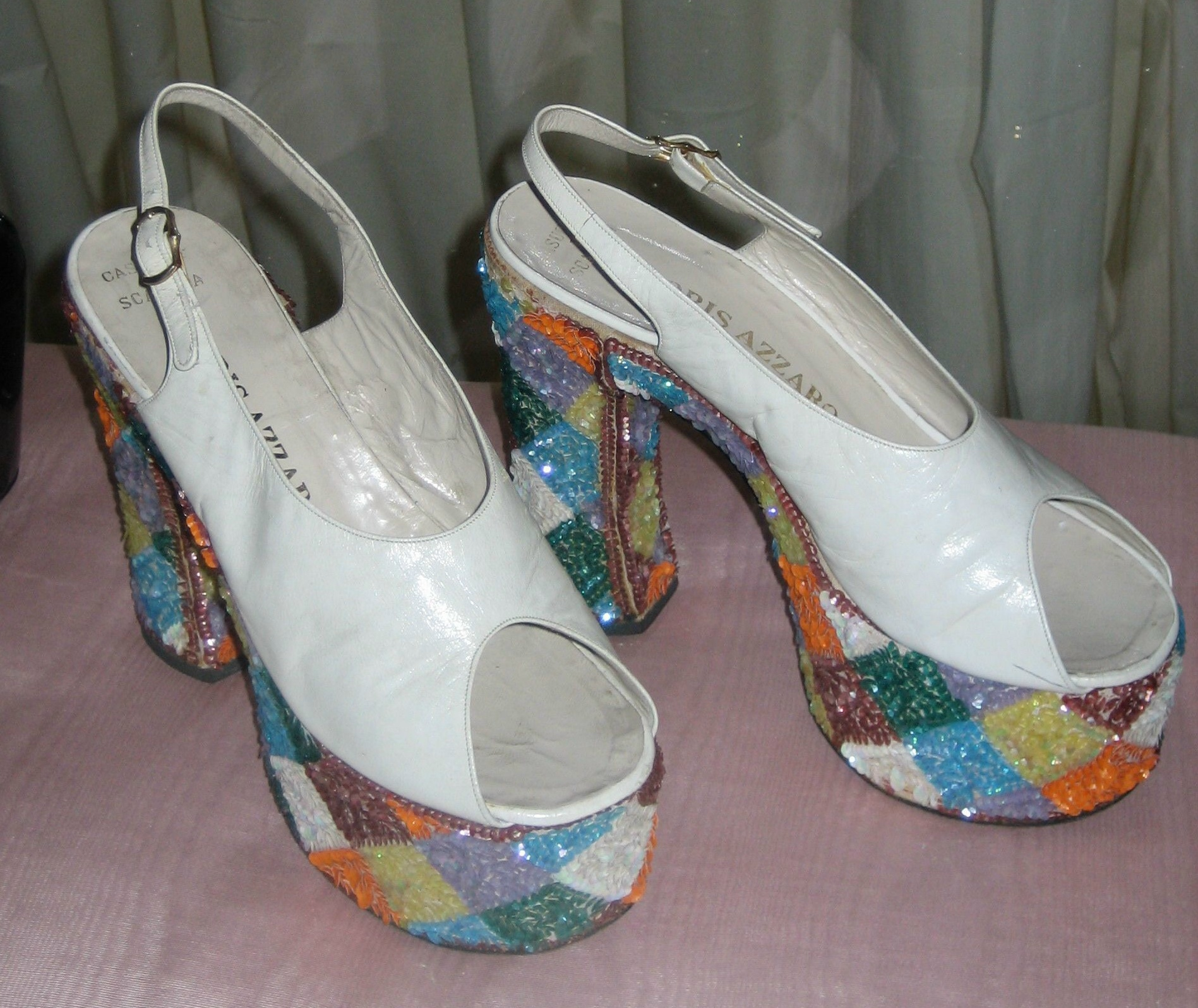
Azzaro

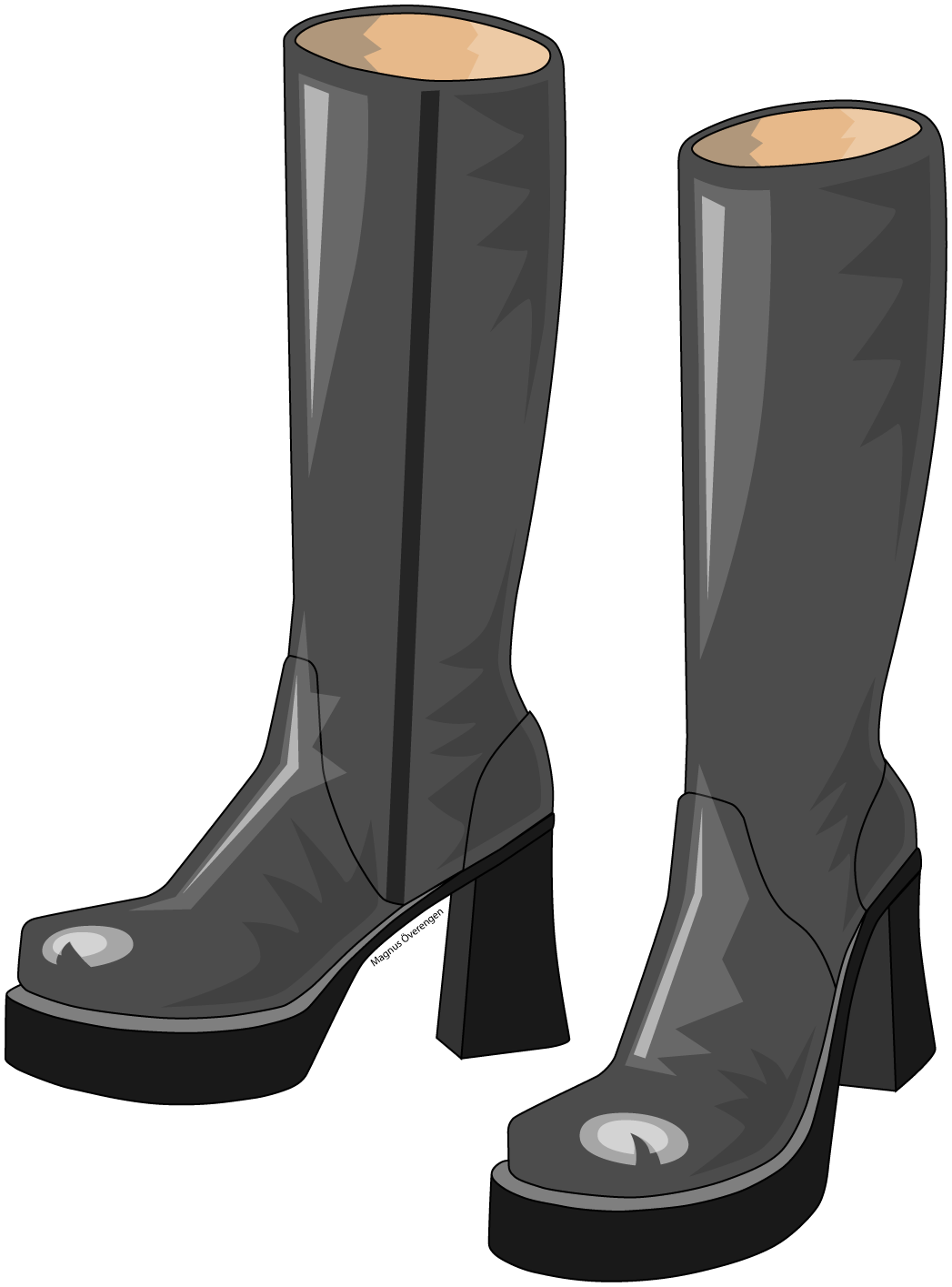
Platform boots

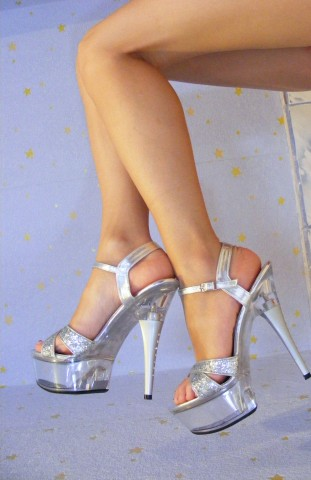
High-heeled platform shoes

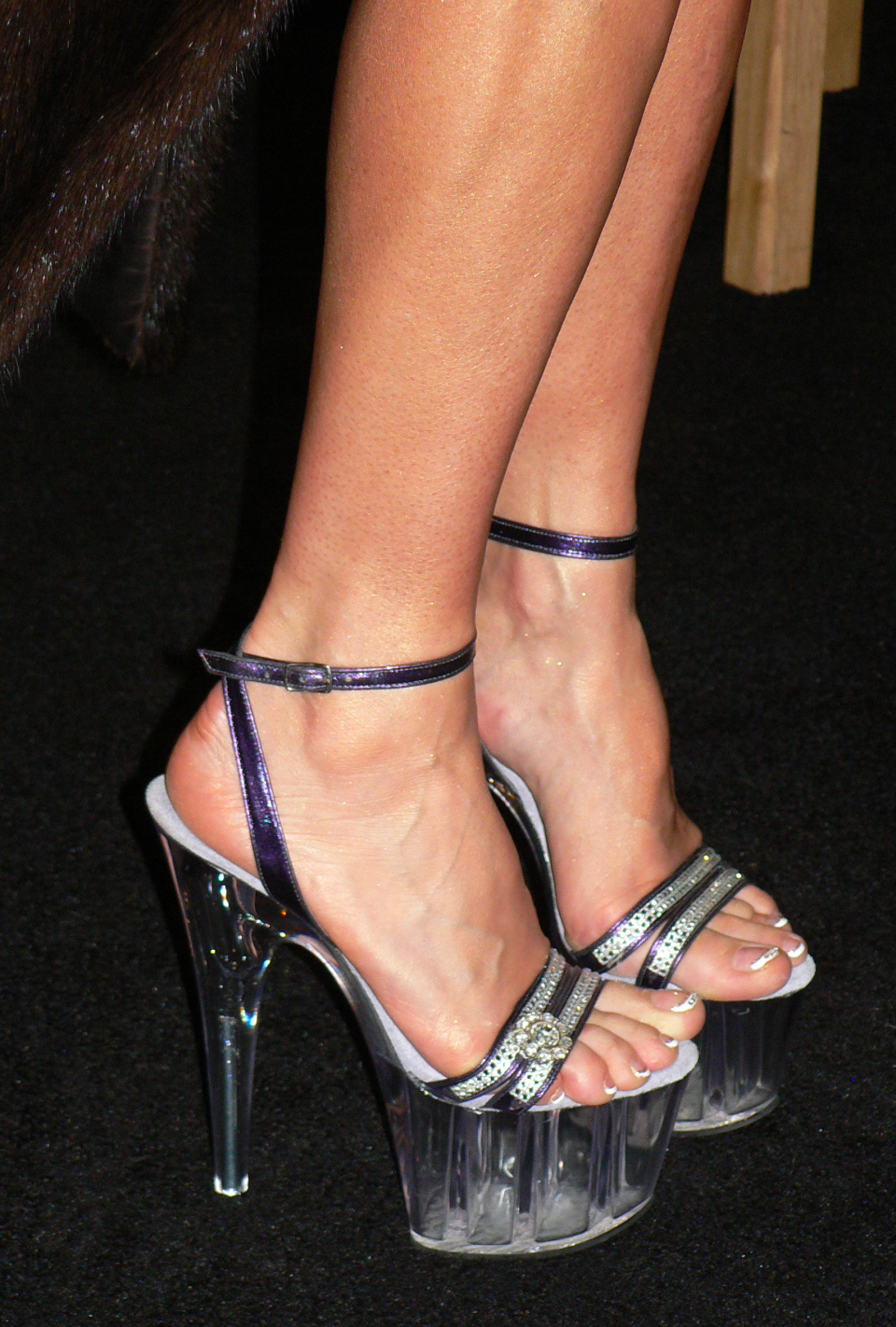
Acrylic high-heeled platform shoes

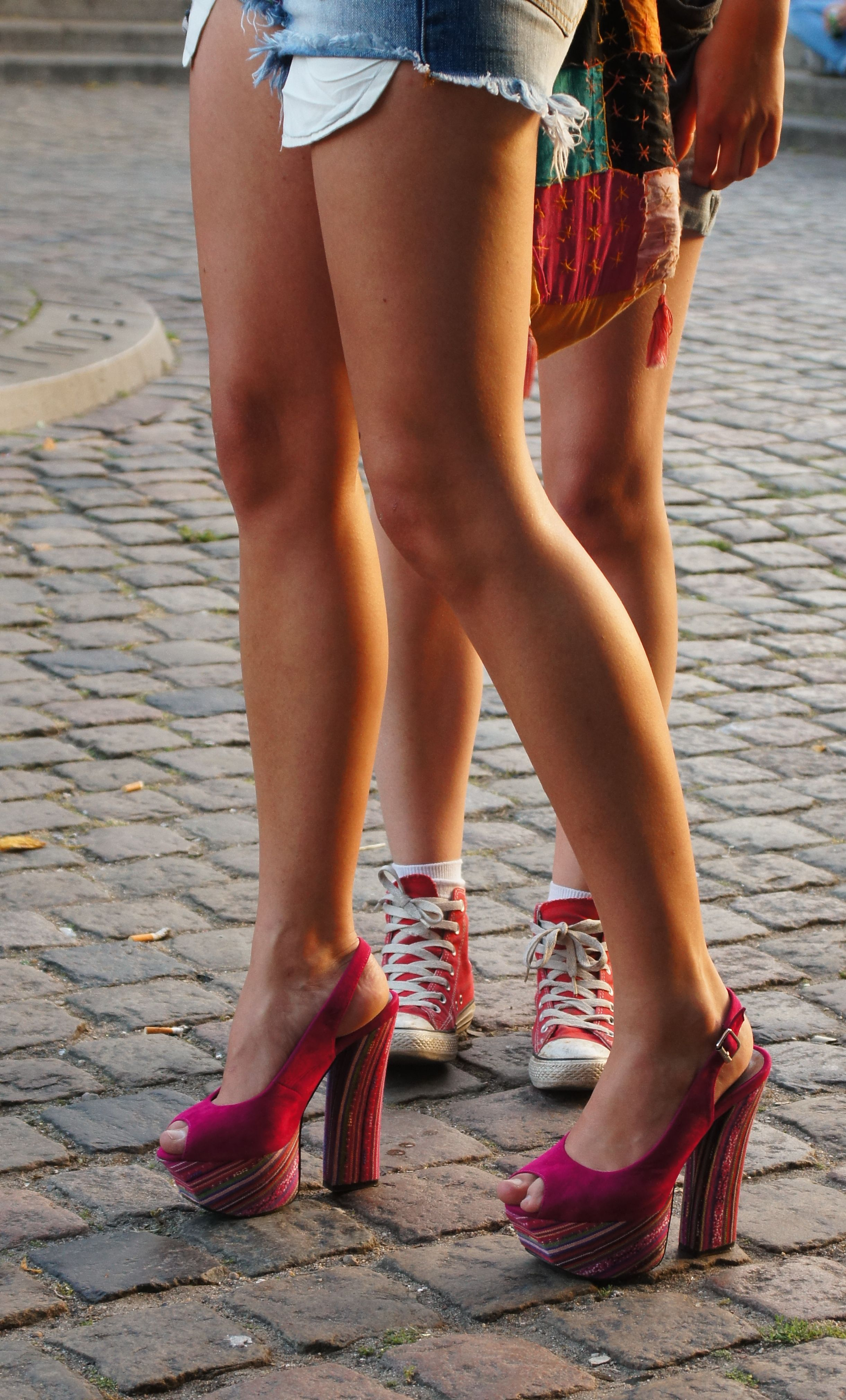
High-heeled platform shoes

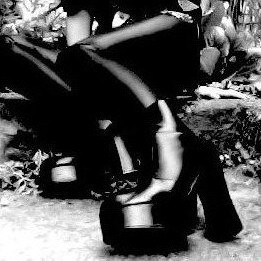

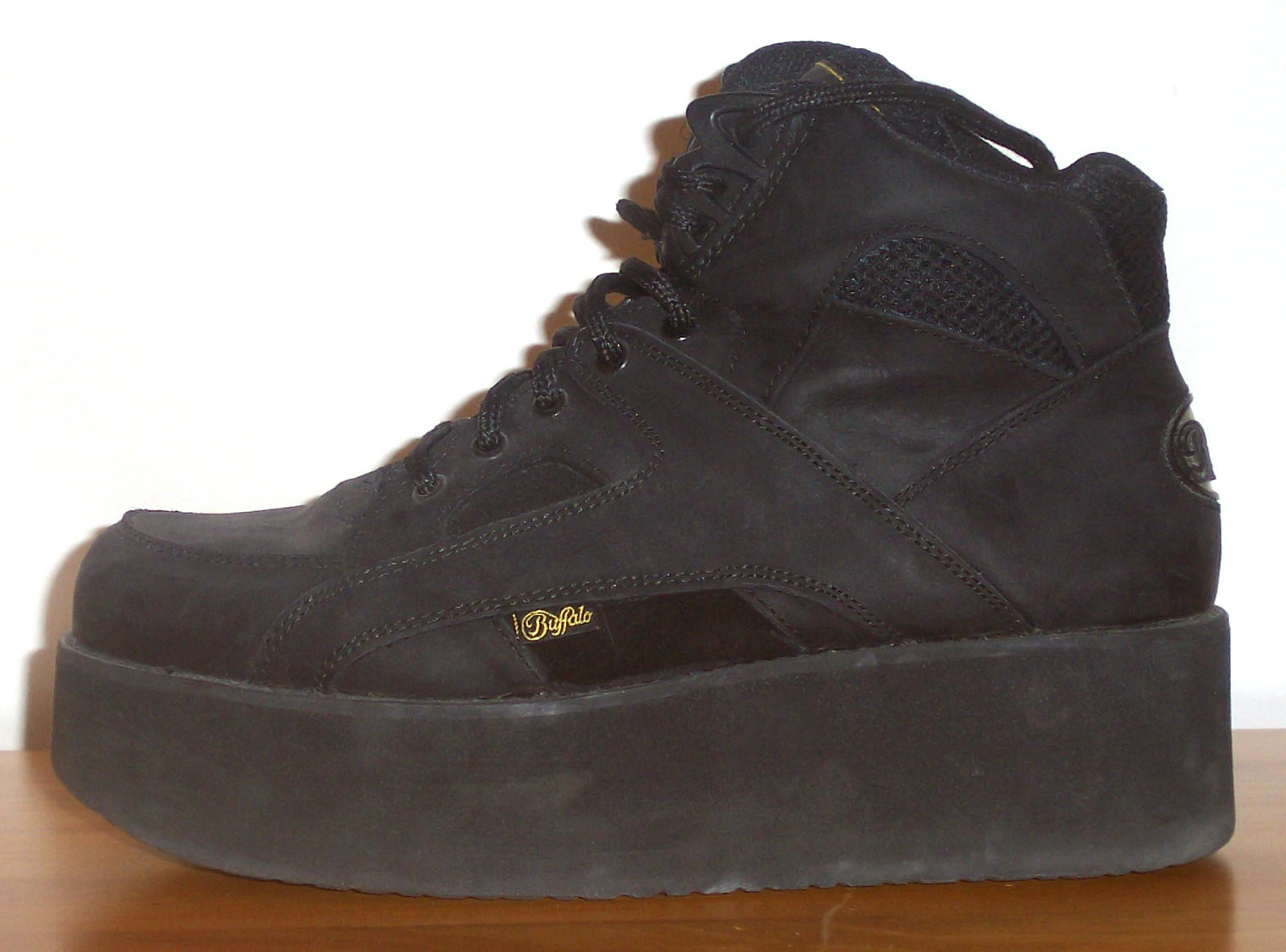
Buffalo Boots

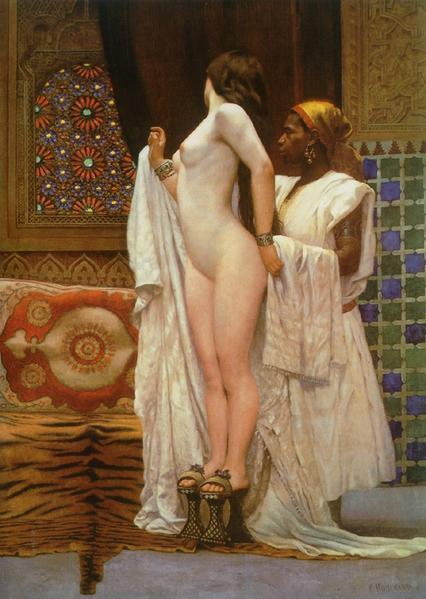
1894 painting of a woman wearing platform shoes

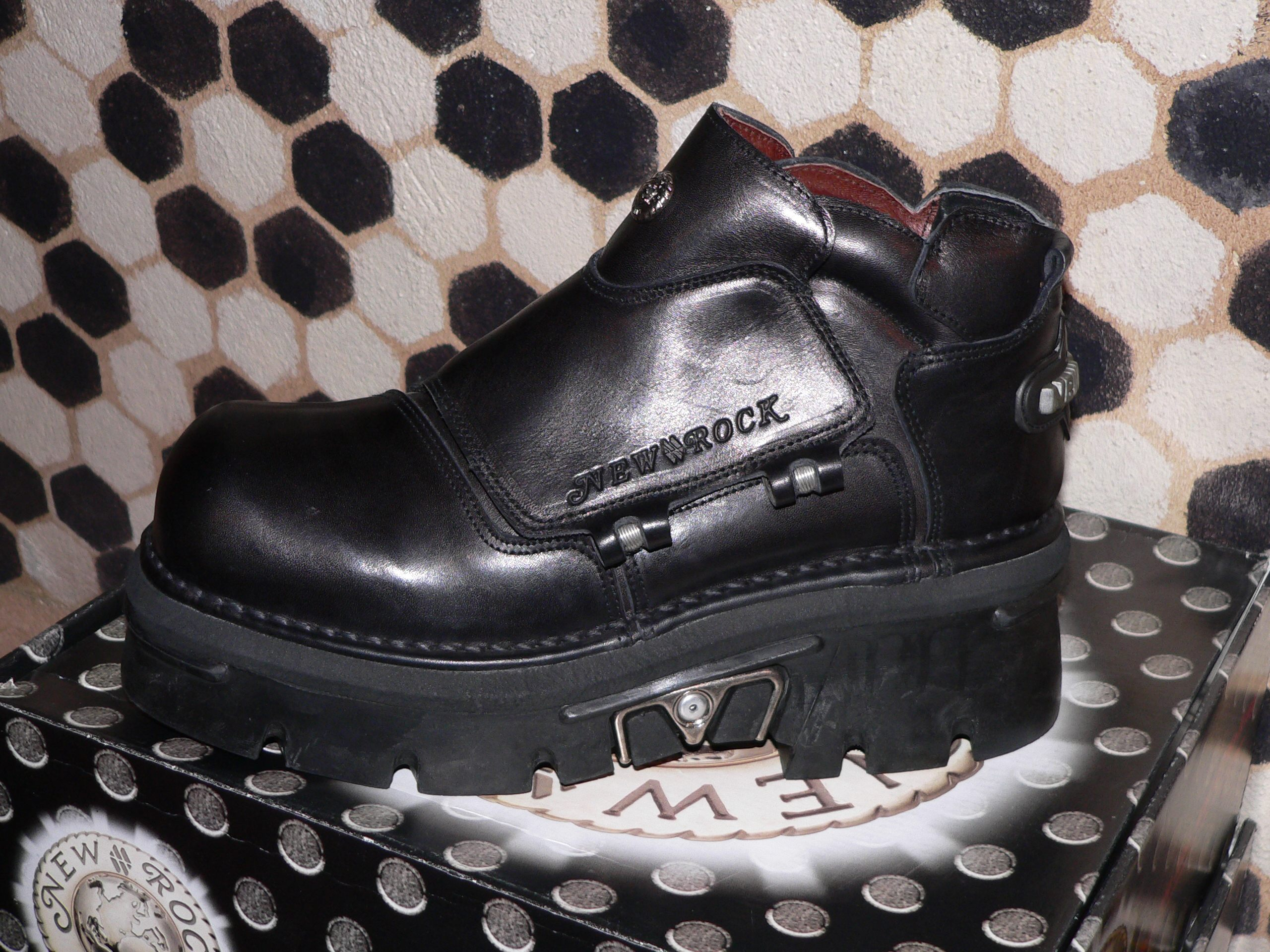
New Rock platform shoes

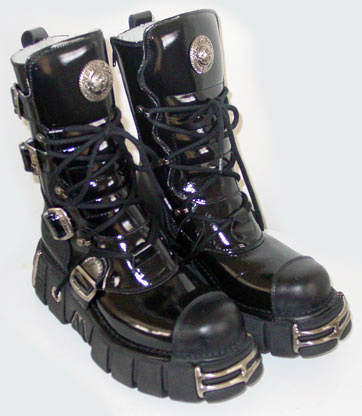
New Rock platform boots

== See also ==
- Elevator shoes
- High-heeled footwear
- List of boots
- List of shoe styles
