= Yeffe Kimball =

Painter from Oklahoma, U.S.

- Born: Effie Violetta Goodman; March 30, 1906; Rayville, Missouri, U.S.
- Died: April 11, 1978 (aged 72); Santa Fe, New Mexico, U.S.
- Education: Art Students League of New York
- Known for: Painting, pretendianism, paintings of burning planets
- Style: Abstract Expressionism
- Spouse(s): Herman Delman (m. c 1936 - div. c 1945); Harvey L. Slatin (m. 1948–)

Yeffe Kimball (born Effie Violetta Goodman; March 30, 1906 – April 11, 1978) was an American painter known for her abstract modernist work with Native American and space exploration subjects. Kimball created work under an assumed Osage Indian identity, rising to prominence after her admittance of the painting Sacred Buffalo into the Philbrook Museum of Art's first Indian Annual in Tulsa, Oklahoma, in 1946.

== Biography ==
Born Effie Violetta Goodman to white parents, Oather Alvis Goodman and Martha Clementine Smith on March 30, 1906, her residence in 1910 was Rayville, Missouri. Kimball claimed to have been born in 1914 in Mountain Park, Oklahoma. Kimball was the fourth of at least nine children.

Kimball's last name is the result of her first (annulled) marriage, to a man named Campbell, which likely enabled her to erase her previous identity. Kimball cited a fabricated background of an Osage father known as “Other Good-Man” or “Other Good-Man Smith”, but there are no Osage records that exist to support this claim. Furthermore, there are no reservation records that show any type of Native American ancestry in Kimball's family. This assumed identity and cultural appropriation brought her great success as a Native American artist. Kimball married Harvey L. Slatin, an atomic scientist, in 1948. Slatin's work influenced Kimball's work, evident in her “fused earth” work from the 1960s.

== Education and career ==
Kimball's work is known for its Western modernist style and focus on Native American subjects and themes. While many mid-20th century American Indian painters used water-based paints, such as casein and distemper, Kimball mostly painted in oil.

Early references claim that Kimball studied at the University of Oklahoma in the 1930s. Lacking sufficient evidence to support this, as the university has no records documenting her attendance, it instead appears that Kimball was a designer for a Kansas City department store before she moved to New York City with her second husband to start her art career in 1935. Kimball studied at the Arts Student League in New York City from 1935 to 1939, traveling abroad to Europe to do independent studies in France and Italy. In Europe, she discovered African art, which influenced her study of Native American painting and traditions.

The national Philbrook Indian Annual exhibition accepted entries from Native Americans all over the United States that created work based on Native themes and drew attention as Native American painting was rising in popularity post-World War II. Kimball's first entry into the exhibition in 1946, Sacred Buffalo, was accepted into the show, but did not win awards and was not purchased by the museum. Her entry the following year, To the Happy Hunting Ground, won her an honorable mention in the Plains region category from the juror. This painting cemented Kimball's career in Native art, securing her future entries in the Annual Philbrook exhibition and as a supposed Native artist.

Kimball exhibited work in more than one hundred shows in galleries and museums between 1942 and 1965. Around 60 of the numerous shows she was in over her career were solo exhibitions around the United States and Europe. The National Academy of Design, the Whitney Museum, and the Carnegie Institute, as well as being the first woman to have work displayed in the NASA art collection, are among her major exhibitions in the United States.

Yeffe Kimball established herself as a writer and critic of Native American art. She reviewed the 1946 and 1947 Philbrook Indian Annuals for Art Digest, a New York Publication. Kimball also illustrated The Story of the Totem Pole in 1949 and The Pueblo Indians in Story, Song, and Dance in 1955, both children's books focused on Indian legends. In 1965, she co-authored and illustrated a cookbook with Jean Anderson titled The Art of American Indian Cooking.

== Native American advocacy ==
Kimball was engaged in Native American political activism in the later part of her life, working on Native-run committees for the Department of the Interior that supported political, educational, and cultural Native American groups throughout the 1950s up until the late 1970s. Kimball organized art auctions to raise money for Native American causes, and worked with the U.S. State Department to choose objects that were displayed in an international exhibition of Native American art in 1953. Several of the organizations she worked for and founded, such as Arrow, worked to support Native American youth, education, arts, and health.

== Death and legacy ==
Kimball died in her vacation home in Santa Fe, New Mexico, on April 11, 1978, from cancer.

Much of Kimball's work is now housed in publicly funded institutions, further complicating the significance and historical meaning and value of her artwork. The Department of the Interior with which she worked for collected ninety-five of her pieces, including paintings, prints, and drawings, along with some of her other personal Native American and art-related belongings. Other artwork was donated to or given by Kimball to the Institute of American Indian Arts in Santa Fe. This institution collected nine of her paintings along with a large sum of ethnographic photographs that she took in the 1950s.

During Kimball's career, art was a male-dominated field in which it was difficult or impossible for a woman's career to develop. Bill Anthes states, “Indianness provided Kimball with a position of strength on which to build a career, and she styled herself as the exotic curiosity of being an Indian in New York as well as a rising star in the Indian exhibitions of the West”. Kimball's fabricated identity was widely believed to be true and cited by both Native and non-Native audiences. Some in the postwar Native American art world were aware of Kimball's charade, such as Frederick J. Dockstader, director of the Museum of the American Indian, Heye Foundation. Despite this knowledge, he and a few others felt that Kimball's dedication to Native American rights and advocacy justified her false identity because it indicated her sincere connection to Indian culture.
