= Harvey L. Slatin =

Physicist and inventor

- Born: June 17, 1915; New York City, US
- Died: February 23, 2013 (aged 97); Stamford, New York, US
- Education: Cornell University
- Spouse(s): Yeffe Kimball (1948–1978); Anne Pratt Slatin (1979-Death)
- Children: Emily Pratt Slatin
- Scientific career
- Doctoral advisor: Robert J. Oppenheimer

Harvey L. Slatin (June 17, 1915 - February 23, 2013) was an American physicist and inventor. He was the 23rd scientist recruited to work on the Manhattan Project at Los Alamos, New Mexico in 1942. He worked on the isolation of plutonium. He was the last surviving member of his Special Engineering Detachment (SED) relating to the Manhattan Project.

== Career ==
In his work as an inventor, he held various patents relating to electroplating processes, such as the process for the electrolytic production of metals, for the preparation of pure metals from their compounds. One of his patents includes a patent for a method of producing lithium. He is the inventor on a patent relating to electrolysis of rare-earth elements and Yttrium.

Slatin received a full scholarship to Cornell University. He graduated in 1937 with a degree in chemical engineering. He earned his PhD at the University of California at Berkeley in nuclear physics. His faculty adviser was Robert J. Oppenheimer. A top security clearance was required to read his doctoral dissertation.

== Personal life ==
Slatin was married to Yeffe Kimball in his first marriage. He and Yeffe Kimble worked on a photography project in the 1950s to honor Native Americans in the Southwest region of the United States. Some of the photographs can be found in the Indian Museum in Santa Fe, New Mexico. She predeceased him in 1978. He then married Anne Katherine Pratt. They had one daughter, Emily Pratt Slatin, a photographer and writer, who specializes in urban exploration photography. Slatin was a supporter of Friends of Music, located in Stamford, New York. He was a longtime vice-president of the organization and served on the board of directors.
