= Roger Vivier =

French shoe designer (1907–1998)

- Born: Roger Vivier; 13 November 1907
- Died: 2 October 1998 (aged 90)
- Employer(s): Christian Dior SE, Yves Saint Laurent, Delman
- Known for: Designing for Queen Elizabeth II for her Coronation

Roger Henri Vivier (13 November 1907 – 2 October 1998) was a French fashion designer who specialized in shoes. He is best known for creating the modern day stiletto heel and for placing a chrome-plated buckle on an elegant black pump, which became a must-have fashion statement for many celebrities and stars in the 1950s and 1960s. His namesake label is Roger Vivier.

== Early life and education ==
Orphaned at the age of nine, Vivier studied sculpture at the École des Beaux-Arts in Paris and his compositions exhibited the concern for form and texture characteristic of a sculptor.

== Career ==
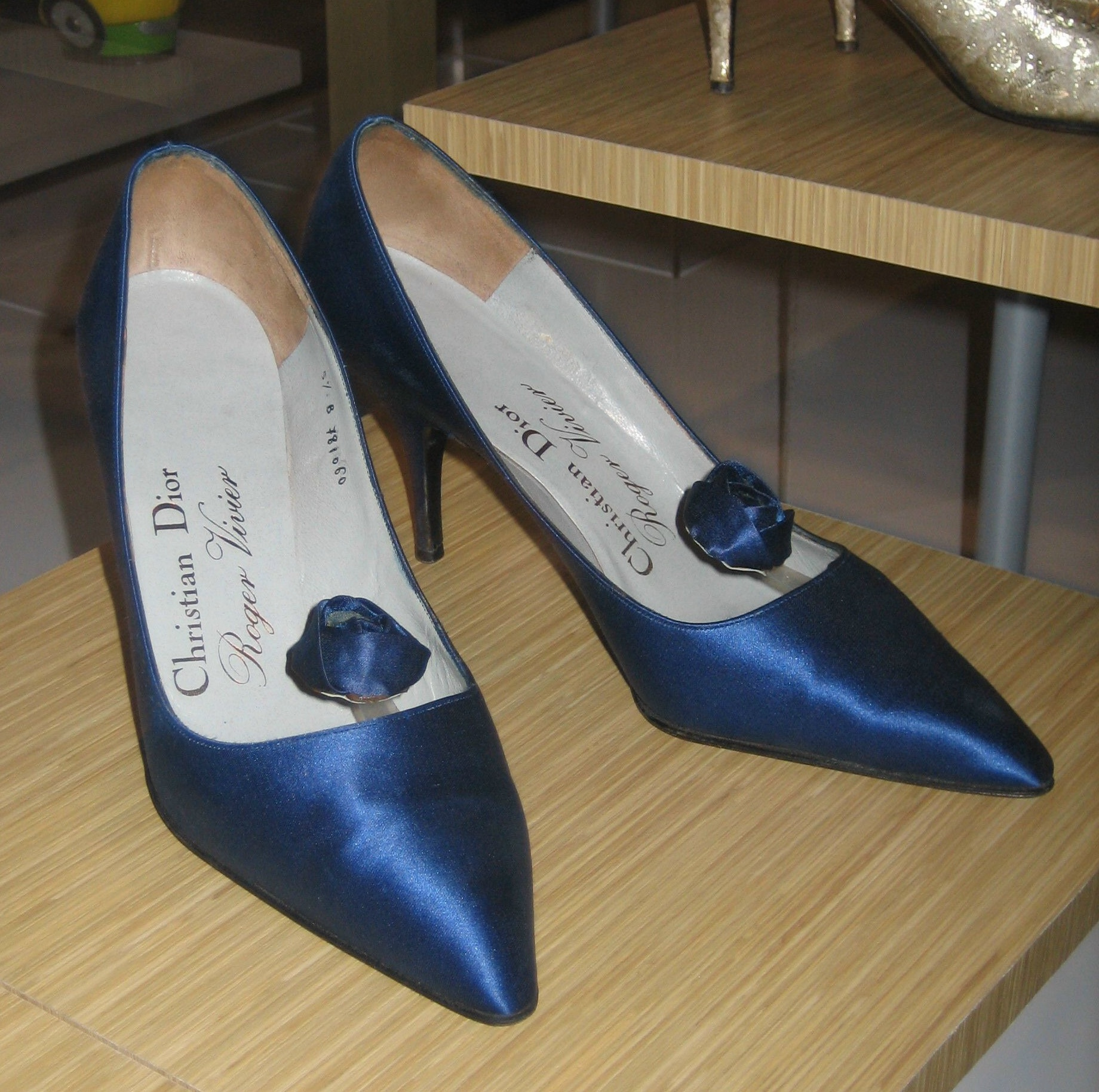
Shoes by Vivier for Christian Dior

Vivier has been called the "Fragonard of the shoe" and his shoes "the Fabergé of Footwear" by numbers of critics. He designed extravagant, richly decorated shoes that he described as sculptures.

Vivier sketched his first shoe design in 1917 when he was just ten years old, impressing a family friend who owned a shoe factory. Years later at the École des Beaux-Arts while studying sculpture, an apprenticeship manufacturing shoes introduced him to professional shoe design and production and soon after graduating he was designing shoes for a number of European and US companies, including Bally and Delman.

After opening his own house in Paris in 1937, he continued to produce designs for Delman, maintaining a relationship that would last through 1962. Many of his designs of the 1930s and '40s were very sculptural and creative interpretations of the era's platform soles, which often included the wedge heels that had been introduced by Ferragamo in 1937. The first couturier to use Vivier footwear was Schiaparelli in 1937, who accepted a pair of Chinese-influenced Vivier platforms that Delman had rejected. During the Second World War, while exiled in New York, he made hats. At the end of the 1940s, he was designing a range of pumps, sandals, and ankle boots in creative combinations of materials and trim as Paris designer for Delman.

He continued designing for Delman as the fifties dawned, generally following the trend toward tapered pumps. Perugia was the most prominent shoe designer with couturiers at the time, but after Christian Dior switched from Perugia to Delman in 1952-53, Vivier's stature grew and by the end of the decade he was considered the most innovative and influential shoe designer in fashion. Notable designs of his from the first half of the decade included pumps incorporating transparent plastic in 1951, presaging his more extensive use of transparent plastic in the mid-1960s; shoes with stiletto heels with the top of the heel inset from the back of the foot bed in 1953; and high heels tipped with detachable, interchangeable spheres to coordinate with different outfits in 1955.

Vivier designed shoes under contract with the house of Christian Dior from 1953 to 1963. The two designers worked very closely together, with Dior sometimes conceiving of ensembles based on Vivier's footwear. Delman had been the springboard for this collaboration and Vivier shoes from this period usually contain the label Delman-Dior or Dior-Delman.

In 1954, he created what we now think of as the modern stiletto heel. Stiletto heels, the very thin high heel, were invented in the late 19th century, as numerous fetish drawings attest, but Vivier is known for reviving and developing this opulent style by using a thin rod of steel, carrying further similar uses of metal for heels undertaken by other designers during the early fifties, including Perugia, who produced sliver-thin metal heels as early as 1951. The same internal girding supported Vivier's Aiguille (needle) heels and Choc (shock) heels of 1955. In addition to the stiletto heel, he also experimented with other shapes, including the Comma (inventing the “virgule” heel) in 1959. He used silk, pearls, beads, lace, appliqué and jewels to create unique decorations for his shoes.

In the second half of the fifties, Vivier was known for favoring low heels and squaring the tips of the long, tapered toes that were the norm at the time, initiating trends that would become more pronounced and characteristic of the shoes of the early to mid-1960s. He introduced the lowered heel in 1956, initially to harmonize with the longer skirts in Dior's fall 1956 Aimant collection. He continued with the lowered heel the following year, when Dior raised his skirts to the knee. Low heels would remain Vivier's major focus through the mid-1960s. His expertly sculpted, delicate-looking low heels of the late fifties were intended to give a slight impression of height even when very low.

He introduced the squared-off toe tip in 1957, referring to the shoe last for it as Mandolin in 1958, when he also produced a cleft-toed variant he named Guitar. Fashion writers sometimes referred to these late fifties/early sixties squared-off toe tips as chisel toes. Though introduced in 1957, they wouldn't become mainstream popular until 1961. He also produced other unusual sculpted toe tips. In 1959, he produced a toe tip with the top of the end concave for a scooped-out effect, as well as a pump where the outer side of the toe box was geometrically shaped into a flat plane.

In the early 1960s, he continued with squared-off toes and low heels but moved toward wider, rounded toes and thicker but still low heels by 1963, influencing the era's footwear trends. His style remained very sculptural. In 1960 and '61, he presented some wider, wedge-shaped toes for both day and eveningwear, while continuing to produce more familiar pointed toes and stiletto heels. He introduced the Twist heel in 1962 and the Hurricane heel in 1963, the former a heel that looked wide from the back but narrow from the side, the latter a variation of his late-fifties Comma or Parenthesis heel. Vivier and Delman ended their partnership in 1962, capping off over a quarter-century of collaboration that had begun when Vivier was just out of university.

Vivier was best known in the 1960s for his work with Yves Saint Laurent, which he seemed to find uniquely inspiring, but he also designed for a number of other houses, sometimes eight or nine in a season. These included Pierre Balmain, Guy Laroche, Nina Ricci, Grès, Venet, Ungaro, Simonetta e Fabiani, Jean-Marie Armand, and Jacques Tiffeau. Though he had ended his contract with Dior in 1963, Vivier made shoes for Marc Bohan of Dior off and on throughout the decade.

A low-heeled, round-toed, black patent leather pump with a square metal buckle was a best seller for him in 1964 and it would be modified slightly for Yves Saint Laurent's 1965 Mondrian collection, an iconic association that would further popularize it. He would make variations of this style for a couple of years thereafter. In 1966, the year that Space Age influence peaked in fashion, he would focus on low-heeled, round-toed shoes and boots in transparent plastic and metallic silver.

Women's boots came to the fore in the 1960s and Vivier's were some of the best, ranging in height from ankle to waist and beyond. He had resumed creating a few ankle boots in 1959, part of a trend of the time, and expanded his boot range in the early 1960s. For fall of 1962, many designers showed a range of boots up to knee height, and the following year some boots stretched to the thigh. The most famous of these were the low-heeled, thigh-high boots Vivier produced for Yves Saint Laurent's fall 1963 collection in materials from leathers to satin, particularly a much-photographed pair in black crocodile worn with a Space Age-looking outfit. The thigh-high boots in this collection had been inspired by a pair Vivier had made for a Rudolf Nureyev performance of Swan Lake. He would continue to produce thigh-high and higher boots into the early 1970s, including versions in stretch satin and transparent plastic, all with the low to flat heels of the period. Vivier also contributed astute versions of the low-heeled calf-high boots especially popular from 1963 to '65. For the Courrèges-style Space Age designs of Emanuel Ungaro, Vivier produced squared-off calf-high boots of silver leather, white knee boots with a chromed metal band closing the top, and thigh boots in white stretch vinyl and clear plastic. In 1964, he made waist-high boot pants for Simonetta e Fabiani in both day and evening fabrics, and in 1968 he merged a footpiece with a stretch jumpsuit for Jean-Marie Armand, creating an all-in-one boot-jumpsuit.

After showing an occasional thickened sole earlier in the decade, in 1967 he debuted complete lines of platform shoes, updated for the 1960s, including in two collections for Saint Laurent, launching an industry trend that would expand and become characteristic of the early 1970s.

He also resumed showing more high heels in 1967, with some as high as two-and-a-half inches but still chunky-looking. His newest heels flared from top to bottom, simultaneously looking thick and giving an impression of greater height. Nineteen sixty-seven was also the year of his Africa-themed shoes for Saint Laurent, with versions of the period's flat, strapped-up-the-leg sandals featuring African-looking masks over the shins.

In 1969, Vivier added a line of men's shoes.

As the broader fashion world moved away from haute couture and toward ready-to-wear in the late sixties and early seventies, Vivier too went this route, ceasing to provide made-to-order couture services in 1970 and concentrating only on his ready-made lines.

He continued with thick heels, platforms, and boots in the early seventies, coordinating his proportions with the new midiskirts and hot pants.

Later in the seventies, Vivier retreated to his home in Périgord, eventually withdrawing almost entirely and working on sculpture while continuing to sketch shoe ideas.

A series of Vivier retrospectives in 1980 signaled renewed interest in his work. The 1980s saw various revivals in the fashion world – forties revivals, fifties revivals, sixties revivals – including 1950s-style pumps becoming common again, and Vivier was inspired to both create new work and update signature older hallmarks like comma heels, ball-tipped heels, thigh-high boots, and shin-mask sandals. Major museums displayed landmark Vivier designs from their permanent collections, exhibitions were held in various cities, and a new Vivier boutique opened in New York, his offerings once again available in both ready-to-wear and made-to-order form.

Grace Kelly, Ava Gardner, Gloria Guinness, Wallis Simpson, Régine Zylberberg, John Lennon, and The Beatles were all Vivier customers, and he designed shoes for Queen Elizabeth II for her Coronation in 1953.

Vivier occasionally designed for the stage, providing footwear for the dancers Rudolf Nureyev and Zizi Jeanmaire.

== See also ==
- Stiletto heel
- Catherine Deneueve
- Ines de la Fressange
- Gherardo Felloni
