= Herbert Levine =

Herbert Levine may refer to:

- Herbert Levine (fashion executive), American fashion executive
- Herbert Levine (company), American shoe label founded by the above
- Herbert Levine (physicist), American physicist
