= Helene Verin =

American designer, author, and curator

- Education: University of Wisconsin–Madison
- Occupations: Designer, author, curator, educator
- Known for: Wallpaper, furniture and shoe design; scholarship on Beth Levine
- Notable work: Beth Levine Shoes (2009)
- Spouse: Rodney Ripps (m. 1979; divorced)
- Children: Ryder Ripps

Helene Verin is an American designer, author, and curator. Across a career documented in The New York Times from 1988 onward she has designed shoes, wallpaper, furniture, rugs, tiles and interiors; the paper has described her variously as "a designer of shoes and home furnishings", "a designer of furniture, wallpaper, rugs and shoes", and "a product and interior designer". She later taught at the Fashion Institute of Technology and wrote Beth Levine Shoes (2009), a monograph on the American shoe designer Beth Levine, whose work she presented in three museum exhibitions.

== Early life and education ==
Verin grew up in Highland Park, Illinois, the daughter of Bernard D. Verin, a former president of Chicago Aligraphy Inc. She graduated from the University of Wisconsin–Madison. Before entering design she worked as assistant director of special projects at KTCA-TV in Minneapolis and, by 1979, as a management consultant for arts organizations.

== Design career ==
=== Shoes ===
The New York Times reported in 1992 that Verin had designed shoes for Bernardo and Keds. In later coverage the paper described her as a shoe and accessories designer, a housewares and shoe designer, and a designer of "shoes, purses, pillows, floor tiles, rugs and wallpaper".

=== Massachusetts Museum of Culture and Accessories ===
In May 1988 Verin opened the Massachusetts Museum of Culture and Accessories, a 200-square-foot shop in Lenox, Massachusetts, selling avant-garde housewares and fashion accessories by twenty artists. She said the name was partly a joke at the expense of the much larger Massachusetts Museum of Contemporary Art, then being developed in North Adams. Verin displayed the stock as art, with lamps and glass on pedestals and jewelry hung in gilded frames: she "wanted to showcase the designs in a museum setting where they wouldn't get lost, as they do when they are sold in a department store." The shop also carried her own work, including a rug designed to resemble a wood floor.

=== Wallpaper ===
Verin designed and hand-printed wallpaper in Lenox under the company name Fern I. Tchur. Her pattern Flypaper, introduced at the International Contemporary Furniture Fair in Manhattan in 1991, scattered gold-rendered flies, butterflies, ladybugs and beetles at wide intervals against plain grounds; she consulted entomology books for the renderings. A companion pattern, Tape Measure, staggered six measuring tapes so the repeat appeared random. "Very few wallpapers are hip," she told the Times. "Most are those all-over rose patterns with vines, and they don't appeal to me."

A 1992 Times survey of artist-designed wallpaper discussed her work alongside that of Roy Lichtenstein, Gerhard Richter and Donald Judd, and described a second Verin design, Truth, printed with the words serenity, liberty, justice, sublime, honesty, artistry and strength. "Covering the walls is such an ancient art," she said. "Since the caves of Lascaux, people have been decorating their walls." The papers were sold through the John Boone showroom in Manhattan. Her hand-printed wallpaper was covered again in The New York Times Magazine in 1996.

In 1991 Verin and the decorative painter Benjamin Pasteur created a sitting room called "Rome at Dusk" for a designer show house at Edith Wharton's home The Mount, covering the ceiling in her hand-painted royal blue paper with gilt stars.

=== Furniture and interiors ===
After buying a small studio apartment in Greenwich Village in 1993, Verin designed a line of lightweight solid maple furniture — two desks, two consoles, a coffee table and chairs — that could be recombined for different uses, with tapered ends and edges carved to follow the grain. She cited Charles Eames's bentwood chairs and "his feeling of lightness" as the inspiration: "This room is not an architectural wonder. Anything heavy or bold would overwhelm it. I wanted to make the furniture seem like clouds and disappear."

In 1999 she and the artist Mike Stoughton built a staircase to her son's loft bed from painted skateboards: "Aliens, thunderbolts and bull's-eyes are on backgrounds of brilliant oranges, apple greens and electric blues," she said. "They're the canvases of young artists." In 2000 the Times commissioned her as one of three Manhattan designers asked to produce a budget concept kitchen, for which she combined inexpensive IKEA frosted-glass cabinets lit from within with custom-cut solid walnut counters, and cut the pass-through to the dining room in the shape of an egg — the thick walnut sill beneath it, she said, being "the shadow of the egg."

== Teaching ==
Verin has taught as an adjunct professor at the Fashion Institute of Technology in New York City.

== Work on Beth Levine ==
Verin met Beth Levine (1914–2006), the principal designer behind the Herbert Levine shoe label, after moving to New York in the late 1970s to become a shoe designer. Writing for the Smithsonian's National Portrait Gallery, Verin described Levine as a mentor and friend, and recounted that after returning to New York in 1996 she visited Levine several times a week to work through her archives and record her recollections; Levine gave her samples, shoe ornaments and press materials from the company's former factory storage. Verin has said she pursued the work because her students had never heard of Levine.

=== Beth Levine Shoes ===
Verin's monograph Beth Levine Shoes, with photography by David Hamsley, was published by Stewart, Tabori & Chang, an imprint of Harry N. Abrams, in 2009.

=== Exhibitions ===
- Beth Levine: The First Lady of Shoes, Dutch Leather and Shoe Museum, Waalwijk, Netherlands, 2009, co-curated with Inge Specht.
- Beth Levine: First Lady of Shoes, Bellevue Arts Museum, Bellevue, Washington, 2010, with more than 100 pairs of shoes and boots.
- Beth Levine: The First Lady of Shoes, The Long Island Museum, Stony Brook, New York, 21 August 2015 – 3 January 2016, as guest curator. The exhibition comprised nearly 150 artifacts and works of art, anchored by Philip Pearlstein's 1985 portrait of Levine, lent by the National Portrait Gallery. Joshua Ruff, the museum's director of collections and interpretation, wrote that Verin was the right person to lead the project. It was reviewed in The New York Times.

== Arsho Baghsarian: A Life in Shoes ==
Verin's second book covers the shoe designer Arsho Baghsarian, who designed for four decades for labels including Christian Dior, Andrew Geller and Stuart Weitzman. Published by Schiffer Fashion Press in 2019, it reproduces sketches, prototypes and shoes Baghsarian donated to the Fashion Institute of Technology; Stuart Weitzman wrote the introduction and Karen Trivette, head of FIT Special Collections, the foreword.

== Portraits by Warhol and Pearlstein ==
Verin sat for Andy Warhol in 1980. A Polaroid from the sitting, catalogued Verin, Helene (Mrs. Rodney Ripps) and dated April 1980, is in the permanent collection of the Chazen Museum of Art at the University of Wisconsin–Madison, a gift of The Andy Warhol Foundation for the Visual Arts. The resulting painting, Portrait of Helene Verin, acrylic and silkscreen ink on canvas, was shown at Betty Cuningham Gallery in the 2016 exhibition Pearlstein, Warhol, Cantor: From Carnegie Tech to New York, reviewed in The Brooklyn Rail.

In 2016 she sat for Philip Pearlstein over fourteen sittings. Artsy reported that she may be the only person portrayed by both artists. She wrote Musing: Sitting for a Portrait by Philip Pearlstein (Betty Cuningham Gallery, 2017) to accompany Pearlstein's exhibition Facing You.

== Personal life ==
Verin married the artist Rodney Ripps on 2 December 1979 at her parents' home in Highland Park, Illinois, and kept her own name. Their son is the conceptual artist Ryder Ripps. The marriage lasted eighteen years; afterwards Verin returned to New York from the Berkshires and bought a loft on East 22nd Street in the Flatiron district, which she renovated for herself and her son.

Verin later moved to Palm Springs, California, buying a home in Royal Hawaiian Estates, the 1959 Donald Wexler development in Twin Palms built for the architect's mother and her friends, who as Jews had been excluded from other neighborhoods in the area. Her home, where her Warhol and Pearlstein portraits hang together, is profiled in the photography book Inside Palm Springs (Vendome Press, 2025) by Don Flood with text by Peter Haldeman.

== Publications ==
- Beth Levine Shoes. New York: Stewart, Tabori & Chang, 2009. ISBN 978-1-58479-759-3
- Musing: Sitting for a Portrait by Philip Pearlstein. New York: Betty Cuningham Gallery, 2017.
- Arsho Baghsarian: A Life in Shoes. Atglen, PA: Schiffer Fashion Press, 2019. ISBN 978-0-7643-5732-8
