= Darryll Schiff =

Darryll Schiff (born 1948) is an American contemporary artist specializing in photography based in Chicago, Illinois.

Died December 29, 2020

Schiff was born in Chicago, Illinois. He holds a BFA from the Institute of Design (1971) in Chicago, Illinois. His work has been exhibited around the world and he is held in collections of many of the world’s leading museums.

== Early life ==
Schiff was born in 1948, one of four children in Chicago, Illinois. The artist’s immersion into the world of fine art began when he was eight years old, taking weekend classes at the Art Institute of Chicago. His formal photography education was at the Institute of Design studying under Arthur Siegel, Joseph Jachna, Gary Winograd and Aaron Siskind. The curriculum consisted of Bauhaus teaching, classical photography, but also a strong encouragement to experiment. He was one of three undergraduate students represented in the famed Student Independent Portfolio.

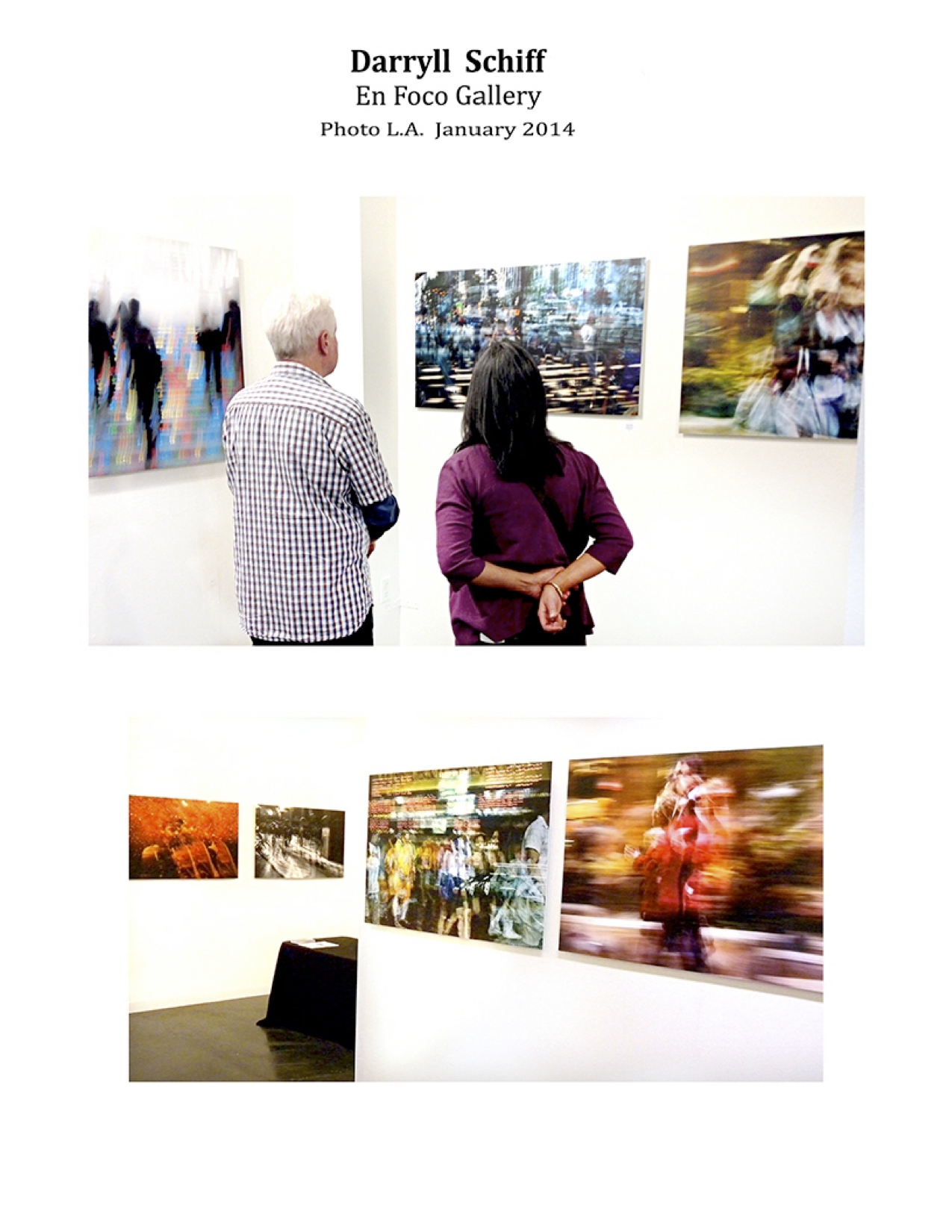
Schiff's work on display at Photo L.A. an international Photographic Art Exhibition

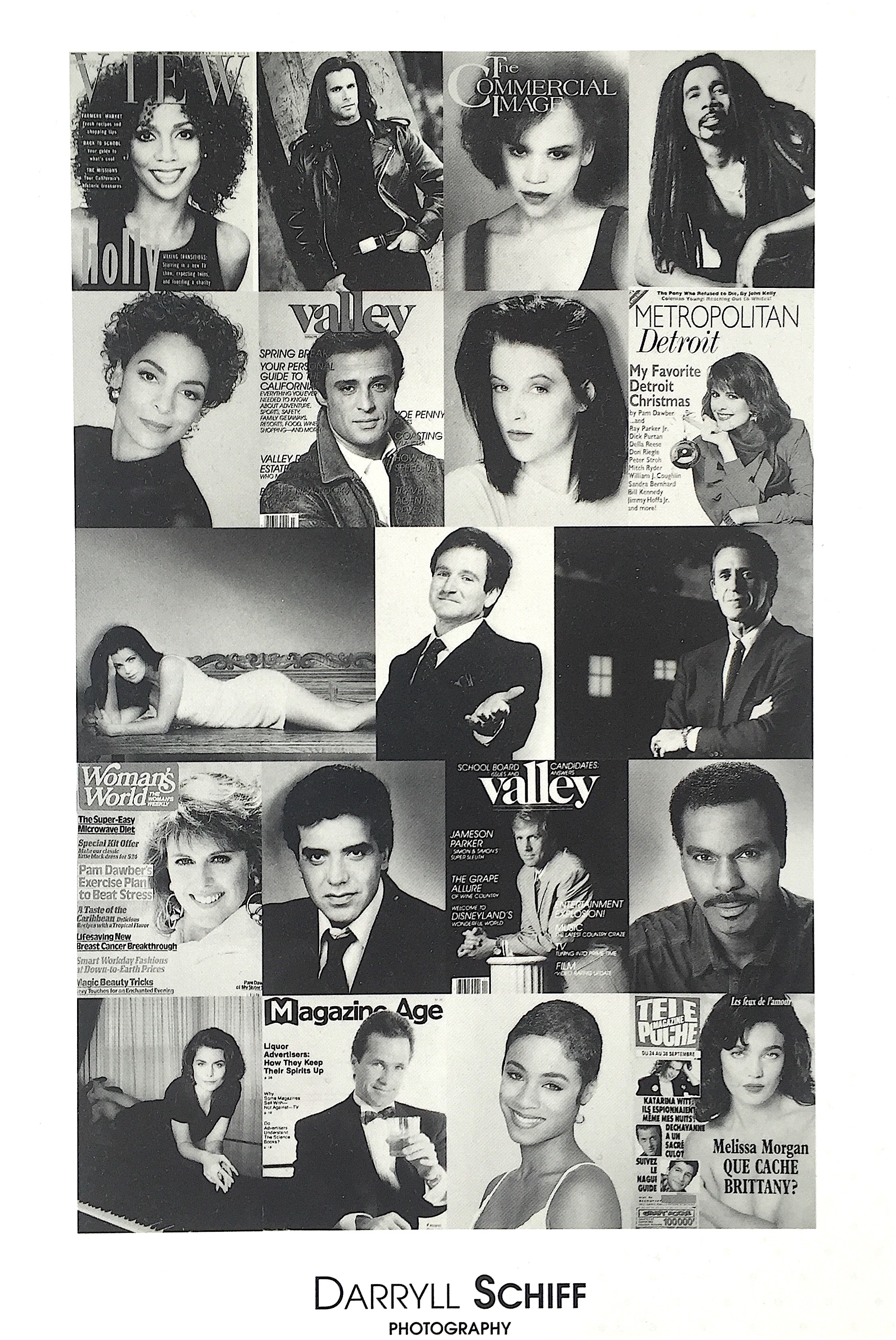
Darryll Schiff's celebrity clientele

== Career ==
After the Institute of Design and continuing to work on his fine art, Schiff also pursued a successful commercial photography career, including shooting assignments for Los Angeles Magazine, San Francisco Magazine, Rolling Stone, Women’s Wear Daily, Stern, Geo, Beverly Hills Magazine, Pepsi, Capitol Records and Charles Jourdan. His list of celebrity clients include Tea Leoni, Lisa Marie Presley, Mark Harmon, Chazz Palminteri, Jason Patric, Jasmine Guy, Robin Williams, Holly Robinson Peete, Regina King and Jada Pinkett Smith.

Some of Schiff's fine art photography is located in the collections of the Art Institute of Chicago, Metropolitan Museum of Art in New York, George Eastman House, Museum of Contemporary Art in Chicago, Norton Simon Museum and the Museum of Contemporary Photography in Chicago. Koehnline Museum of Art acquired its second fine art print form Darryll Schiff "The Parade Commences" from Schiff's Descending to Heaven series in November 2017.

Darryll Schiff is one of Chicago's most influential artists. Schiff pushes the boundaries of what photography can do; using the camera as a tool to paint with, bend and use abstractly rather than as a form of documentation. Schiff has been the owner of Darryll Schiff Fine Art since April, 1999.

Darryll Schiff is represented by BOCCARA Fine Art New York and Paris. Besides Schiff, BOCCARA represents an important collection of historically influential artists including Jim Dine, Pablo Picasso, Joan Miró, Alexander Calder, Gianfranco Meggiato, and Laurence Jenkell, among others.

Schiff is also one of the artistic members selected to participate in the Wabash Arts Corridor (WAC) with his twenty-four by fifty-six ft mural titled "Descending into Heaven". This mural's coordinates can also be found on the Public Art Chicago app.

Schiff has been exhibited internationally in prominent art fairs such as Photo L.A. (2014), Art Busan, South Korea (2016), Bazaar Jakarta, Indonesia (2016), Art Miami (2017), New York Art Week (2018), and PLAS Seoul, South Korea (2019).

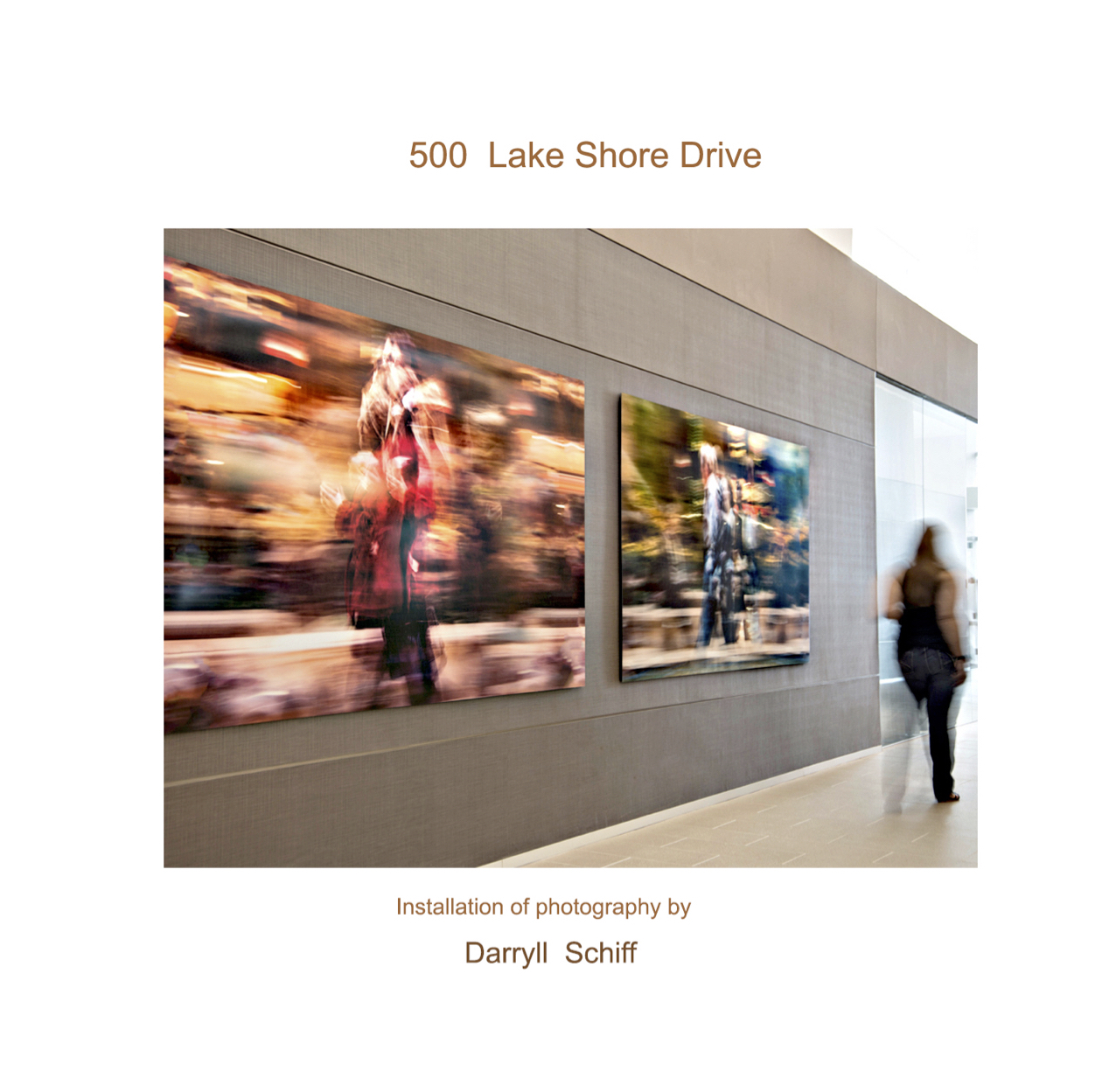
Darryll Schiff, Evanescence, 500 Lake Shore Drive Chicago
