= Charles Jourdan =

French fashion designer (1883–1976)

- Born: 1883
- Died: 12 February 1976 (aged 92–93)

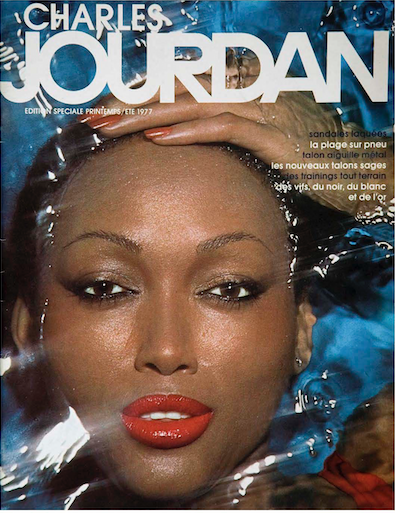

Charles Jourdan (1883 – 12 February 1976) was a French fashion designer known best for his designs of women's shoes starting in 1919. His name reached its greatest reputation in the years since his death under the leadership of his sons, first with an emphasis on the use of innovative materials and later for more conservative designs. After 2000 the company went into decline and was sold to investment bankers.

== Biography ==
Originally trained as a shoemaker, after World War I Jourdan opened a shoe shop in Romans-sur-Isère in the Drôme region of France, the center of France's shoe industry. His lines of women's shoes prospered, and this became the focus of his career. After only two years Jourdan moved his shoe company into a factory on Boulevard Voltaire in 1921 and employed over 30 people in Romans.

In the 1930s, Jourdan was the first shoe designer to place advertisements in the high-end fashion magazines, which helped to identify his name as an haute couture house.

In 1947 his three sons Rene, Charles and Roland joined the company, and in 1950 they expanded beyond France and began selling designer shoes in the United Kingdom. One regular customer was none other than Lady Diana Spencer who, eventually became Princess of Wales.

Jourdan and his sons opened his first boutique in Paris in 1957, although the company headquarters remained in Romans. They were granted a license to design and manufacture shoes under the Christian Dior brand in 1959 and in more recent years have also created designs under the Pierre Cardin label.

The company has for many years focused on being viewed as setting trends and innovating in fashion design, and it can be debated whether Herbert Levine and Beth Levine inspired this innovation or learned from it; both may be true. Jourdan and the Levines are arguably the most innovative designers to use new materials in women's shoes in the period since World War II. In the 1960s and early 1970s Jourdan used its magazine advertising campaigns to advance its avant-garde image by using imagery from the surrealist photographer Guy Bourdin. In 1975 ready-to-wear clothing and handbags were added to the Jourdan line, although the company has remained best known for its shoes.

Charles Jourdan died in Paris in 1976, but the company continued under the leadership of his sons. During this decade Roland Jourdan began to lead the company's designs, taking the basic pump, lengthening the toe and adding simple buckles to increase both its delicacy and its tailored image. By this time Jourdan boutiques were open in major cities across Europe and in North America. Roland Jourdan retired in 1981, and the company subsequently was known for more conservative designs.

Jourdan gained unintended publicity from the exposure of Imelda Marcos' excesses in shoe fashion in 1986, among them many Jourdan stilettos.

The company has also created a limited number of perfumes, including a scent called Stiletto (after the stiletto heel) in 1996 to recognize the 75th anniversary of the firm. To honor Paris the bottle was shaped like the Eiffel Tower.

The flagship store for the Romans-based manufacturer was moved to the Champs-Élysées in Paris in 1999, but it remained open for less than two years due to financial troubles caused by a switch in emphasis from design to retailing. In mid-2002 the company filed for bankruptcy with over $9 million in debt and was reorganized as the Jourdan family sold its stake to a Luxembourg investment fund, Lux Diversity. Sales had fallen to only 65,000 pairs per year.

Patrick Cox, a Canadian who had launched his own shoe label, was named head designer of Charles Jourdan in 2003. In 2005 he left the firm and was replaced by Josephus Thimister.

== Cocktail ==
Charles Jourdan may also be responsible for the somewhat obscure titular cocktail. Its original iteration requires somewhat obscure ingredients, as follows:

- 4 cl lighter, flowery tequila
- 3 cl verjus
- 2 cl sweet white Gewürztraminer
- 1 cl Triple Sec
- 0.5 cl crème de violette
- 2 dashes orange bitters

Alternative recipes substitute lychee liqueur, gin, and grapefruit juice for the more recondite ingredients.
