= Rodney Ripps =

American conceptual artist, painter and sculptor

- Born: December 6, 1950 (age 75); New York City, U.S.
- Education: Hunter College; York College
- Movement: Neo-expressionism
- Spouse: Helene Verin (m. 1979, divorced)
- Children: 2, including Ryder Ripps

Rodney Ripps (born December 6, 1950) is an American artist, painter, and sculptor. Ripps is most known for textural density, heavy layering of materials, and heightened canvases in his work, often produced with high volumes of oil paint and incorporation of artificial leaves and metals, among other materials.

== Early and personal life ==
Rodney Ripps was born in Brooklyn, New York, to Anne (née Jacobie) and Sol Michael Ripps. His father owned and operated a dry cleaning service in Manhattan, New York. Ripps graduated from Andrew Jackson High School in Cambria Heights, Queens, New York. He is an alumnus of both Hunter College and York College.

On December 2, 1979, Ripps married designer and academic Helene Verin in the latter's hometown of Chicago. They divorced when their son, conceptual artist Ryder Ripps, was nine years old. He has another son, Ezra, who is a programmer.

== Career ==
Ripps rose to prominence in the 1970s. In 1977, Ripps participated in his first group exhibition, "Painting 75/76/77" at the Cincinnati Contemporary Arts Center. Ripps was an affiliate of Andy Warhol's, posing for a series of Polaroid photographs shot by the latter. Ripps was also mentioned in Warhol's journals and appeared as a guest on the talk show Andy Warhol's TV. Early in his career, Ripps worked in construction as a source of supplemental income. Ripps' illustration, "Rosette", was present in the Whitney Museum's 1979 Biennial event.

=== Style and critical reception ===
Ripps' work has been tethered to a variety of American artistic movements, most notably neo-expressionism and ornamentalism. This is, in part, the result of Ripps' continuous incantation of nature in his work. In a 1979 review in ArtForum, art critic Donald B. Kuspit attempted to term Ripps' work as a "Cosmetic Transcendentalism". This terminology defined Ripps' work as a self-conscious form of transcendentalism that, through vibrancy of colors, scale, and textural variety, embrace "its own cosmetic character, and which is an expression of a theatrical ambition" of the contemporary artistic landscape. Ripps' paintings are often supplemented with artificial leaves made of linen, often bound together and worked over heavily with thick layers of oil paint.

Ripps' work has retrospectively been defined by art historians as an unspoken influence of Julian Schnabel, a sentiment echoed by Ripps himself.

=== Notable works ===
Two of Ripps' works, "Untitled" (1976) and "The Meadow" (1980) belong to the permanent collection at the Brooklyn Museum under their Contemporary Arts wing. Six of Ripps' work belong to the Vogel 50x50 collection. "Odyssey in Space" (1980), is part of the permanent collection at the Centre Pompidou in Paris, France

=== Selected solo exhibitions ===
- 1977: Nancy Lurie Gallery, Chicago, Illinois
- Gallery Bruno Bishofberger, Zurich, Germany
- 1979: Galerie Hans Mayer, Düsseldorf, West Germany
- 1980: Akira Ikeda – Nagoya, Nagoya, Japan
- 1981: Holly Solomon Gallery, New York City, New York, United States
- Munson-Williams Procter Institute, Utica, New York
- Gallery G7, Blogna, Italy
- Gallery 121, Antwerp, Belgium
- Dart Gallery, Chicago
- Galleria Schema, Florence, Italy
- 1982: Galerie Daniel Templon, Paris, 1982
- Carl Solway Gallery, Cincinnati, 1983
- 1983: Munson-Williams Procter Institute, Utica, New York
- 1984: Carnegie Mellon U., Pittsburgh, 1984
- 1985: Marisa Del Re Gallery, New York City
- 1991: "now is the silence"- Marisa del Re Gallery, New York City, New York, United States
