= Josephus Thimister =

Belgian interior designer

- Born: Josephus Melchior Thimister; 16 September 1962; Maastricht, Netherlands
- Died: 13 November 2019 (aged 57); Paris, France
- Education: Royal Academy of Fine Arts Antwerp
- Labels: THIMISTER, Balenciaga, Charles Jourdan, Genny, Andy Warhol
- Awards: Fashion Trophy Paris, Best Designer of the Year Barneys, for the first collection Balenciaga
- Website: thimister.com

Josephus Melchior Thimister (16 September 1962 – 13 November 2019) was a Dutch interior decorator and noted fashion designer who launched his eponymous fashion label, THIMISTER in 1997. In 2001, the editor-in-chief of Vogue USA Anna Wintour named Josephus Thimister as one of the Twenty-First Century's best fashion designers. In 2010, Cathy Horyn writing for The New York Times described his couture show and its pieces as, "fascinating (…) quite clear in military shapes and broken elegance. Dresses like melted down family silver". After a brief period with Karl Lagerfeld as an assistant, he worked as a designer at Jean Patou before being appointed director of luxury prêt-à-porter at the house of Balenciaga. It was for the next five and a half years that Thimister would spend reviving the brand with his pure, succinctly modernist vision. He then set up his own Paris-based house in 1997, and thereafter presented both haute couture and prêt-à-porter collections under his name.

== Early life and career ==
Born to parents of Russian, Belgian, and French descent in Maastricht, Netherlands in 1962, Thimister knew of his passion for design at the age of four. His ambitions soon materialized when he graduated from the fashion department of the Royal Academy of Fine Arts Antwerp summa cum laude in 1987; the same year Thimister claimed first prize for design in the institution. Within a year, the aspiring designer found himself working under Karl Lagerfeld, then creative director of Chanel and also of his own eponymous label.

=== Early career ===
Thimister then worked at the House of Patou in preparation of their 1990 haute-couture collection. From 1987 to 1992, Thimister also freelanced as an illustrator and interior decorator for magazines (Vogue, Vogue Déco, Elle Déco, World of Interiors), private clients, exhibitions (Maison et Object, Musée Carnavalet, Grand Palais), and created art installations in Rome.

=== Balenciaga Years ===
In 1991, Thimister advanced toward Balenciaga where he would hold the position as artistic director of luxury women’s prêt-à-porter and accessories for over half a decade. It was said that at Balenciaga, he "contributed through his minimalist style and great skills in cutting in modernizing the house's image."

After spending nearly six years with Balenciaga, Thimister began to design for the Italian ready-to-wear label Genny in 1998. At Genny, Thimister readapted classic military coats and bias-cut gowns; synthesizing dramatic, long leather skirts with elegant crisp cotton-glazed shirts. His designs showed a different approach of the art, demonstrating his individuality among the established couture names. Critics were struck by the modernity and apparent simplicity of his silhouettes.

In February 2005, Thimister was named head designer by the house of Charles Jourdan, in replacement of Patrick Cox. Working at Charles Jourdan, Thimister became known for his poetically Nordic, lightly surrealist and controversial creations.

Thimister thereafter did stints with various fashion-influenced institutions for three years.

He designed a collection inspired by Andy Warhol entitled "Andy Warhol: Heroes & Icons", put on display in 2006 around Europe.

He also supervised and consulted the concept design of handbags under the Swarovski name.

=== House of Thimister ===
In a few years, Thimister had designed an entire mélange of haute couture and luxury prêt-a-porter pieces. In January 2010, after being invited by the Fédération française de la couture, his return show was met with resounding success and received much praise from the press and the industry. The collection, termed "1915: Bloodshed and Opulence" an anti-war collection, was a medley of recycled military jackets and canvas tents, and elegant couture finishing of silk, crepe and satin lining. "I’m convinced that all of today’s problems are the conclusion of that period", claimed Thimister in an interview with Style.com, "I am recycling some of my favorite fabrics, like imperial satin and wool blends". An array of ultra-brut fused with ultra-sophistiqué materials were hence formed. The brand now boasts celebrated pieces of blood Red, rough Khaki and faded Ivory; pieces defined as “starkly beautiful” - (Jenny Barchfield)

== Personal life ==
Josephus Thimister resided in Dublin, Ireland as well as in Paris, France near his eponymous fashion house.

Thimister committed suicide on 13 November 2019. He was 57 years old.
