= Ryder Ripps =

American conceptual artist, programmer and creative director

- Born: July 7, 1986 (age 40); New York City, U.S.
- Education: The New School
- Style: Conceptual art; digital art
- Spouse: Farihin Ufiya (m. 2025)
- Parent(s): Rodney Ripps; Helene Verin
- Website: ryder-ripps.com

Ryder Ripps (born July 7, 1986) is an American conceptual artist, programmer, and creative director.

== Early life and education ==
Born in New York City, Ryder Ripps is a son of Jewish artist Rodney Ripps and designer Helene Verin. His parents divorced when he was nine years old. After discovering the Internet at the age of 10, he learned HTML and later JavaScript. He attended City-As-School High School and subsequently studied at The New School from 2004 to 2008, graduating with a degree in media studies. He has a younger brother, Ezra, who is also a programmer.

== Career ==
=== Commercial work ===
Ripps is the creative director of OKFocus, a digital marketing and design agency. He has created several websites, including Internet Archeology, Dump.fm, and VFiles, and has developed content for a number of contemporary musicians, fashion lines, and corporate brands such as Nike and Red Bull.

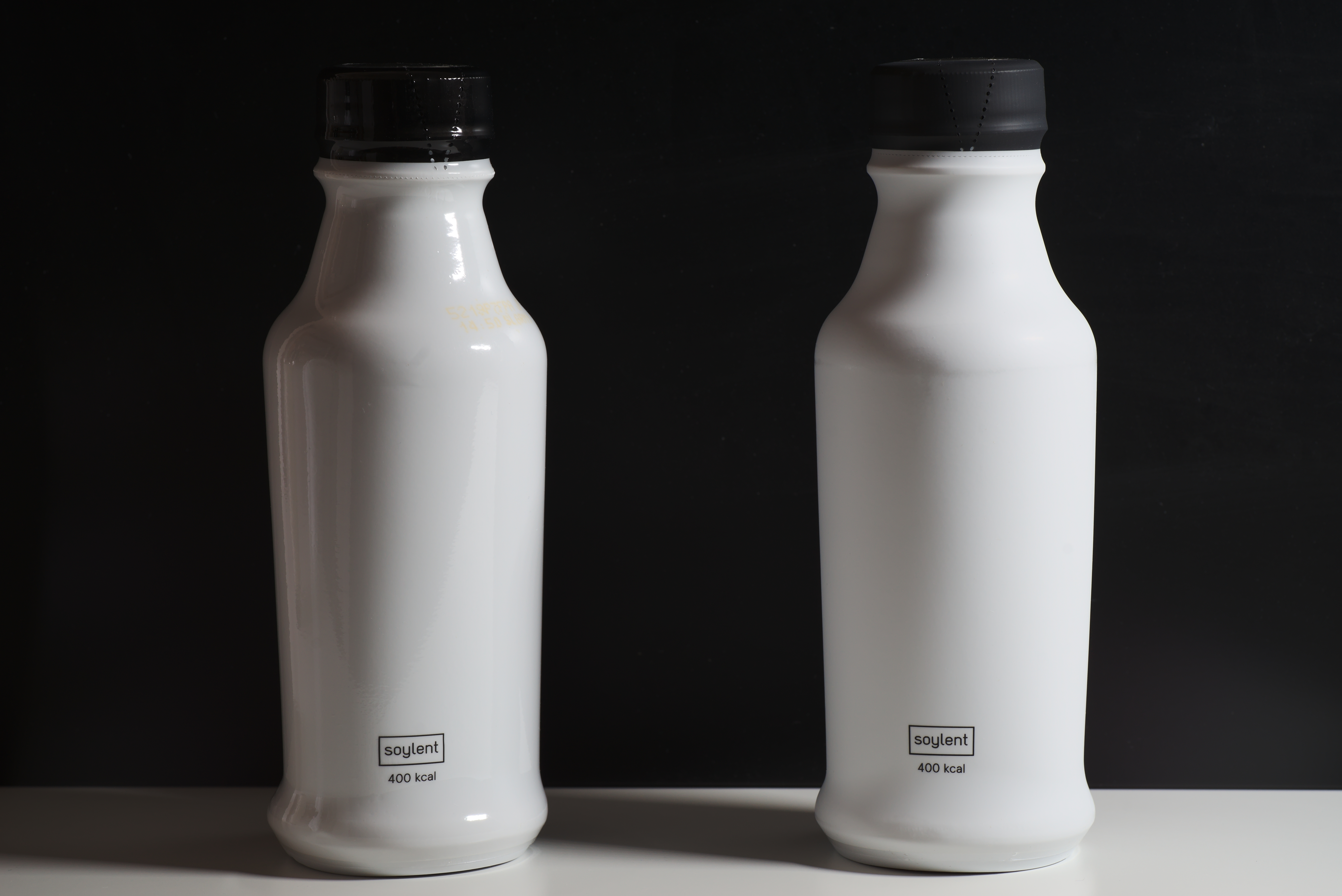
Soylent packaging designed by Ripps

In 2013, through OKFocus, Ripps created the branding for Soylent, a meal replacement drink, and was involved in the design until 2017. From 2014 to 2018, he worked with Kanye West. This included four months as a designer and creative director for West's company Donda. In 2015, he co-produced two songs on Miley Cyrus & Her Dead Petz.

Since 2019, Ripps has directed a number of music videos, and contributed photographs and designs to album artwork and advertising campaigns for Grimes (Miss Anthropocene), James Blake, and Travis Scott. Ripps acted as a creative director for Swedish pop singer Zara Larsson until he was publicly fired on March 13, 2021, after he body-shamed Larsson in private messages with Azealia Banks, calling her "Zara Armsson" and a "fat bitch".

In 2020, Ripps provided creative direction and design for American rapper Pop Smoke's posthumous record Shoot for the Stars, Aim for the Moon. Controversy surrounding the album's cover artwork arose after designer Virgil Abloh received negative feedback on his design.

=== Art work ===
Ripps's fine art practice is described as "art that uses online avenues to expose how social media can amplify narcissism and fear." He was listed in the Forbes "30 Under 30" in 2016.

In a 2014 piece titled Art Whore (stylized in all caps), the Ace Hotel in New York asked Ripps to be an artist-in-residence for one night. With a $50 budget, Ripps hired two sensual masseurs from Craigslist to draw in a hotel room, with Ripps comparing this to his own exploitation as an artist. The project sparked outcry, principally online, "for what they saw as blatant exploitation of women in the sex industry" even though one of the erotic masseurs was male. Critic Paddy Johnson declared it one of the most offensive exhibitions of the year and Rhizome described it as "unthinking, unethical, and dull", but also that "Ripps acted in a way that was ethically unsound: It reinforced and did not interrogate inequitable power relationships." In an interview, Ripps admits he regretted the title he chose.

Ripps' first solo exhibition took place in January 2015 at Postmasters Gallery in New York City, titled Ho. It featured large-scale oil painted portraits of digitally manipulated images from the Instagram account of model Adrianne Ho. The show "engages with the ways in which we portray women, tapping into the long history of the manipulation of images in the name of sex and advertisement." However, reception was varied, with Sandra Song writing for Jezebel that "his series is a visceral, knee-jerk way of removing and distorting a vision of female empowerment", and also notes the title of the show is a double entendre, as "ho" is slang for prostitute.

In 2016, Ripps exhibited Barbara Lee, an ode to the representative in Congress featuring 50,000 images downloaded from the internet covering a maquette of the Twin Towers at Steve Turner Gallery, Los Angeles.

In May 2017, Ripps premiered a small installation at the Venice Biennale titled Diventare Schiavo (Become a Slave) and featuring VR works, where the public was invited to virtually pack boxes. Freire Barnes of The Culture Trip remarked: "Here, laborious task becomes spectacle, while critiquing the socio-economic hierarchies of such technology."

In 2018, Ripps, in collaboration with photographer Maggie West, exhibited Pornhub Nation, a large interactive installation sponsored by Pornhub. The exhibition depicts a future history of the porn site's own government. It provided parodied solutions to the topics of climate change, military occupation, governmental surveillance, and space exploration.

In January 2021, Ripps claimed authorship of the Central Intelligence Agency's redesigned logo. On January 5, a CIA spokesperson denied his involvement in the redesign. In an interview with GQ, who described him as an "art prankster", Ripps explained that "[s]ocial online platforms are games that are played within the attention economy—authorship and sincerity are murky..."

Ripps has used non-fungible tokens (NFTs) in his practice of conceptual art. In July 2021, he received a DMCA takedown notice from Larva Labs, the parent company of CryptoPunks, after selling a near-identical version of an official image from the project.

==== Yuga Labs lawsuit ====
In June 2022, a lawsuit against Ripps and Jeremy Cahen was filed in U.S. federal court by Yuga Labs, the parent company of Bored Ape Yacht Club, over his RR/BAYC project. The suit accuses him of false advertising and trademark infringement, with Yuga Labs seeking financial damages. Yuga Labs believe that Ripps is organizing a "calculated, intentional, and willful" campaign to damage the reputation of Bored Ape Yacht Club.

On April 21, 2023, Judge John F. Walter of the United States District Court for the Central District of California issued a summary judgment in favor of Yuga Labs in the trademark infringement case, with the amount of monetary damages to be determined in a pending trial. The judge ruled that Ripps and Cahen sold their RR/BAYC NFTs without Yuga Labs' consent and in a manner likely to cause confusion, and had committed "false designation of origin" and "cybersquatting". In October 2023, Ripps and Cahen were ordered to pay more than $1.5 million in disgorgement and damages. They were also ordered to pay attorneys' fees and other costs, increasing the final judgment to over $8.8 million. On July 23, 2025, the 9th Circuit Court of Appeals overturned the 2023 judgment and sent the case back to federal court for a trial. The opinion authored by Judge Danielle J. Forrest found that Yuga Labs did not prove that Ripps and Cahen had confused NFT buyers.

=== Solo exhibitions ===
- 2015 - Ho, Postmasters, New York
- 2015 - Alone Together, Red Bull Studios, New York
- 2016 - Barbara Lee, Steve Turner, Los Angeles
- 2017 - Diventare Schiavo (Become a Slave), Zuecca Projects, Venice Italy

== Personal life ==
In February 2021, Ripps and American rapper Azealia Banks announced their engagement. They made an audio sex tape and sold it as a non-fungible token (NFT). By March, Banks announced they had split up.

Ripps resides in the Los Angeles area. As of January 2025, he is married to Farihin Ufiya.

== See also ==
- Post-Internet
