= Anna Thomson =

American actress (born 1953)

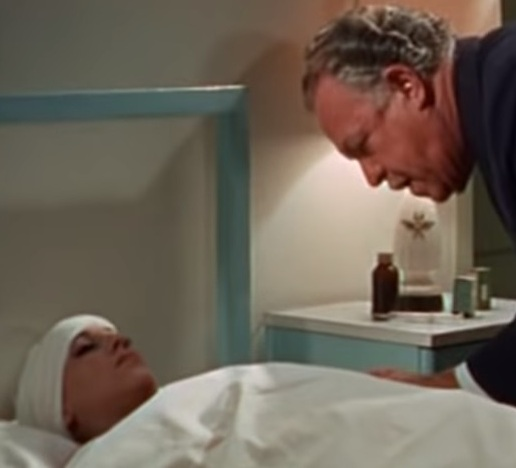
- Born: September 18, 1953 (age 73)
- Occupation: Actress
- Years active: 1975–2002

Anna Thomson (born Anna Levine September 18, 1953) is an American actress known for roles in Clint Eastwood's Unforgiven and several films directed by the Israeli filmmaker Amos Kollek. Over the course of her career she was also credited as Anna Levine-Thomson.

== Career ==
Thomson made her acting debut in the Off-Broadway play Kid Champion in 1975, and at the recommendation of her friend Christopher Walken, who she considered her "godfather in cinema". She made her film debut in the 1979 war veteran drama Night-Flowers and made subsequent minor appearances in films including Heaven’s Gate, Desperately Seeking Susan, At Close Range, Something Wild, Wall Street and Fatal Attraction. On the New York stage she appeared in plays including Uncommon Women and Others, The Singular Life of Albert Nobbs and Barbarians.

High-profile film work continued into the 1990s, with Thomson cast in True Romance, The Crow and Bad Boys, and appearing in a major supporting role in Unforgiven as the prostitute whose disfigurement sparks the film's story. Her television work includes portraying the role of Anna Rostov on The Colbys, and appearing on The Tracey Ullman Show and the HBO comedy sketch show Hardcore TV.

Her collaborations with the Israeli filmmaker Amos Kollek, among them Sue, Fiona and Fast Food Fast Women, earned Thomson cult status in France. In 1999, she said in a rare interview that she had grown distant from the American film industry. "If Hollywood ignores me, it’s also because I’m not very good at public relations; I don't send Christmas cards to remind them of me ... apart from a little money, there's nothing Hollywood I miss." By 2001 she had parted ways with her US acting agent entirely. Thomson's last major film performances were as an embittered transgender woman in François Ozon’s 2000 comedy Water Drops on Burning Rocks, and as a widowed single mother "sinking into alcoholism and despair" in 2002's Bridget, to date her final collaboration with Kollek.

== Personal life ==
Thomson was orphaned at an early age and adopted by fashion designer Beth Levine and business executive Herbert Levine before being raised between New York and France. She trained as a ballet dancer.

She married actor Davidson Thomson in 1989, after meeting while working on the Off-off-Broadway play The Poets’ Corner. They had twin sons in 1992, and were married until Thomson's death in 1993. She subsequently remarried, and now lives under the name Anna Thomson-Wilson.

== Filmography ==
Year	Title	Role	Notes
1979	Night-Flowers	Sandy	(as Anna Levine)
1980	Heaven's Gate	Little Dot	(as Anna Levine)
1982	Life of the Party: The Story of Beatrice	Janie	(as Anna Levine)
1984	The Pope of Greenwich Village	Waitress at Country Inn	(as Anna Levine)
1984	Maria's Lovers	Kathy	(as Anna Levine)
1985	Desperately Seeking Susan	Crystal	(as Anna Levine)
1985	Murphy's Romance	Wanda	(as Anna Levine)
1986	At Close Range	Barroom Dancer	(as Anna Levine)
1986	Something Wild	The Girl in 3F	(as Anna Levine)
1987	Fatal Attraction	Secretary	(as Anna Levine)
1987	Wall Street	Elevator Person	(as Anna Levine)
1987	Leonard Part 6	Nurse Carvalho	(as Anna Levine)
1988	White Hot	Heather	(as Anna Levine)
1988	Bird	Audrey	(as Anna Levine)
1988	Talk Radio	Denise	(as Anna Levine)
1989	Warlock	Pastor's Wife	(as Anna Levine)
1990	Tune in Tomorrow...	Faith Hope	(as Anna Levine Thomson)
1991	Dead in the Water	Edie Meyers	
1992	CrissCross	Monica	(as Anna Levine Thomson)
1992	Unforgiven	Delilah Fitzgerald	
1993	True Romance	Lucy	
1994	The Crow	Darla Mohr	
1994	Hand Gun	Laura	
1994	Baby's Day Out	Mrs. McCray	
1994	Blood Run	Tanya	
1995	Angela	Mae	
1995	Bad Boys	Francine	
1995	Cafe Society	Erica Steele	
1995	Drunks	Tanya	
1995	Angus	April Thomas	
1995	Other Voices, Other Rooms	Amy Skully	
1996	I Shot Andy Warhol	Iris	
1996	Dead Girl	Audition Receptionist	
1997	Sue Lost in Manhattan	Sue	
1997	Six Ways to Sunday	Annibelle	
1997	Trouble on the Corner	The Butcher's Wife	
1998	Jaded	Alexandra 'Alex' Arnold	
1998	Fiona	Fiona	
1999	Stringer	Ashley	
2000	The Intern	Antoinette De la Paix	(as Anna Thompson)
2000	Water Drops on Burning Rocks	Vera	
2000	Fast Food Fast Women	Bella	
2002	Bridget	Bridget	
2002	Mr. Smith Gets a Hustler	Doreen	(as Anna Thompson)
