= Sue (film) =

1997 American drama film directed by Amos Kollek

- Directed by: Amos Kollek
- Screenplay by: Amos Kollek
- Starring: Anna Thomson
- Music by: Chico Freeman
- Release date: September 12, 1997
- Running time: 87 minutes
- Country: United States

Sue, also known as Sue Lost in Manhattan, is a 1997 American drama film directed by Amos Kollek.

== Synopsis ==
Desperately alone, Sue wanders around New York City. From episodic companionships to unsuccessful job searches, distraught, she lets herself slowly be engulfed by a cold and aggressive city.

== Cast ==
- Anna Thomson as Sue
- Matthew Powers as Ben
- Tahnee Welch as Lola
- Tracee Ellis Ross as Linda
- John Ventimiglia as Larry
- Edoardo Ballerini as Eddie
- Matthew Faber as Sven
- Austin Pendleton as Bob
- Robert Kya-Hill as Willie
