= Mule (shoe) =

Type of shoe

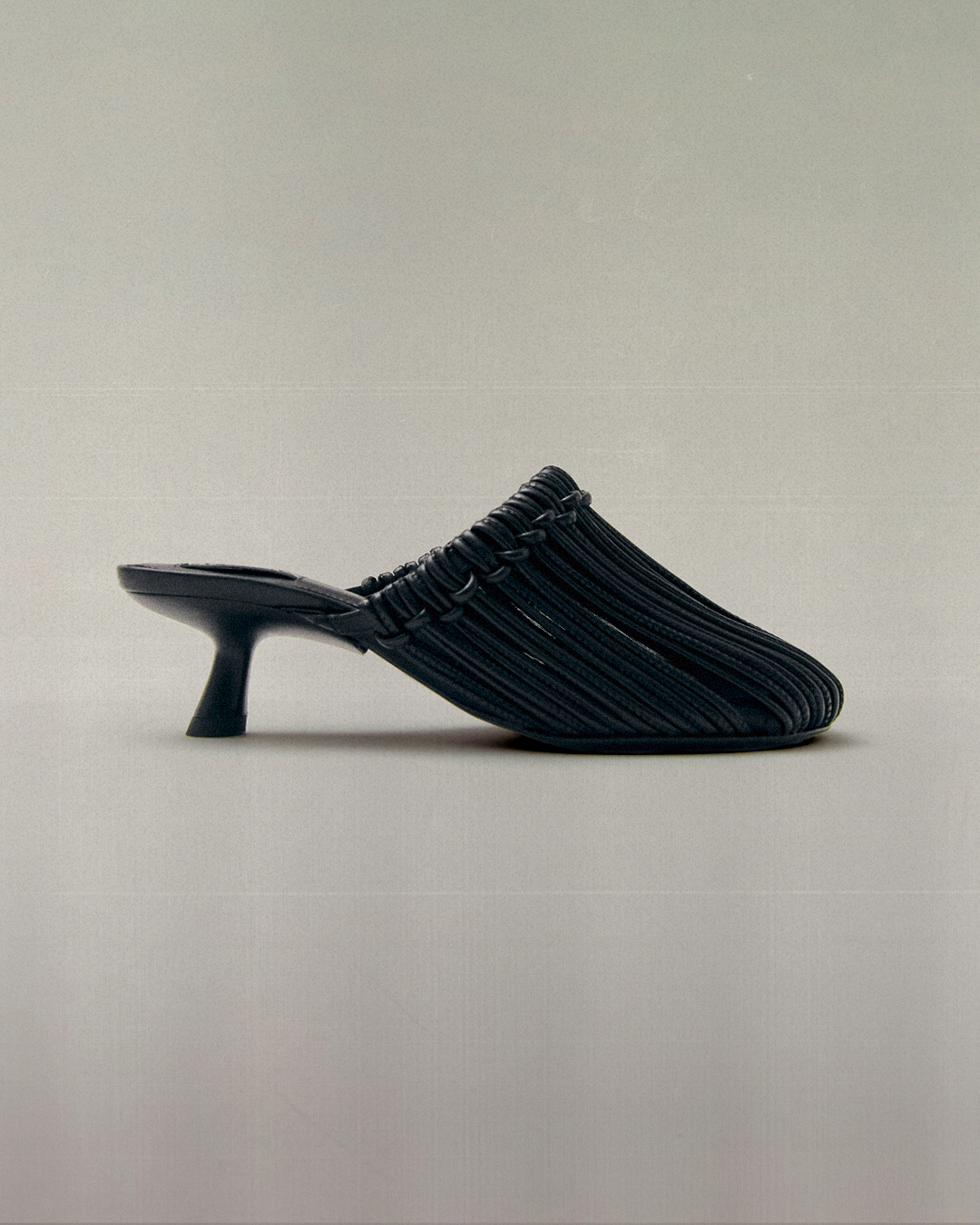
A pair of modern black mule shoes

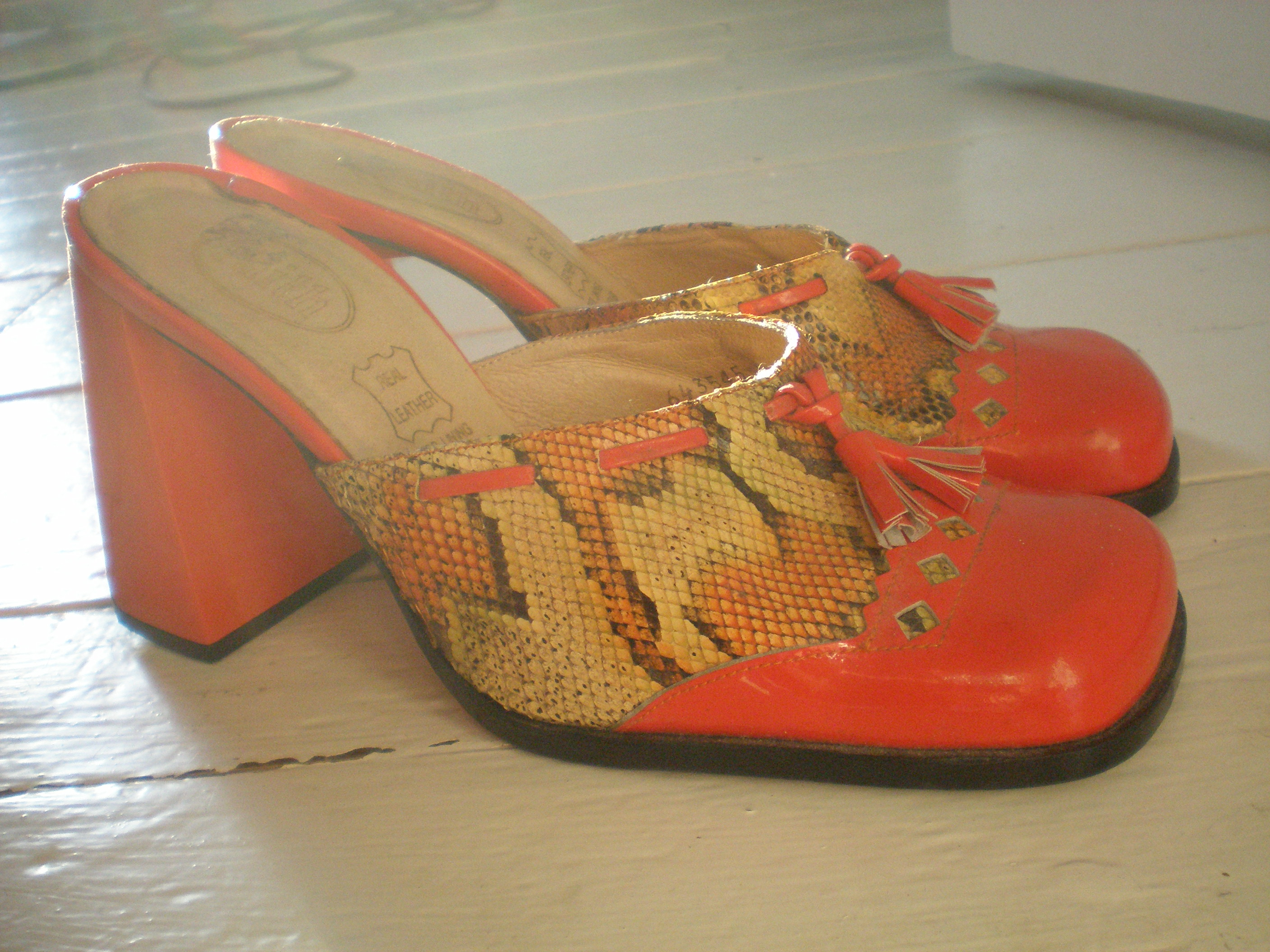
A pair of red and animal skin high heeled mules

Mule is a style of shoe that has no back or fastening around the heel. Mules may be flat or high-heeled, and their forms, materials, and decoration have varied considerably over time. The English word mule—originally written moyle—comes from French, where it was used specifically for women's open-heeled slippers by at least 1556.

From the 16th through the 19th centuries, mules were primarily worn as indoor or boudoir slippers, although their popularity and styles varied over time. They were worn by both men and women during the 18th century. Mules returned to fashion in the late 20th century. Historical examples are also documented in Egypt, Iran, Turkey, and India.

== Name ==
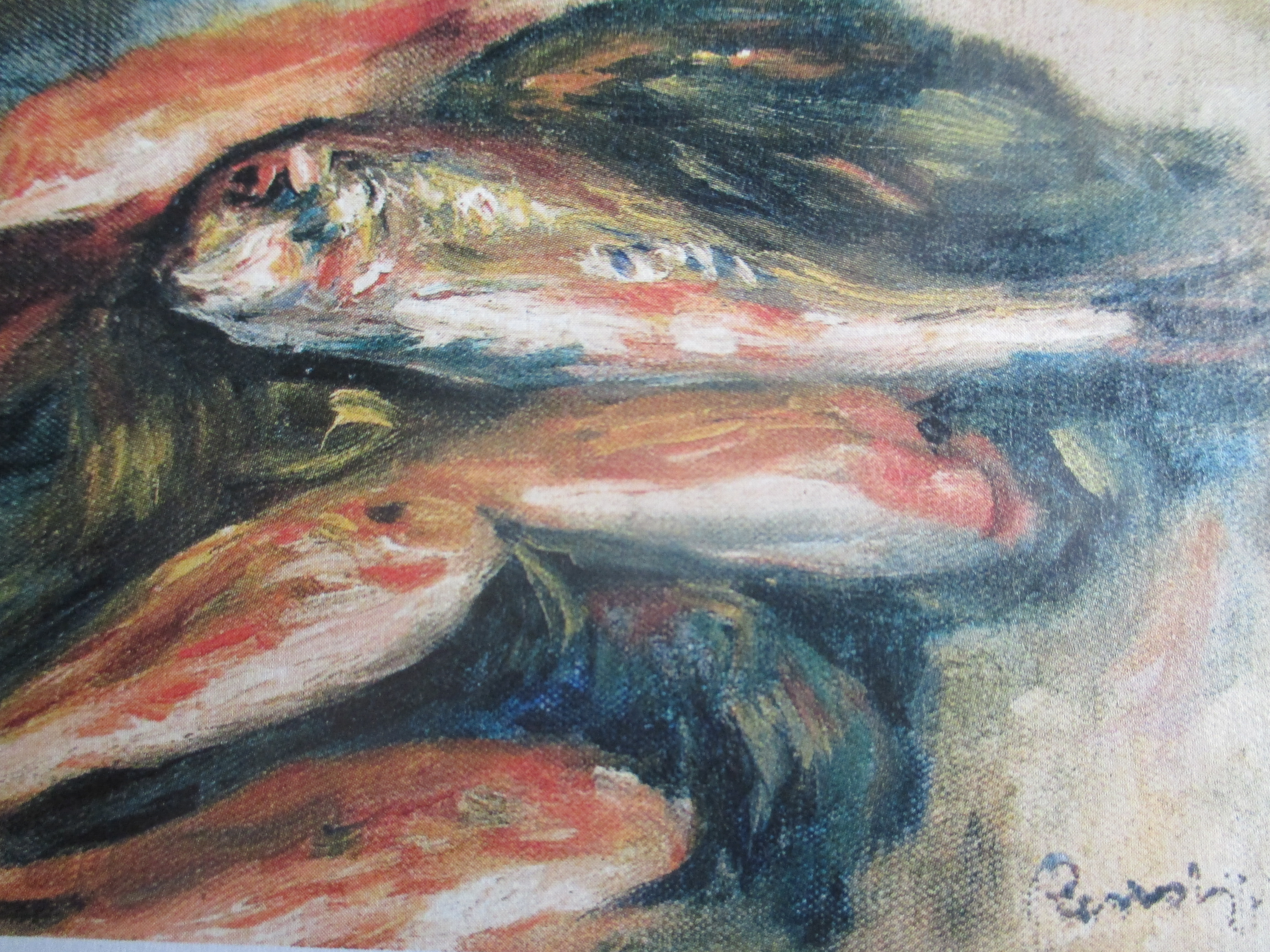
Renoir's Still Life with Mullets, the fish ultimately responsible for the shoes' name

The English word mule—originally written moyle—comes from French, which was using it specifically for women's slippers with an open heel since at least 1556. This sense seems to have been mixed at the time with the idea of any shoe with an especially thick sole. Medieval Latin mule ([ˈmuː le], MOO-lay) was a variant spelling of mulae, the plural of mula, used by c. 700 for slippers generally. This name in turn seems to have derived from the Classical calceus mulleus ("red calceus"), whose color name was taken from the much-prized red and striped red mullet fish. It is much disputed whether the mulleus properly referred to the special senatorial shoe (calceus senatorius) or the older shoe particular to Rome's patrician class (calceus patricius) since they both seem to have usually been dyed, may have varied over time, and Roman colors—particularly around items dyed with Tyrian purple—could encompass a large range of distinct shades. (The fish's name itself is cognate with the Greek mélas (μέλας), usually intending black.) In any case, the connection to the later use of the name for slippers may have been that the aristocratic calcei—particularly the luxurious mulleus—seem to have had a thicker-than-normal sole.

== History ==
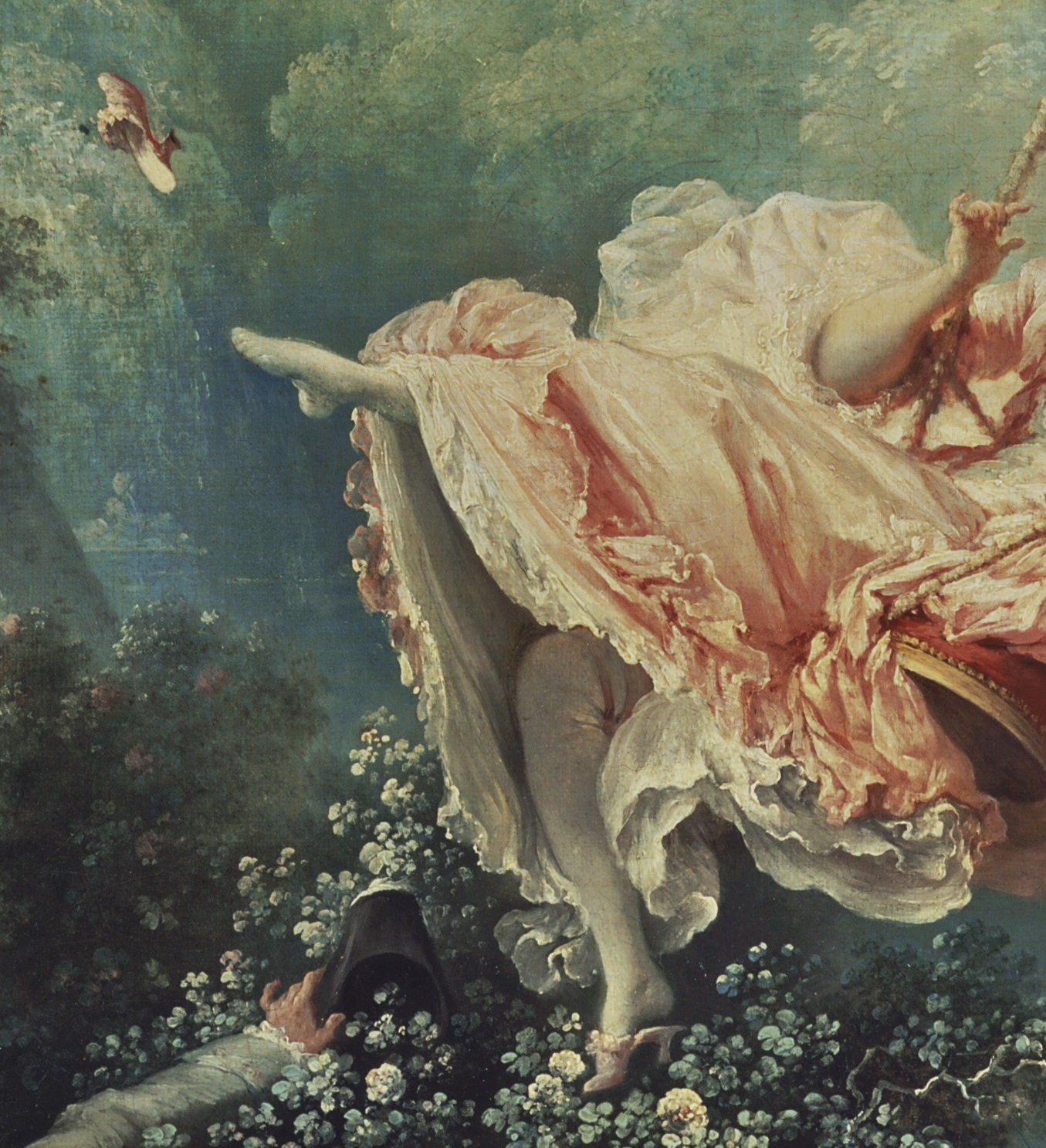
The flying mule from Fragonard's Happy Accidents of the Swing (c. 1768)

Mules of the 16th century to the 19th century were bedroom or boudoir slippers worn inside and not out in public. Accordingly, mules were worn with dressing gowns and typically matched the loose outfits by having the same comfort. The early mules did not have any distinguishable features.

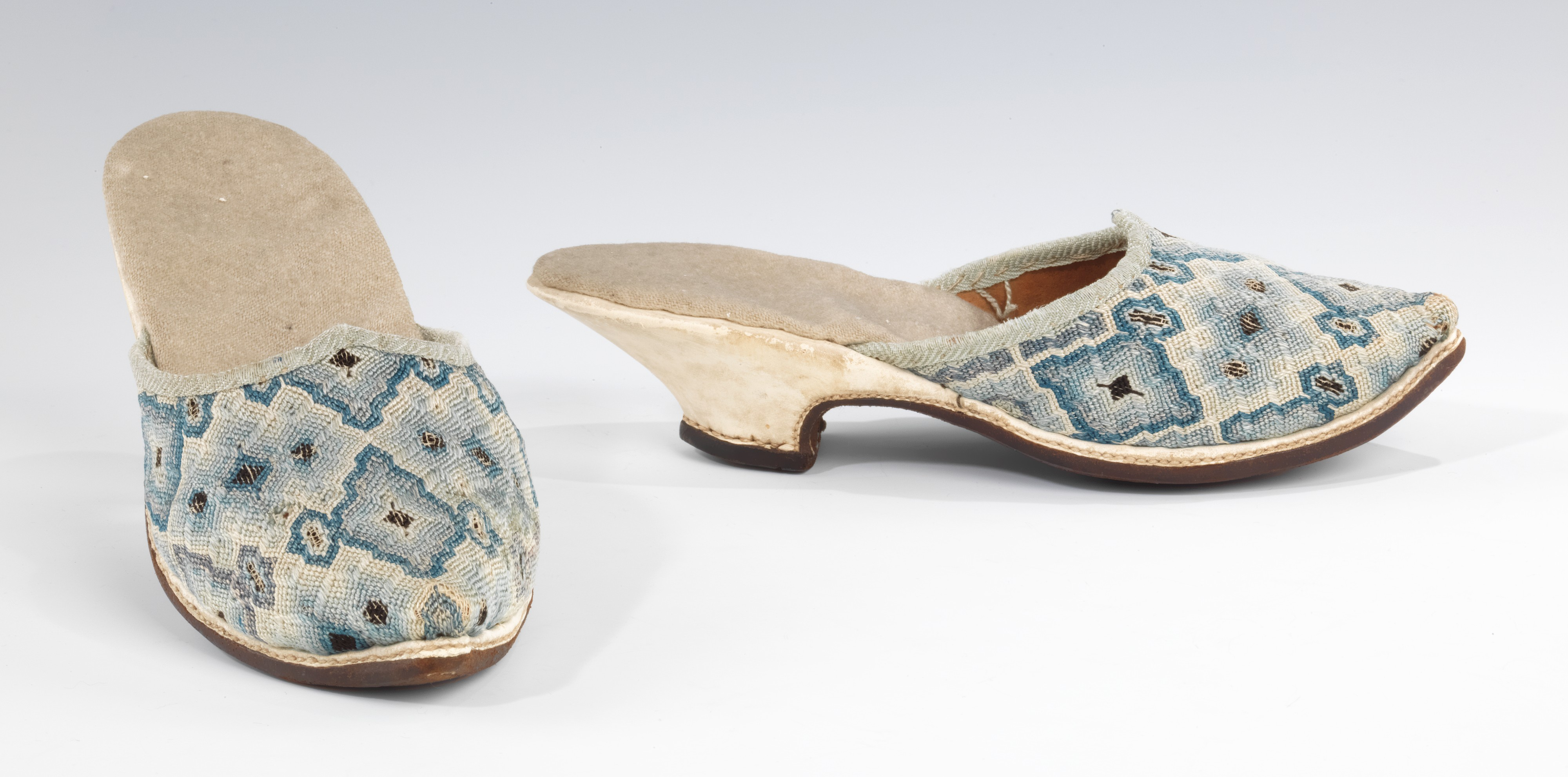
18th century embroidered mule

The popularity of the design increased after the Comtesse d'Olonne wore red mules to church in 1694.

While mules have been worn since the 15th century to the present day, their popularity has not always been constant. They were typical indoor shoes for both men and women in the early 1700s. By the 1720s to the end of the century, mules were the most popular indoor slipper. Fashion plates that exist from the end of the 1790s describe women wearing mules but are not seen due to the long lengths of the contemporary petticoats. Therefore, they were popular by the end of the 1700 but not as visible. In the beginning of the 1800s mules went out of style. In the mid to early 1800s, they rose in popularity again.

During the mid-19th century, mules were primarily designed as comfortable indoor shoes, but may have seen some outdoor use anyways.

"Ballin' The Jack," also known as a Spring-o-Lator mule, attributed to the Herbert Levine Company, where an elastic strip in the footbed that bridged the ball of the foot to the arch, allowed the wearer to keep the shoes securely on while wearing stockings, despite the lack of any straps at the side or back of the shoes. Through much of the 1950s and 1960s a wide range of shoe designers used Herbert Levine's Spring-o-Lator technology in their shoe lines.

In the late 20th century, mules were again in fashion as they embraced the trends. They were especially popular during the end of the 1990s in the high-fashion as elite designers put their own touch on the mule.

Most recently, Elle magazine called mules the shoe of 2017.

== Styles ==
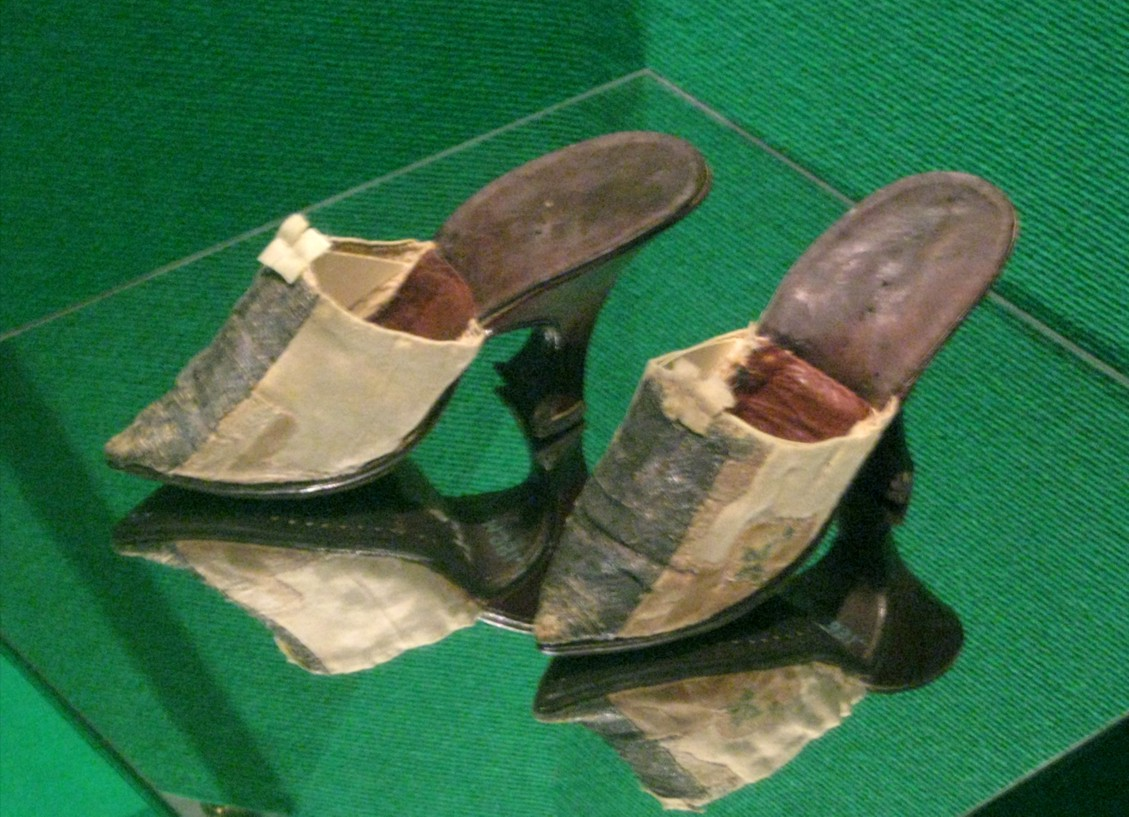
18th century high heel mules of Catherine the Great, 1770s

Mules have changed in style over time. In the fifteenth century mules from Venice were stilted and resembled chopines. Their toes were of all shapes: round, square and forked. The heel similarly was not constrained in height. Heels ranged from 1 5/8 inches to 2 ½ inches. Mules were embroidered across centuries from 1550 to 1700. For example, Florentine embroidery, which is a flame stitch of various lengths, was popular during the 18th century. Throughout the 1700s, mules were regularly heeled and worn by both men and women. Between 1720 and 1790 the shoe structure itself was relatively dull and boring not to distract from eye-catchy buckles. By 1850s, heeled mules were less frequent for men. From 1885 to 1910, the trend of large buckles and elaborate trims was replaced by less decorated low heeled leather and felt shoes.

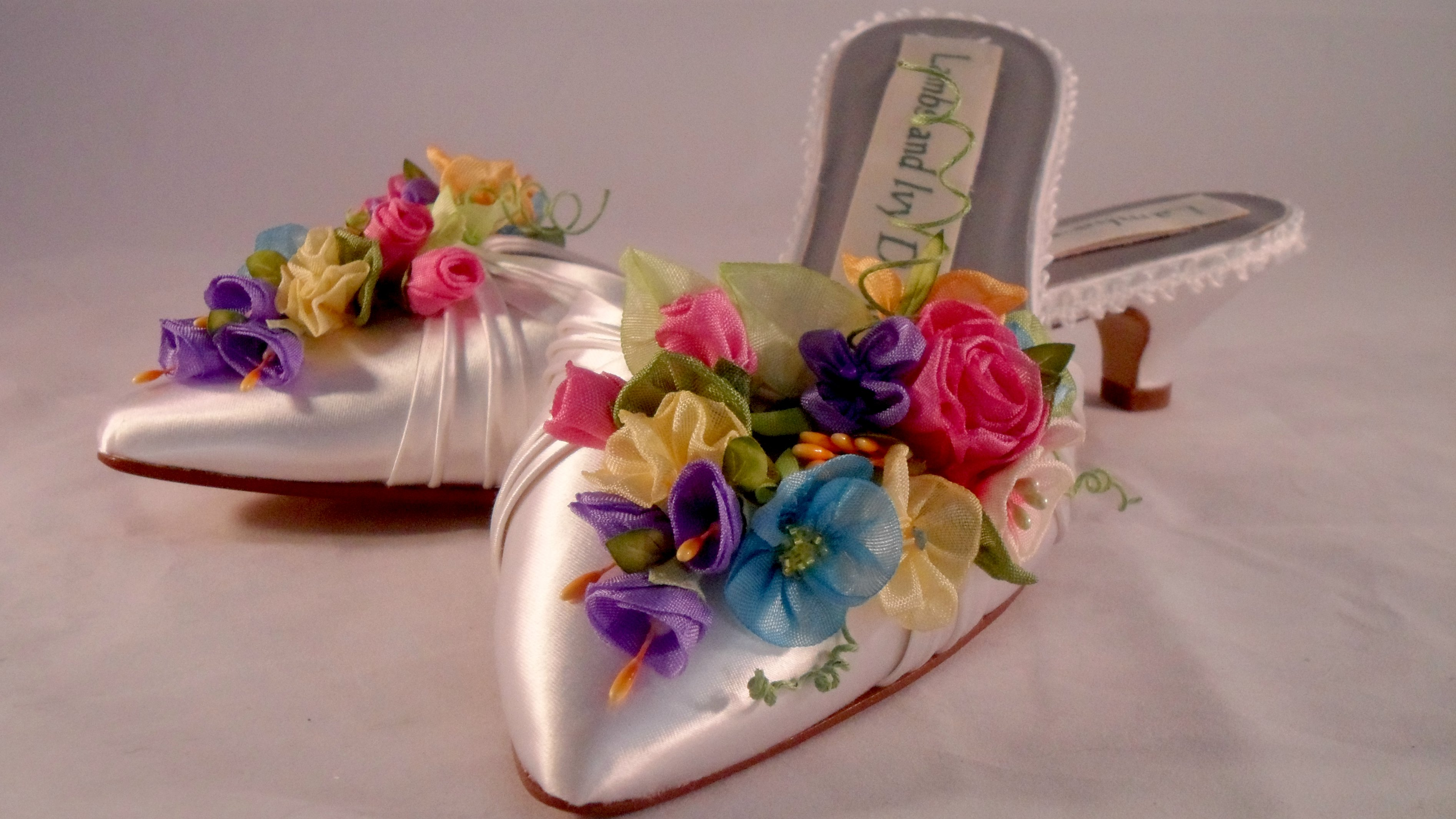
Mules decorated in the fashion of the 1980s

In the twentieth century wartime mules of the 1940s were made of lino, oilcloth, felt, compounds of raffia, rattan, bark or synthetic hemp. 1950s mules were made from plastic and decorated with feathers. The marabou mule promoted the time periods "sex-kitten" ideals. The styles for mules in the 1960s and in the 1980s mirrored the shoe trends of their respective decades. For the 1960s, mules had angular shapes and pointy toes. In the 1980s, this meant that mules were colorful, opulent, and highly accessorized with jewels.

=== Mules for men ===
Mules not only came in different styles and various decorations, but also can be categorized by distinct types. In the nineteenth century, two male slippers were very popular mules. In the late 1880s, a very popular version of the mule at the time in England was the Albert. In addition to the Albert, the Alfred was also a man's boudoir, or morning slipper. This name comes from Daniel Green and Company 1892's "Alfred Dolge's Felt Slippers and Shoes."

== Mules in the East ==
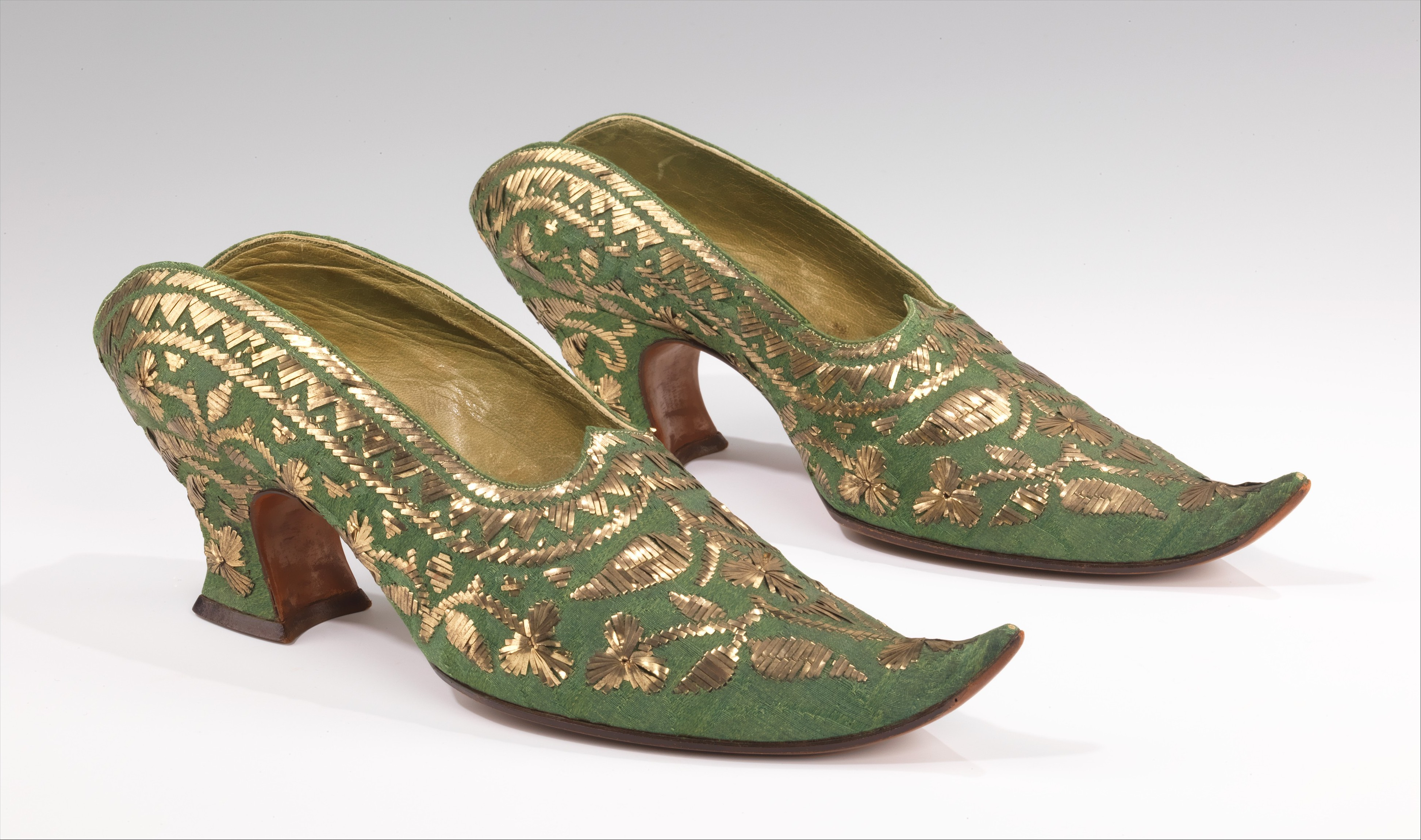
Early 20th century mule by Pierre Yantorny inspired by "the east".

Mules also appear in eastern cultures. This history is similarly rich originating from the 800s and still present today. In eighth century Egypt, mules are depicted on gravestones and seem to be made of red kid. Iranian mules from 1800 to 1889 were made of velvet, leather, silk, metal thread. They are shaped like a fish. A mule from Turkey in the Metropolitan Museum's collection is made of wood, leather, metal, and silk. Mules from India were made from cow, buffalo or goat hide, fur, silk, wool, or cotton fiber, velvets, brocade and reeds and grass. Similar to the European examples, mules in India were embroidered and embellished with tassels and appliqué. In South Asia, a jutti is a type of shoe that is similar to the mule because it does not have backs. Sometimes, mules resemble Turkish babouche because of the use of Near Eastern fabrics. For example, Pierre Yantorny's mules designed for Rita de Acosta Lydig are made of an identical to other Near Eastern footwear. She potentially wore these shoes with a harem dress, further illustrating Eastern culture.

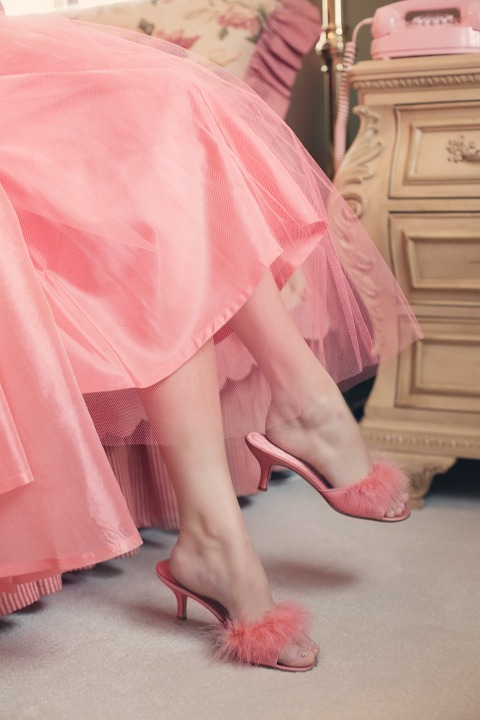
Marabou mules, similar to those worn by Marilyn Monroe and other celebrities in the 1950s

== In popular culture ==
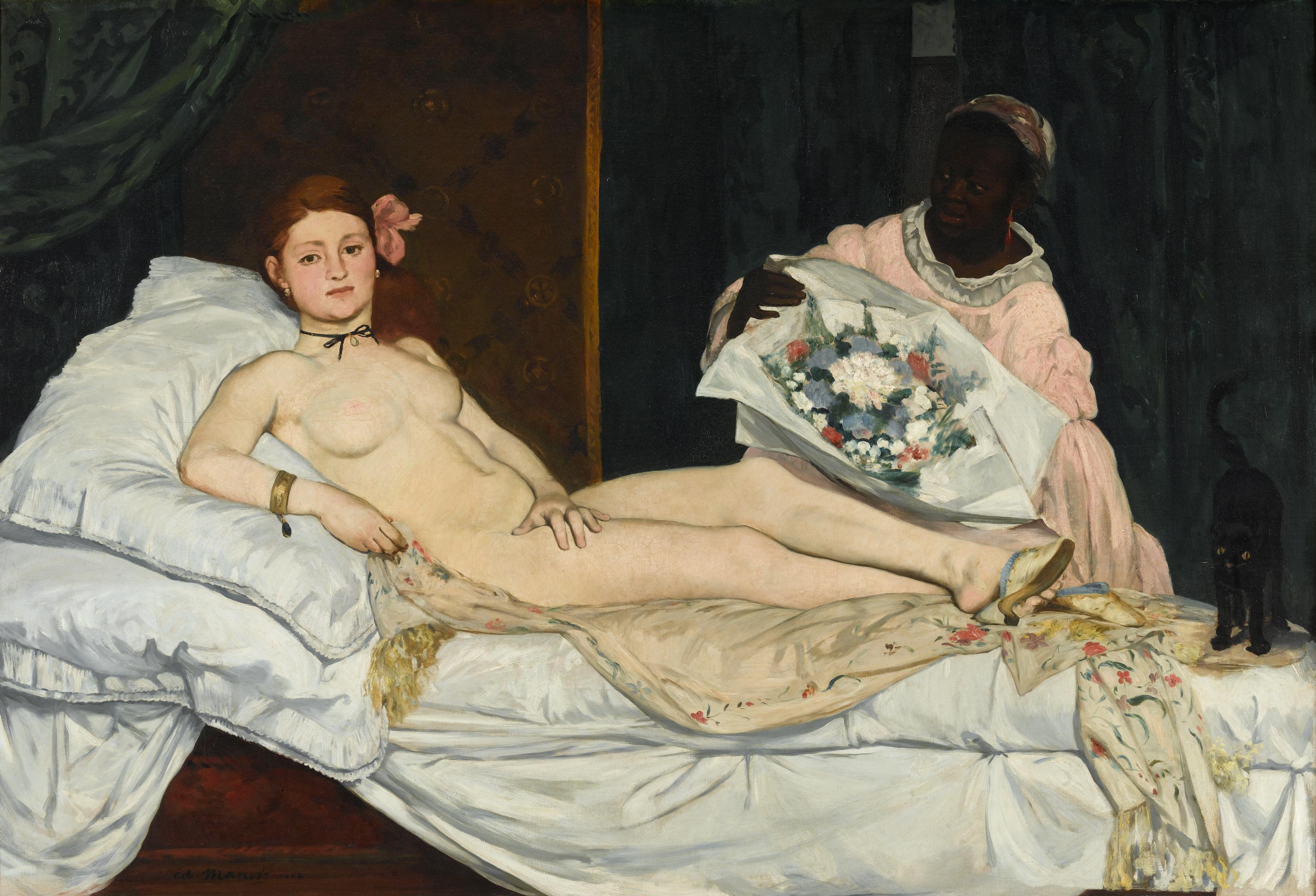
Manet's Olympia. The subject is wearing a pair of mules.

Mules have been associated with several celebrities. Queen Henrietta Maria, wife of Charles I famously wore an embroidered pair of mules in the 17th century. In Édouard Manet's 1863 painting Olympia, the central woman wears mules in bed. Her shoes connect to a type of slipper (chausson), which was slang for "old prostitute". During the 1950s, iconic actresses like Marilyn Monroe, Joan Fontaine, and Jayne Russel wore the marabou mules in their films and daily lives. For example, Marilyn Monroe wore them in The Seven Year Itch. Carrie Bradshaw from Sex and the City frequently wore mules. In Marie Claire's list of the top 32 Carrie Bradshaw shoes, six pairs are mules.

In 2017, many celebrities and models were sighted wearing versions of the mules. Gigi Hadid designed a mule for Stuart Weitzman's spring 2017 collection. Beyoncé's Instagram post of her wearing Givenchy mules received over 2 million likes. Gucci's Princetown loafer is a version of a mule worn by both men and women. In 2015, a version of this shoe was lined with kangaroo fur, which stirred anti fur activists. These shoes were snapped on celebrities' social media platforms from Marc Jacobs to Leandra Medine of Man Repeller. In 2024, Cristiano Ronaldo's girlfriend, Georgina Rodriguez, combined two major shoe trends in one mule at the Venice Film Festival.

== Gallery ==
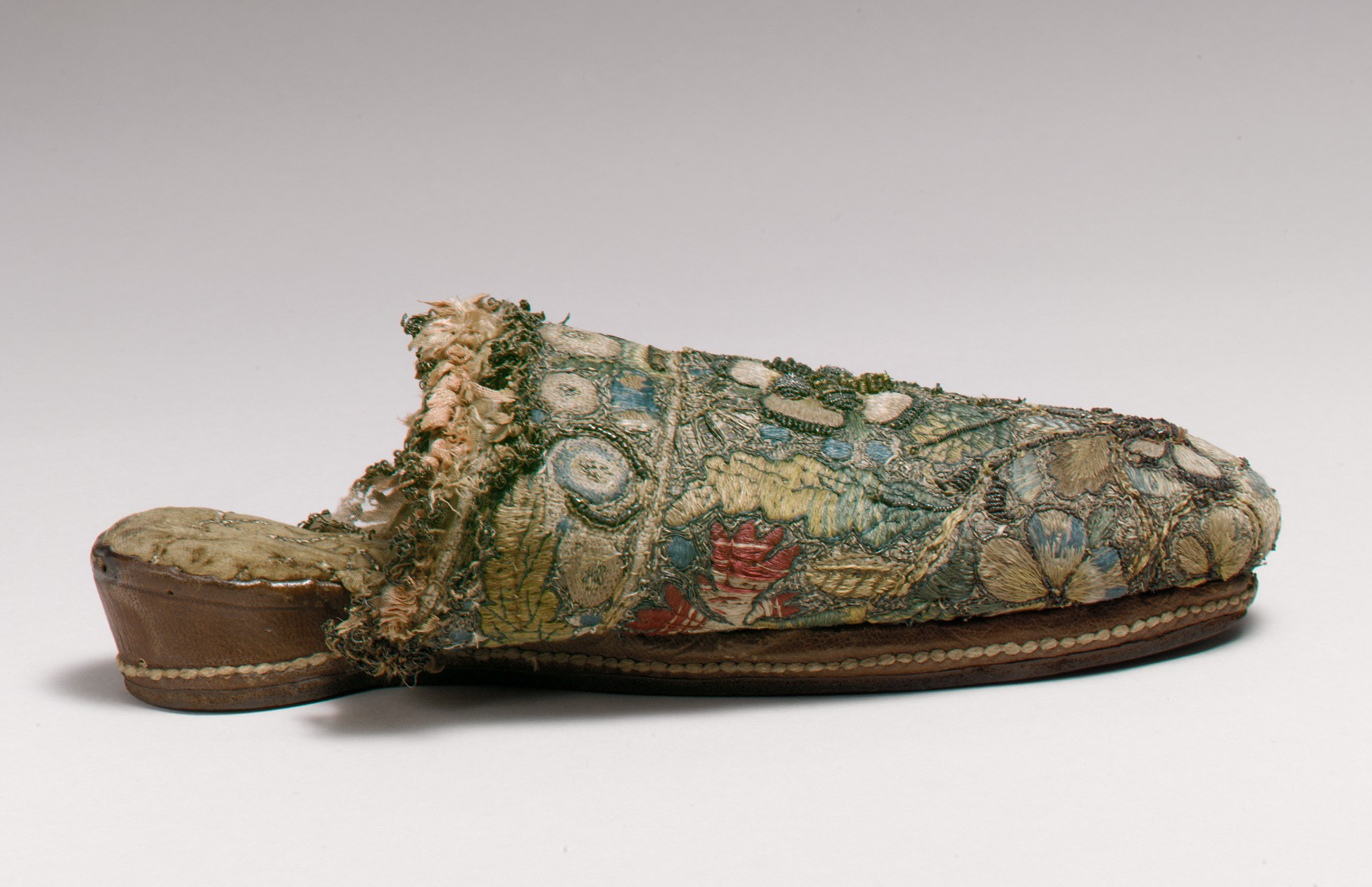
Early 17th century mule

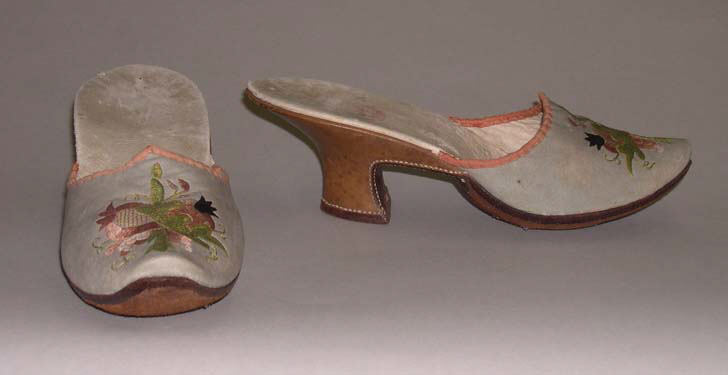
1750 Mules made of silk

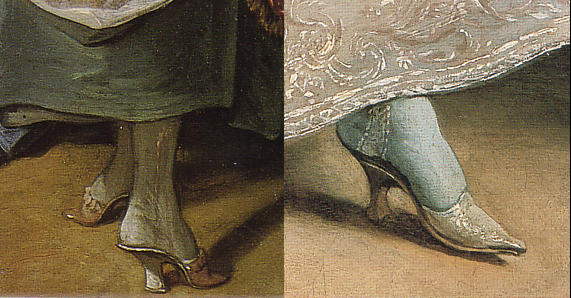
18th century mules

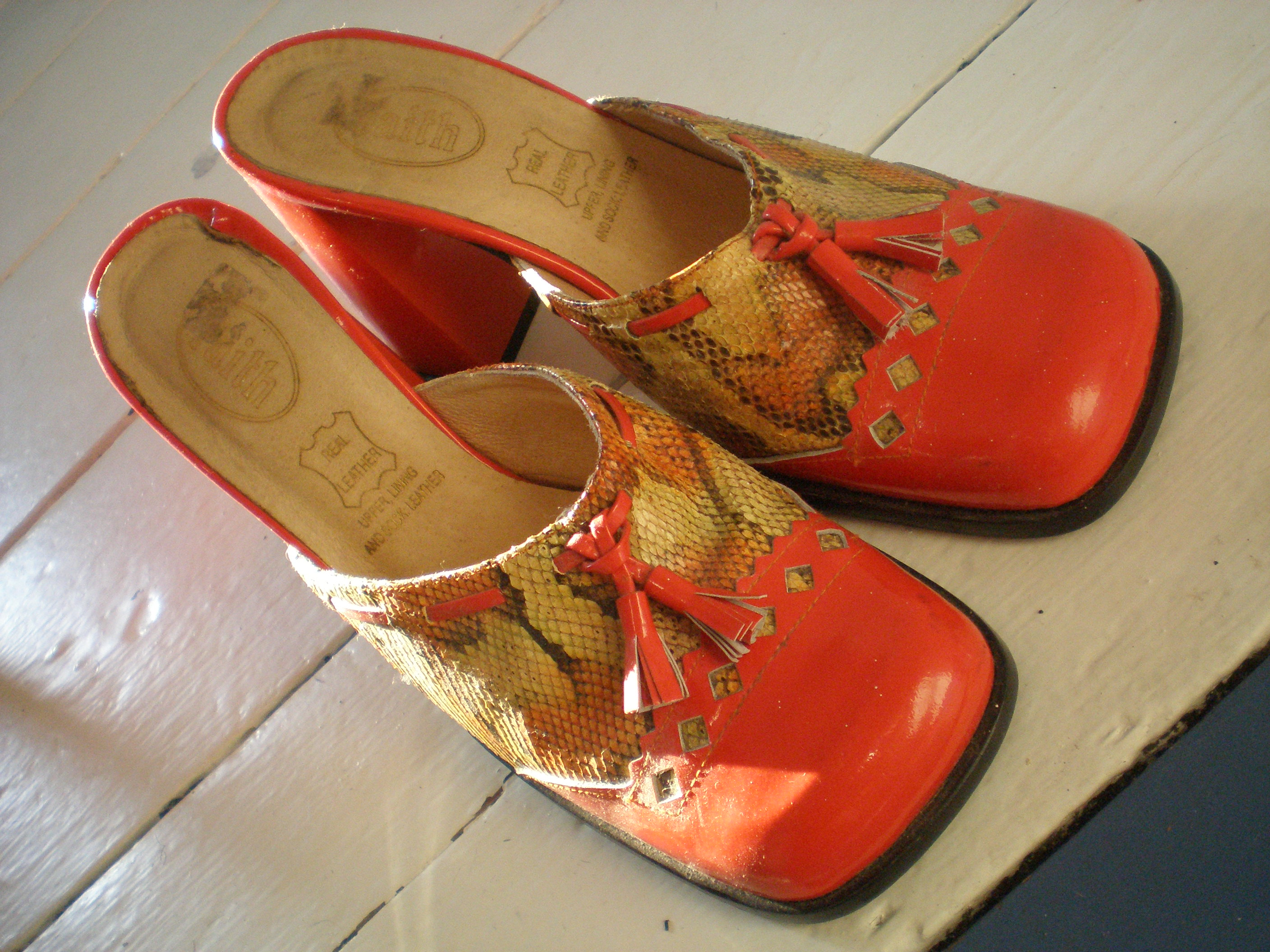
Red and animal skin high heeled mules

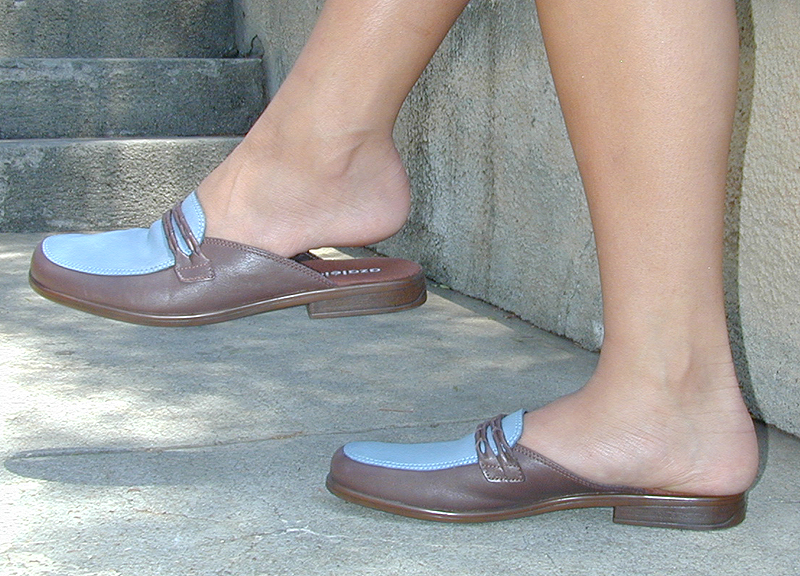
Woman's loafer style mules with a flat heel

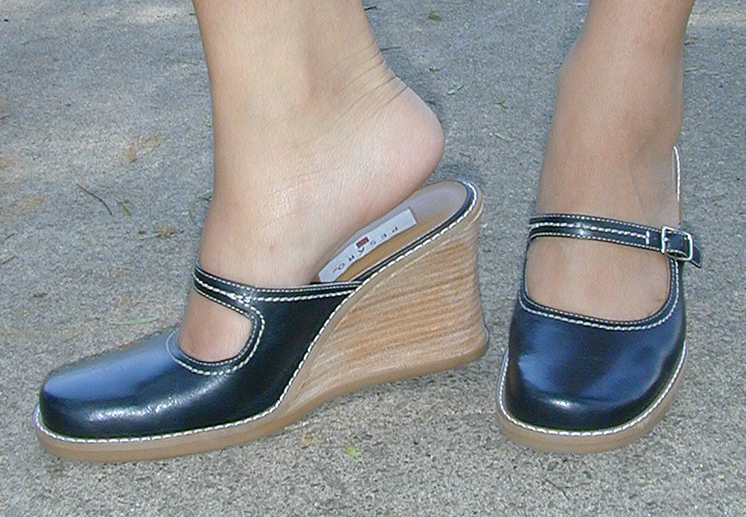
Woman's Maryjane style mules with a wedge heel

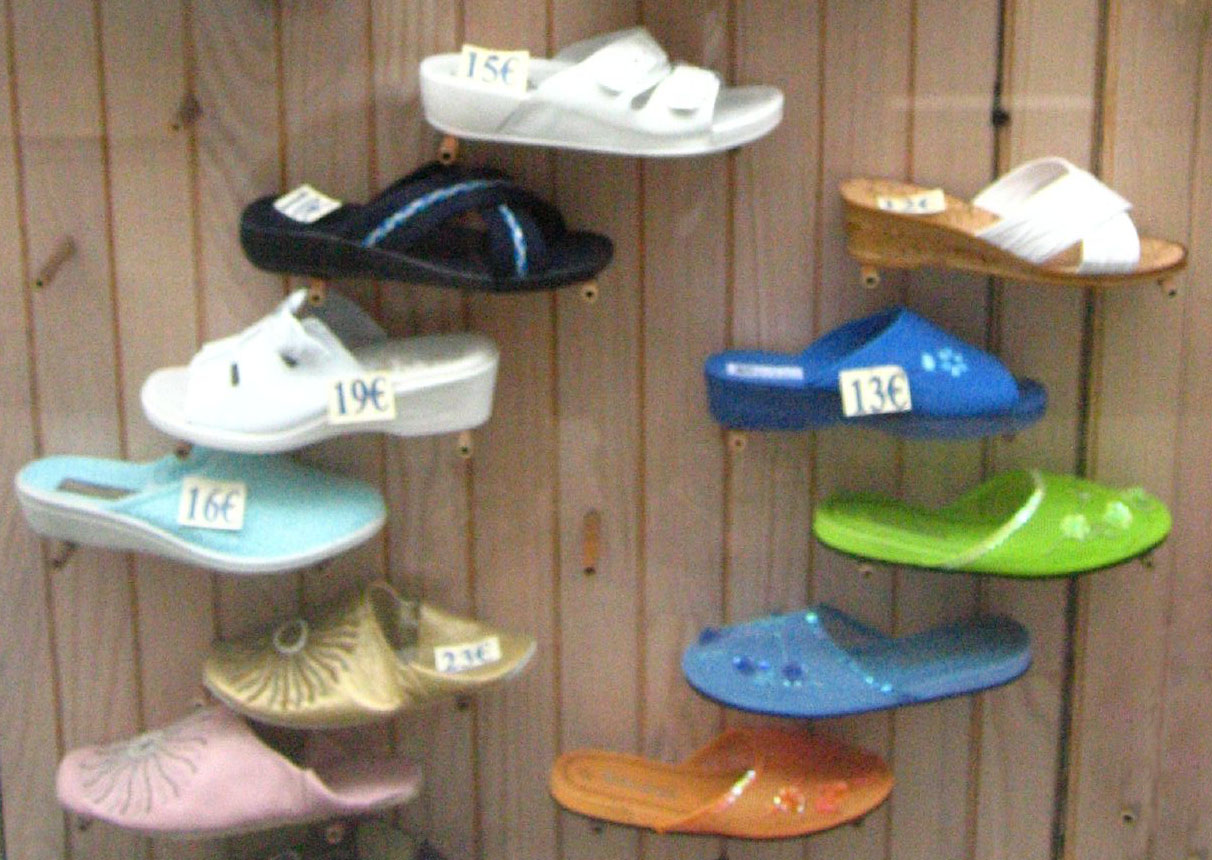
Various styles of mules in a shop window

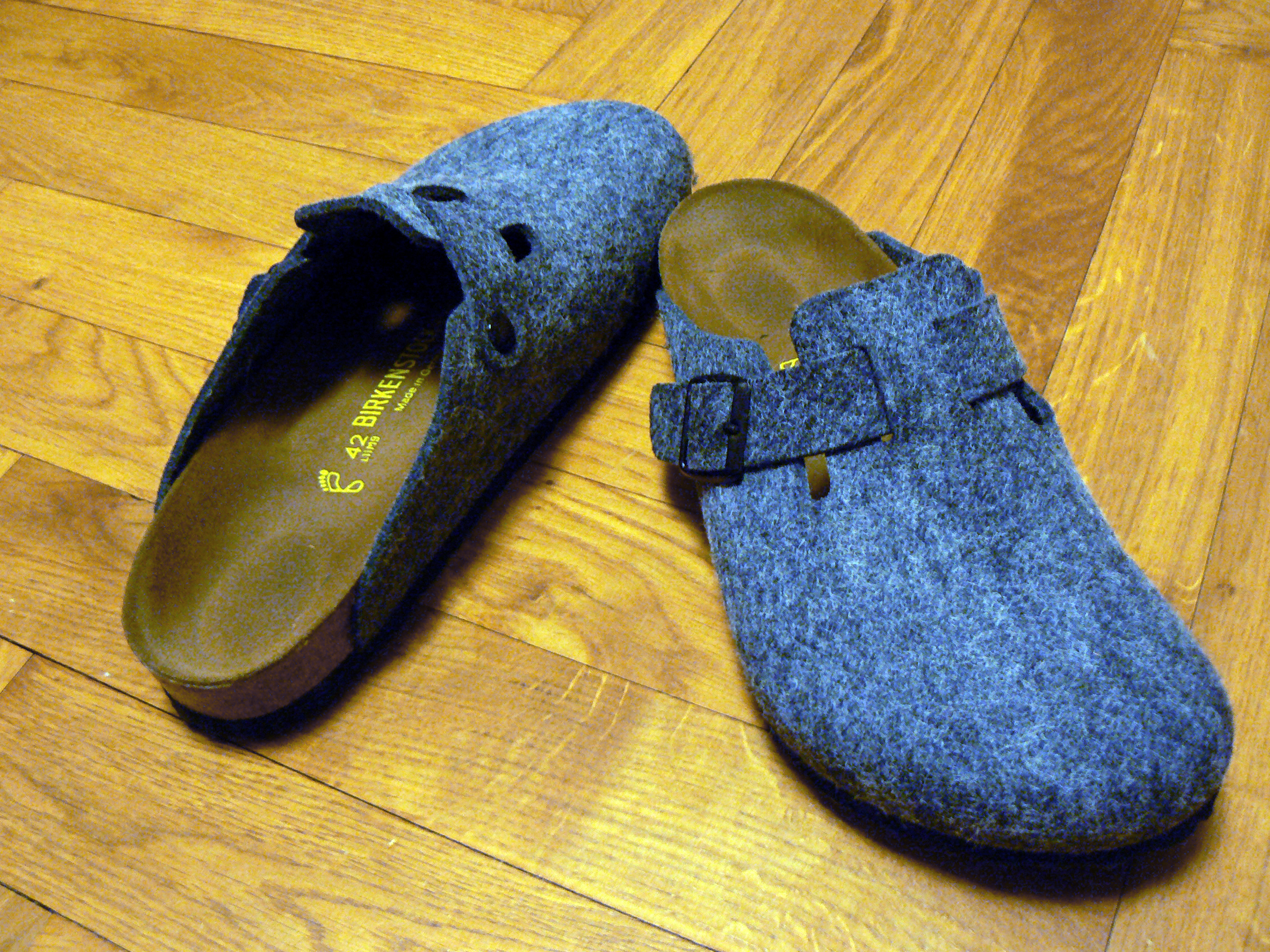
Birkenstock mules

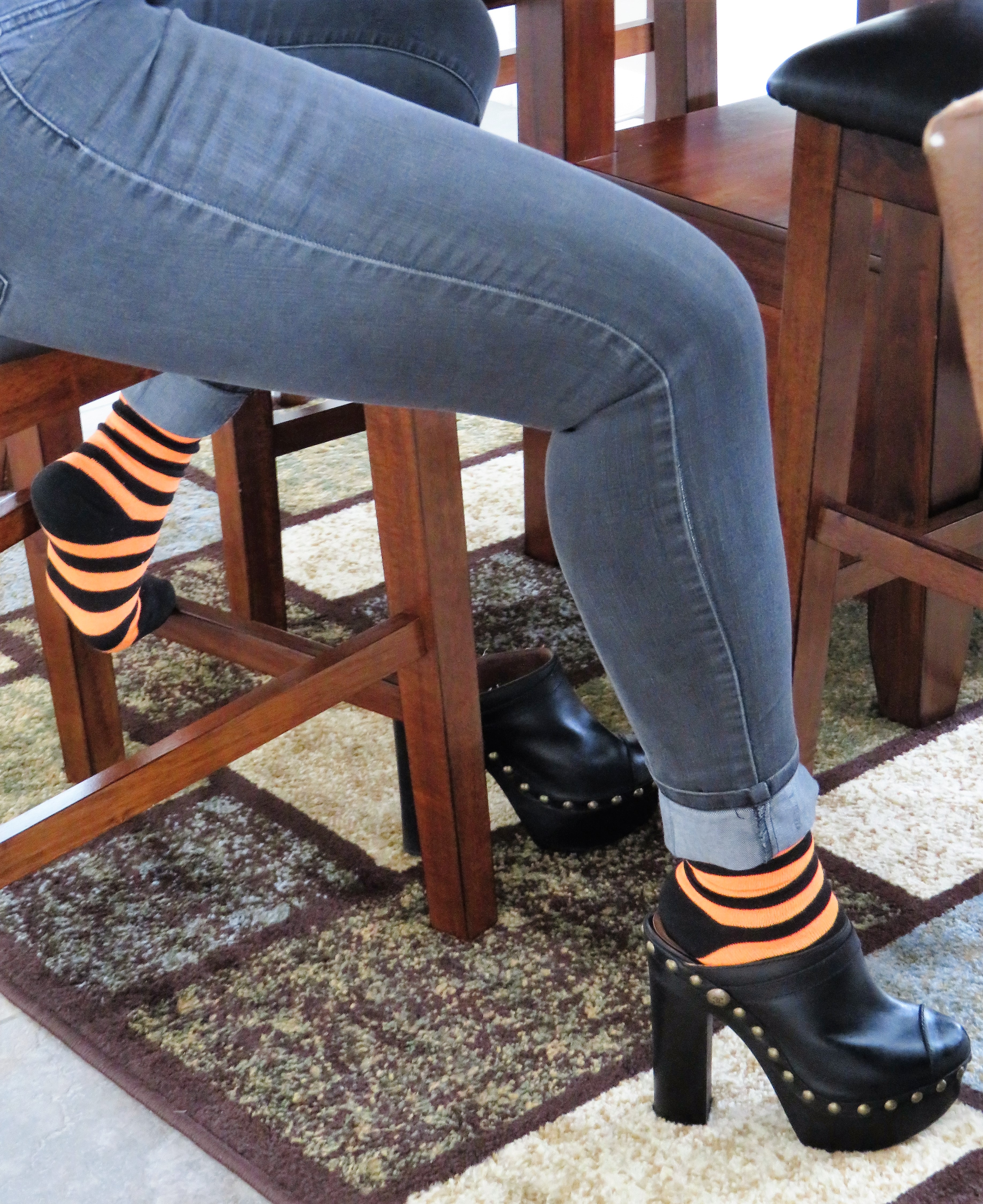
High heeled and studded mule

== See also ==
- List of shoe styles
