= Beth Levine (fashion designer) =

American fashion designer

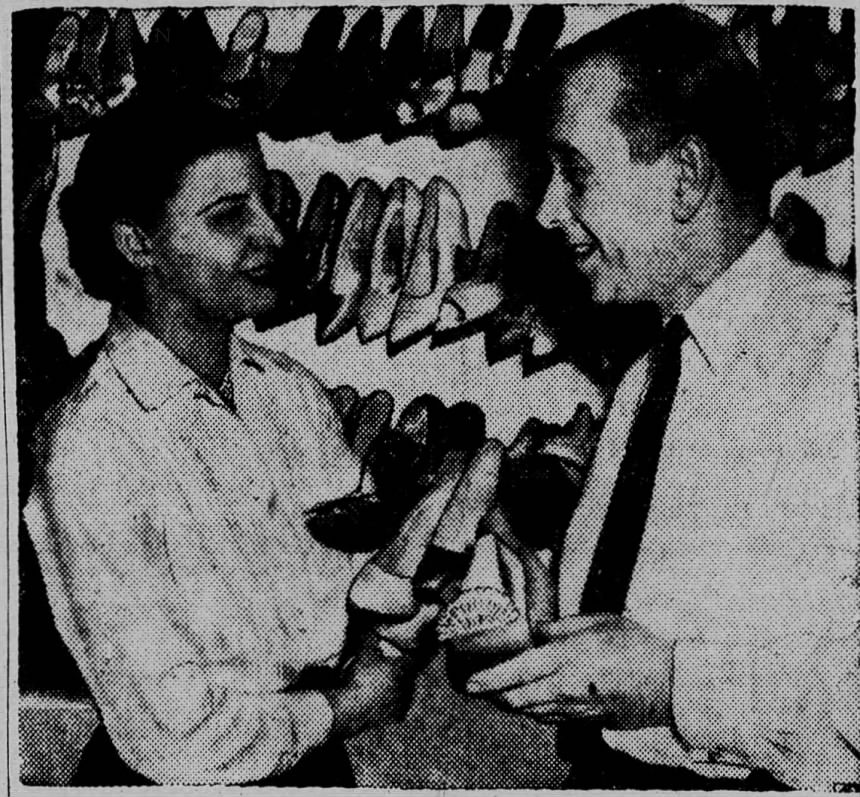
Beth Levine

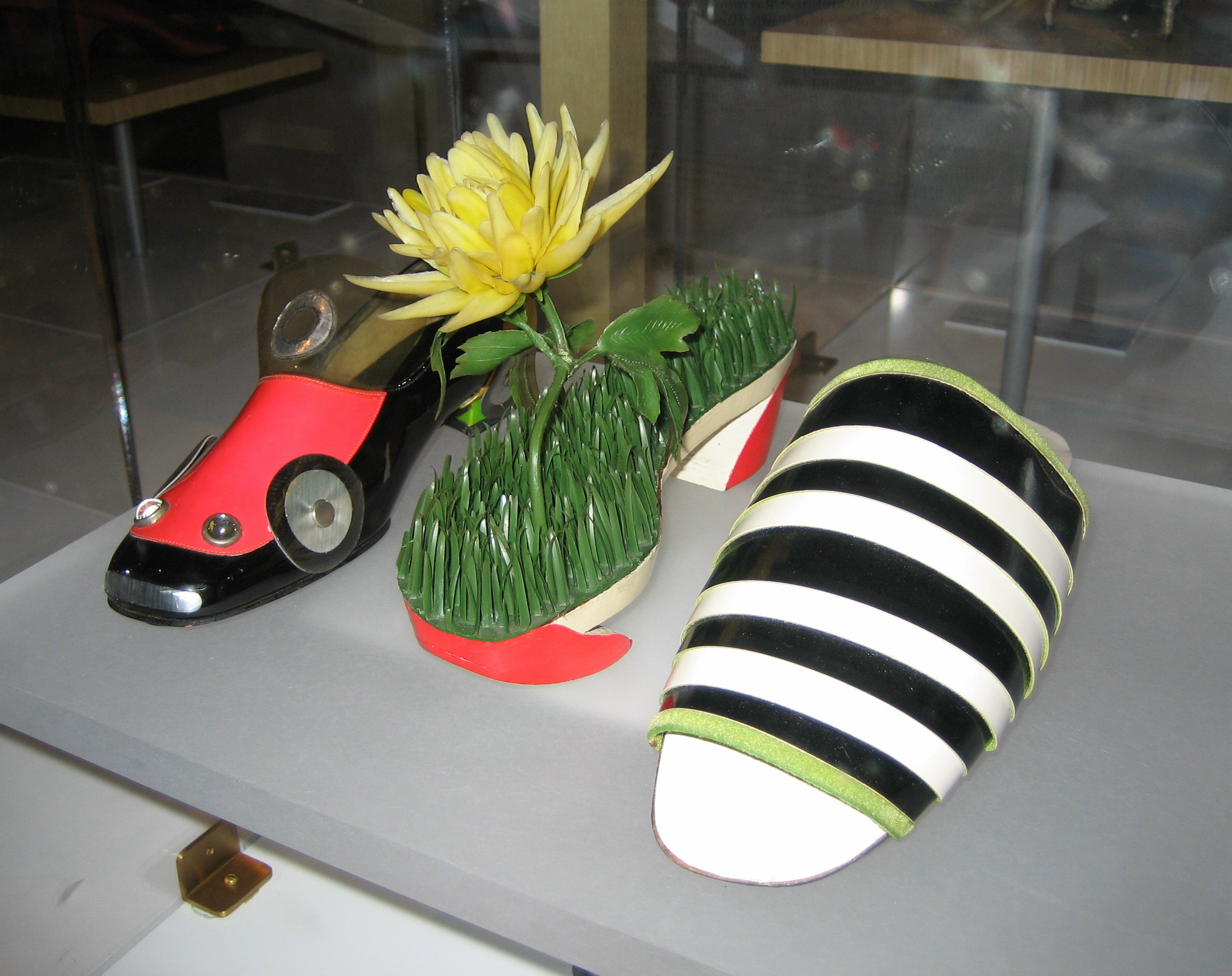
Shoes by Beth Levine

Beth Levine (December 31, 1914 – September 20, 2006) was an American fashion designer most known for her designs from the 1940s through the 1970s.

Under the Herbert Levine label, bearing the name of her husband, Herbert Levine, Beth was the best-known American women's shoe designer from the 1950s to the early 1970s, and was called "America's First Lady of Shoe Design" until her death in 2006.

== Beginnings ==
She was born as Elizabeth Katz in Patchogue, New York, the third of five children of Anna and Israel Katz, Lithuanian Jewish emigrants who operated a dairy farm. In the 1930s, she moved to Manhattan and found work as a shoe model, then worked her way up from a stylist to head designer for I. Miller. She served as a Red Cross volunteer during World War II.

== Design career ==
Beth Levine met Herbert Levine when she applied for a job designing shoes for another shoe manufacturer in 1944, and married him three months later. In 1948, they founded the Herbert Levine label together.

Beth Levine's greatest influence is considered to be the re-introduction of boots to women's fashion in the 1960s and the popularization of the shoe style known as mules. When Nancy Sinatra wore Levine boots in publicity shots for the 1960s hit song "These Boots Are Made for Walkin'", demand for fashion boots leaped so much that Saks Fifth Avenue opened a special section its shoe department called "Beth's Bootery".

Levine was hired in 1965, along with famed couturier Emilio Pucci and designer Alexander Girard, to help overhaul a new look and style for Braniff International Airways. The campaign, developed by Jack Tinker and Partner's Mary Wells Lawrence, was dubbed The End Of The Plain Plane, and was a revolutionary airline overhaul, which had never been attempted. Levine designed the unique shoes that complemented the Pucci uniform designs.

== Innovations ==
Fashion innovations introduced by Beth Levine for the Herbert Levine label include boots as Haute Couture, "Spring-o-lator" mules (where an elastic strip allowed the wearer to keep the shoes securely on while wearing stockings despite the lack of any straps at the side or back of the shoes), stocking boots (pantyhose with heels attached, as well as boots made from materials like vinyl and acrylic) and clear plastic shoes.

Beth was an early feminist in the fashion industry.

== Awards ==
Beth Levine was awarded the Coty Award in 1967 for design innovation.

== Collections ==
Levine's designs are included in the Metropolitan Museum of Art.

== Death ==
Beth Levine died in Manhattan of lung cancer on September 20, 2006, aged 91, survived by a daughter, Anna Thomson-Wilson, also of Manhattan, and grandsons H Hugo Thomson and William Davidson Thomson 3rd.
