= Herbert Levine (physicist) =

American biophysicist

Herbert Levine is an American physicist, a University Distinguished Professor of Physics and Bioengineering at Northeastern University. He is also co-director of a National Science Foundation Physics Frontier Center devoted to theoretical biological physics. His research focuses on physical modeling of cancer progression, metastasis and interaction with the immune system.

== Education and career ==
Levine studied at MIT and Princeton University, earning his doctorate in 1979. After postdoctoral studies at Harvard, he joined Schlumberger-Doll Research in Connecticut where he studied the physics of pattern formation. His work led to some famous discoveries about crystal pattern formation providing a working mathematics for tying together the forces that stabilize the growing patterns and the forces that destabilize them. His work on snowflakes gained Levine notoriety both within the academic world and outside of it.

Levine left Schlumberger-Doll and moved to the University of California, San Diego in 1987. He joined Rice University as a Professor and the Hasselman Chair of Bioengineering in 2011, before joining Northeastern in 2019.

== Recognition ==
Levine was elected as a Fellow of the American Physical Society (APS) in 1993, after a nomination from the APS Division of Condensed Matter Physics, "for the development of a new theoretical approach to interfacial pattern formation, leading to new understanding of dendritic growth, fingering instabilities and fractal structures". He was elected to of the American Academy of Arts and Sciences and the National Academy of Sciences in 2011.
