= Herbert Levine (company) =

American luxury shoe label

- Founded: 1948
- Founder: Herbert and Beth Levine
- Headquarters: New York
- Products: Shoes
- Website: www.herbertlevine.com

Herbert Levine is an American luxury shoe label founded in 1948 by Herbert Levine and his wife Beth.

== History ==
The Herbert Levine label was named after former journalist Herbert. His wife, Beth, was the primary shoe designer of the label. She designed the footwear while Herbert handled the factory management, sales, and marketing.

Herbert Levine, Inc. established its first factory on 31 West 31st Street in New York in January 1949. The factory started with a production of 400 pairs of shoes a week; by 1954, it had 200 employees producing 5,000 pair of shoes a week. In 1975, Herbert Levine, Inc. was still making 900 pairs of shoes a day.

Herbert Levine shoes were distributed in numerous boutiques and high-end department stores across the United States and Canada, including Neiman Marcus, Saks Fifth Avenue, Joseph and Bonwit Teller. Herbert Levine shoes were also the first American shoes to be carried overseas by retailers such as Galeries Lafayette in Paris and Harrods in London.

Herbert Levine is widely credited as the first label to have introduced boots into Haute Couture. As early as 1953, Herbert Levine introduced a calf-length boot in white kidskin, which sold poorly. Most retailers saw boots as a separate category of footwear from shoes, to be worn for protection from bad weather or for work. By contrast, Herbert Levine argued that boots were shoes and could be an integral part of a woman's outfit. In 1957, Herbert Levine produced an entire collection built around fashion boots, and despite widespread skepticism on the part of other designers and manufacturers, calf-high, kitten-heeled fashion boots for women began to grow in popularity in the late 1950s and early 1960s.

In the 1950s, Herbert Levine advertisements were drawn by famous New York illustrator Saul Steinberg and were regularly published in The New Yorker and in Harper's Bazaar. In 1980, Andy Warhol photographed a series of Herbert Levine shoes.

Mr. and Mrs. Levine were hired in 1965, along with famed couturier Emilio Pucci and designer Alexander Girard, to help overhaul a new look and style for Braniff International Airways. The campaign, developed by Jack Tinker and partner Mary Wells Lawrence, was dubbed The End Of The Plain Plane, and was a revolutionary airline overhaul that had never before been attempted. The campaign was considered one of the most successful advertising and image reworks in history.

Closed in 1975, the label was revived in 2025 through a partnership between heritage brand investment company Luvanis, Milan- and New York-based distributor Massimo Bonini, and former Dsquared2 CEO Gianfranco Maccarrone, with footwear designer Trevor Houston appointed as creative director. Houston—previously head of footwear at Khaite after positions at Marc Jacobs, Coach, The Row and Tory Burch, and an avid collector of vintage Herbert Levine pieces—was identified by the new owners through interviews discussing his personal archive. The first collection debuted at New York Fashion Week in February 2025 and reached stores in September, including Saks Fifth Avenue, Harrods, Le Bon Marché and Mytheresa; production was relocated to Italy's Marche region, and the inaugural campaigns were photographed by Mark Borthwick.

== Description ==
The Herbert Levine label gained media notoriety for outlandish designs: gilded wood platforms, slippers with newspaper, money, or candy-wrapper covered fabrics, Astroturf insoles, and shoes that were glued onto the wearer's nylon stockings. Herbert Levine's greatest influence was re-introducing boots to women's fashion in the 1960s and the popularization of the shoe style known as mules.

Several major fashion designers have publicly acknowledged Beth Levine's influence on their work. Manolo Blahnik called her "without a doubt the most influential American shoe designer of the 20th century," adding: "She is to shoes what Eames is to furniture." Christian Louboutin described her as "an influential free spirit" whose "refreshing work" came "from pure fun and pleasure." Azzedine Alaïa, for whom Beth Levine designed several shoes over the years, called her "one of the most important people working in shoes," with designs that were "highly imaginative, strong and modern."

== Designs ==
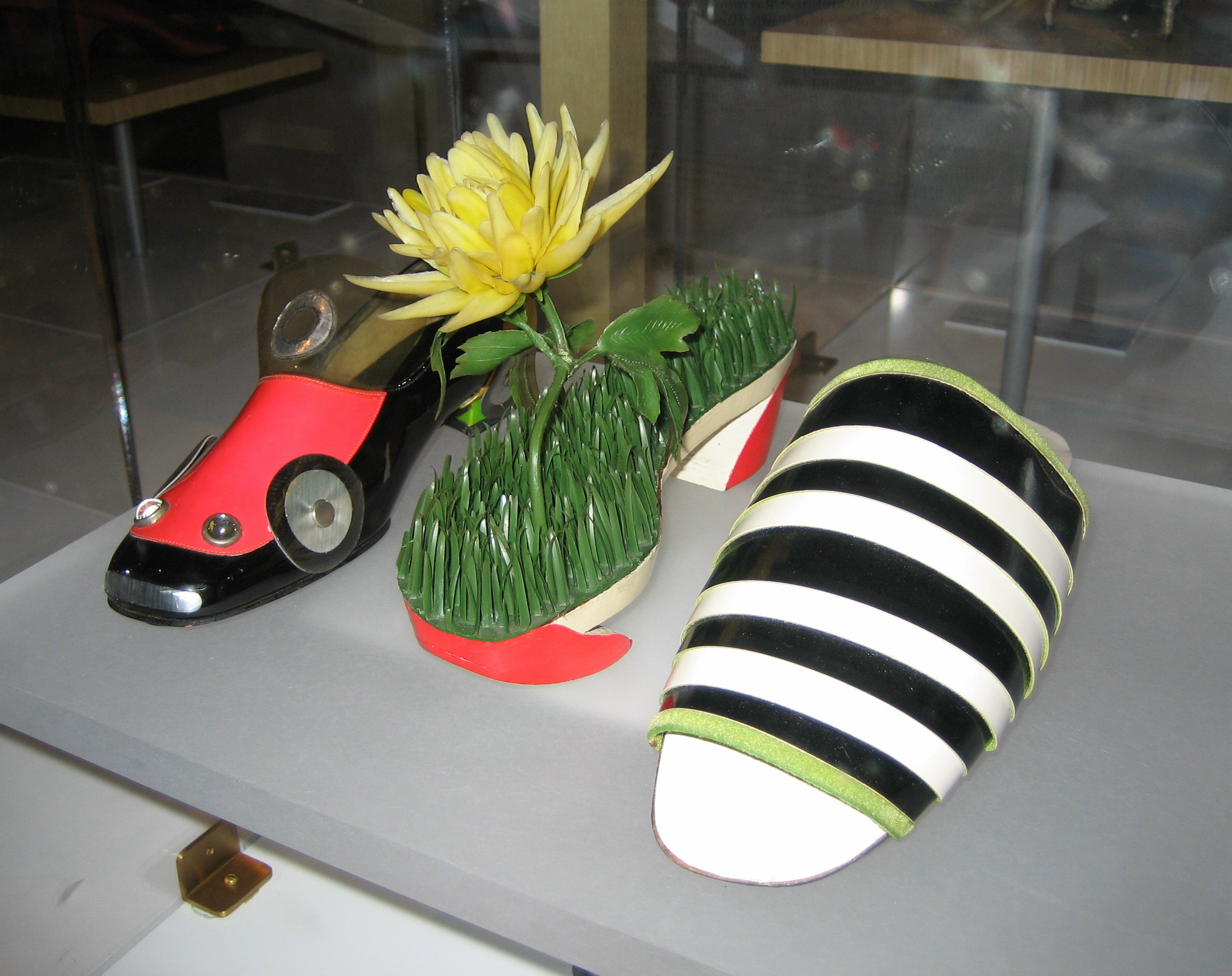
Herbert Levine's "Race Car Shoe," "Barefoot in the Grass," and "Paper Twist" shoes

- On A Roll (1952). The shoe's unusual rolled heel is a highlight of the label.
- Ballin' The Jack / Spring-o-Lator (1952). Mules in which an elastic strip allowed the wearer to keep the shoes securely on while wearing stockings, despite the lack of any straps at the side or back of the shoes. Through much of the 1950s and 1960s a wide range of shoe designers used Herbert Levine's Spring-o-Lators in their own shoe lines.
- No-Shoe (1957). This unique design reduced footwear to its most essential element — the sole — which was treated as a decorative abstract shape. The topless shoes were designed on a dare from Stanley Marcus. While they were in fact functional (secured to the foot with adhesive pads), the form has more importance as a theoretical exercise than as a significant fashion. The "No-Shoe" was the culmination of the brand's exploration of the transparent shoe concept, spearheaded by the Cinderella shoe; the effect is of a bared, tiptoeing foot — nature supported by artifice.
- Aladdin's Lamp (1959). Emulating the shape of Aladdin's magic oil lamp, this shoe was designed by Beth Levine at the request of Diana Vreeland, then fashion editor of Harper's Bazaar, who wanted a shoe with a low heel, turned up at the toe, open yet closed, and with jewels on it.
- Barefoot in the Grass (1966). The "Barefoot in the Grass" sandals — made of an AstroTurf insole, a vinyl vamp, and a green kid heel — were a witty use of contemporary and unexpected materials. When those sandals were worn, the grass was supposed to go with you.
- Race Car Shoe (1967). First designed for the wife of one of the drivers in the 1967 Indianapolis 500, the Race Car Shoe was produced in many versions over the years, including evening shoes with windshields and headlights. It was featured in the 1967 movie Sole Art as well as in a full editorial spread in Harper's Bazaar in March 1967. Prada also drew inspiration from classic American cars for its Spring 2012 shoe collection — the resulting hot-rod heels with headlights and chrome bore a striking resemblance to Levine's Race Car Shoe.
- Paper Twist (1967). Appearing in a special feature of Harper's Bazaar (July 1967), "Paper Twist" shoes were designed by Kathryn Stoll for Herbert Levine. The series was composed of brightly colored, double-faced laminated paper strips twisted into exquisite swirls and multicolour bands that flexed on composition soles.
- Scarf Shoe (1968). Immortalized by a legendary photograph by Guy Bourdin published in Harper's Bazaar in 1968, the "Scarf Shoe" is an iconic model of the Herbert Levine line. Each "Scarf Shoe" — a free-flowing stocking based on a solid sole — covered the leg with long streamers in yards of silk chiffon, wrapping the body upward from a jewelled heel.
- Lunar Boot (1969). A series of space-age boots created to coincide with the landing of Apollo 11 on the moon on July 20, 1969. The Lunar Boot was made of reflective space-suit material — a collaboration between Beth Levine and Sara Little Turnbull, an innovative product designer who was then collaborating with NASA.

== Celebrity clients ==
=== First Ladies ===
The house of Herbert Levine served United States First Ladies Jackie Kennedy, Mamie Eisenhower, Lady Bird Johnson, and Patricia Nixon in the 1960s and early 1970s.

Herbert Levine made black velvet knee-high boots for Mamie Eisenhower as well as most of her pumps. For Jackie Kennedy, Herbert Levine custom-made a pair of thigh-high boots in burlap with a stacked heel, as well as many of the flats that became a signature element of the Jackie Kennedy style.

=== Stars and socialites ===
In addition to the popularity of the label with Presidents' wives, Herbert Levine shoes were also a favorite of Broadway stars, movie stars, and socialites. Some of the brand’s famous clients included Barbra Streisand, Marlene Dietrich, Marilyn Monroe, Dinah Shore, Janis Paige, Jane Fonda, Joanne Woodward, Joan Crawford, Lauren Bacall, Barbara Walters, Julie Andrews, Rita Hayworth, Peggy Lee, Cyd Charisse, Joan Collins, Cher, Linda Evans, Babe Paley, Rosemary Clooney, Betty Grable, Gladys Knight, Natalie Wood, Debbie Reynolds, Arlene Francis, Phyllis Diller, Helen Hayes, Chita Rivera, Joan Sutherland, Gwen Verdon, Liv Ullmann, Agnes de Mille, Carol Channing, Ali MacGraw, Barbara Hale, and Angela Lansbury.

Marilyn Monroe wore Herbert Levine shoes both in her private and public life. Visiting Bement on August 9, 1955, Marilyn wore a pair of Herbert Levine's Spring-o-Lators, immortalized by many pictures, notably the series taken by photojournalist Eve Arnold. In 1957, Marilyn purchased Herbert Levine red stilettos (size 7AA) from the Vogue shop in Montreal; those shoes are now part of the Bata Shoe Museum collection in Toronto.

Marlene Dietrich ordered many custom pairs of the so-called "Gigi Stocking Shoes" (in size 7 ^{1/2B}), and inspired the "Marlene Boot" line of the label, named for her famous legs. Joan Crawford was a fan of Herbert Levine's Cinderella shoes. She had those Vinylite shoes custom made by Herbert Levine because "she loved to see her feet."

Following the brand's revival, with Trevor Houston as creative director, contemporary figures who have worn Herbert Levine shoes include Odessa A'zion, Gwendoline Christie, Emilia Clarke, Katie Holmes, Tracee Ellis Ross, Chase Sui Wonders, and Venus Williams.

== In the popular culture ==
- Nancy Sinatra wore Herbert Levine boots for publicity shots and on stage during her period of fame for the song “These Boots Are Made for Walkin'.”
- Shirley MacLaine used Herbert Levine boots for dance numbers in Sweet Charity (1966) and Irma La Douce (1960), as did Eydie Gorme in the Broadway show Golden Rainbow (1968). Raquel Welch wore them in her television variety specials.
- Television character Della Street (portrayed by Barbara Hale) in the popular Perry Mason series often made Herbert Levine' Spring-o-Lators part of her trademark wardrobe.
- Elaine Stritch and all women wore Herbert Levines in Company (1970).
- Lady Bird Johnson, and her daughters, Lynda Bird and Lucy Baines, wore Herbert Levine shoes for Lyndon B. Johnson's 1965 inauguration.
- Patricia Nixon and her daughters, Tricia and Julie, wore Herbert Levine shoes for both Richard Nixon's 1969 and 1973 inauguration balls.

== Awards ==
- 1954: Neiman Marcus Fashion Award for their shoe designs.
- 1967 and 1973: Coty Special Fashion Critics Award

== Museums and Retrospectives ==
=== Herbert Levine in Museums ===
Herbert Levine shoes are in the collections of more than 20 museums around the world, including the Costume Institute at the Metropolitan Museum of Art (which owns around 140 pairs), the Fashion Institute of Technology in New York, the Philadelphia Museum of Art, the Miami Shoe Museum, the Los Angeles County Museum of Art, the ASU FIDM Museum in Los Angeles, the Bata Shoe Museum in Toronto, the Victoria and Albert Museum in London, the Kyoto Costume Institute in Japan, and the Powerhouse Museum in Sydney.

=== Retrospectives on Beth and Herbert Levine ===
- "Herbert Levine," The Costume Institute at the Metropolitan Museum of Art, New York, 1976.
- "Herbert and Beth Levine: An American Pair," The Bata Shoe Museum, Toronto, 1999 and Headley-Whitney Museum, Lexington, Kentucky, 2000.
- "Beth Levine: From Farm to Fashion," Bellport-Brookhaven Historical Society, New York, 2007.
- "Beth Levine: The First Lady of Shoes," Dutch Leather and Shoe Museum, Netherlands, 2009, Bellevue Arts Museum, Seattle, 2010., and Long Island Museum, New York, 2015.
