= Herbert Levine (fashion executive) =

American fashion executive

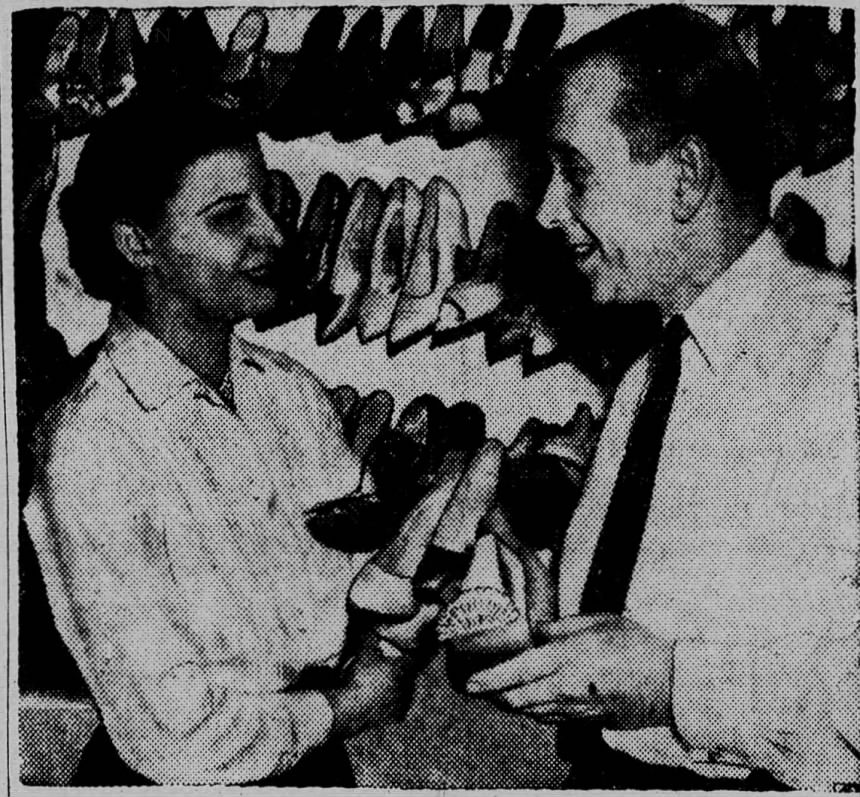
Herbert Levine with Beth Levine in 1954

Herbert Levine (April 19, 1916 – August 8, 1991) was an American fashion executive active from the 1940s through the 1970s. Together with his fashion designer wife, Beth Levine, he led the fashion accessory Herbert Levine label bearing his name until 1975.

== Life ==
Herbert Levine graduated from Dartmouth College in 1937 and worked as a journalist for Gannett newspapers and various fashion trade publications before taking a job as sales and advertising manager for Andrew Geller, a shoe company. He was never himself a designer, but attained success when he married Elizabeth "Beth" Katz, a shoe model turned designer. They met when he interviewed her for a design position.

He focused principally on running the business of the Herbert Levine label, while she served as head designer for the company. Mr. Levine and his wife, Beth, were hired in 1965, along with famed Couturier Emilio Pucci, and designer Alexander Girard to help overhaul a new look and style for Braniff International Airways. The Campaign, developed by Jack Tinker and Partner's Mary Wells Lawrence, was dubbed The End Of The Plain Plane, and was a revolutionary airline overhaul that had never been attempted. The Campaign was considered one of the most successful advertising and image reworks in history.

== Death ==
Herbert Levine died aged 75 in 1991 at his summer home in Westhampton Beach, Long Island; he was survived by his wife and a daughter, Anna Thomson, of Manhattan.
