= Uzbek clothing =

Traditional and modern clothing worn by Uzbeks

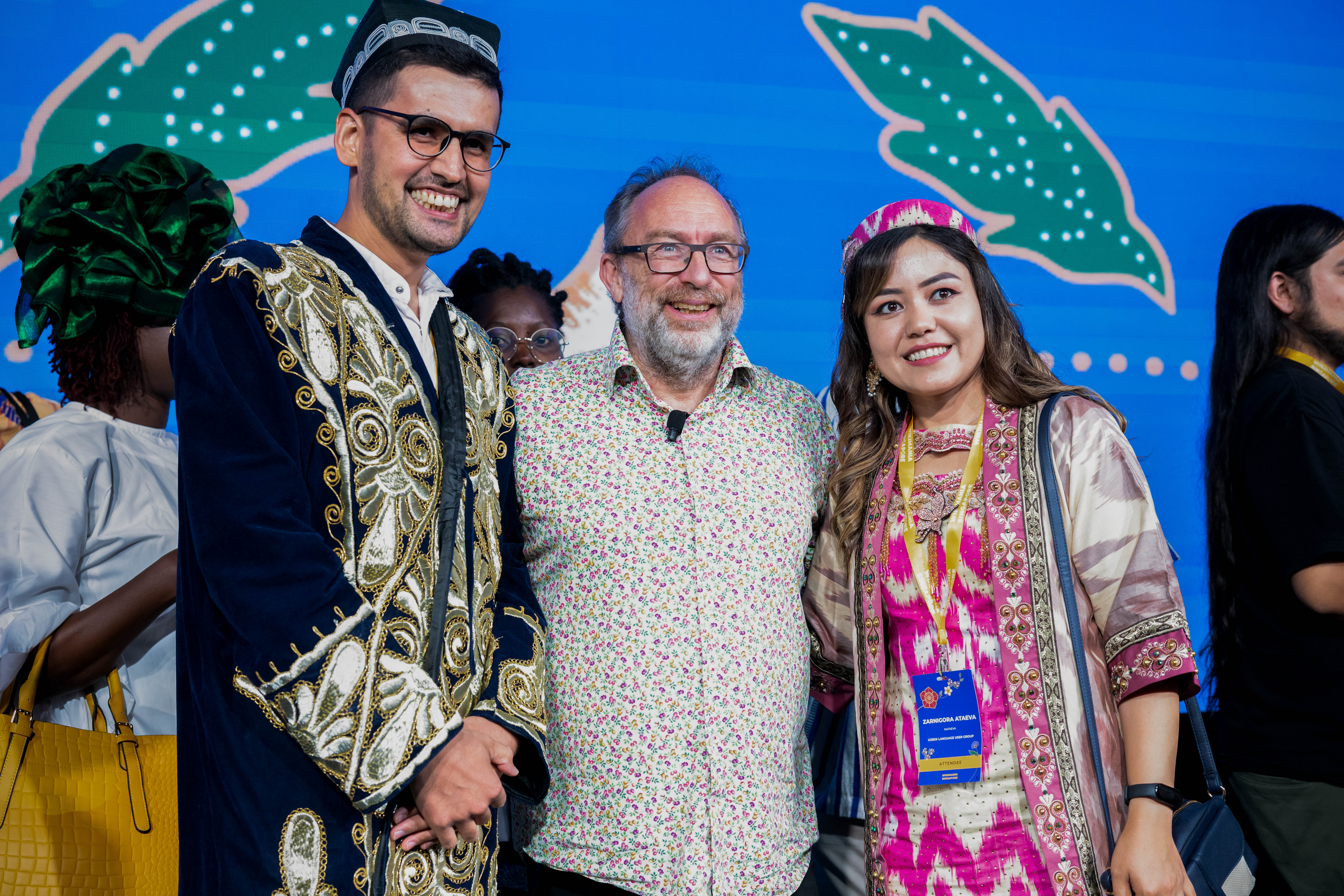
Wikipedia co-founder Jimmy Wales with an Uzbek man and woman in traditional clothes

Uzbek clothing consists of the traditional style of clothing worn by Uzbeks. It showcases the traditional fashion sensibilities of Uzbek cultural traditions and forms one of the major cultural facets of Uzbek civilization. There are two broad types of clothing worn by Uzbeks: traditional clothing known as traditional Uzbek clothing (Uzbek: oʻzbek milliy liboslari) and Western clothing, which encompasses all else not recognized as either national dress or the dress of another country.

Traditional clothing for men include various forms of headgear, most commonly a skullcap known as doʻppi, a long coat called chopon, a shirt known as yaktak, a traditional sash, and loose pants. Women usually wear clothing that covers the whole body, with bright-colored knee-length dresses with loose pants known as lozim being the most common attire. On special occasions, men wear richly embroidered chopons (called zarchopon in some regions), while women wear elaborate dresses made of satin and silk that are often richly embroidered with golden thread known as zardoʻzi.

Previous generations of Uzbeks nearly entirely wore traditional clothing. Following the Russian conquest of Central Asia, Western clothing and fashion became increasingly popular, especially among younger and more educated generations. While Uzbek clothing in the Soviet era typically focused primarily on utilitarian value and was largely uninfluenced by international fashion trends, in more recent times more emphasis has been put on traditional patterns. Still, it is now rare for someone to wear traditional clothing as everyday clothes, especially in cities, but doʻppis, chopons, and women's knee-length dresses remain popular, particularly in rural areas.

== Headgear ==
The doʻppi is a common style of Uzbek headgear. Uzbek doʻppis are typically square with pointed edges, but styles vary widely by region. While originally just worn by men, many women also wear doʻppis. Other common traditional headgear worn by Uzbek men include the chugurma, kalpak, karakul, and lately the Islamic taqiyah.

Although the Soviet government ran a widespread anti-veiling campaign starting in the 1920s, there was considerably less attention given to men's headwear. Some ethnic Uzbek Communist Party leaders and activists wore the traditional turban, while others wore only Western-style suits. Some Jadids supported adoption of such style suits as a symbol of progress, while others considered it a form of Russification.

== Men's clothing ==
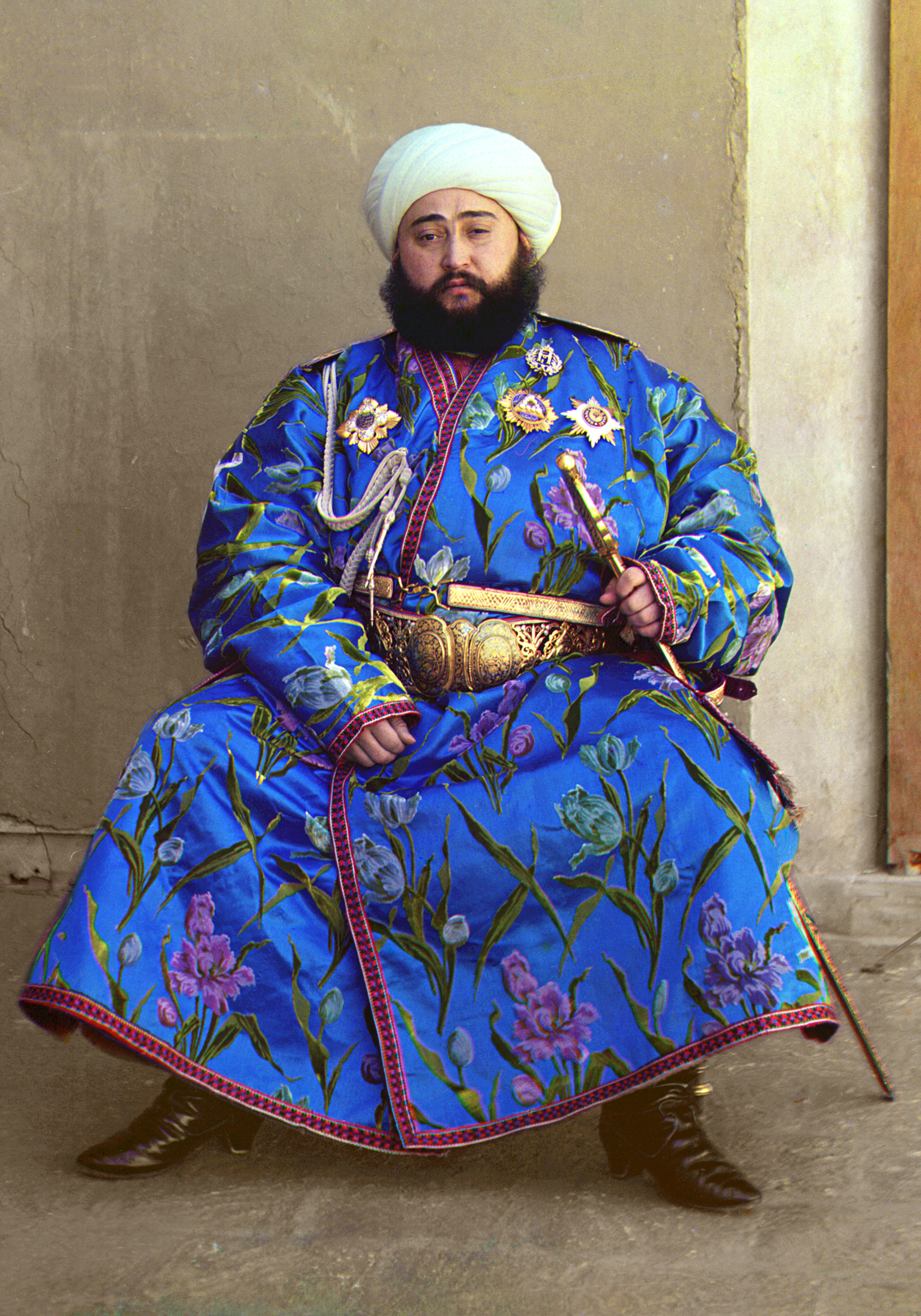
Muhammad Alim Khan, the last emir of Bukhara, wearing a turban and a chopon in 1911

Uzbek men's clothing has changed considerably over time. Historically, traditional outfits consisted of a striped chapan and turban. Historically, chopons (called khalat in Russian sources) were given as presents to indicate fealty or approval. It is still commons for Uzbeks to present elaborate chopons to honored guests.

Over time clothing styles have changed, as trousers with shirts became more popular. The doʻppi, most commonly a quilted black cap with white embroidery, has largely replaced the turban. Modern Uzbek men usually wear Western-style shirts and trousers.

== Women's clothing ==
Historically Uzbek women wore a paranja outside the home, which covered the entire body, complete with a mesh chachvon usually made of woven horsehair covering the face, although it stopped being worn in Uzbekistan in the late 1930s due to the hujum. While Uzbek women in Uzbekistan no longer wear the paranja, paranjas are sometimes draped during funerals. Uzbek women in Afghanistan still typically wear a burqa when leaving the home.

In modern times, Uzbek women often wear bright-colored knee-length dresses with loose pants known as ishton or lozim underneath. Some Uzbek women have started wearing the hijab and dresses with long sleeves, but the practice is not widespread.

== Materials and production methods ==
Uzbekistan is one of the world's largest producers of cotton and silk by volume, although cotton production has been declining over time. For centuries, the land of Uzbekistan was an integral part of the Silk Road with trading hubs in Bukhara and Samarkand. The city of Samarkand became a destination for silk producers throughout the area, resulting in the transmission of various patterns and styles of weaving.

== Gallery ==
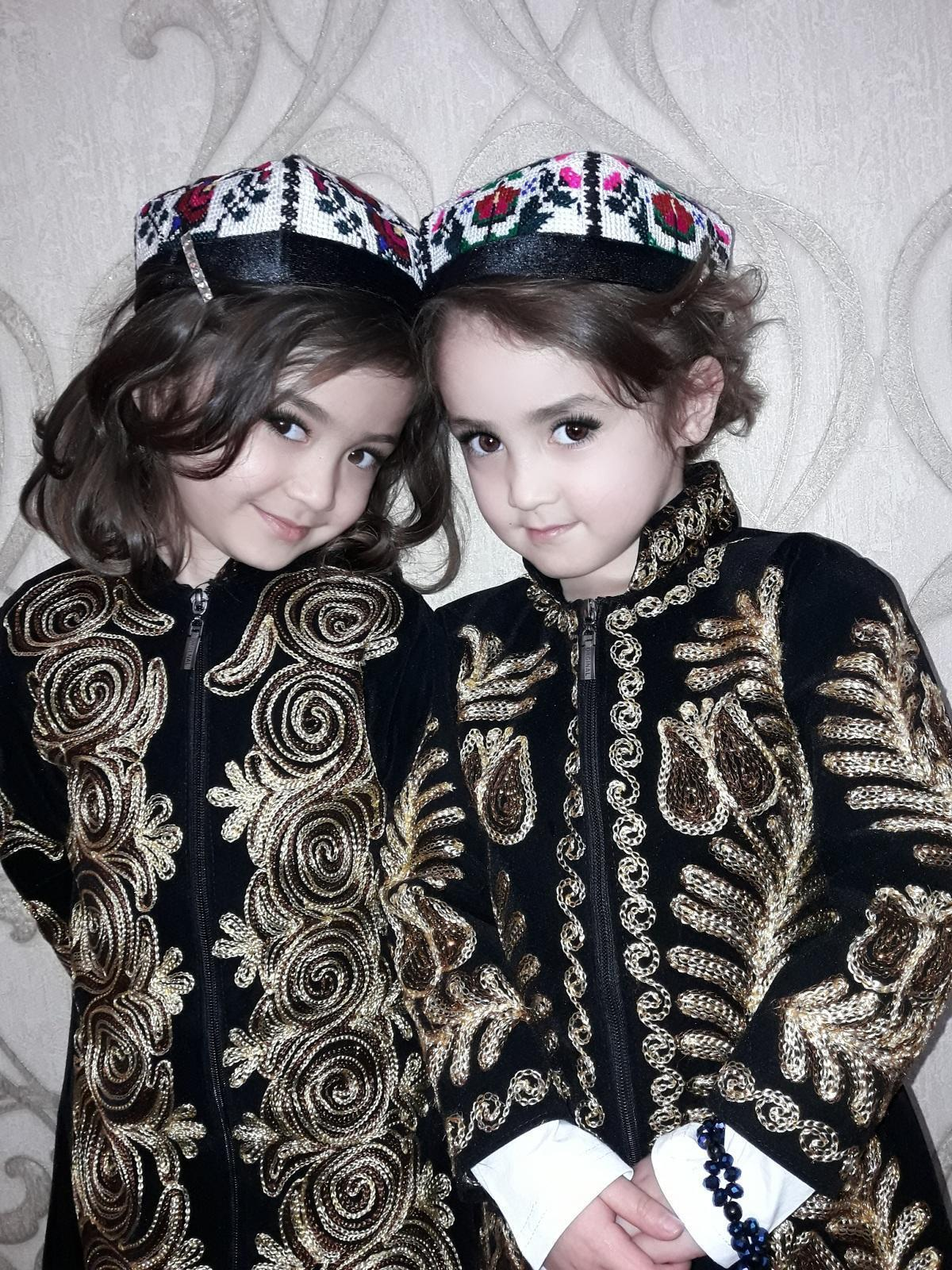
Uzbek children wearing an embroidered chopon known as a zarchopon

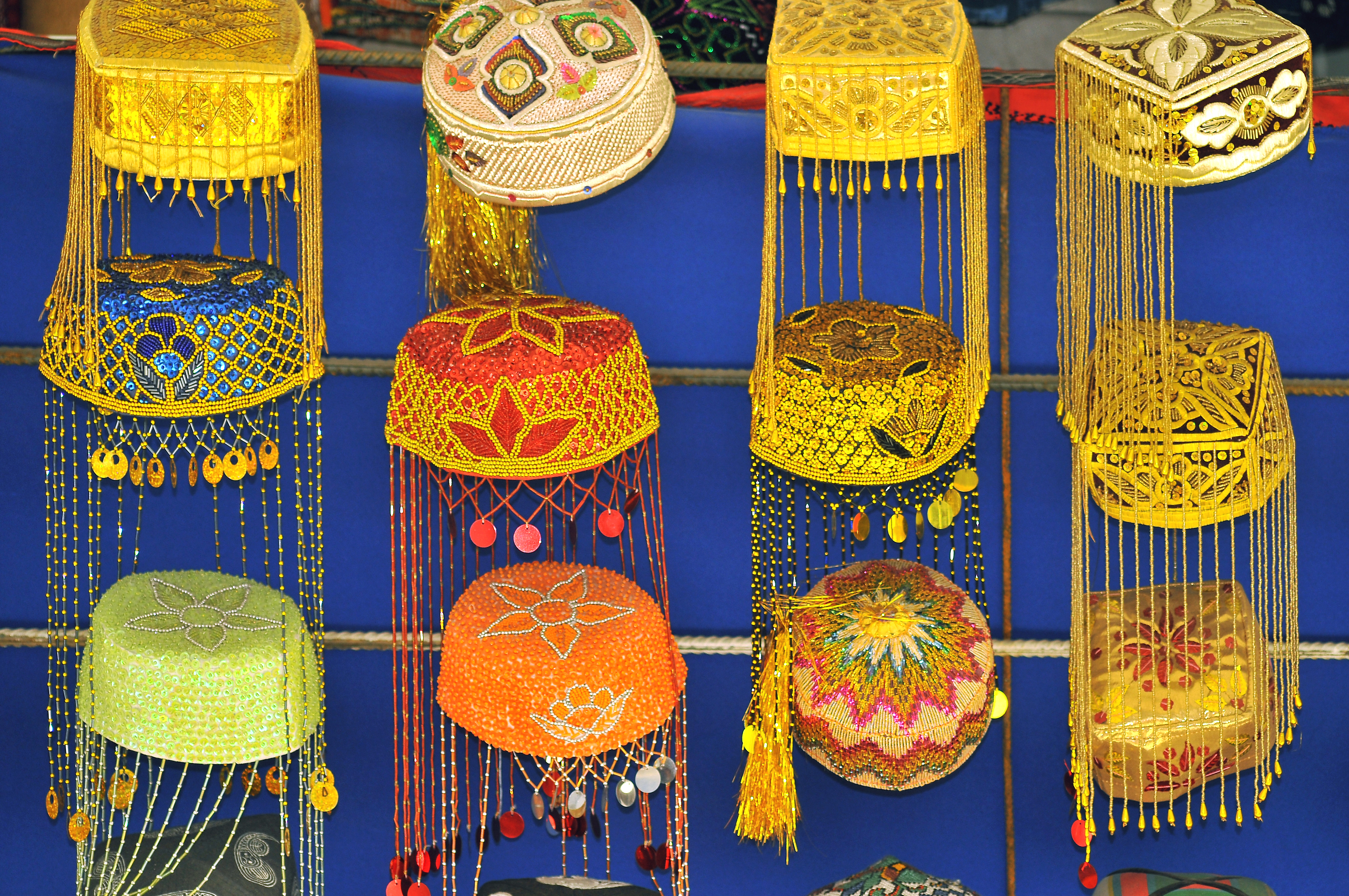
Embroidered doʻppis, mostly worn by brides

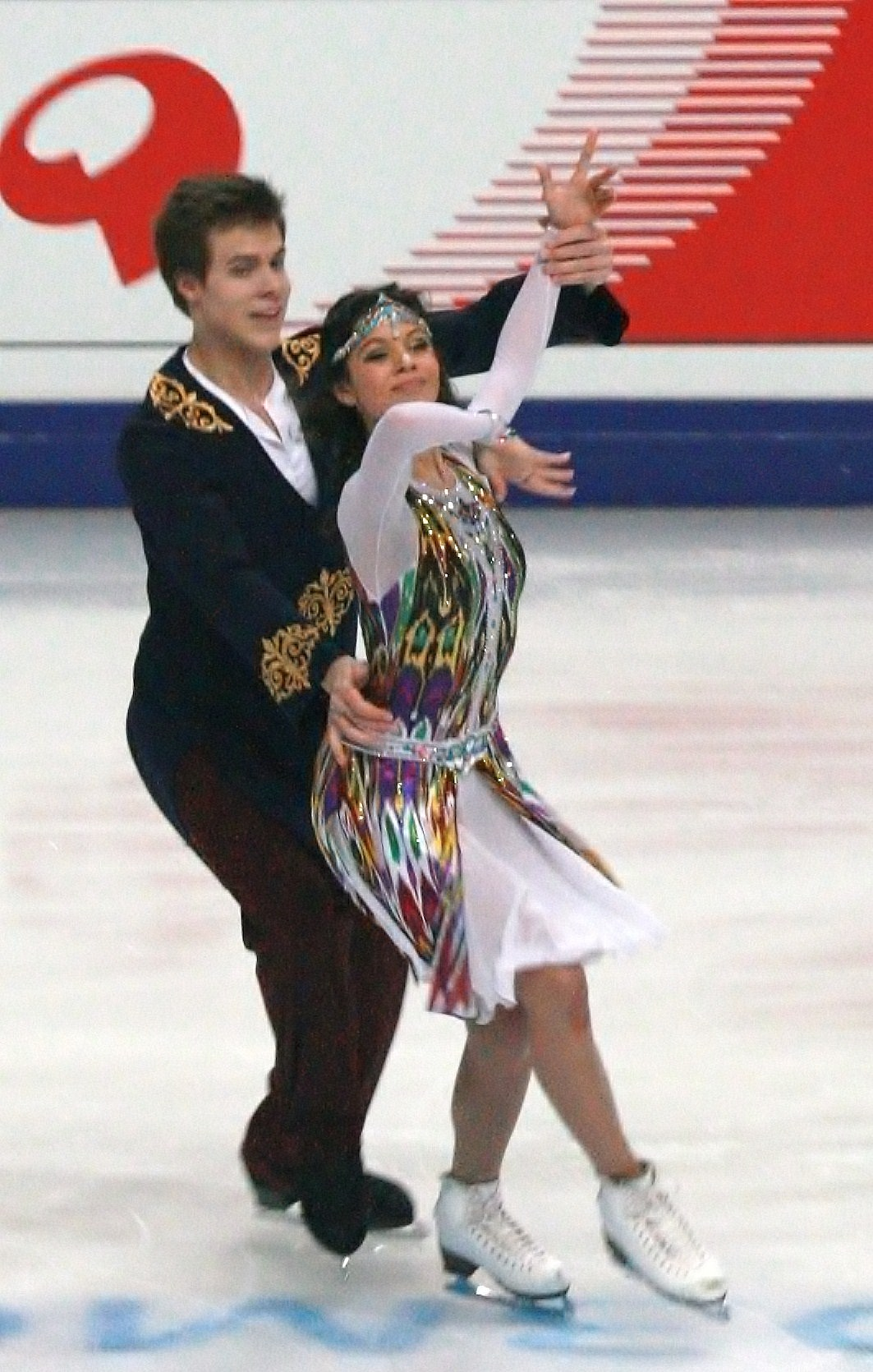
Figure skaters in costumes inspired by traditional Uzbek clothes

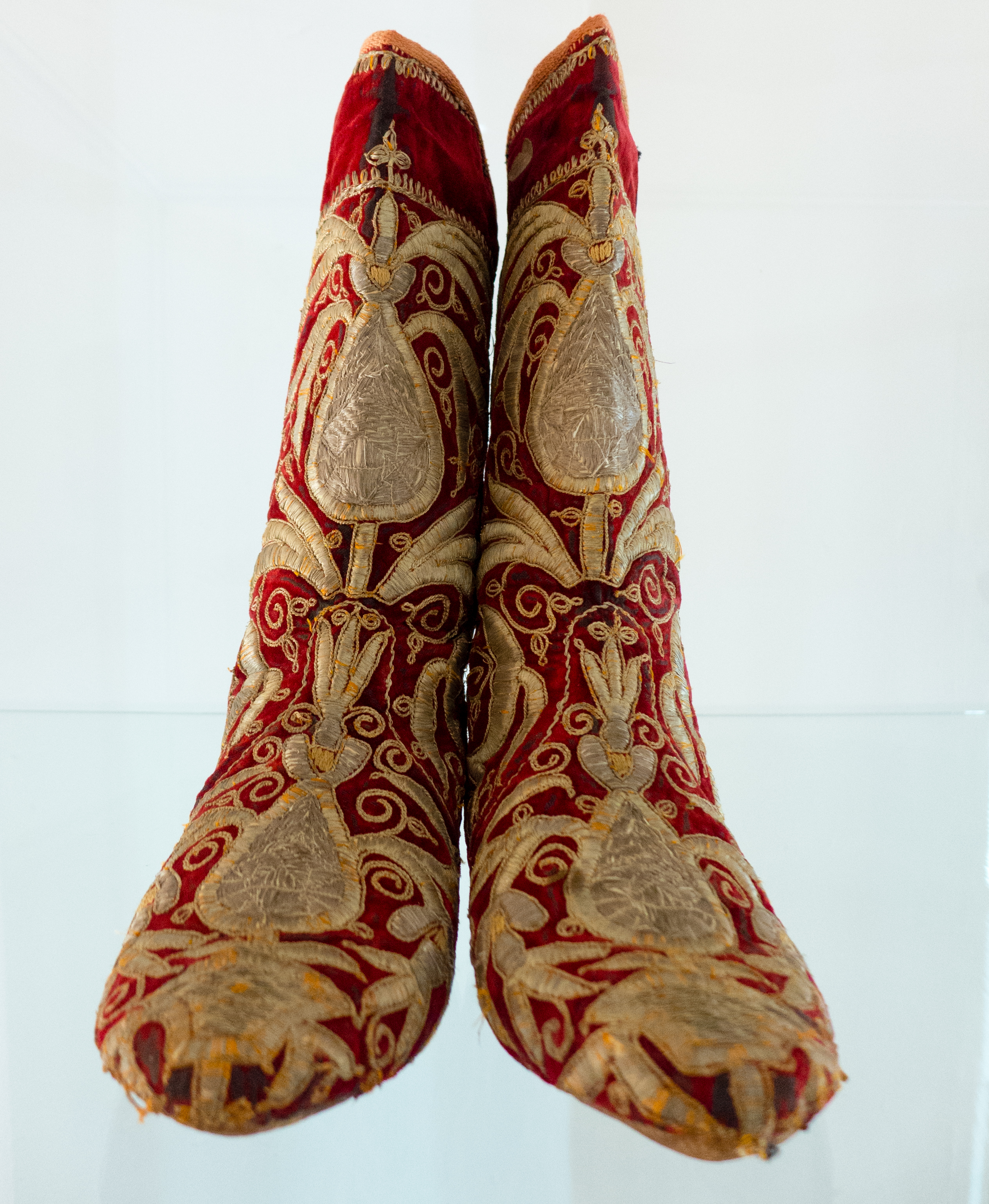
Embroidered boots worn by women on special occasions

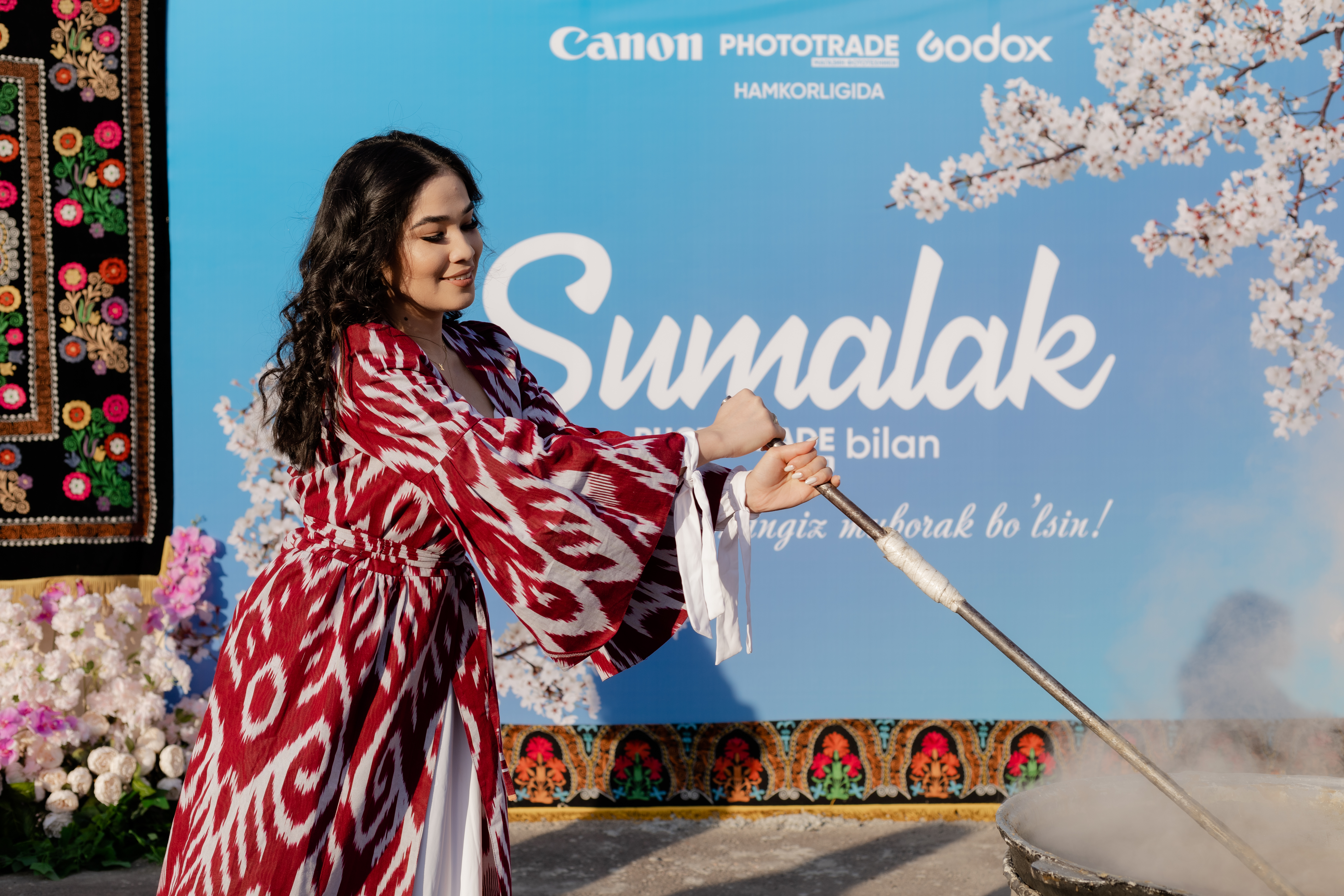
A woman in traditional clothes stirring sumalak during Navruz celebrations

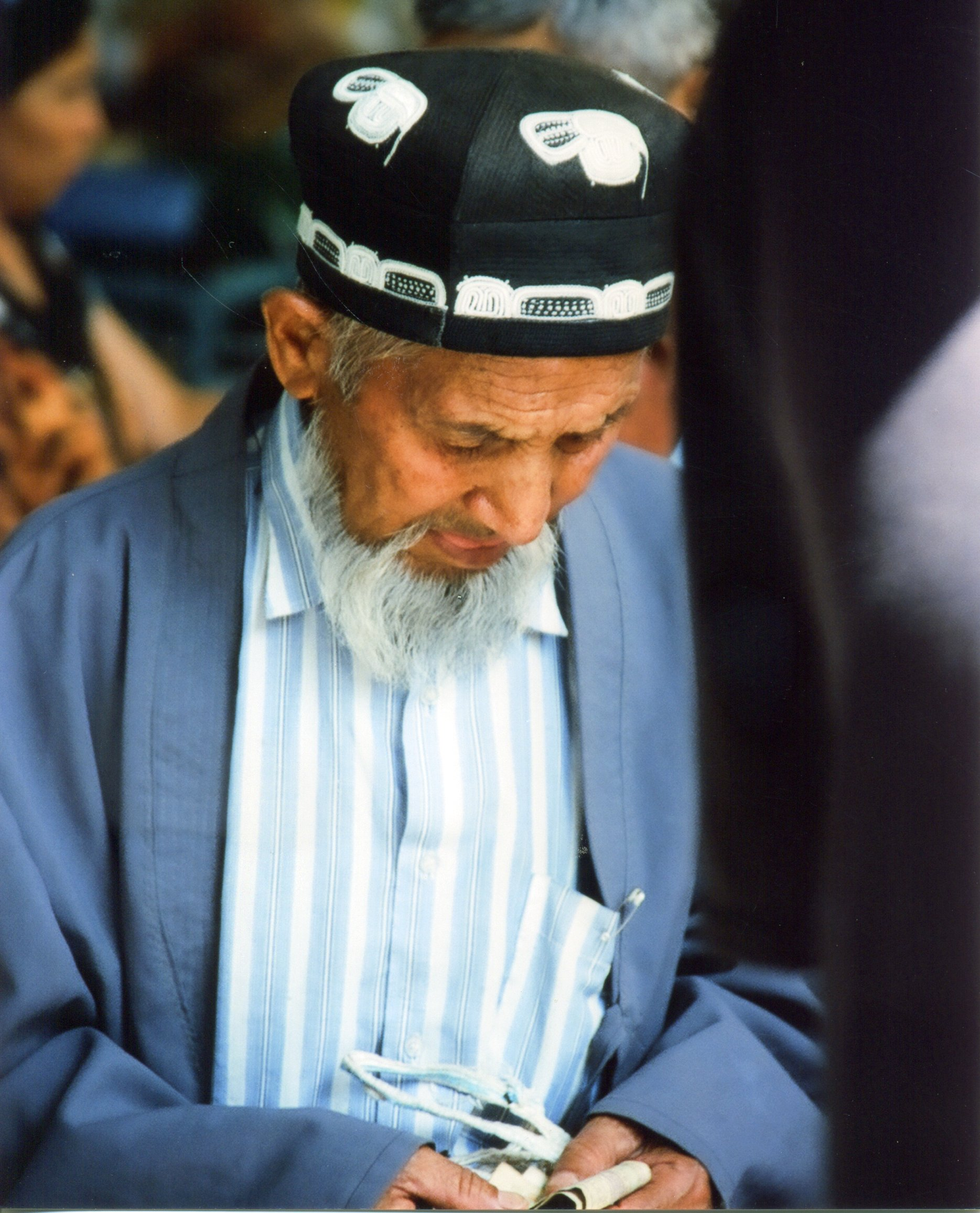
An Uzbek man wearing a doʻppi and a chopon

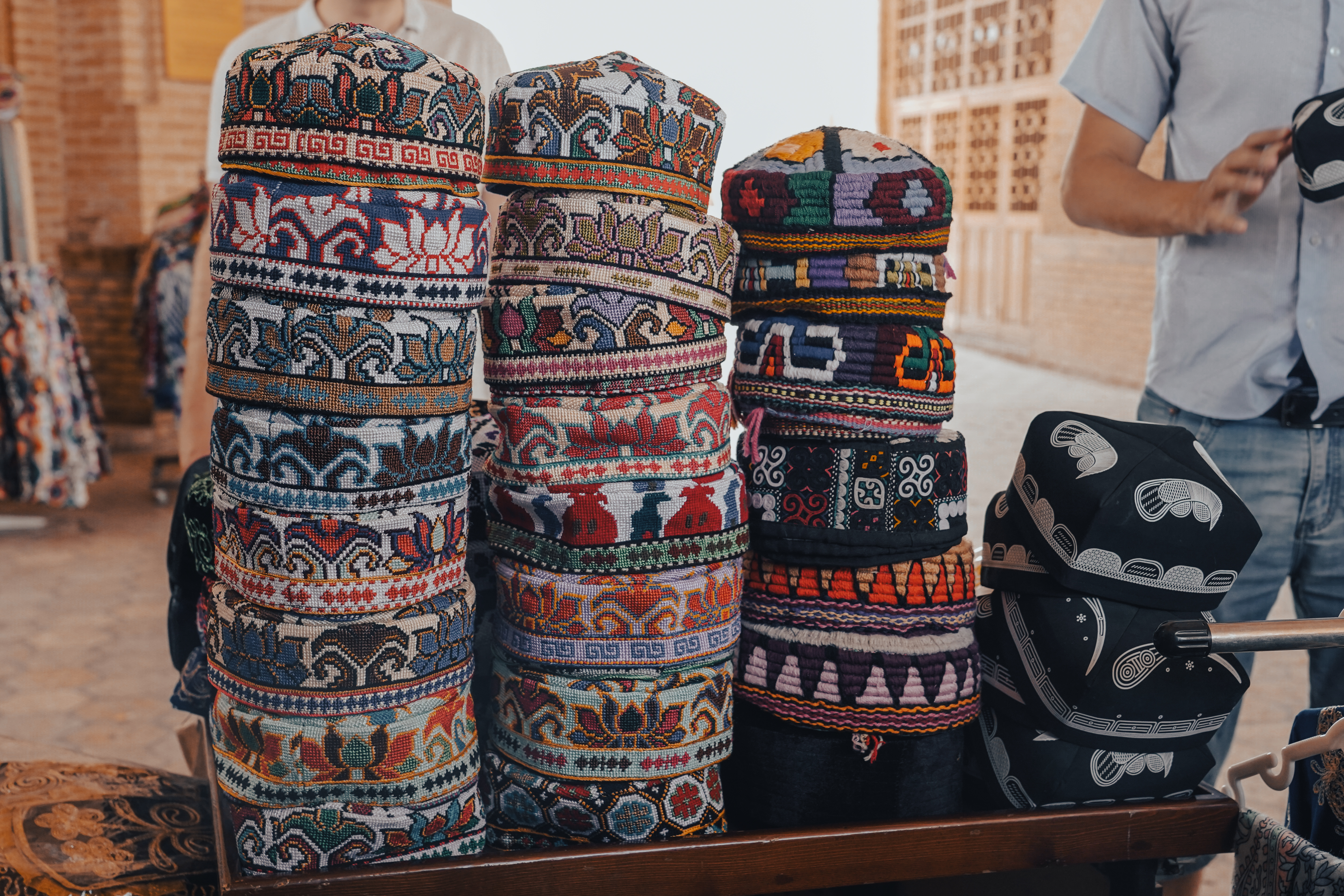
Various types of traditional Uzbek doʻppis known as Shahrisabz doʻppi (first and second rows), Surxon doʻppi (top three in the third row), and Chust doʻppi (last row)

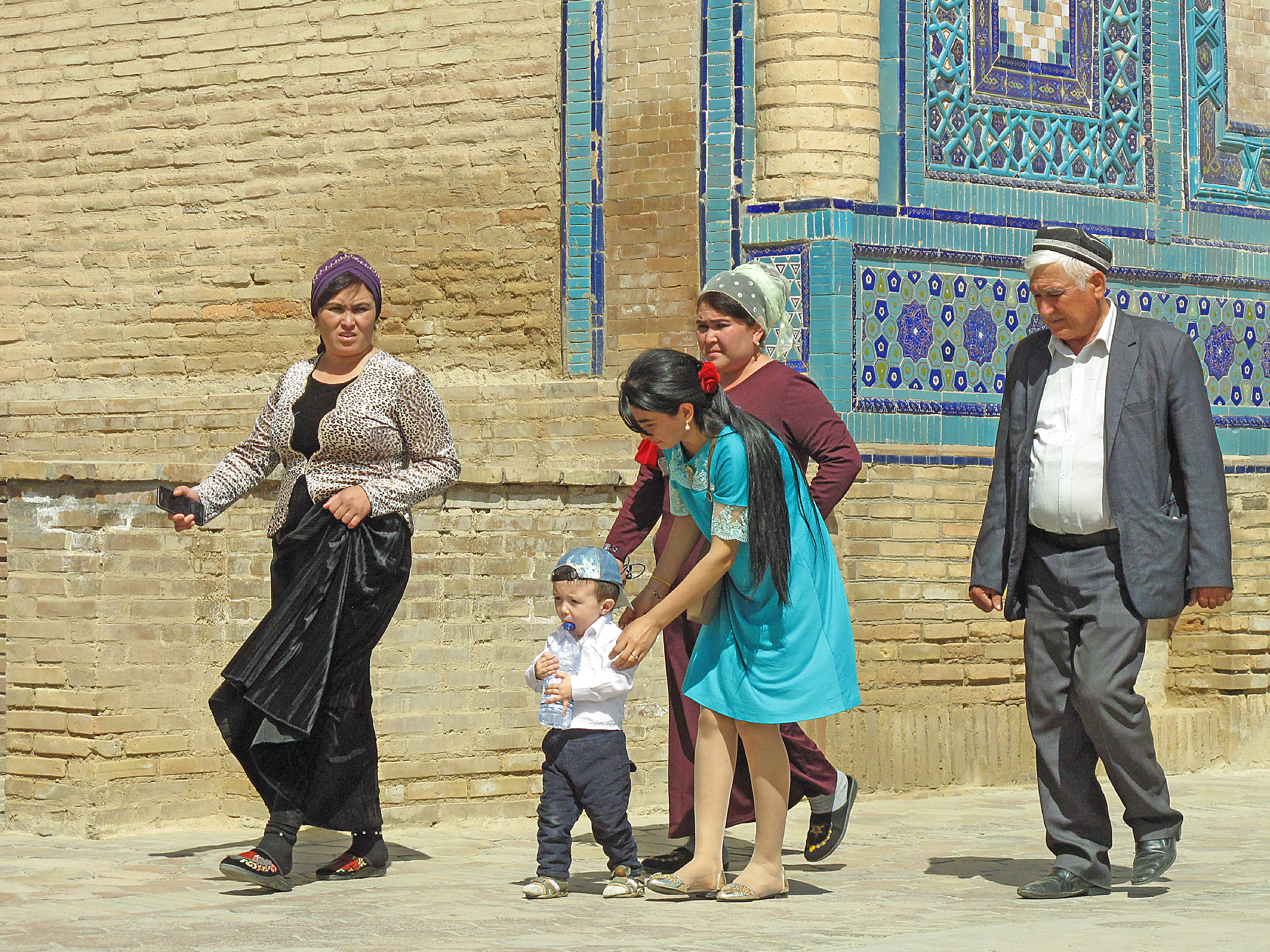
Uzbek women wearing contemporary traditional-style dresses and a man wearing a doʻppi

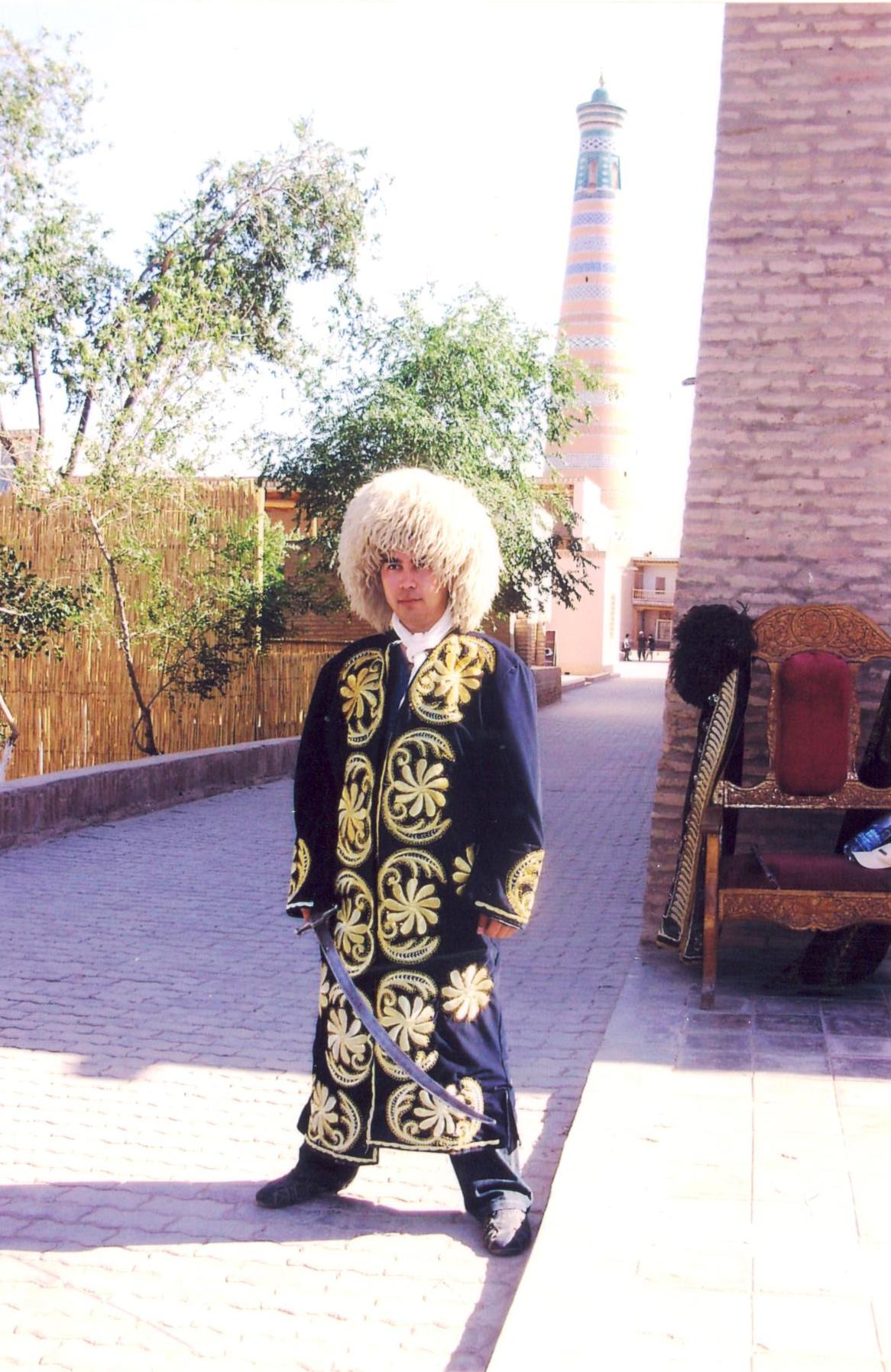
A man wearing a chugurma and a chopon

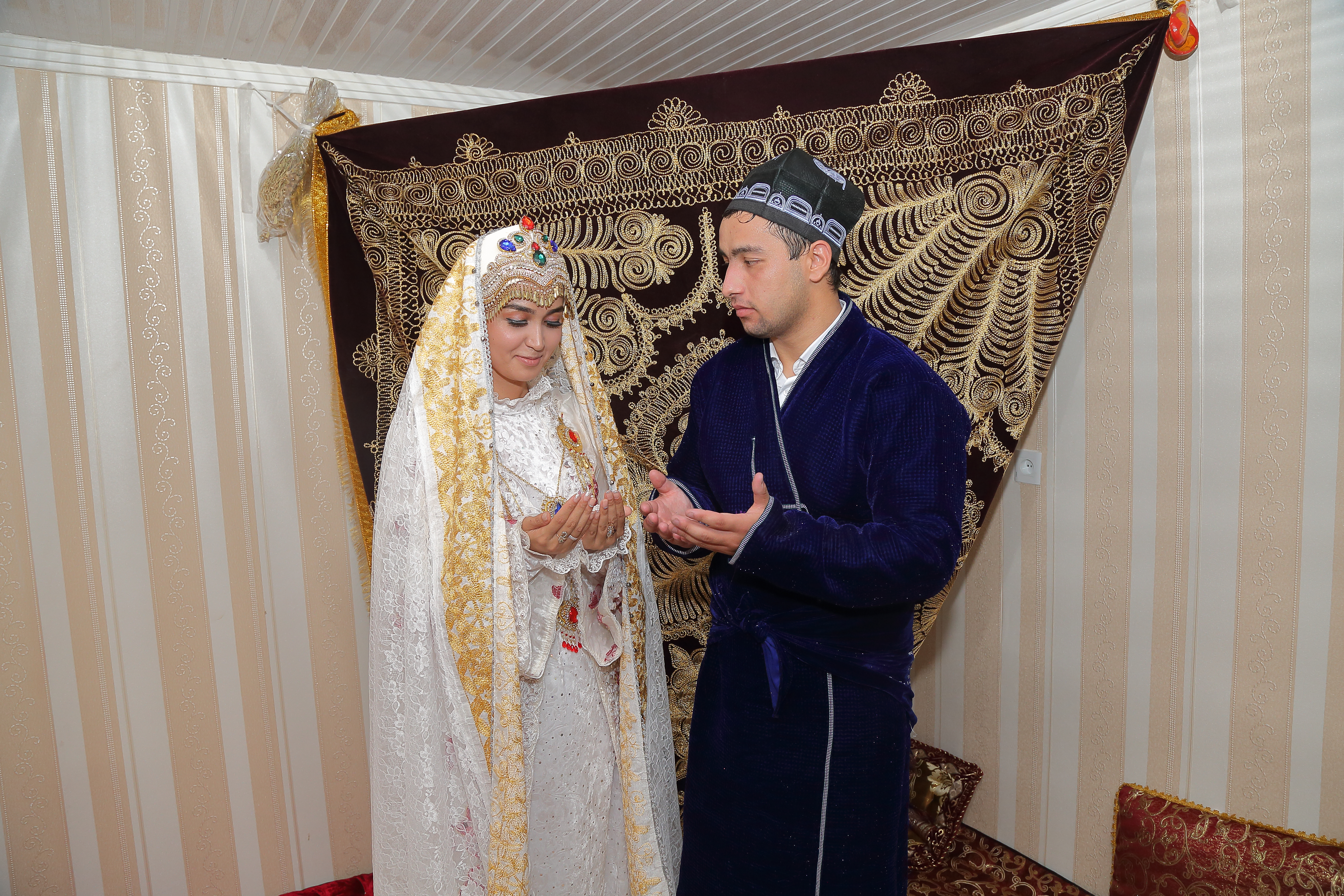
A bride and groom in traditional clothes

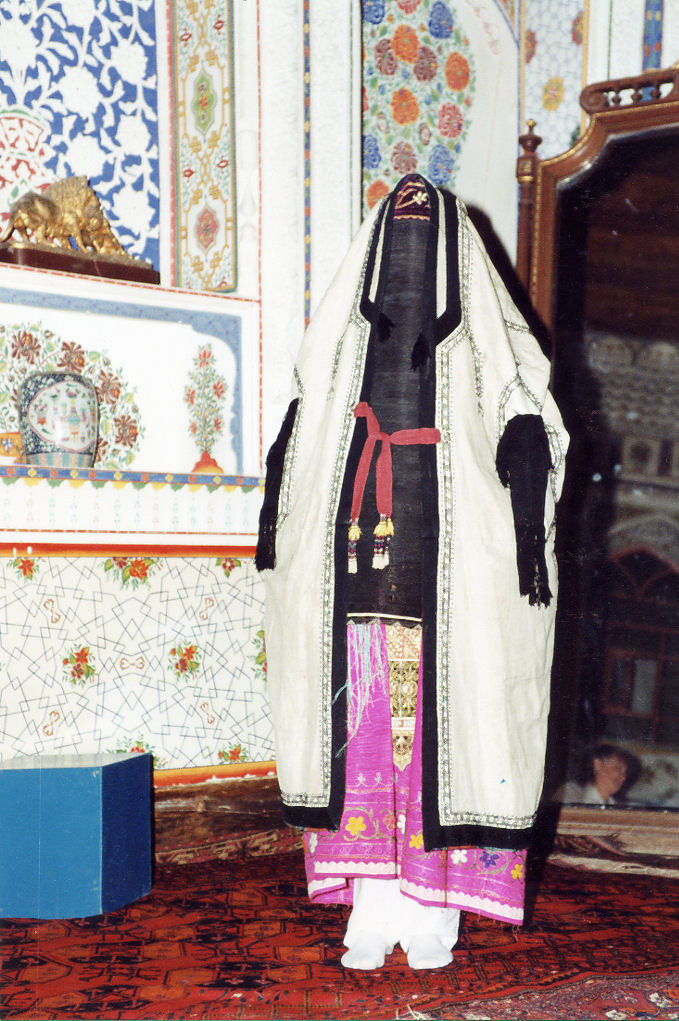
A paranja with a chachvon historically worn by women
