= Chapan =

Traditional Turkic and Central Asian coat

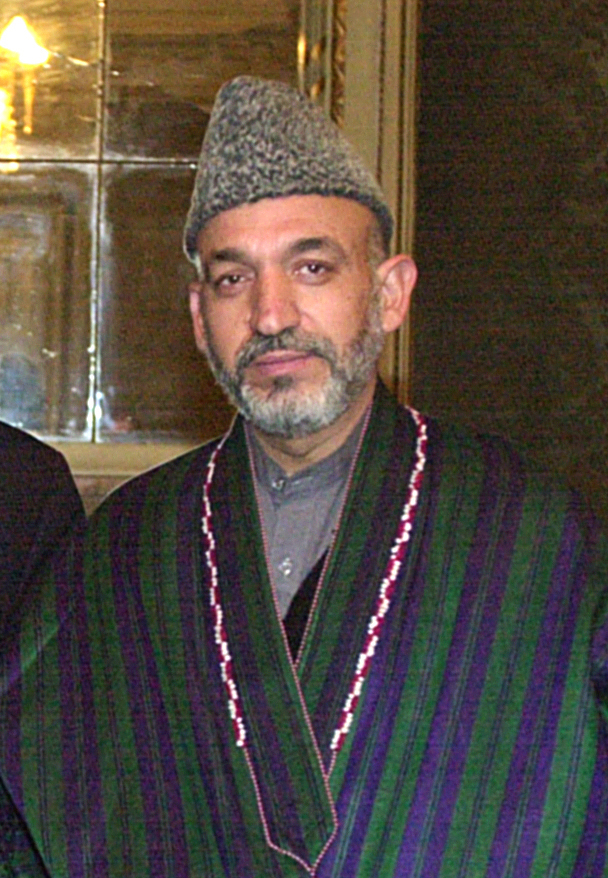
Former President Hamid Karzai, Afghanistan, wearing a chapan and karakul

Chapan or chopon (Persian: چپان; Pashto: چپنه; Kyrgyz: Чапан; Kazakh: Шапан, romanized: Şapan; Uzbek: Чопон, romanized: Chopon) is a coat worn over clothes, usually during the cold winter months. Usually worn by men, these coats are adorned with intricate threading and come in a variety of colors and patterns. It is worn in Central Asia, including Uzbekistan, Afghanistan, Tajikistan, Kazakhstan and Kyrgyzstan. A chapan cape was often worn by former Afghan president Hamid Karzai.

The etymology of the term is believed to derive either from the Persian chapān, which means 'old', 'threadbare' and 'run-down costume'; or the Chagatai chāpān, itself derived from the Persian jobbe, from the Arabic jubba meaning 'wrapper', 'cloak', 'coat' or 'outer garment'.

== See also ==
- Afghan clothing
- Kaftan
- Żupan
- Adras (fabric)
- Chugurma
