= Coonskin =

Coonskin may refer to:

- The skin of a raccoon
- Coonskin cap, a type of hat
- Coonskin (film), a 1975 animated film by Ralph Bakshi
