= Colback (hat) =

Military headgear

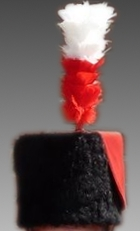
collback of a Belgian sapper.

The colback, or busby, is a fur headpiece of Turkish origin. It was worn by officers and elite companies of hussars and chasseurs in the French army during the French Directory and the First French Empire, under Napoleon I. It often had a plume in front. The name "colback" is borrowed from Turkish kalpak.

== See also ==
- Busby (military headdress)
- List of hat styles
- List of headgear
- List of fur headgear
