= Boyar hat =

Type of hat formerly worn by Russian nobility

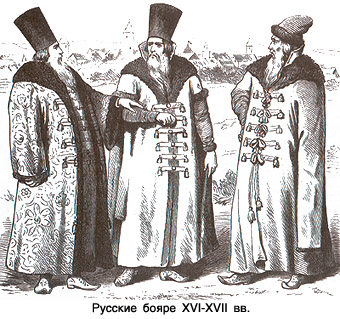
Boyars in the 16th-17th centuries

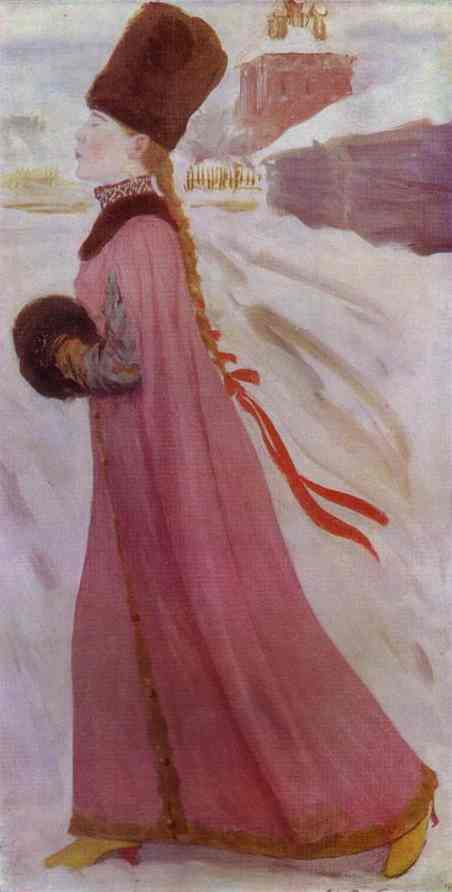
Moscow Girl in the 17th century by Andrei Ryabushkin, 1903. Shows a girl wearing gorlatnaya hat and a muff.

The boyar hat (Russian: боярская шапка, more correct Russian name is горлатная шапка, gorlatnaya hat) was a fur hat worn by Russian nobility between the 15th and 17th centuries, most notably by boyars, for whom it was a sign of their social status. The higher hat indicated the higher status.

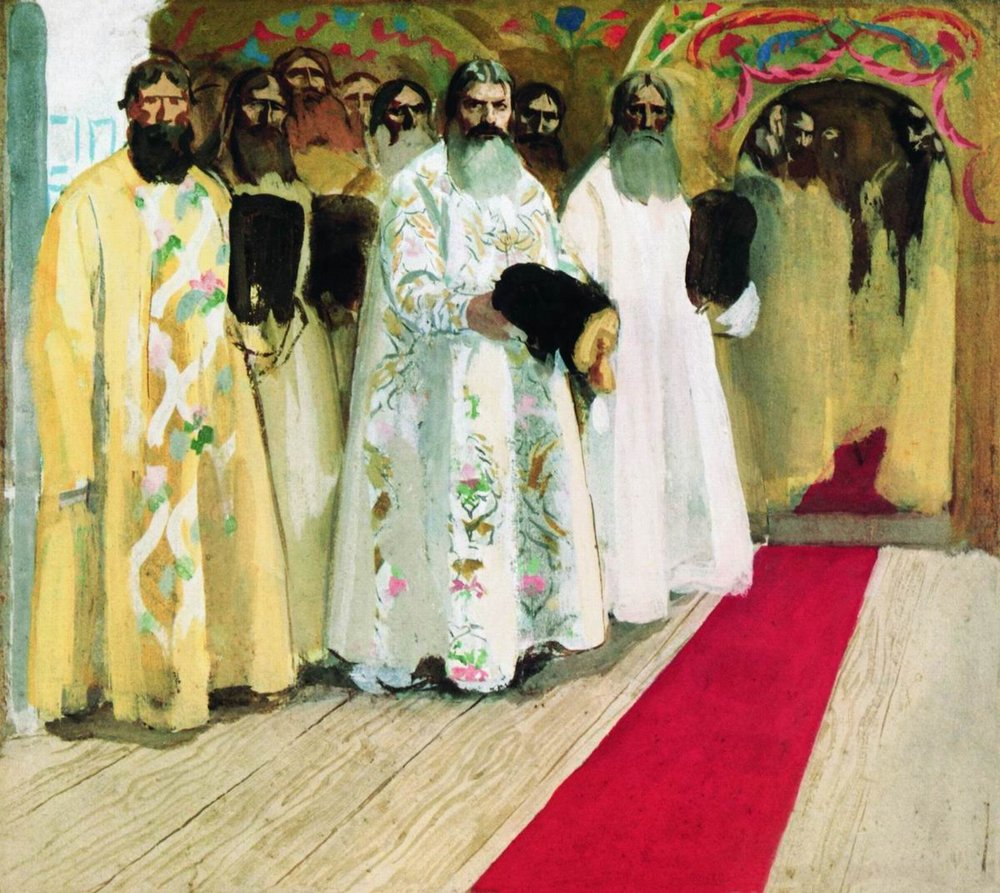
Tsar's entry awaited by Andrei Ryabushkin. A 1901 sketch, State Tretyakov Gallery, Moscow. Shows boyars in Kremlin, waiting for the Russian Tsar.

In average, it was one ell in height, having the form of a cylinder with more broad upper part, velvet or brocade top and the main body made of fox, marten or sable fur.

When taken off, the hat was often held above the forearm, between hand and elbow, or worn as a muff. When at home, the hats were preserved on wooden stands that were adorned with painted designs.

Today the hats of this type are sometimes used in Russian fashion.

== See also ==
- List of hat styles
- List of fur headgear

== Sources ==
- Киреева Е. В. «История костюма. Европейский костюм от античности до XX века.» Москва. Просвещение. 1976 / Kireeva E. V. The history of costume. European costume from Antiquity into the 20th century. Moscow, Prosvescheniye, 1976.
