= Navruz in Uzbekistan =

Celebrations of the Persian New Year

Navroʻz
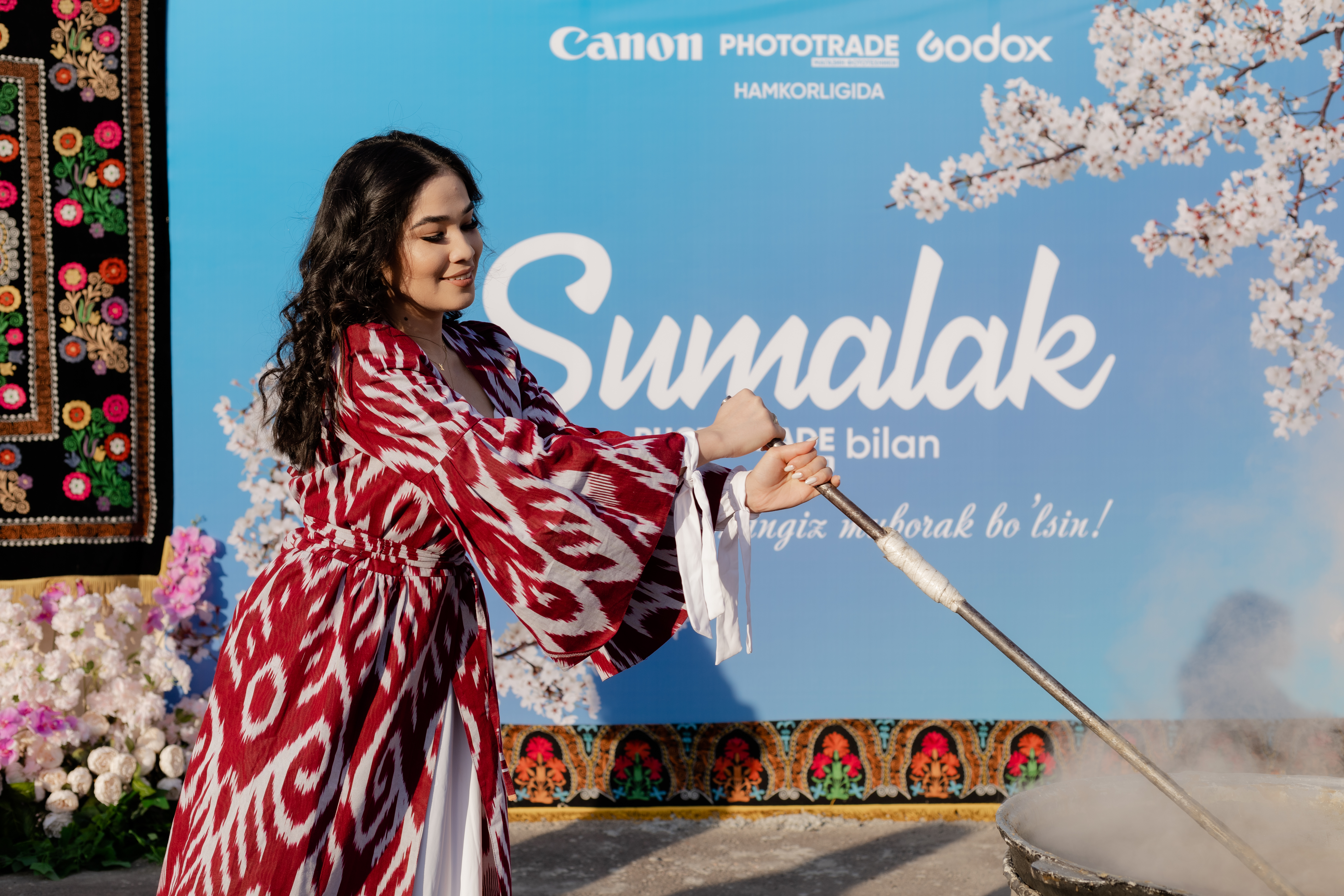
- An Uzbek woman in traditional clothes stirring sumalak
- Date: 21 March
- Next time: 21 March 2026
- Frequency: Annual
- Related to: Nowruz

Nawrouz, Novruz, Nowrouz, Nowrouz, Nawrouz, Nauryz, Nooruz, Nowruz, Navruz, Nevruz, Nowruz, Navruz
- UNESCO Intangible Cultural Heritage
- Country: Afghanistan, Azerbaijan, Iran, India, Iraq, Kazakhstan, Kyrgyzstan, Pakistan, Tajikistan, Turkey, Turkmenistan, and Uzbekistan
- Reference: 01161
- Region: Asia and the Pacific

Inscription history
- Inscription: 2016 (4th session)
- List: Representative

Navruz (Uzbek: Navroʻz / Наврўз) is celebrated widely in Uzbekistan. It is the day of the vernal equinox, and marks the beginning of spring in the Northern Hemisphere. It has been celebrated on the territory corresponding to modern-day Uzbekistan for at least two thousand years.

When Uzbekistan was part of the Soviet Union, celebrations of Navruz were generally unofficial, and at times even prohibited. Currently Navruz is an official public holiday in Uzbekistan and is always celebrated on March 21. Still, holiday celebrations are spread out over several days.

== History ==
Navruz widely celebrated on a vast territory of Central Asia and ritual practice acquired its special features. The festival was legitimized by prayers at mosques, and visits to the mazars of Muslim saints and to sacred streams. In the Emirate of Bukhara, a broad official celebration of Navruz was started by Muzaffar bin Nasrullah, who sought to strengthen the image of the Manghud dynasty during the crisis of political legitimacy.

== Navruz customs ==
In preparation for the holiday, people tidy their homes and mahallas (neighborhoods), and buy new clothes. Before, during, and after Navruz, it is customary to prepare sumalak, the main ceremonial dish of the holiday. Sumalak is a sweet paste made entirely from germinated wheat and is cooked in a large kazan. To prepare sumalak friends, relatives, and neighbors – usually women – gather around the kazan, all taking a turn to stir the mixture. When ready, sumalak is distributed among neighbors, relatives, and friends. At Navruz, people also visit relatives and friends and give presents to children.

Navruz is often cited as the most popular holiday in Uzbekistan. On March 21, elaborate holiday concerts are organized across the country, notably in the capital city of Tashkent. Book fairs, concerts, games, and special television and radio programs last for the whole month of March. It has been noted that after Uzbekistan gained independence in 1991, government officials have promoted Navruz as a main national holiday and have tightly controlled the content and form of the festivities.

== Gallery ==
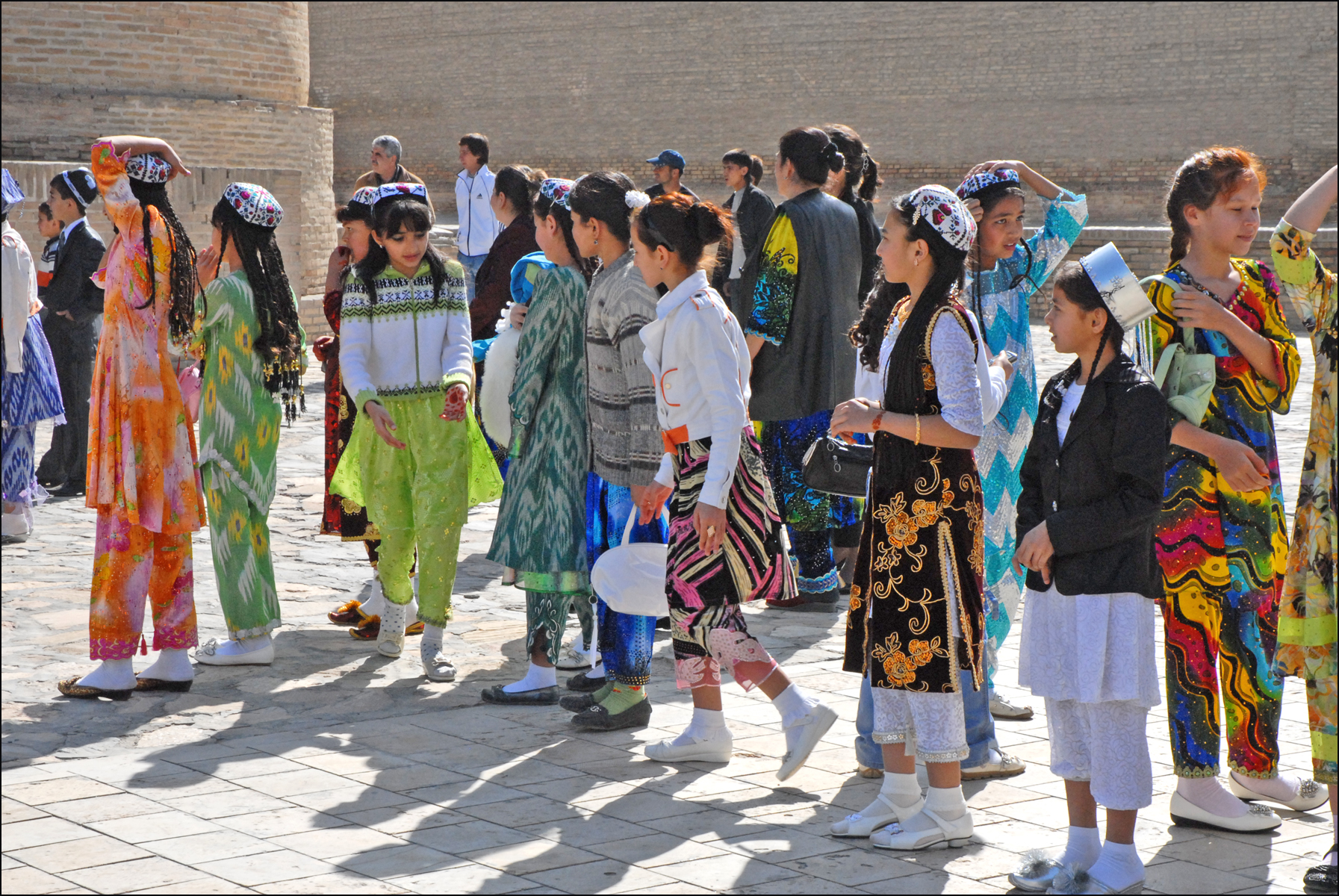
Navruz celebrations in Bukhara

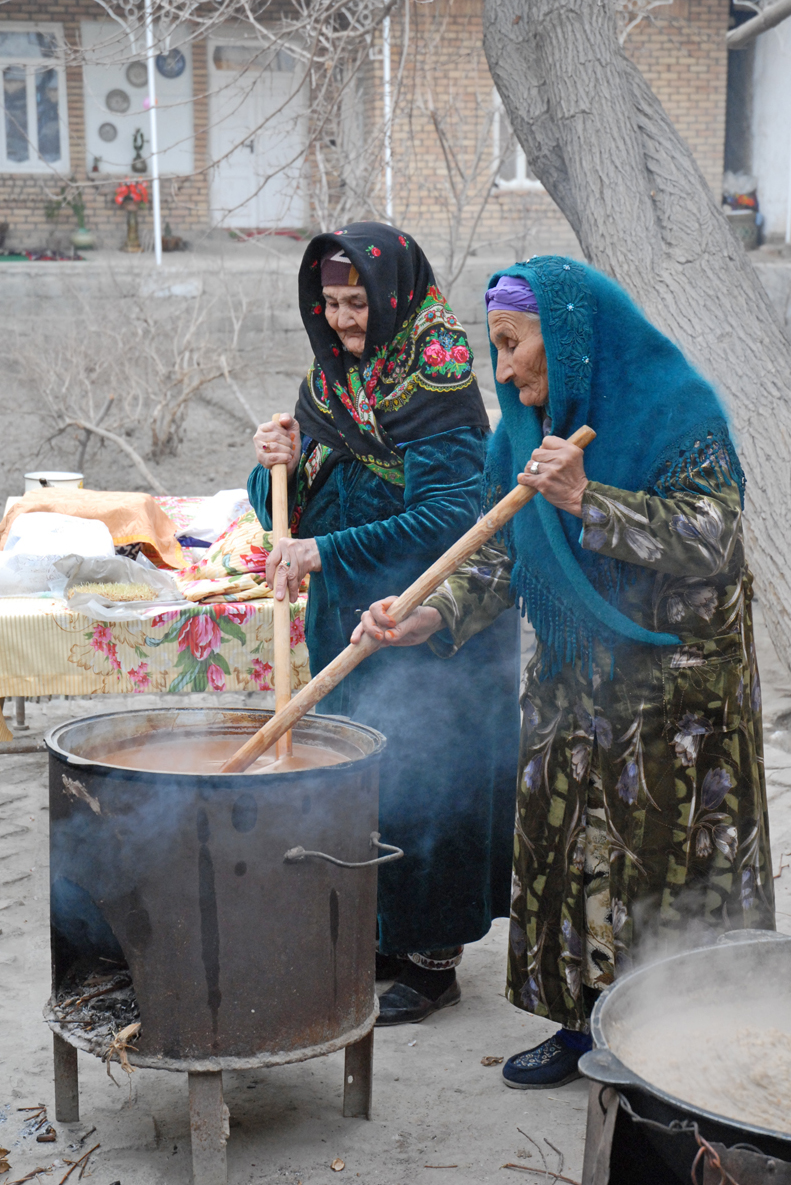
Cooking sumalak for Navruz

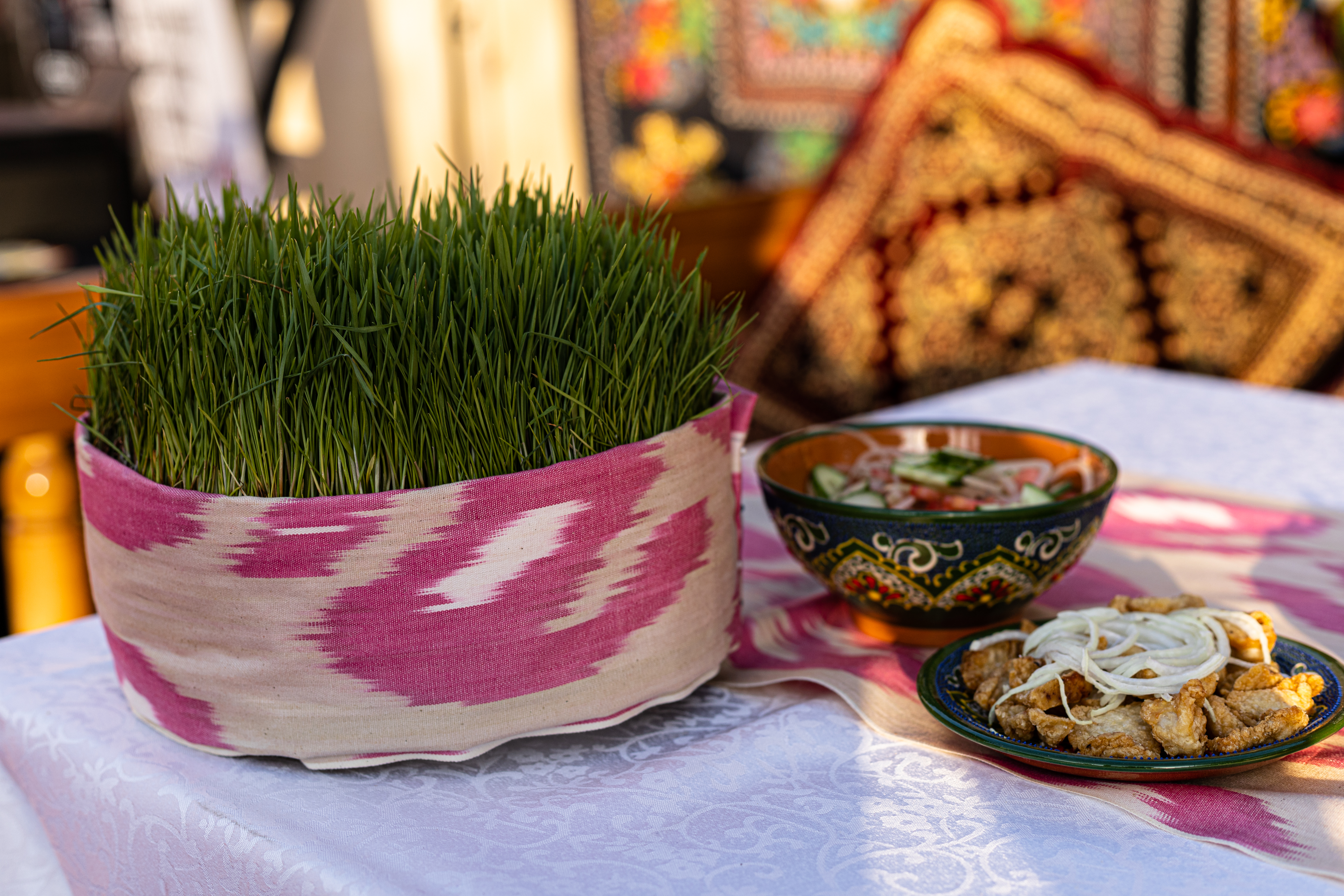
Germinated wheat

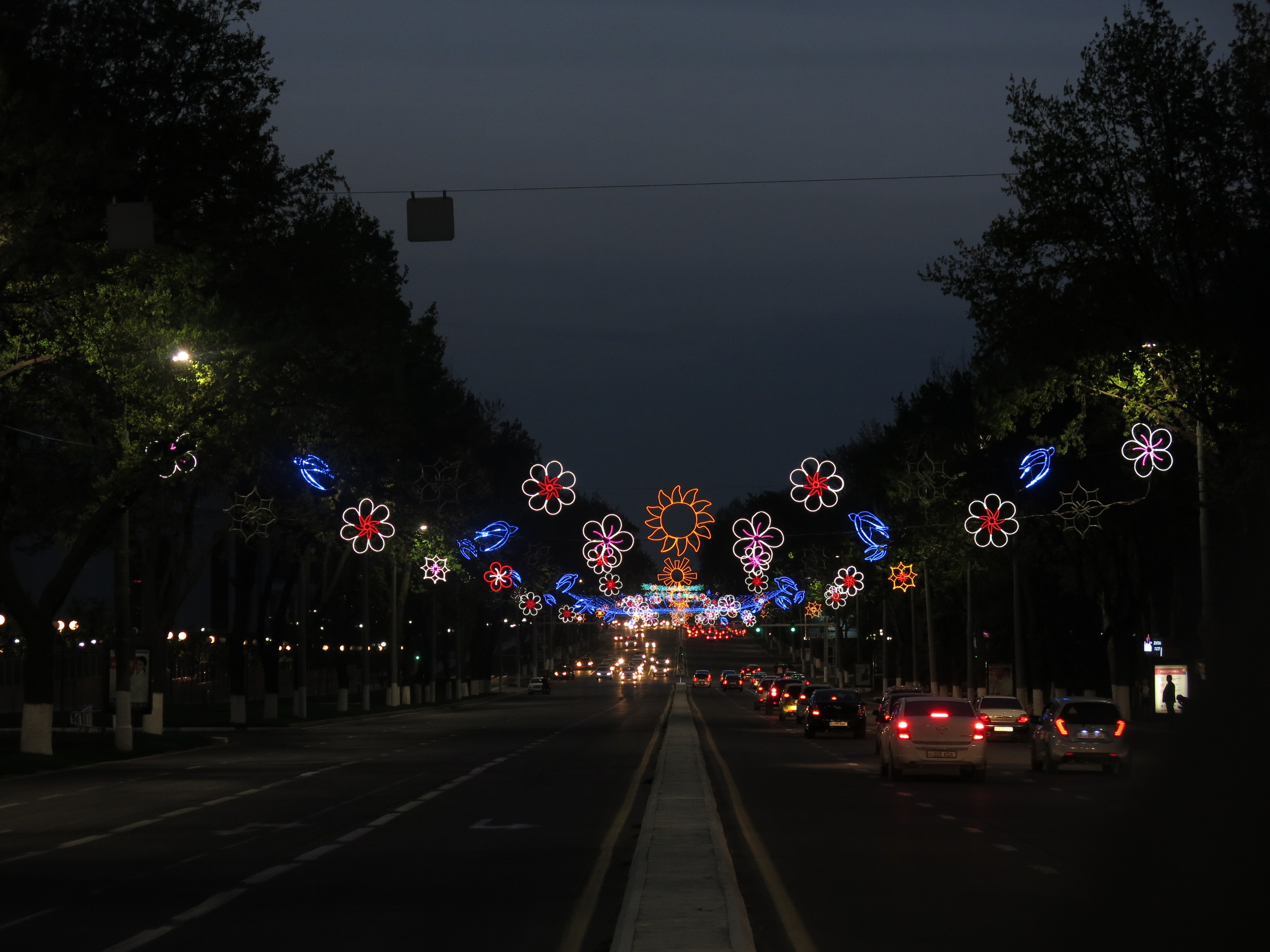
A street in Tashkent decorated with lights celebrating Navruz

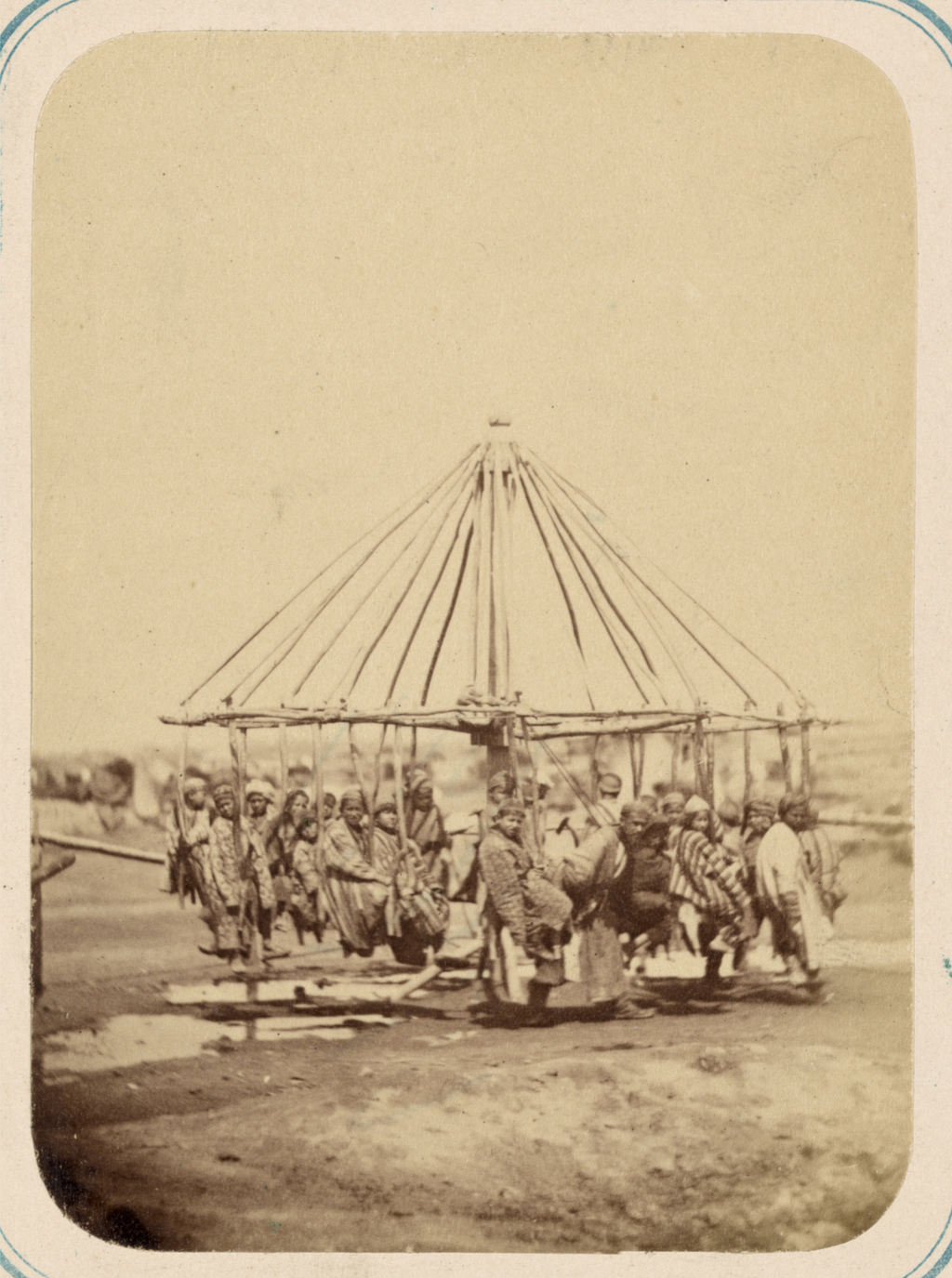
Children celebrating Navruz in Samarkand in 19th-century Russian Turkestan

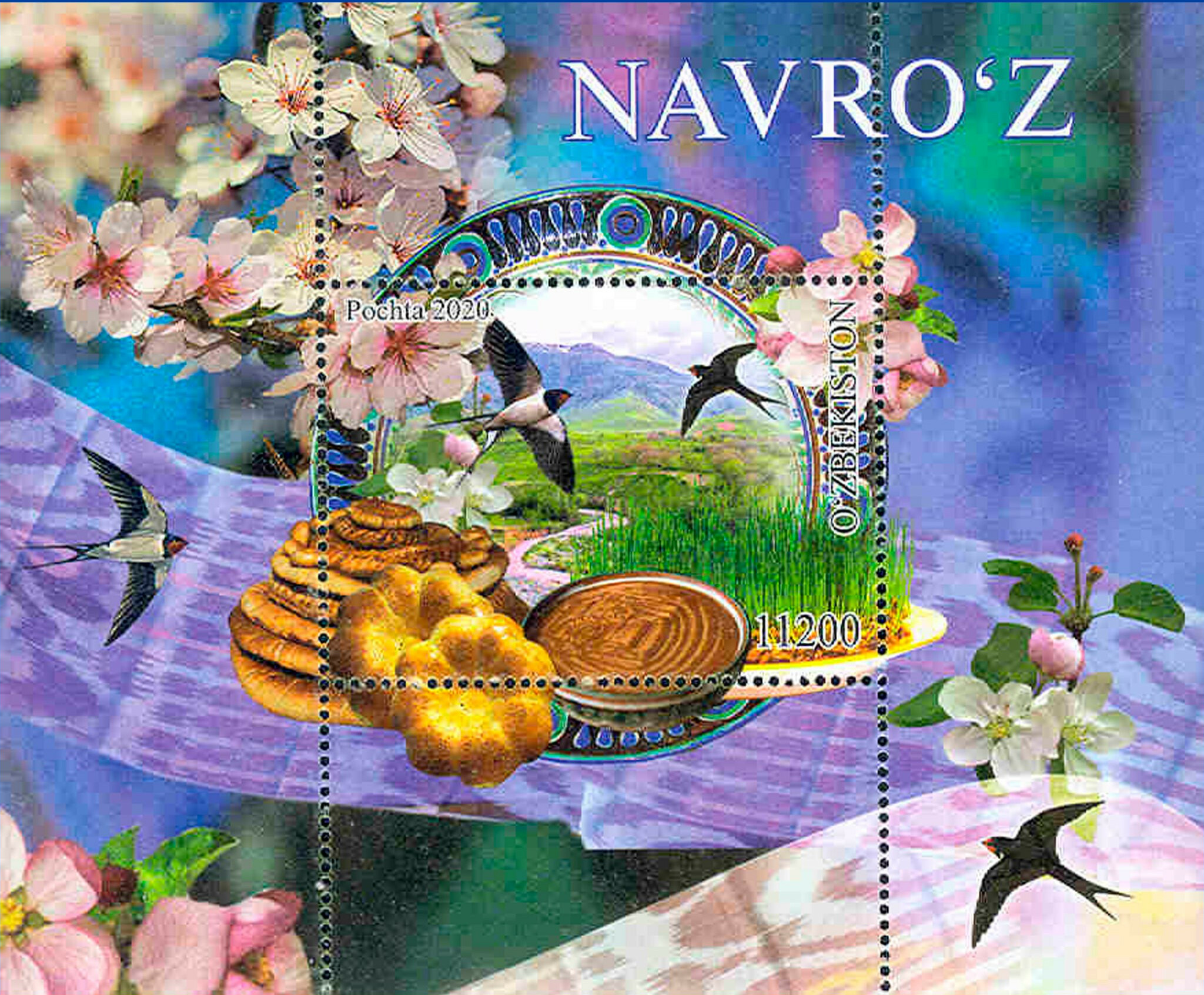
Navruz on an Uzbek stamp
