= List of fur headgear =

Below is a list of fur headgear (fur hats, fur caps, etc.). Some other kinds of hats can be lined or trimmed with fur, such as historical Scandinavian karpus or kabuss/kabuds hats, or Spanish montera/montero caps. They are not listed here.

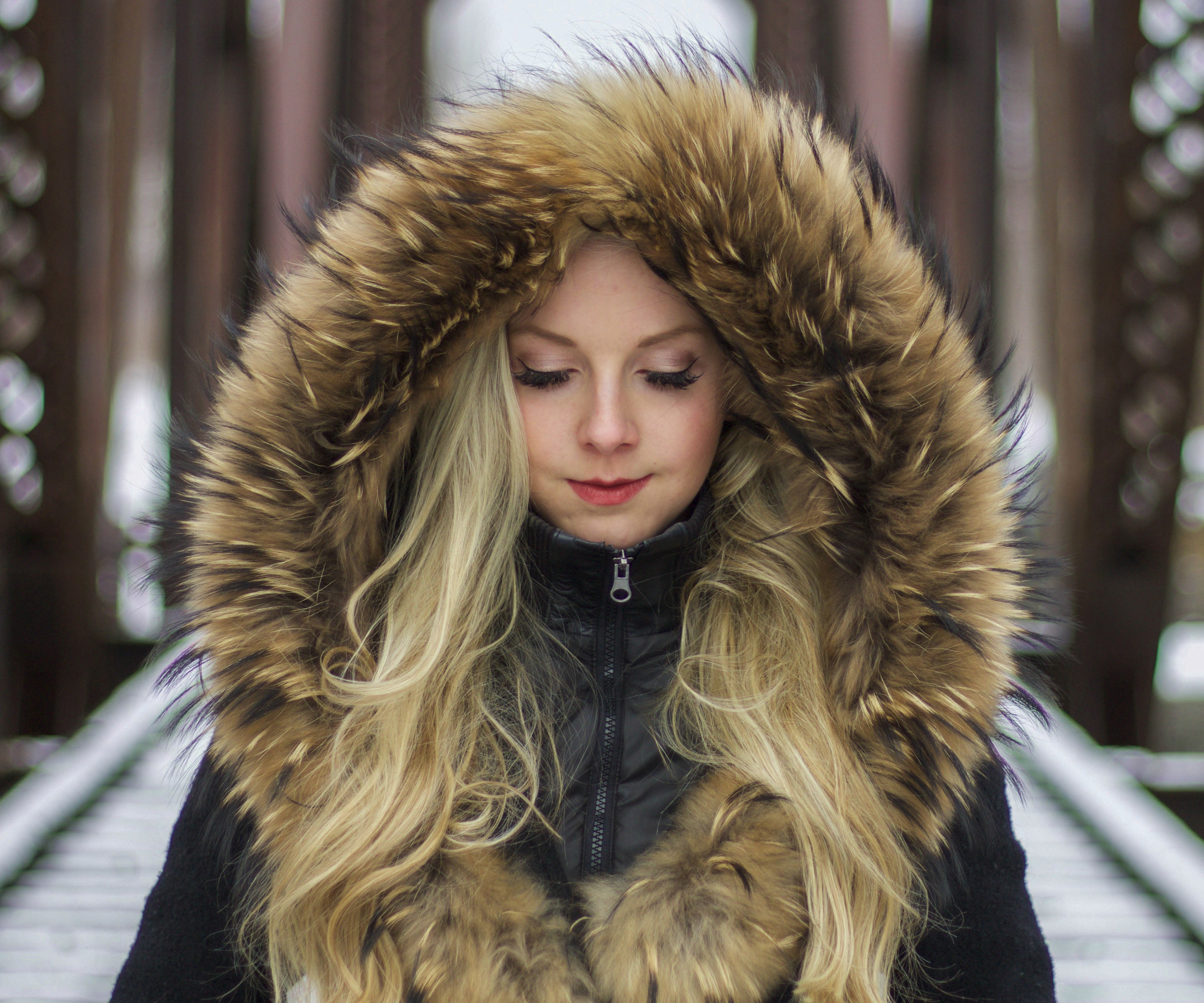
A hood with fur trimming

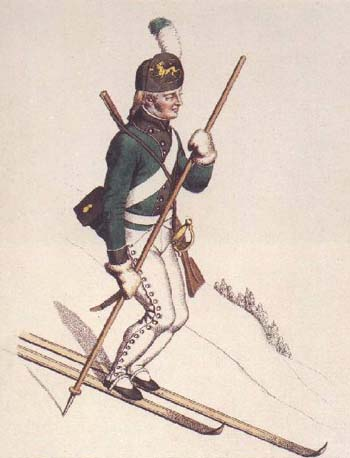
Norwegian soldier wearing a kabuss

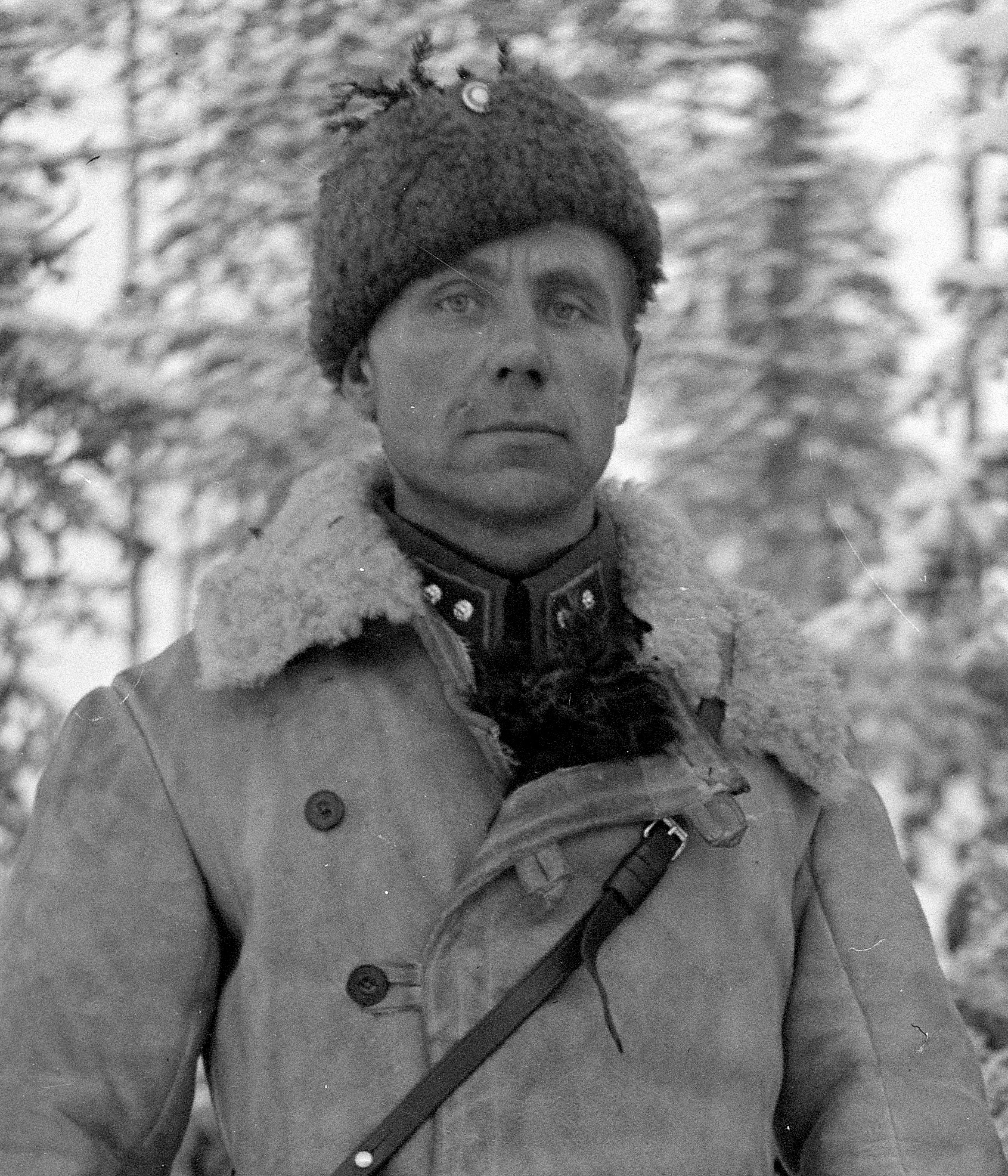
A Finnish soldier wearing a fur hat

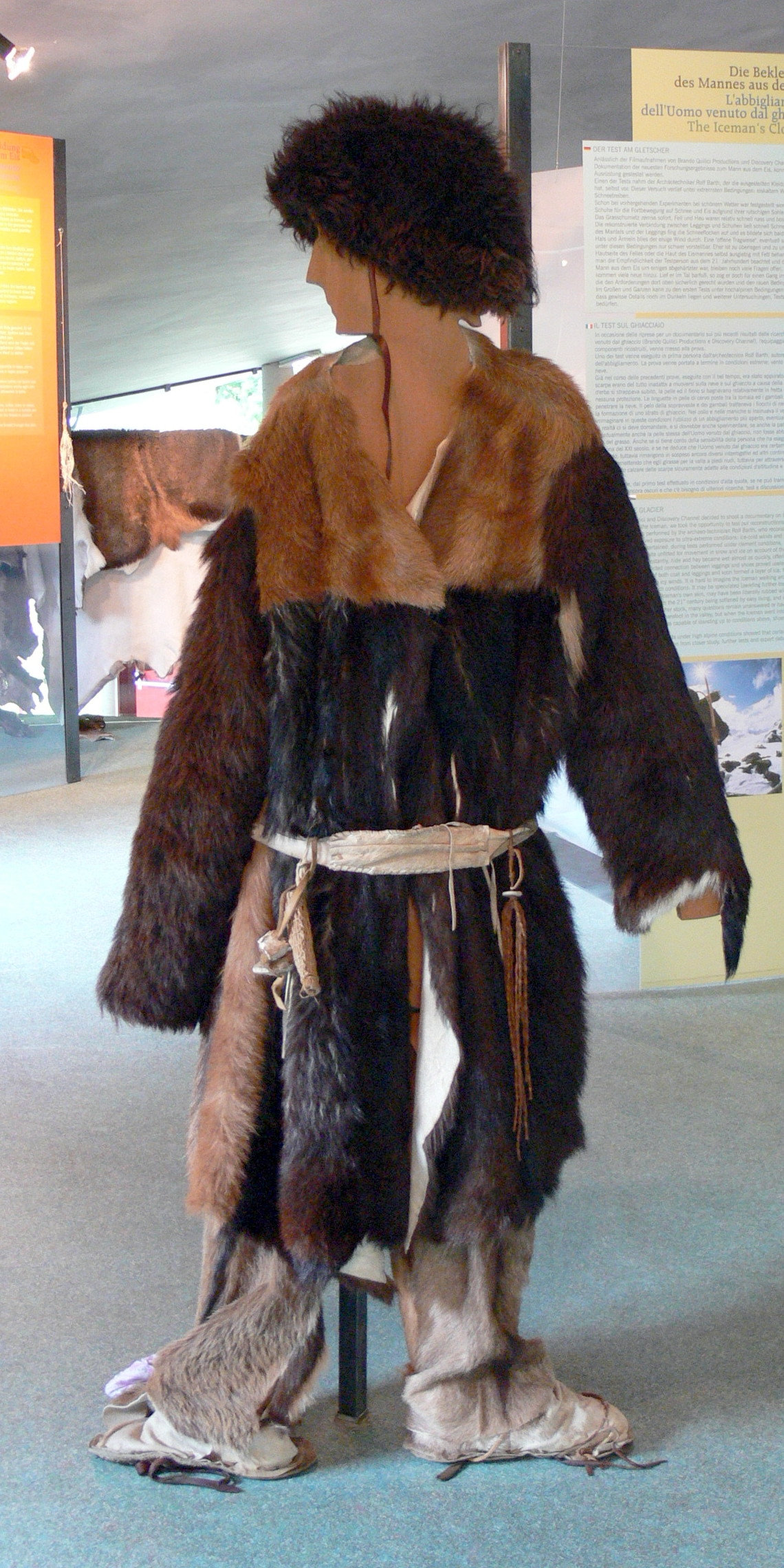
Reconstruction of fur clothing of Ötzi The Iceman

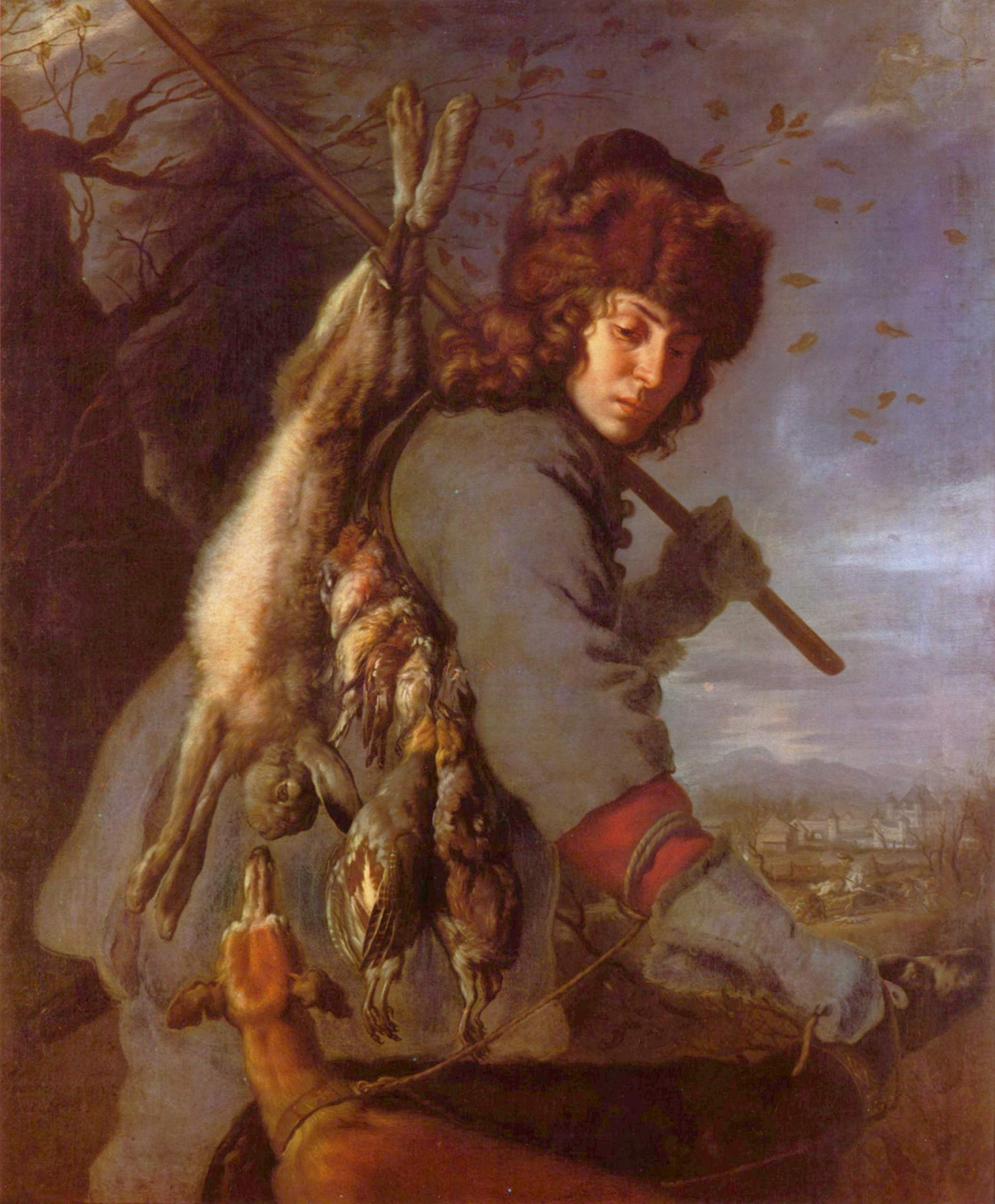
A German hunter (17th century)

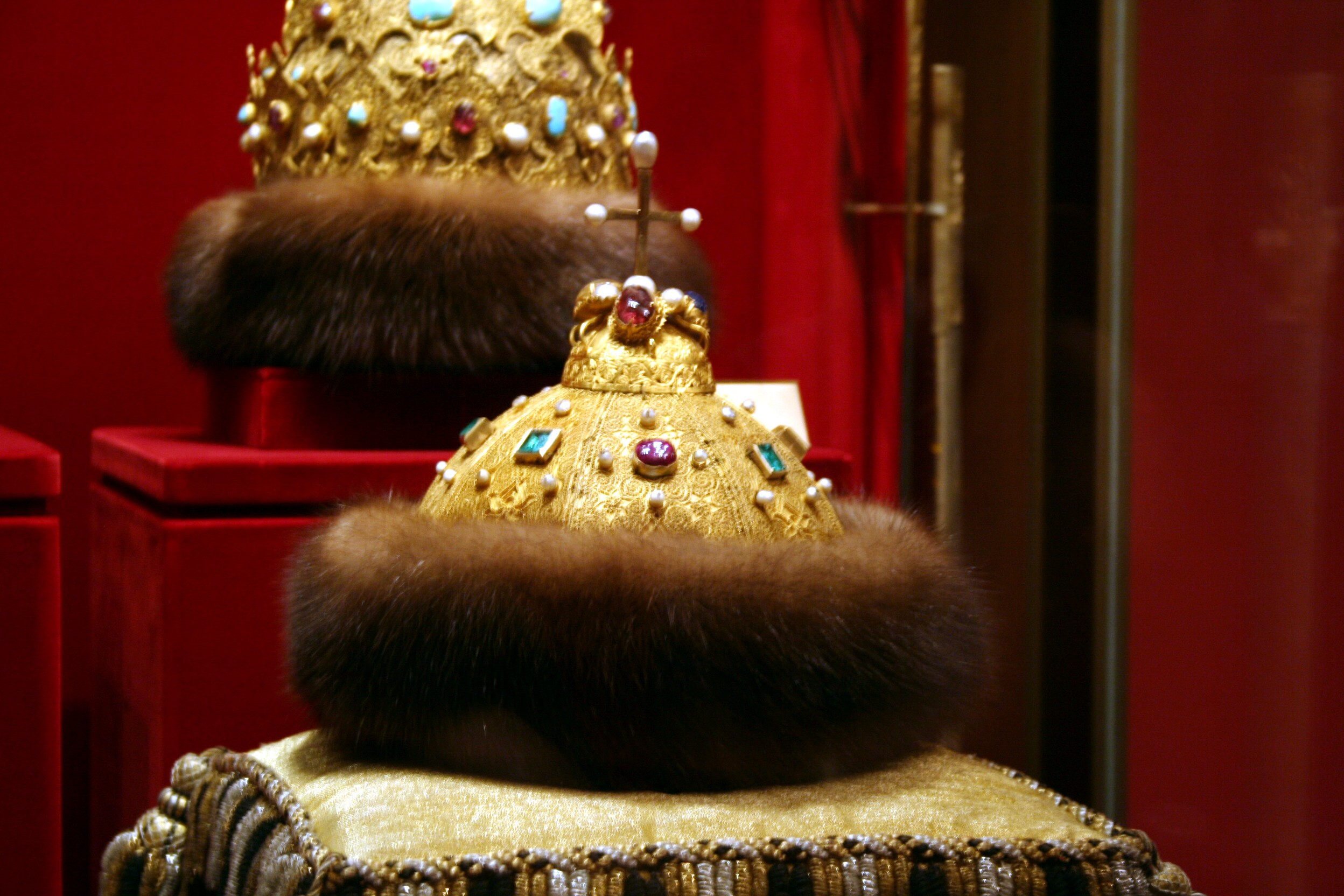
Monomakh's Cap

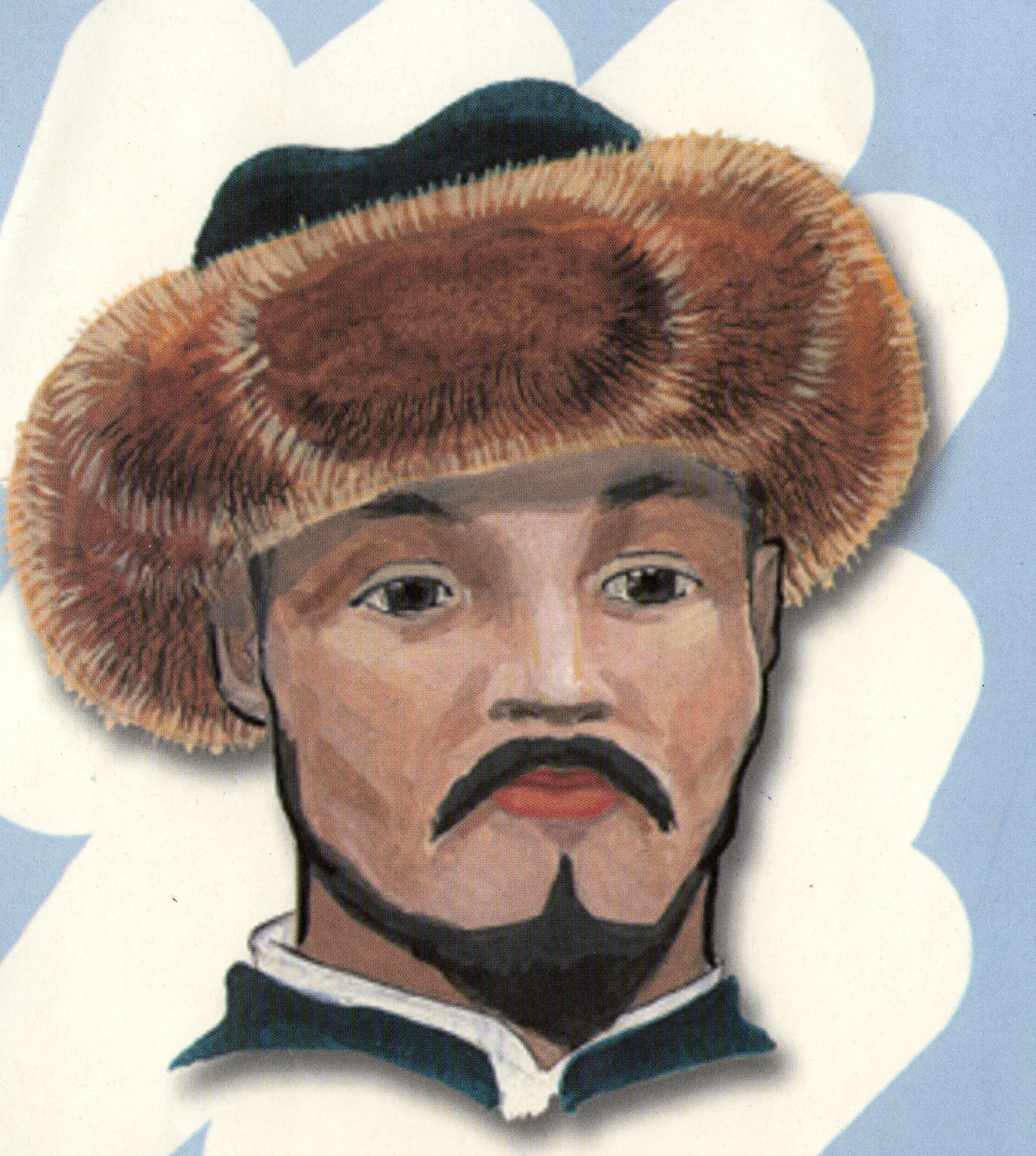
A Kyrgyz tebetey

== List ==
Image	Name	Description
	Bearskin	Tall fur cap derived from mitre caps used to be worn by grenadier units; now a part of a ceremonial uniform
	Beaver hat	A hat made from felted beaver fur. These hats were fashionable across much of Europe during 1550–1850. They were of various shapes, including top hats.
	Borik, boʻrk	Central Asian male and female national headgear
	Boyar hat	Fur hat (also called gorlatnaya hat) worn by Russian nobility between the 15th and 17th centuries, most notably by boyars, as a token of status
	Busby	Busby is the English name for the Hungarian prémes csákó ('fur shako') or kucsma, a military head-dress made of fur, originally worn by Hungarian hussars, later used in other countries as well
	Chugurma	A tall fur hat for men, a national headwear of the Khorezmians in Central Asia. Similar to Papakha of Caucasus
	Colback	Fur headpiece of Turkish origin (the name derived from "kalpak"). It was worn by officers and elite companies
	Coonskin cap	A hat made from the skin and fur of a raccoon, iconically with raccoon's tail.
	Fur wedge cap	Wedge-shaped uniform hat worn by the Canadian military and RCMP.
	Gugiuman	A high-crowned cap that was worn by Hospodars of Wallachia and Moldavia and highest ranked boyars of both principalities into the first half of the nineteenth century. Gugiumans were made of sable fur and were exclusively reserved for the two aforementioned groups of nobles.
	Kalpak	Turkic high-crowned cap, usually made of sheepskin or felt
	Karakul hat	Hat made of karakul fur, usually of wedge shape
	Kolpik	Traditional headgear worn in families of some Chassidic rebbes (the name derived from "kalpak"). It is made of brown fur, as opposed to the black-fur spodik
	Kubanka	Low papakha of Kuban Cossacks
	Kuchma	Traditional tall sheepskin hat of several Centra/East European peoples, e.g., Ukrainian: кучма, romanized: kuchma, Hungarian: kucsma, Romanian: cușmă
	Lambskin hat	Ceremonial military headdress (Russian: барашковая шапка, romanized: barashkovaya shapka) of the Russian Imperial Army, introduced under Emperor Alexander III
	Loslue	Norwegian leather hat with fur or some other lining resembling ushanka
	Malahai	Historical Central Asian hat of high conical shape with flaps, lined with fur or wool.
	Murmolka	Historical Russian tall hat with fur flap
	Palace Grenadiers' hat	The hat of the Imperial Russian ceremonial guards Palace Grenadiers regiment
	Papakha	A sheepskin hat worn by men throughout the Caucasus and also in uniformed regiments in the region and beyond, e.g., by Russian Cossacks. Similar to Chugurma.
	Shtreimel	Fur hat worn by some Ashkenazi Jewish men, mainly members of Hasidic Judaism, on Shabbat and Jewish holidays and other festive occasions
	Spodik	It is made of black fur, as opposed to the brown-fur kolpik
	Šubara	Traditional male winter lambskin hat used mostly by the Serbs, but also Macedonians and Janjevci in their folk attire
	Telpek	traditional headgear of the Turkmens
	Treukh	Historical Russian fur hat with three flaps (back and sides), hence its name, literally meaning "three-eared"
	Tumaq	Central Asian fur hat, multiple types with individual names
	Umqhele	Traditional Zulu circular headband made of fur
	Ushanka	Russian fur hat with ear-covering flaps

== See also ==
- List of hat styles
- List of headgear
- Fur clothing
- Kukeri
