= Umqhele =

Zulu headband made of fur

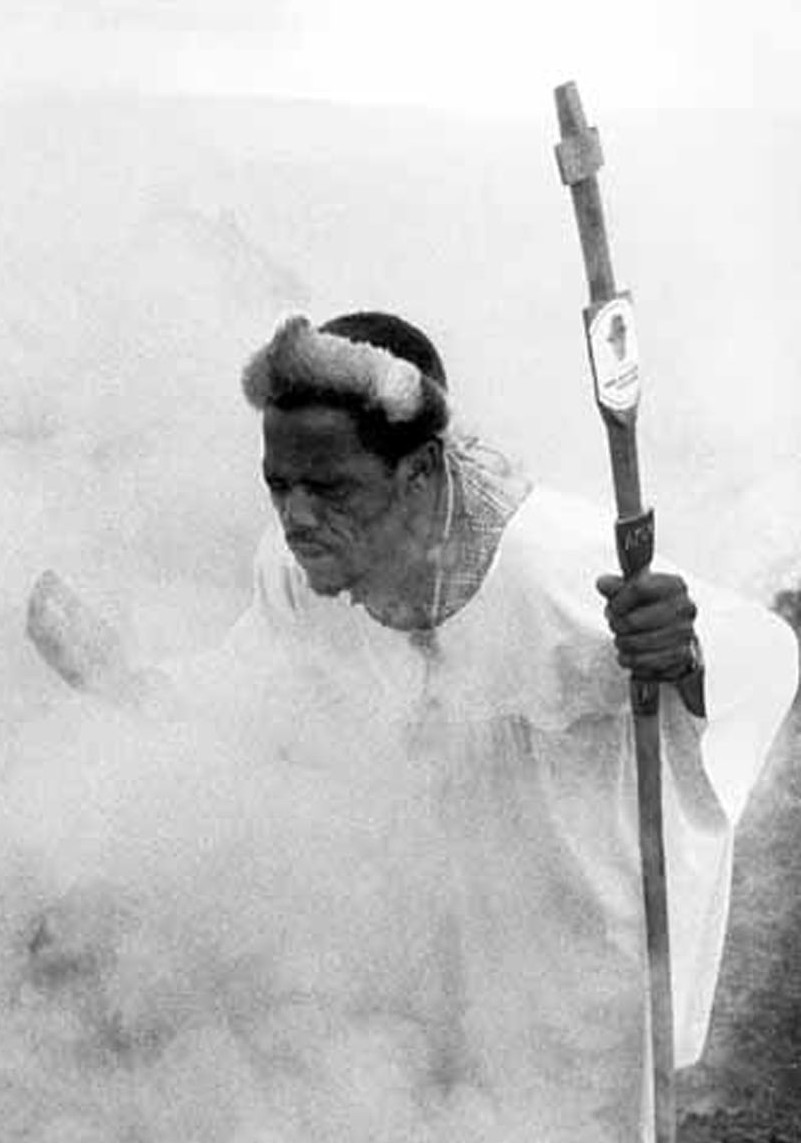
A Nazareth Baptist Church follower wearing an umqhele on a pilgrimage in 2009

An umqhele ([umǃʰɛle], plural imiqhele) is a traditional Zulu circular headband made of fur. Imiqhele were worn by Zulu men prior to colonization of South Africa, especially by soldiers and elites, and are worn by male members of the Nazareth Baptist Church. They are also worn by Ndebele people, who make them from the tails of cattle. Nazareth Baptist Church imiqhele are frequently made from the fur of leopards, antelope, or serval.

== See also ==
- List of fur headgear

== Bibliography ==
- Chakravarty, K. Gandhar (2014). African Nazarites: a comparative religious ethnography of Rastafari and Ibandla lamaNazaretha (Doctoral thesis). University of Montreal. hdl:1866/10536.
