= Coonskin cap =

Hat fashioned from the skin and fur of a raccoon

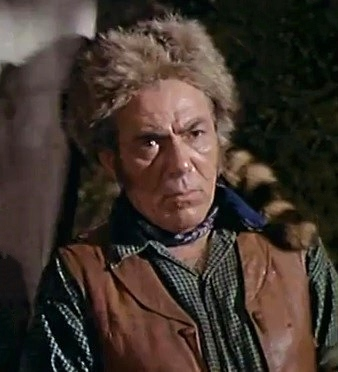
Louis Mercier in Bonanza

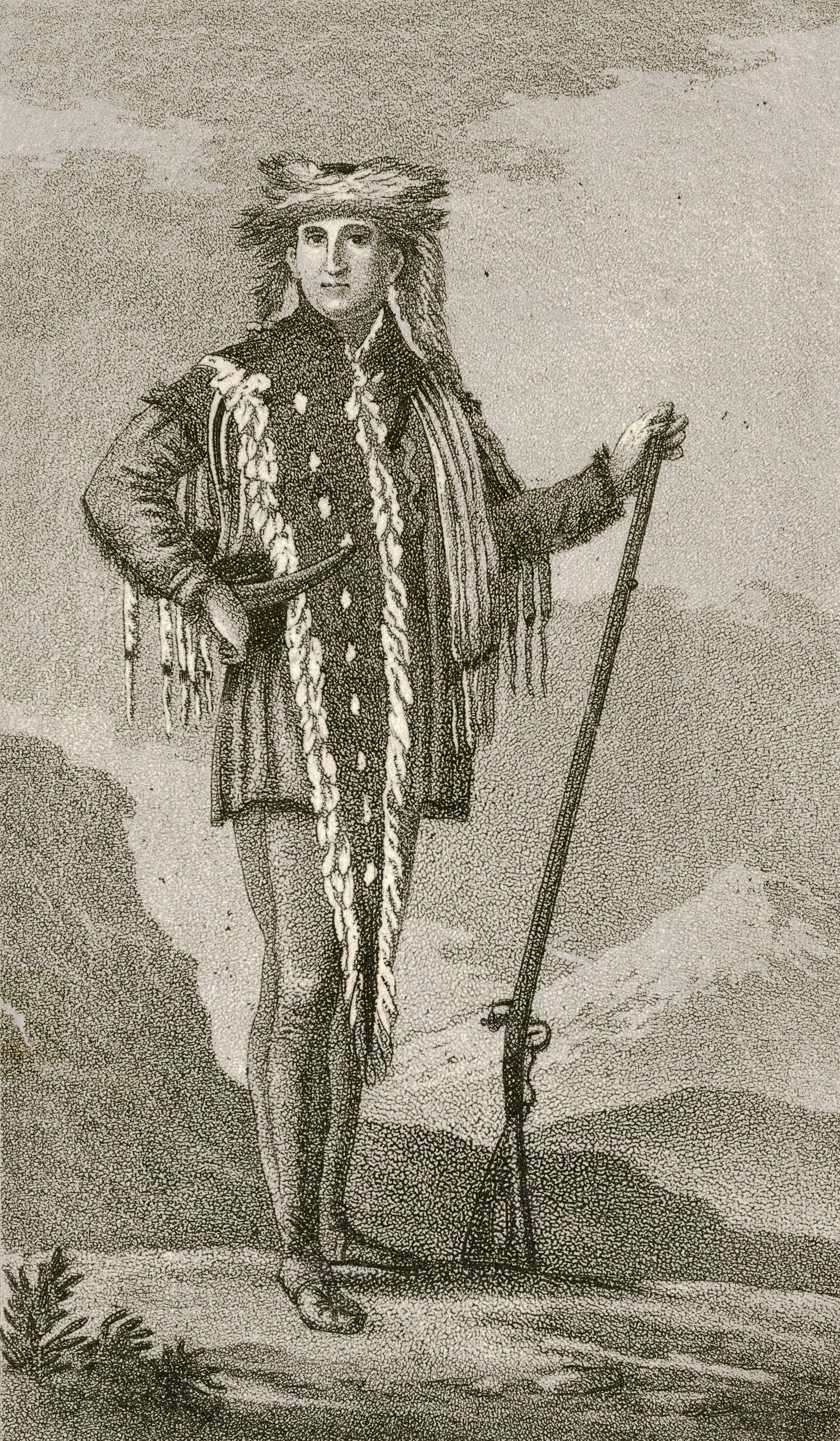
"(Meriwether) Lewis in Indian Dress (Shoshone)," published in 1816

A coonskin cap is a hat fashioned from the skin and fur of a raccoon. The headwear became associated with European Americans occupying lands on the United States borders with Indigenous nations in the late 18th century and the first half of the 19th century. The cap became highly popular among boys in the U.S., Canada, United Kingdom, and Australia in the 1950s.

== History ==
=== Origin ===
The coonskin cap is an iconic cap associated with Trans-Appalachia and the early American frontier. Originally designed by the Native American peoples of Appalachia (modern day North Carolina, Virginia, Kentucky, Tennessee, and West Virginia); the style was later adopted by early pioneers to the area following the decades after the American Revolution. Individuals associated with the headwear generally include Daniel Boone, Davy Crockett, Meriwether Lewis, and Joseph L. Meek. Early media such as the song The Hunters of Kentucky helped introduce the coonskin cap in the popular culture of American psyche.

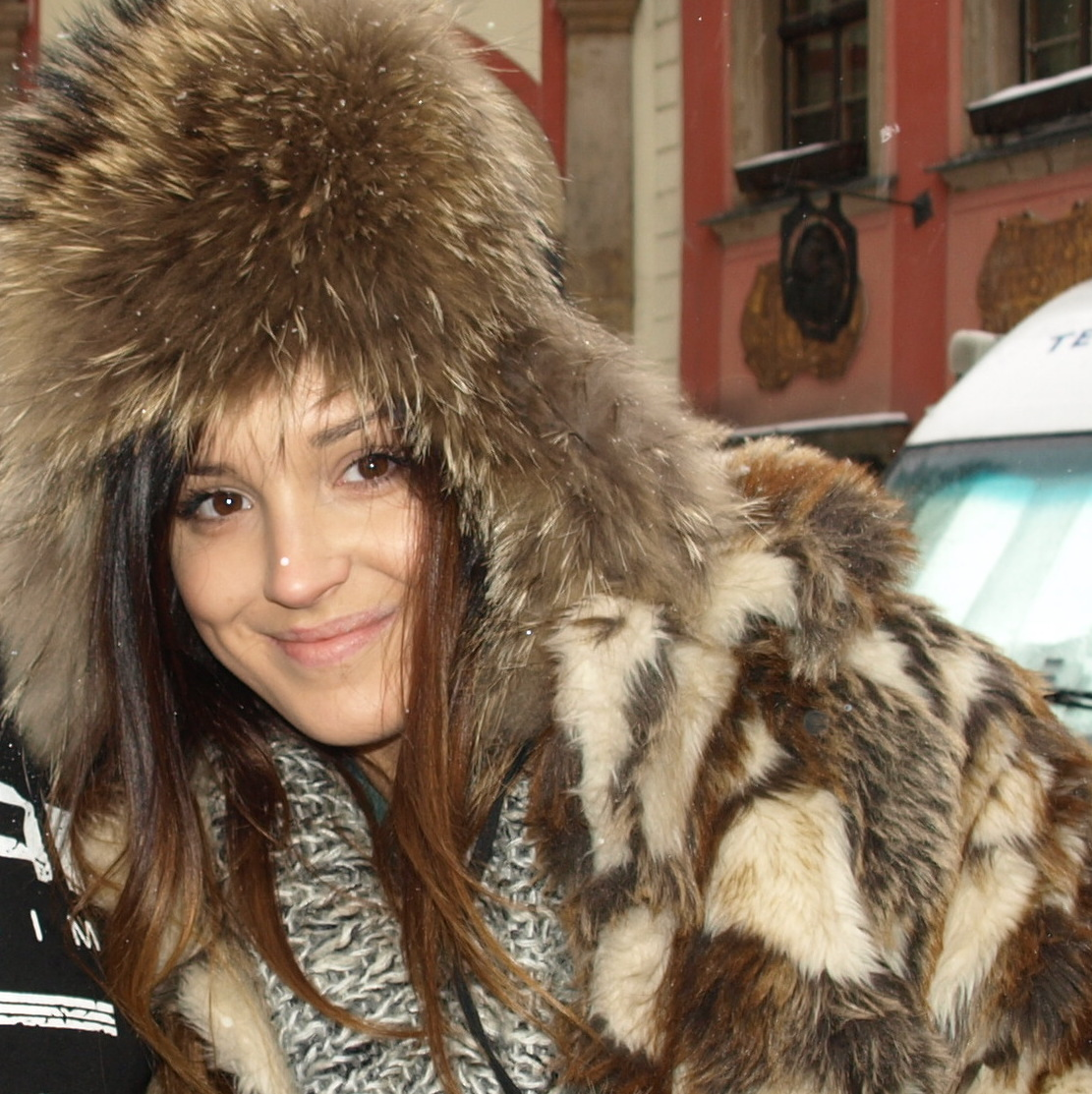
Marina Łuczenko with raccoon ushanka (2010).

=== Estes Kefauver ===
Politician Estes Kefauver, a Democrat from Appalachian East Tennessee, adopted the coonskin cap as a personal trademark during his successful 1948 campaign for election to the United States Senate. Tennessee political boss E. H. Crump had published advertisements accusing Kefauver of being a raccoon-like Communist puppet. In response, Kefauver put on a coonskin cap during a speech in Memphis, proclaiming: "I may be a pet coon, but I'm not Boss Crump's pet coon." He continued to use the coonskin cap as a trademark throughout his political career, which included unsuccessful campaigns for the Democratic presidential nomination in 1952 and 1956, an unsuccessful campaign for the Vice Presidency as Adlai Stevenson's running mate in 1956, and successful Senatorial re-election campaigns in 1954 and 1960.

=== 1950s fad ===
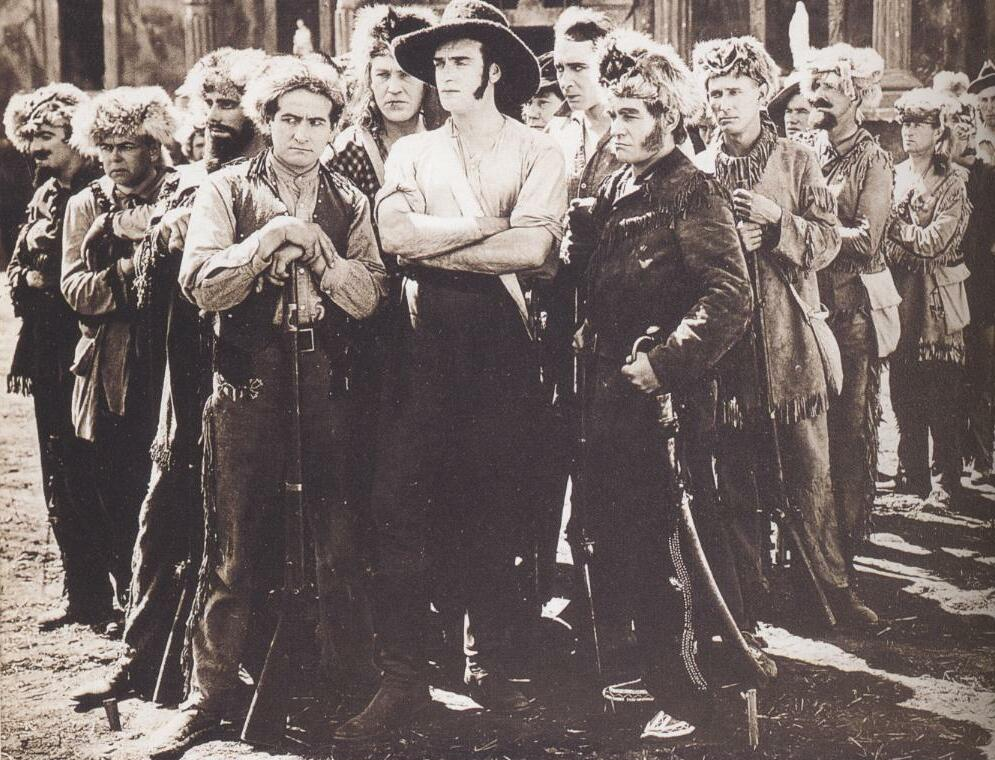
Martyrs of the Alamo (1915)

In the 20th century, the iconic association was in large part due to Disney's television program Disneyland and the first three Davy Crockett episodes starring Fess Parker, which aired from December 1954 to February 1955. In the episodes, which once again made Crockett into one of the most popular men in the country, the frontier hero was portrayed wearing a coonskin cap. The show spawned several Disneyland Davy Crockett sequels as well as other similar shows and movies, with many of them featuring Parker as the lead actor. Parker went on to star in a Daniel Boone television series (1964–1970), again wearing a coonskin cap.

Crockett's new popularity initiated a fad among boys all over the United States as well as a Davy Crockett craze in the United Kingdom. The look of the cap that was marketed to young boys was typically simplified; it was usually a faux fur lined skull cap with a raccoon tail attached. A variation was marketed to young girls as the Polly Crockett hat. It was similar in style to the boys' cap, including the long tail, but was made of all-white fur (faux or possibly rabbit). At the peak of the fad, coonskin caps sold at a rate of 5,000 caps a day. By the end of the 1950s, Crockett's popularity waned and the fad slowly died out. The fad is recalled by numerous cultural references, such as the wearing of coonskin caps as part of The Junior Woodchucks uniform in Disney's Donald Duck comics. Novelist Thomas Pynchon referenced both the hat and the fashion in his novel V., where he refers to the hat as a "bushy Freudian hermaphrodite symbol".

== See also ==
- List of hat styles
- List of fur headgear
- Ushanka
