= Adras (fabric) =

Natural handmade fabric

- Type: Fabric
- Material: 50% silk - 50% cotton
- Production method: Weaving
- Production process: Handicraft
- Place of origin: Tajikistan / Uzbekistan

Traditional knowledge and skills of production of the atlas and adras fabrics
- UNESCO Intangible Cultural Heritage
- Country: Tajikistan
- Reference: 01484
- Region: Asia and the Pacific

Inscription history
- Inscription: 2023 (18th session)
- List: Representative

Margilan Crafts Development Centre, safeguarding of the atlas and adras making traditional technologies
- UNESCO Intangible Cultural Heritage
- Country: Uzbekistan
- Reference: 01254
- Region: Asia and the Pacific

Inscription history
- Inscription: 2017 (12th session)
- List: Good Safeguarding Practices

Adras is a natural handmade fabric that consists of 50 percent silk fibers and 50 percent cotton. Adras is traditionally woven in Uzbekistan and Tajikistan. The fabric is also called "pādshāhī" or "shāhī" (from Tajik, meaning "royal"), indicating its exceptional value associated with an elaborate and costly manufacturing process as well as a rich and sophisticated appearance. Adras is characterized by its strength, rich colors and the possibility of using it for a long period of time without losing its properties.

The practice of making atlas and adras in traditional ways by the Margilan Craft Center was inscribed on the UNESCO List of Intangible Cultural Heritage of Humanity in 2017.

== History ==
In Central Asia (Bukhara, Samarkand, Khujand, Namangan, Margilan), the production of silk and semi-silk fabrics reached a special development in the 19th - early 20th centuries. In modern history, a festival of Adras and Atlas takes place in Tajikistan. In Uzbekistan, the “Silk and Spices” festival is held every two years in Bukhara, where Adras is also presented.

== Description ==
Adras is softer than pure silk and is therefore often used to make clothing, accessories, bedding and home textiles. The fabrics are often decorated with Uzbek ornaments, which have long been a national heritage and part of the region's culture. Natural plant seeds are used by craftsmen to dye the fibers. For example, the Uzbek ornament consists of rich, noble and natural shades.

Adras is made by hand and has a width of 32 to 55 cm, as a larger width is not possible on looms. In Bukhara, the fabric has its own gisar abrob pattern with the motif “Doiragul, Kuzagul” - a small pot. The pattern of the Adra is arranged in three longitudinal rows. The main colors of the patterns are red and yellow on a white background. Oval-shaped drawings are filled with purple, yellow and blue lines. There are yellow ovals in the middle of the burgundy jugs.

== Gallery ==
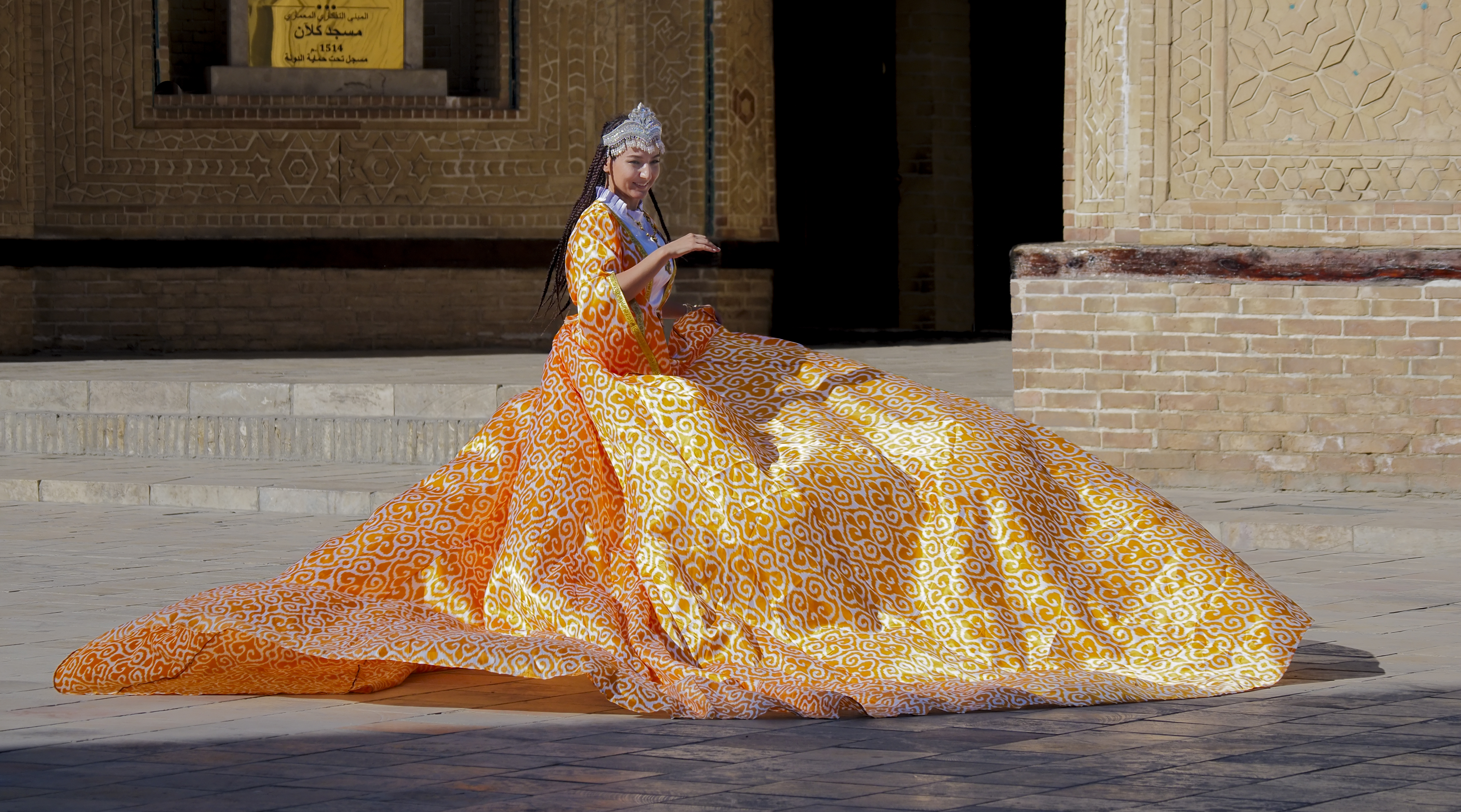
Woman parading in traditional Uzbek long adras dress in Po-i-Kalyan complex, Bukhara, Uzbekistan

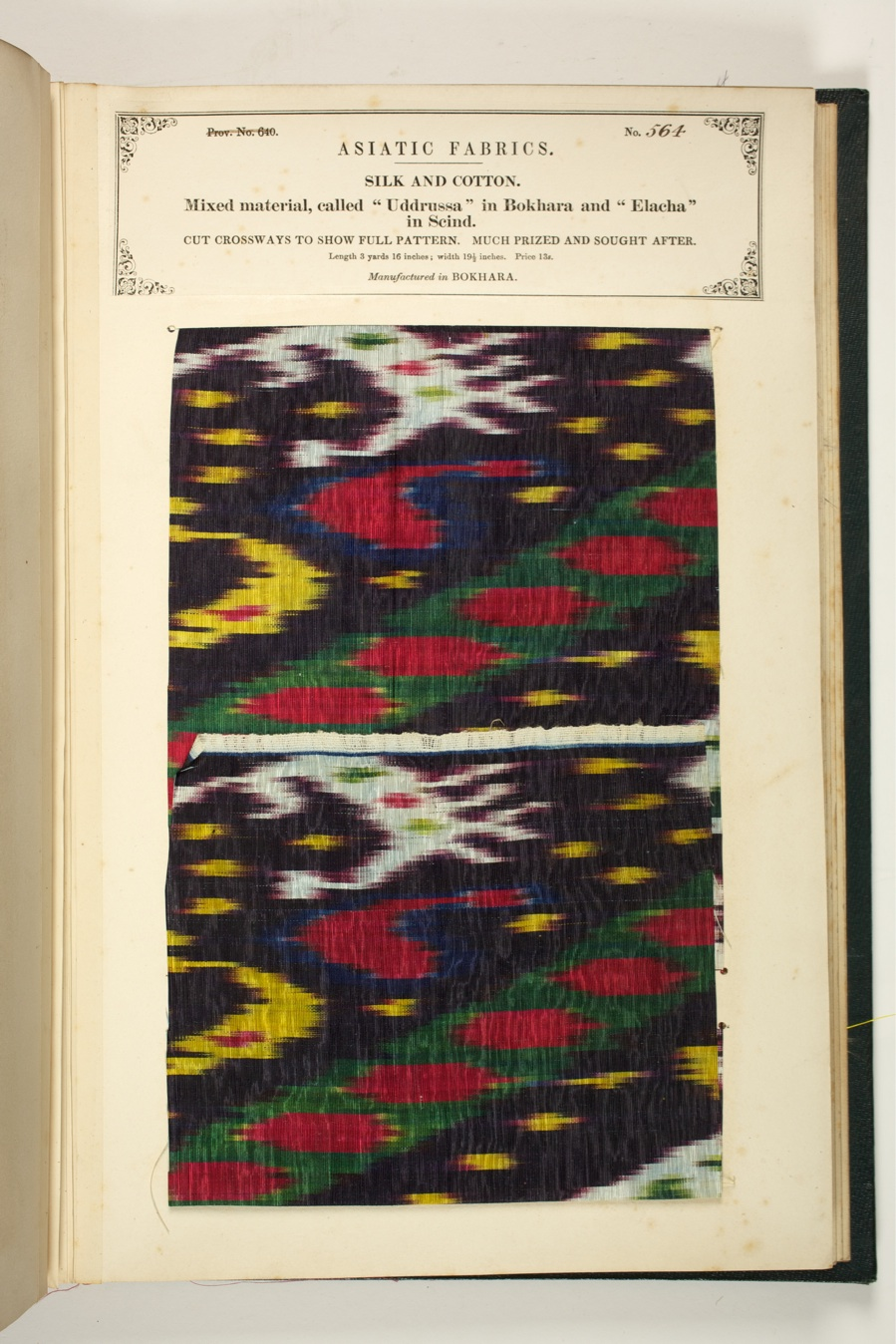
Adras with red, black, white, green patterns

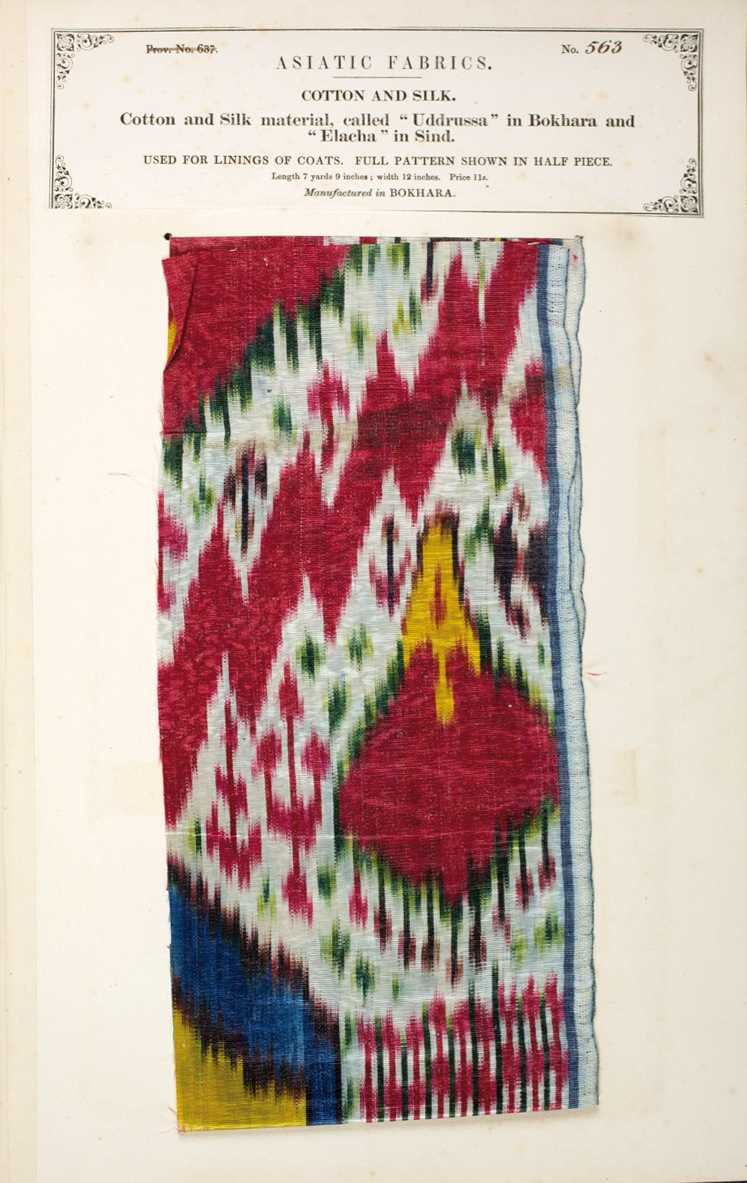
Adras with red, white, yellow, black, green patterns

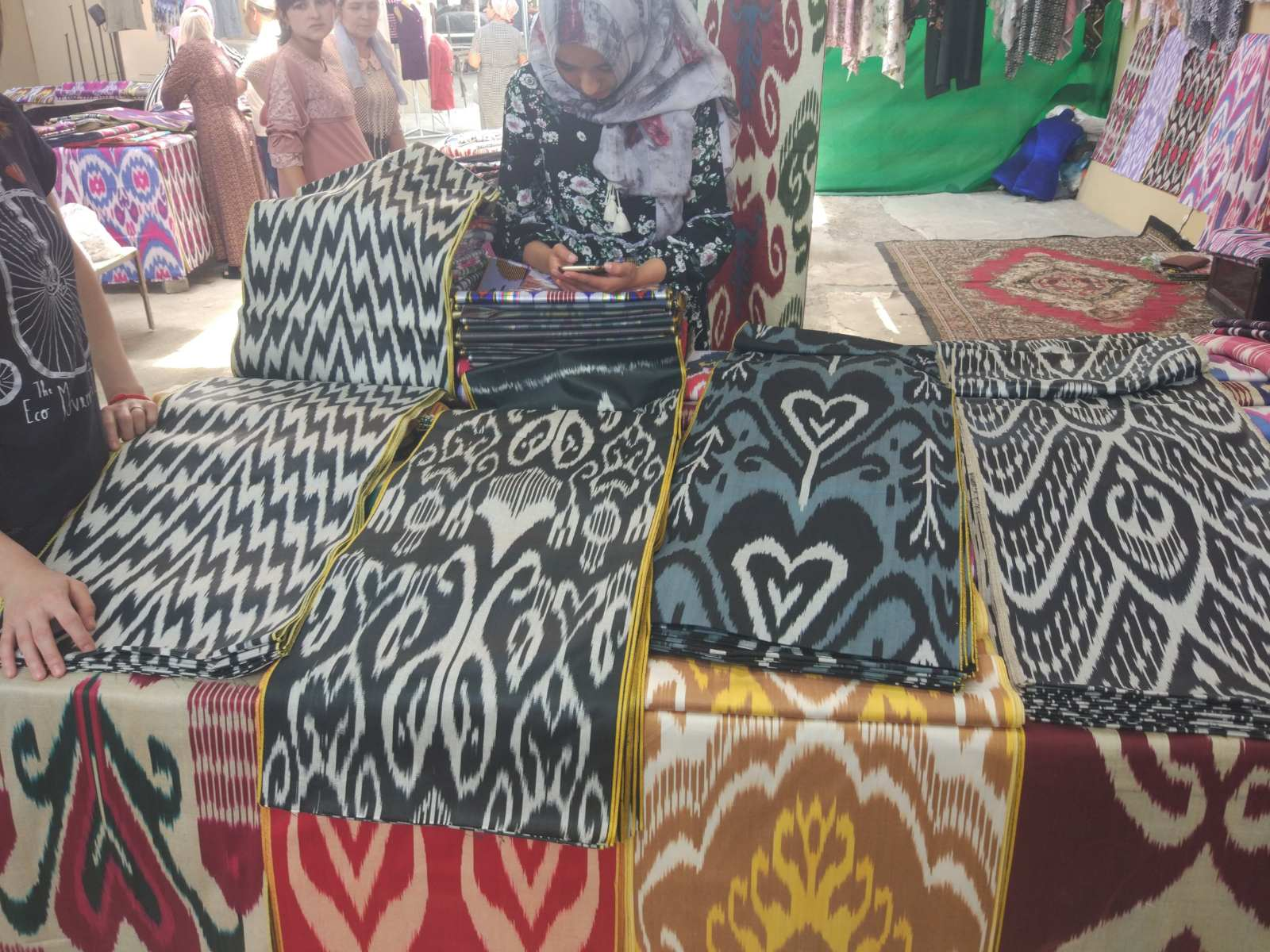
Showcase with adras in Uzbekistan
