= Chugurma =

Traditional head cap of Khorezm

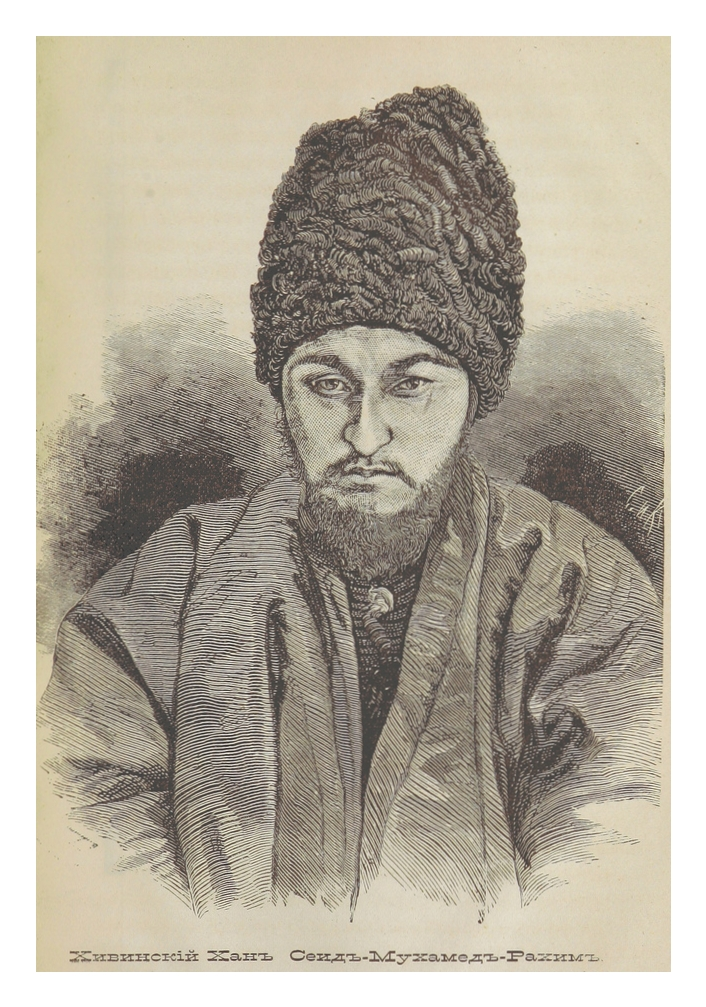
- Mohammed Rahim Khan II. (1845–1910)
- Type: Fur hat
- Material: Astrakhan fur, karakul fur, marten fur, otter fur, fox fur, muskrat fur, sheep fur, goat fur, cotton, calico
- Place of origin: Central Asia, especially Khorezm
- Manufacturer: Chugurmadoz (traditional craftsmen)

Chugurma (Uzbek: Choʻgirma) is a tall fur hat for men, a national headwear of the Khorezmians in Central Asia, whose appearance reflects the history of ancient Khorezm. During the existence of the Khanate of Khiva, great attention was paid to the quality and practicality of the headwear and chugurma were widely used.

== Description ==
One of the main advantages of this headwear is that a special microclimate is created under this often light hat. In summer, a chugurma protects from overheating and in winter from the cold.

At the time of the Khanate of Khiva, the chugurma also indicated the social status of the wearer. For example, a chugurma made of astrakhan fur or karakul fur was a symbol of belonging to a high state or religious office. In some cases, for example for a khan or other high-ranking officials, it was made of furs with long, curly hair and a high fashionable hat corresponded to the price of a camel or a domestic cow with a calf.

A chugurma is one of the symbols of a man as a male fur hat Therefore, this headwear is highly valued by the inhabitants of Khorezm. It is reported that until the 1930s, when a girl was to be married, a chugurma was thrown at the groom with all his might, if he fell, the marriage would have been denied.

The hats differ in appearance, besides the height, mainly in the material from which they are made. More expensive chugurma, possibly reserved for holidays, were sewn from a good gray or golden astrakhan or from marten fur, otter fur, fox fur or muskrat fur. The simple ones were made from the furs of a special breed of sheep with silky and curly fur, the long-haired ones from sheep or goat furs. Men of middle age preferred gray, older white and young colored chugurma.

== Production ==
The hat called chugurma is made by a master who is called chugurmadoz. In the general, very original fur dressing, the lamb fur is tanned by covering it with bitter sour milk every other day and placing it on a support in the sun for three days, then the remaining fat is scraped off. From the thus prepared fur, a chugurma can be hand-sewn in two to three hours. The inside of the cap was lined with cotton and lined with dyed calico. The production of chugurma in Khorezm was traditionally carried out only by men. The craft was inherited, the masters who mastered this art perfectly were especially appreciated and were respected residents in their villages. The production of the chugurma as a separate profession has been preserved among the Khorezmians to this day, especially the hats are in demand by tourists as a souvenir.

== See also ==
- List of hat styles
- List of fur headgear
