= Faye Wei Wei =

English painter

- Born: Faye Hoi Wing Wong; 1994 (age 31–32); Tooting, London, England
- Education: Slade School of Fine Art
- Years active: 2016–present

Faye Hoi Wing Wong (born 1994), known professionally as Faye Wei Wei, is an English painter. She was named one to watch by British Vogue and It's Nice That in 2018 and a hot name in the art world by The Sunday Times in 2021.

== Early life ==
Wei Wei was born in Tooting, South London to Hong Kong parents. She graduated from the Slade School of Fine Art in 2016 with a Bachelor of Arts (BA). She won the Cass Art Prize for graduating students. As of 2024, Wei Wei is pursuing a Master of Fine Arts (MFA) at Yale Art School.

== Career ==
After graduating, Wei Wei completed the Hoy Hoy residency. In 2017, Wei Wei had her debut solo exhibition at age 23 titled Anemones and Lovers at London's Cob Gallery. Dazed called her "London's dreamiest painter". In 2018, she had solo exhibitions at the Centre for Chinese Contemporary Art in Manchester and the SADE Gallery in Los Angeles. She also did a joint display with Zoë Paul in Athens among other group exhibitions. In addition, Wei Wei contributed paintings to Hannah Weiland's Shrimps SS18 and RTW AW19 collections at London Fashion Week.

In 2019, Wei Wei was awarded a commission by the British Council Hong Kong and Phillips auctioneers to create an installation in Tai Kwun for the SPARK festival. She returned to Cob Gallery with the solo exhibition I've Always Been a Weeper at the Cinema.

Via Éditions Lutanie, Wei Wei's book Hooker's Green Lake was published in 2020. She also had a solo exhibition at Galerie Kandlhofer in Vienna; she would return in 2021 and 2022. The former titled Moon was synchronised with Sun at Isetan in Tokyo. Also in 2021, Wei Wei collaborated with Simone Rocha and H&M on a pop-up book.

In 2023, Wei Wei solo exhibited at Situations in New York and Alkinois Art Space in Athens. Wei Wei reunited with Éditions Lutanie for the publication of her monograph Portals, which collects her work over 14 years, in 2024.

== Bibliography ==
- Hooker's Green Lake (2020)
- Portals (2024)

== Exhibitions ==
=== Solo ===
- Anemones and Lovers (2017) at Cob Gallery (London)
- Aristotle's Lantern (2017) at Cob Gallery (London)
- CFCCA Presents: Faye Wei Wei (2018) at the Centre For Chinese Contemporary Art (Manchester)
- Sweet Bitter, Valentine (2018) at the SADE Gallery (Los Angeles)
- I've Always Been a Weeper at the Cinema (2019) at the Cob Gallery (London)
- If You Sat Long Enough You Could See a Flower Bloom (2020) at Galerie Kandlhofer (Vienna)
- Sun (2021) at Isetan the Space (Tokyo)
- Moon (2021) at Galerie Kandlhofer (Vienna)
- The Moon Balloon of New York City (2022) at Galerie Kandlhofer (Vienna)
- Tiny Melody Chamber (2023) at Situations (New York)
- Bird Blowing Love (2023) at Alkinois Art Space (Athens)
- The Sounds of the Organ Pushing the Walls of the Cathedral Outwards (2024) at Galerie Kandlhofer (Vienna)

==== Installations ====
- Neon Spark (2019) at Tai Kwun (Hong Kong)

=== Group ===
- Eclectic Dreamers (2016) at Siegfried Contemporary
- Summer Blue (2016) at Lychee One (London)
- To a God Unknown (2017) at Mrs (Queens)
- Marzanna, Yours Again (2018) at Hot Wheels (Athens), with Zoë Paul
- Into Raptures (2018) at Barbara Feinman Gallery (Los Angeles)
- dreamin' wild (2018) at Keteleer Gallery (Antwerp)
- The Clarkory Show (2018) at Museum Gallery (Brooklyn)
- Rhapsodies at Ping Pong Gallery (Brussels)
- New Work Part III: Subject (2018) at Cob Gallery (London)
- The Picture is a Forest (2019) at Gallerie Kandlhofer (Vienna)
- and I'll have a pepper-shaker in my cave, so laugh (2019) at LTD Los Angeles
- Shifts in Time (2019) at Over the Influence (Los Angeles)
- Topian Gardens (2019) at Gallery Vacancy (Shanghai)
- A High Hang (2019) at Eccleston Project Space (London)
- A Couple of: The Dual-mechanism of the New Generation of Asian Artists (2021) at Hive Art (Beijing)
- A Plant Has Been One of my Best Friends for a Long Time Now (2022) at Situations (New York)
- Through the Prism (2022) at Gillian Jason Gallery (London)
- Nada New York (2023) at Situations (New York)
- The Gallery of Delights on Earth (2024) at Gallery 46 (London)
- The Last Seahorse Neighing in an Egg (2025) at Ninetto (Athens)
