= Ushanka =

Russian fur cap with ear flaps

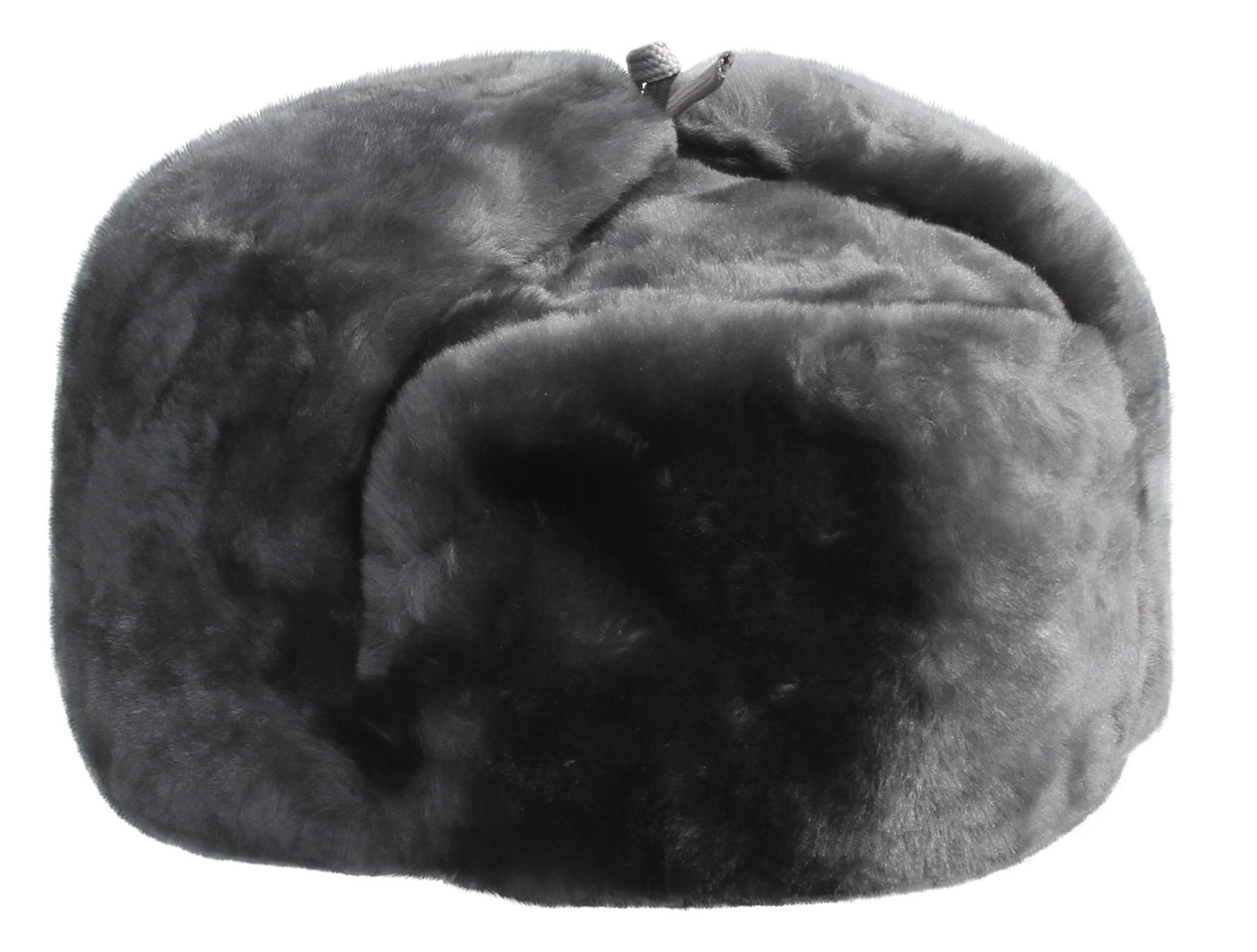
Sheepskin ushanka winter hat with earflaps

An ushanka (Russian: ушанка, IPA: [ʊ.ˈʂan.kə], from уши, ushi, 'ears'), also called an ushanka-hat (Russian: шапка-ушанка, romanized: shapka-ushanka, [ˈʂap.kə ʊ.ˈʂan.kə]), is a Russian fur hat with ear-covering flaps that can be tied up on the crown of the cap, or fastened at the chin to protect the ears, jaw, and lower chin from the cold.

An alternative way to wear is to bend the flaps back and tie them behind the head, which is called "ski-style"—this offers less protection from the elements, but much better visibility, essential for high-speed skiing. The dense fur also offers some protection against blunt impacts to the head. They are also traditionally worn in the Baltic region including Sweden, Finland, Estonia, Norway and the entire Eastern European region.

== Materials ==
Ushanka hats are made from sheepskin (tsigeyka or mouton), karakul, rabbit, muskrat, mink and many other furs. Artificial fur hats are also manufactured and are referred to as "fish fur" since the material is not from any real animal. The simplest "fish fur" of ushankas was made of wool pile with cloth substrate and cloth top, with the exception of the flaps, which had the pile exposed. Mink fur ushankas are widely used in the Arctic regions of Russia, protecting the ears and chin of the wearer even from "deep frost", which is around −70 to −40 °C (−94 to −40 °F).

== History ==
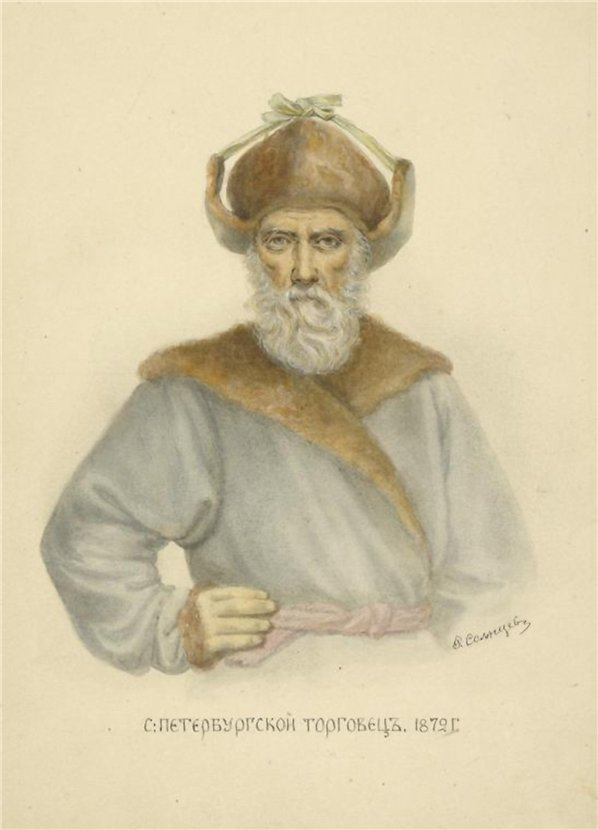
A treukh

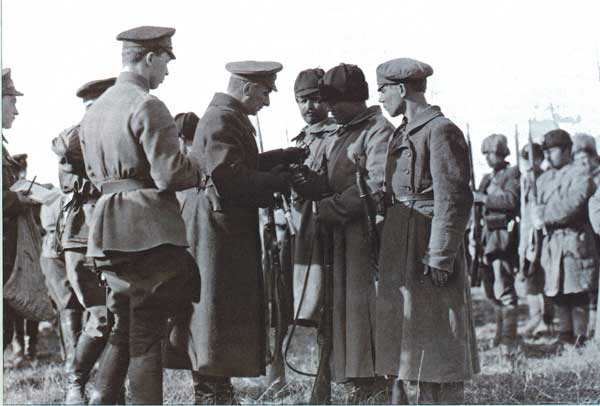
Alexander Kolchak decorating his troops wearing kolchakovkas

Hats with fur earflaps have been known for centuries. The design of ushanka with a perfectly round crown was developed in the 17th century when in central and northern Russia a hat with two earflaps and a backflap called treukh ("three-eared") was worn. The modern ushanka design from 1917 is also inspired by the Norwegian norvezhka, a hat which was invented by Norwegian arctic explorers. The main difference from the treukh is that the earflaps of the norvezhka were much longer. In addition, Cossacks of the Kuban have influenced the design of modern Ushanka through interaction with peoples from Central Asia and Caucasus.

In 1917 during the Russian Civil War, the ruler of Siberia, Aleksandr Kolchak, introduced a winter uniform hat, commonly referred to as a kolchakovka, c. 1918. It was similar to the ushanka. However, Kolchak and the White Army lost the war, and their headgear was not adopted in the new Soviet Union.

Red Army soldiers instead wore the budenovka, which was made of felt. It was designed to resemble historical bogatyr helmets, and did not provide much protection from the cold.

During the Winter War against Finland, organizational failures and inadequate equipment left many Soviet troops vulnerable to cold, and many died of exposure. The Finnish army had much better equipment including an ushanka-style fur hat, the turkislakki M36, (Note: 'turkis'+'lakki' literally means "fur hat" in Finnish) introduced in 1936. In 1939, shortly before the Winter War, the slightly improved turkislakki M39 was introduced, and is still in use today. After the Winter War, the Red Army received completely redesigned winter uniforms. Budenovkas were finally replaced with ushankas based on the Finnish example. Officers were issued fur ushankas; other ranks received ushankas made with plush or "fish fur". When they experienced the harsh Russian winter, for example during the Battle of Moscow, German soldiers started to wear ushankas and other Soviet-type winter gear, as their uniforms did not provide adequate protection from the extreme cold.

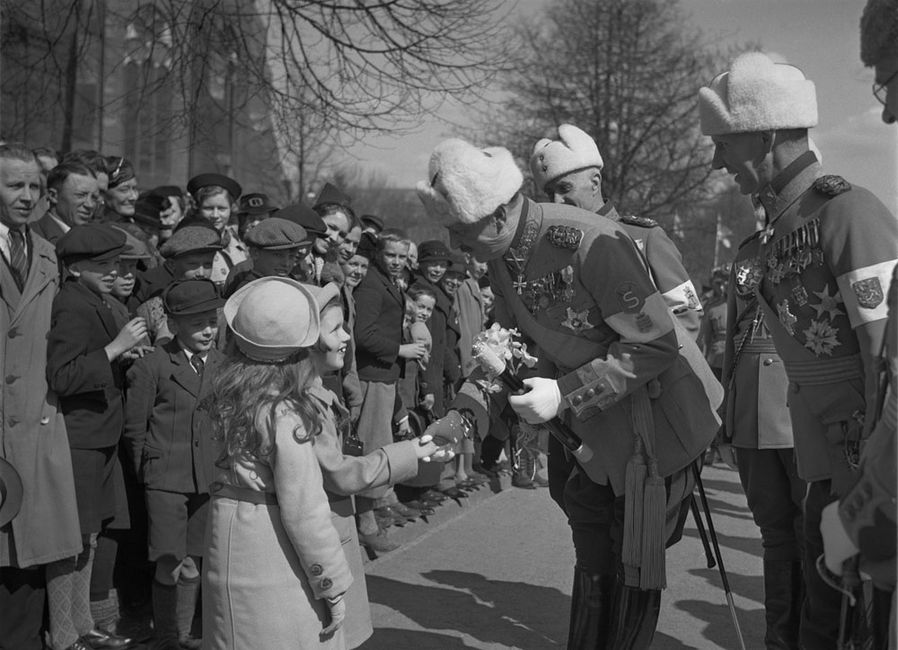
General Carl Gustaf Emil Mannerheim of the Finnish Army wearing white turkislakki in 1938

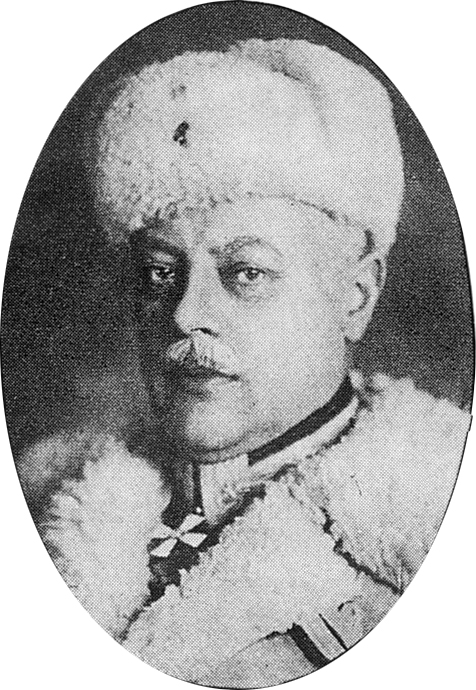
General Harald Åkerman

== Current use ==
Identified with Soviet rule and issued in all Warsaw Pact armies, the ushanka has since become a part of the winter uniform for military and police forces in Canada and other Western countries with a cold winter. Gray (American civilian police), green (for camouflage), blue (police, United States Coast Guard, and United States Post Office) and black versions are in current usage. In 2013, the Russian army announced that soldiers will get a new ushanka with a rounder crown and small sealable openings in the flaps for wearing headphones. It is also still used by the Polish armed forces.

The ushanka was used by the East German authorities before German reunification, and remained part of the German police uniform in winter afterwards. In the Finnish Defence Forces, a gray hat is used with M62 uniform and a green one of different design is a part of M91 and M05 winter dress. Armoured troops have a black hat (M92), while generals may wear a white M39 hat. The Royal Canadian Mounted Police use a "regulation hat" (between an ushanka and an aviator hat), made of muskrat fur. This replaced the former Canadian military fur wedge cap. Similar ones are used by Toronto Transit Commission staff during winter.

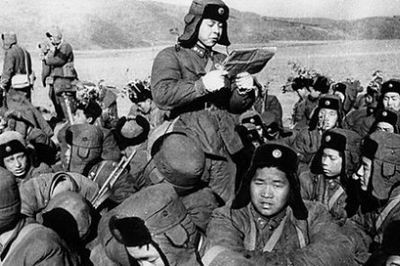
Lei Feng reading to fellow soldiers wearing ushankas

A similar type of headgear is worn in China's People's Liberation Army's winter uniform. Featured in an iconic propaganda image of Lei Feng, this type of hat is often called by Chinese "the Lei Feng hat" (雷锋帽, Lei Feng mao).

It is claimed that British wartime airmen visiting the Kola Inlet to help to protect the Arctic convoys quickly started to wear ushankas because their own uniform hats were not warm enough, but "kept the ear flaps tied up to the crown as any Russian would, because it was considered unmanly to wear them down." However, in the Russian military up to this day, the way of wearing the ushanka—up flaps, down flaps or ski-style—is considered a part of uniform of the day and is usually decided by a unit commander at reveille.

== Similar hats ==
Trapper hats are "a sort of hybrid between the aviator cap and the ushanka—they combine the style of the former with the furriness of the latter". They are considered more casual than the military-derived ushanka.

The Royal Canadian Mounted Police use muskrat ushankas.

Traditional Finnish "Koivistolainen" flat-topped fur hat, which originates from the Koivisto (kauppala) (now: Primorsk, Leningrad Oblast, Russia) region in the Karelian Isthmus.

== Gallery ==
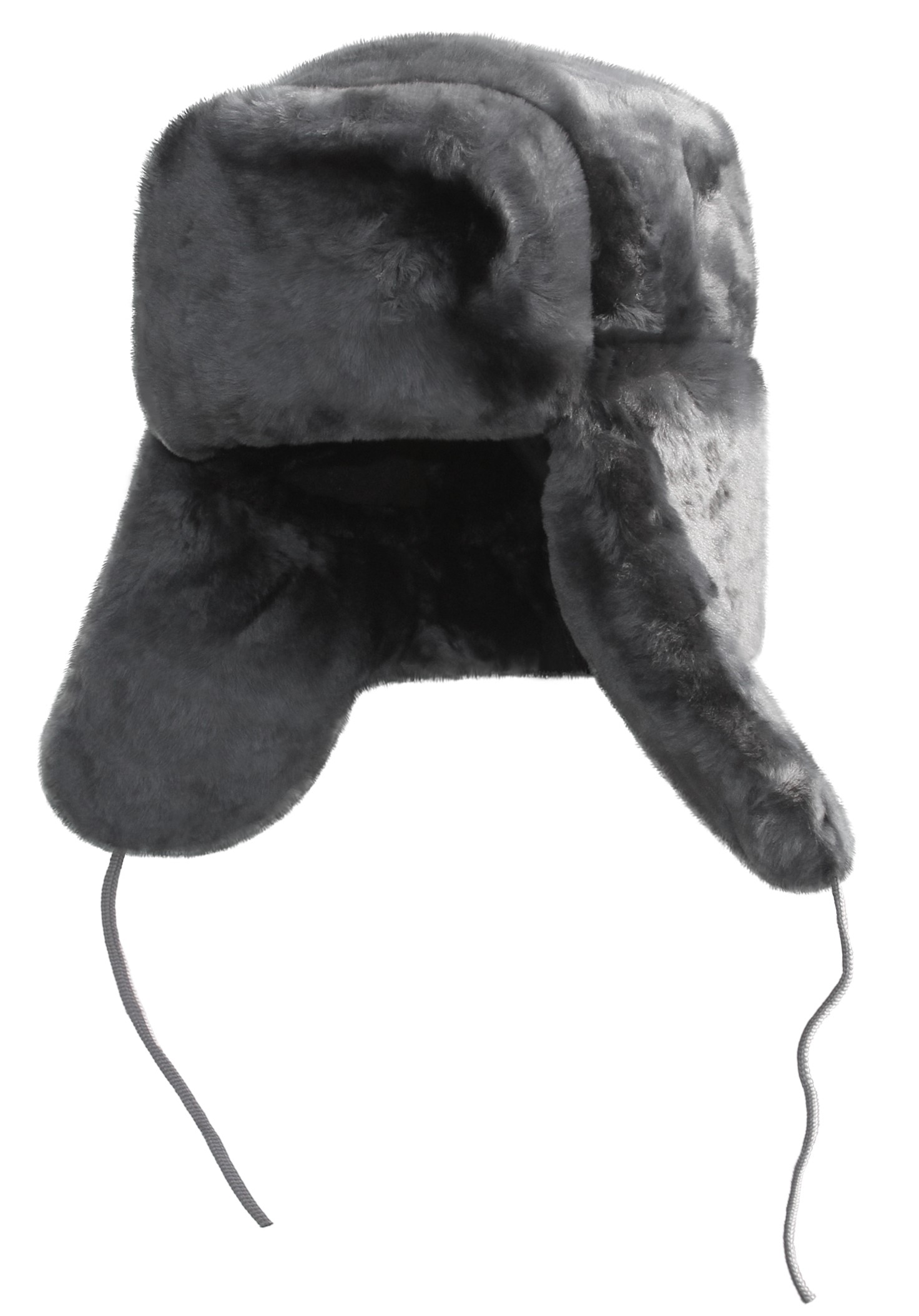
Earflaps down

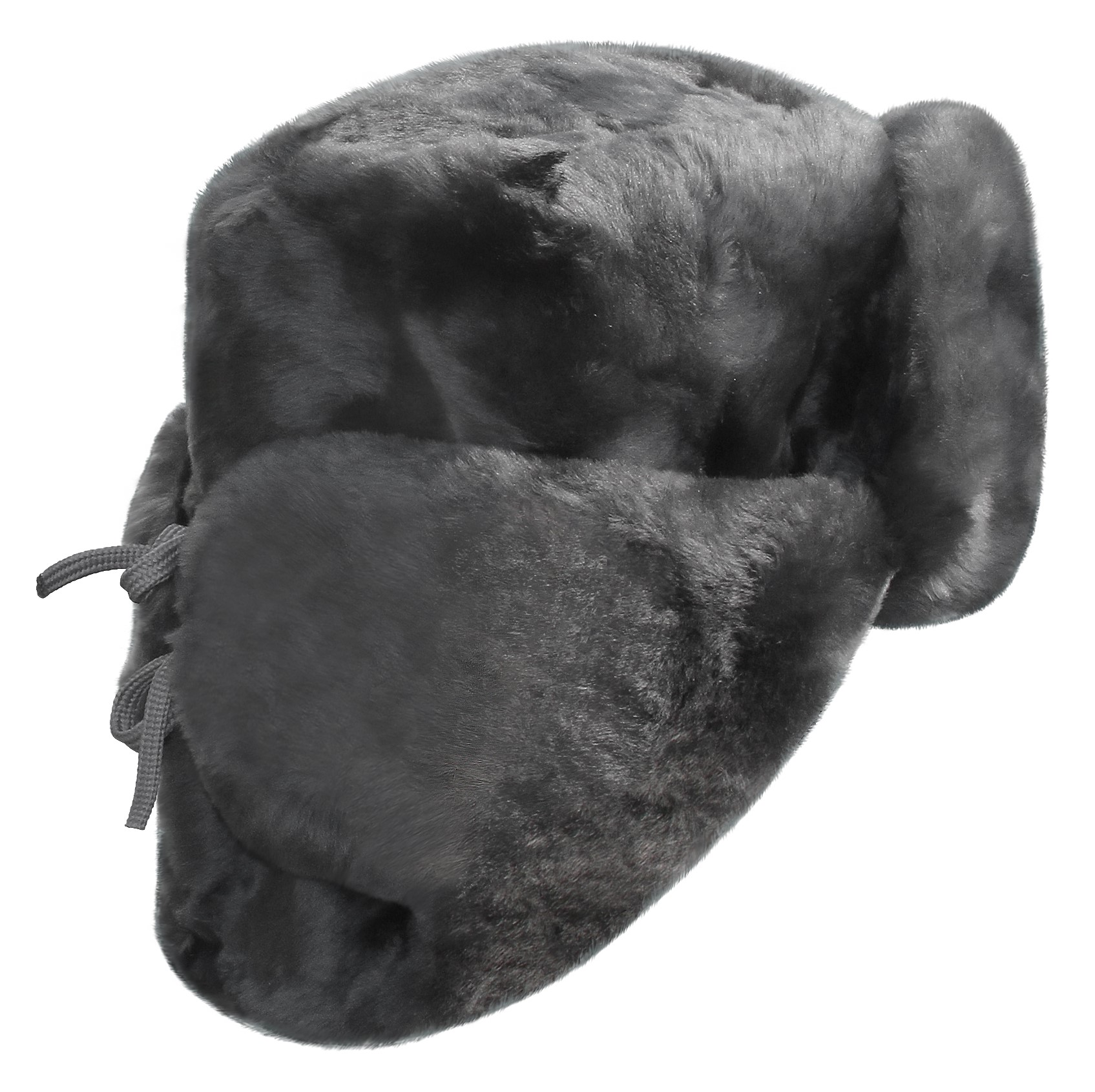
Ushanka hat with earflaps tightened behind: ski-style

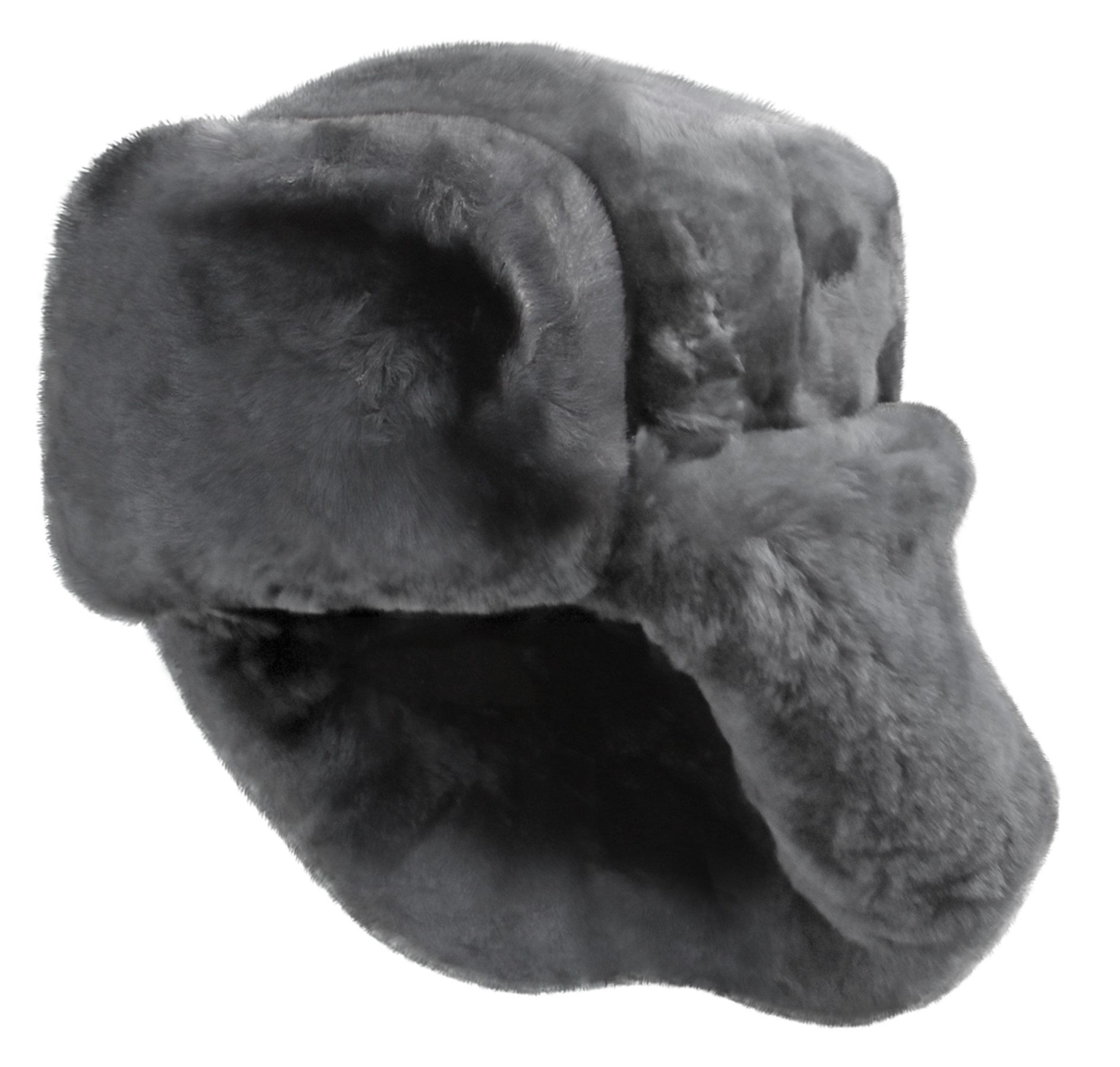
Front look of a hat with earflaps behind

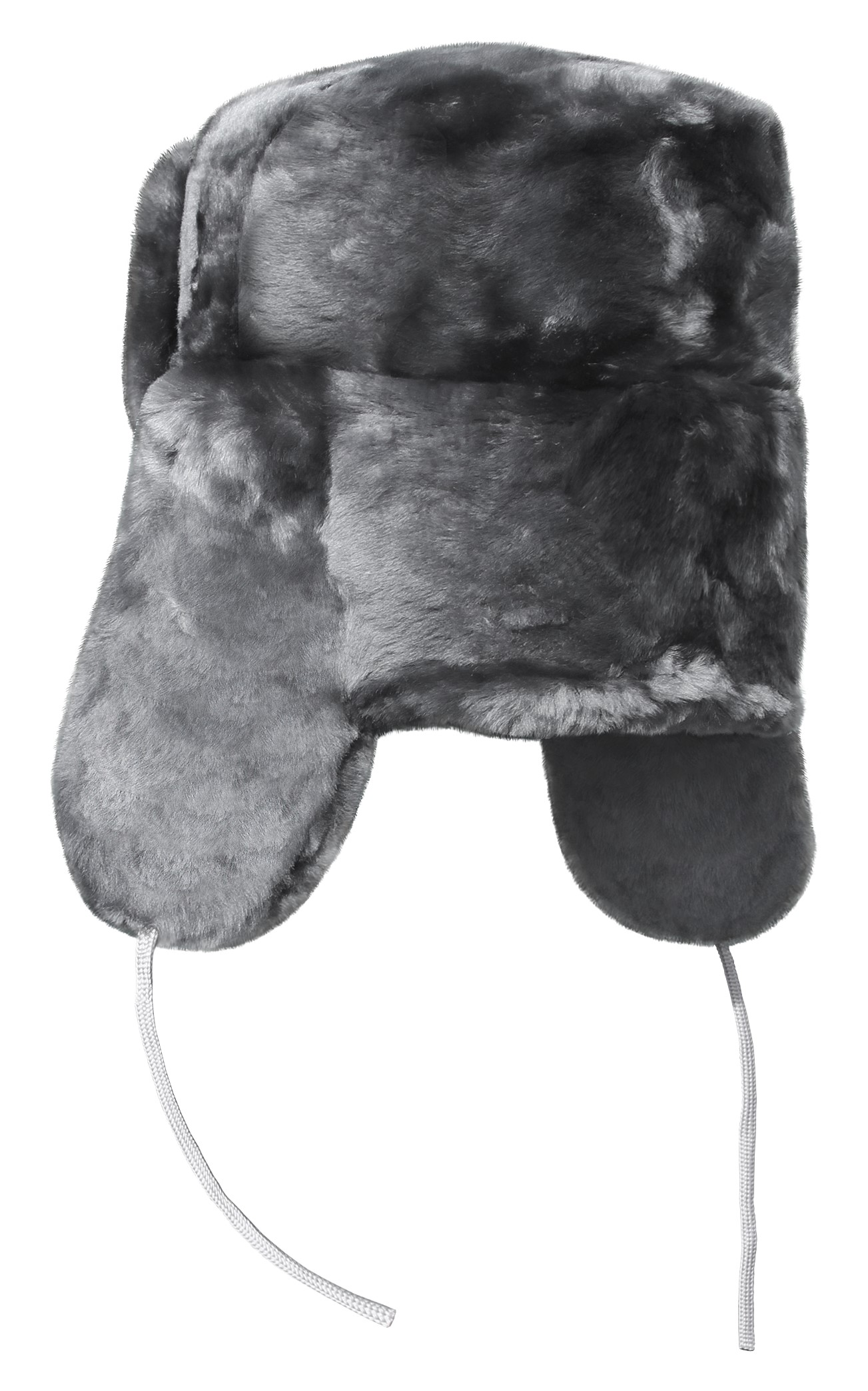
Back of an ushanka hat with earflaps down

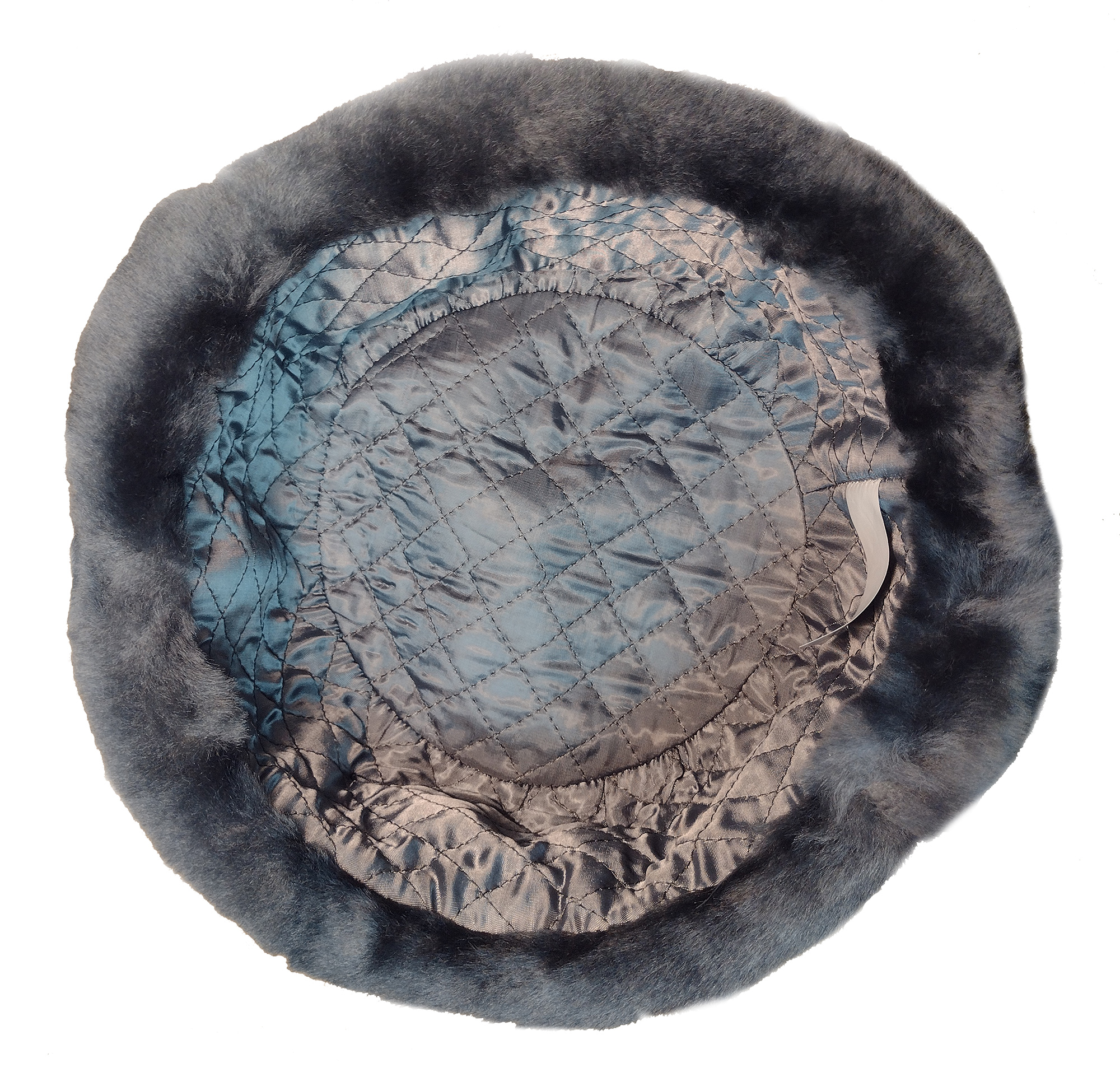
Lining of an ushanka hat

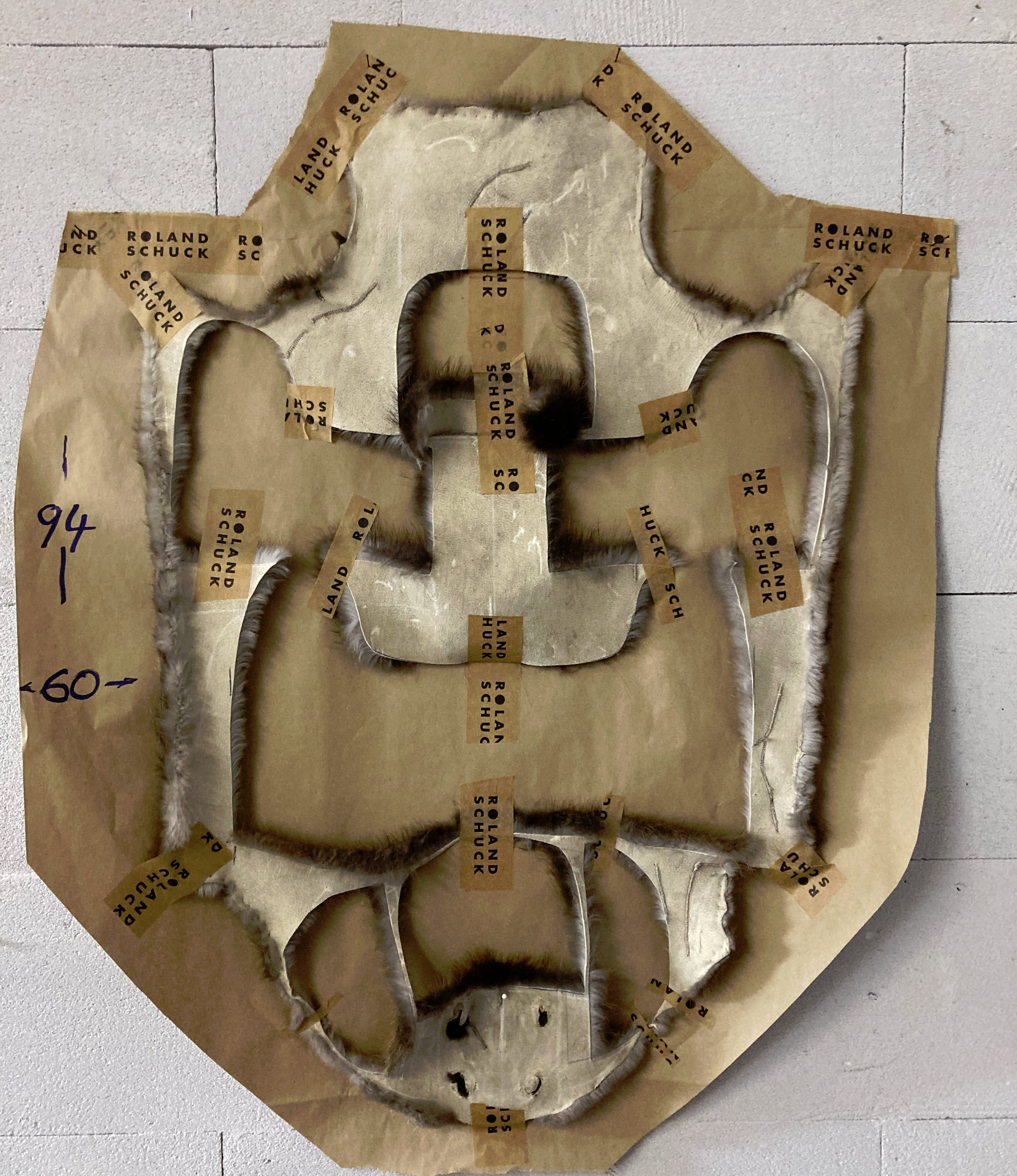
Remains of a beaver fur after an ushanka was cut out

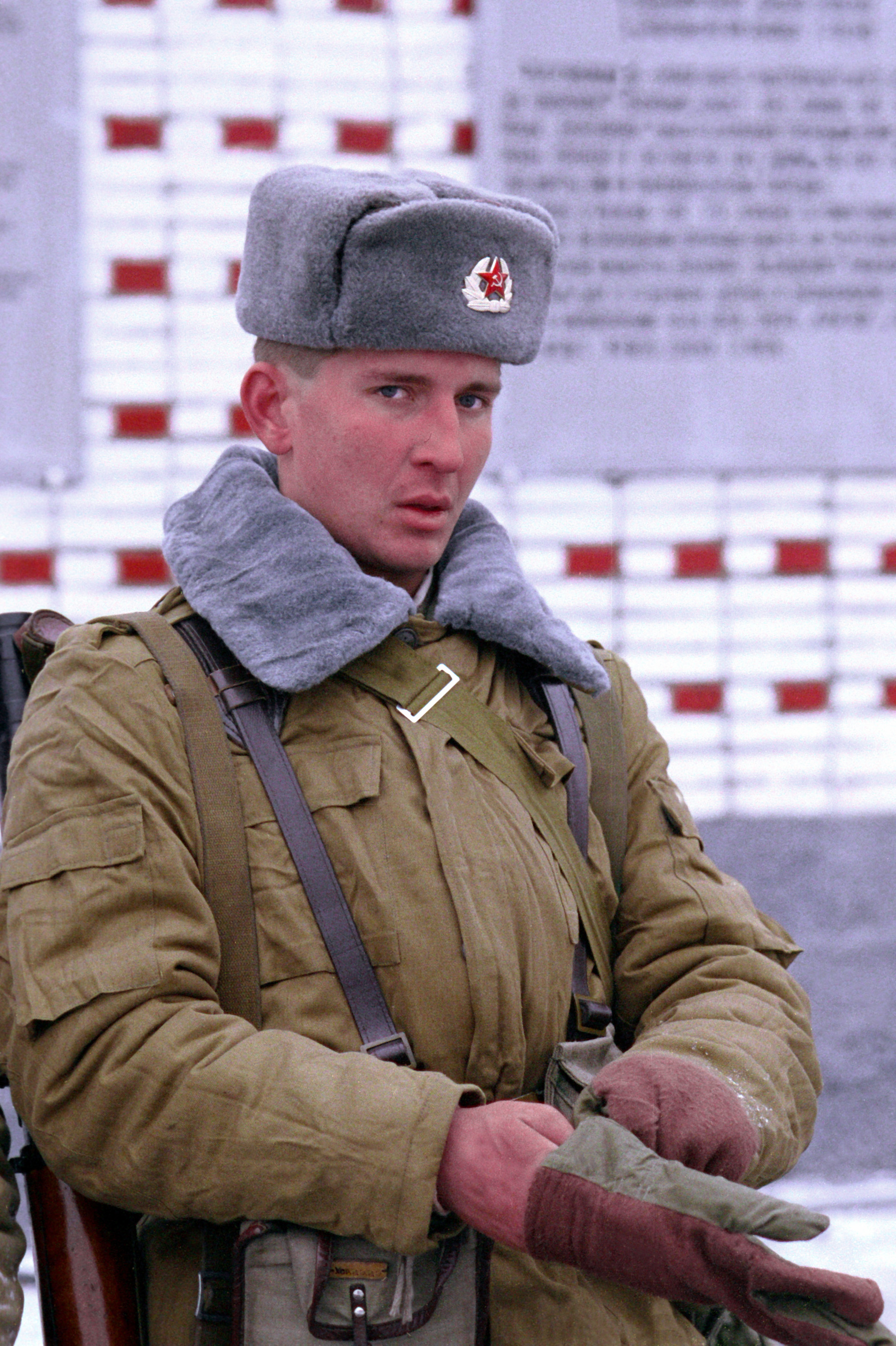
Russian soldier wearing the ushanka with the winter version of the afghanka shortly after the dissolution of the Soviet Union (January 1992); both the afghanka collar and the ushanka are made from "fish fur"

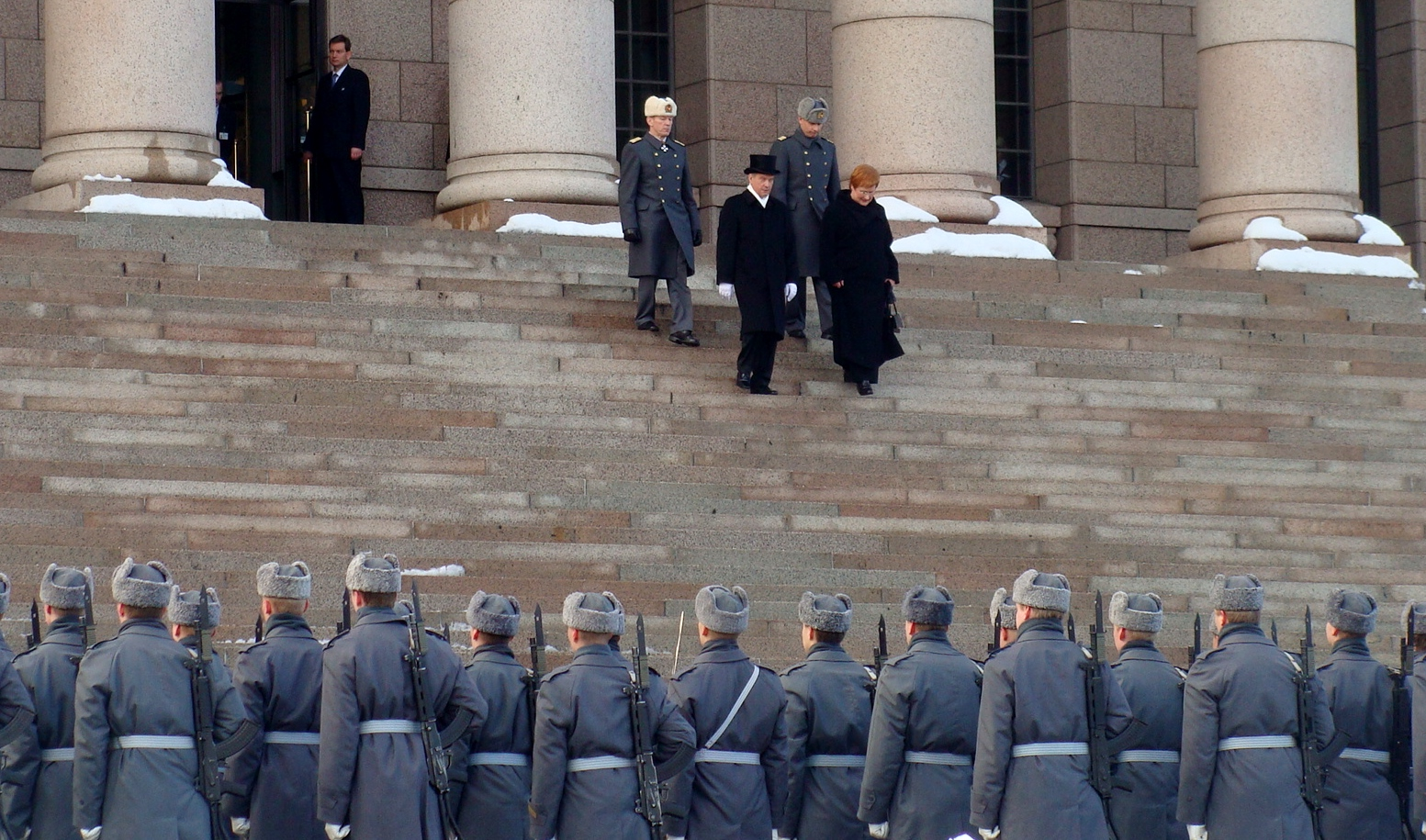
The Presidential change of Finland in 2012

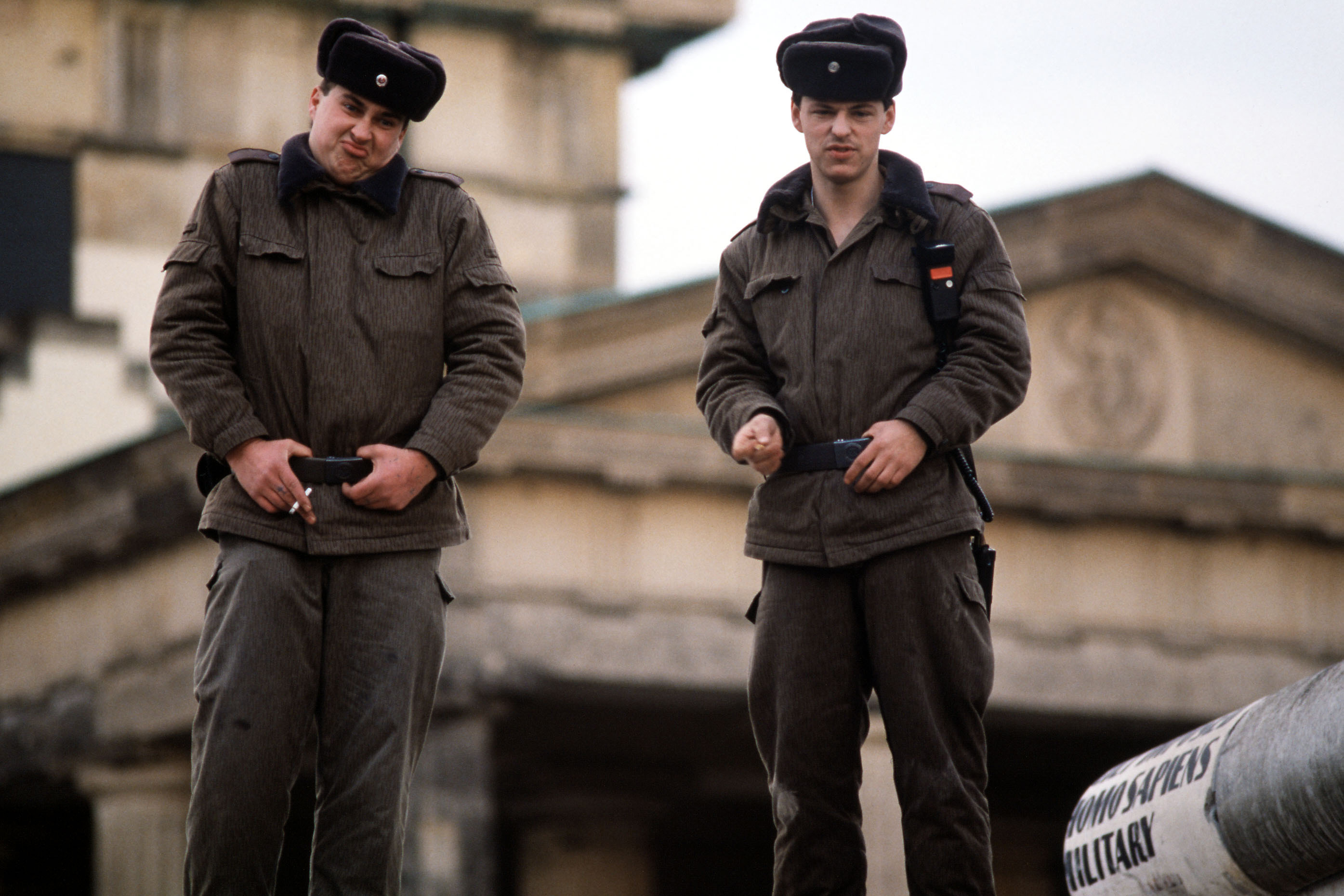
East German border guards stand atop the Berlin Wall

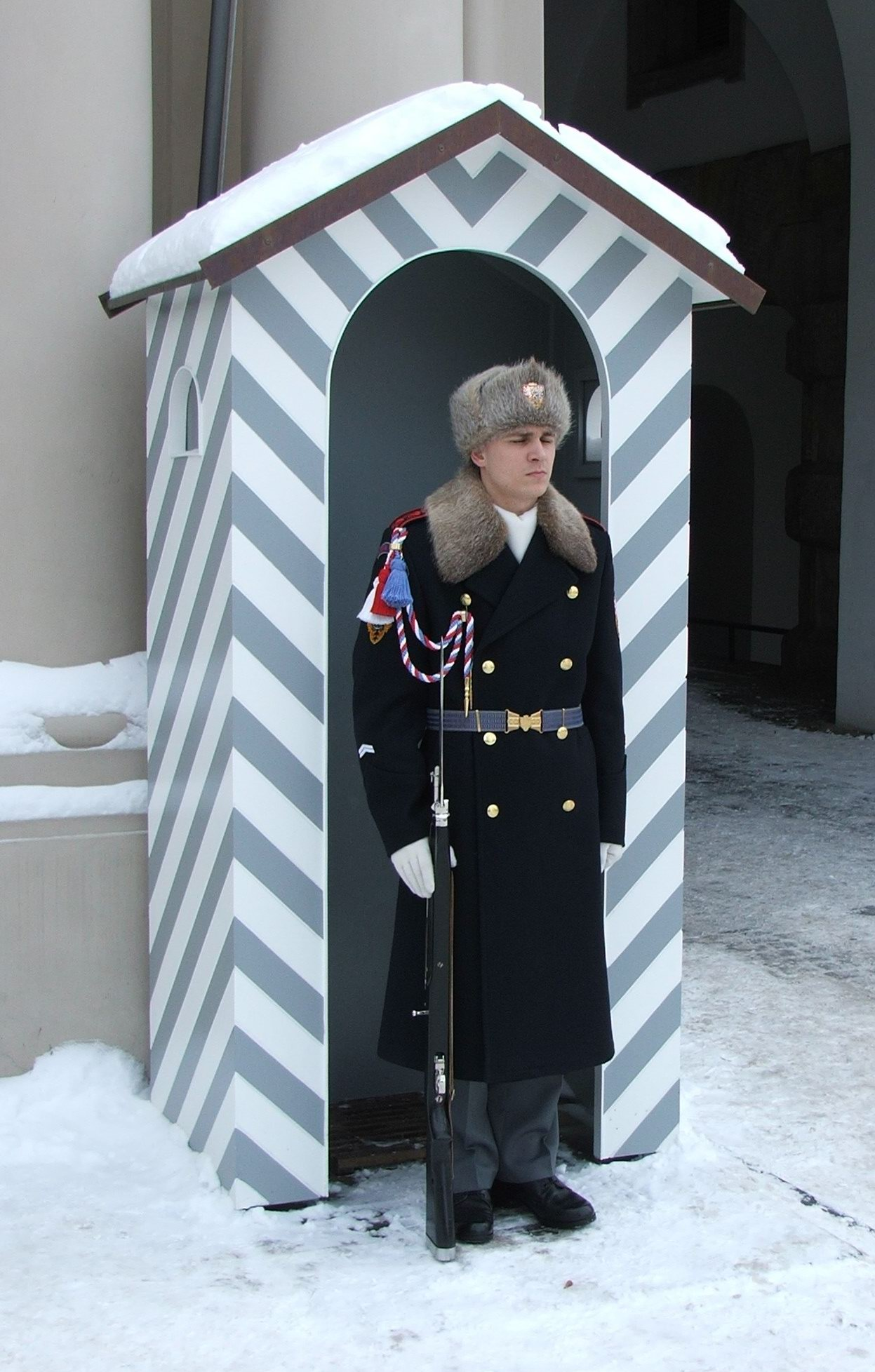
Czech Guard of the Prague castle

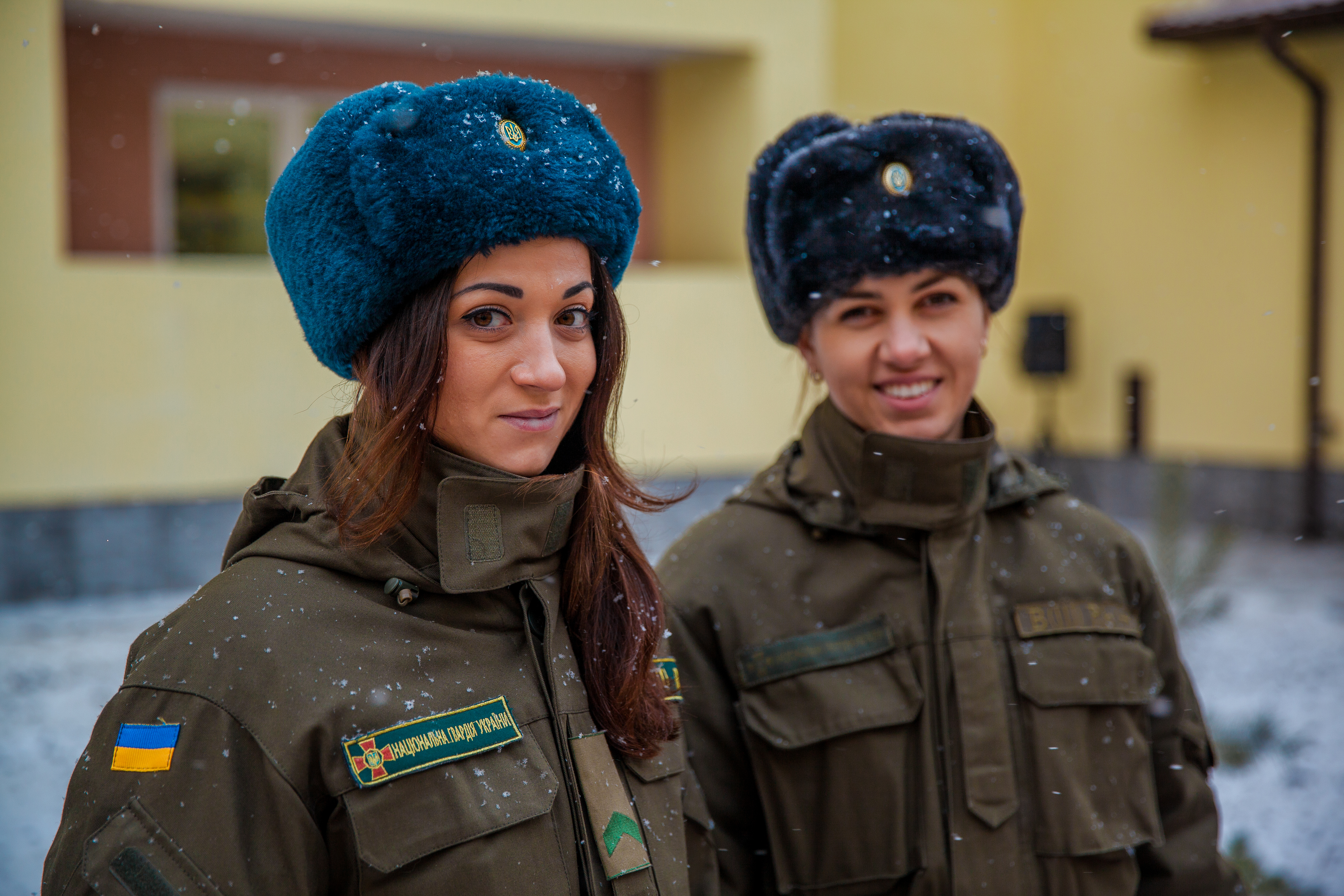
National Guard of Ukraine in 2015

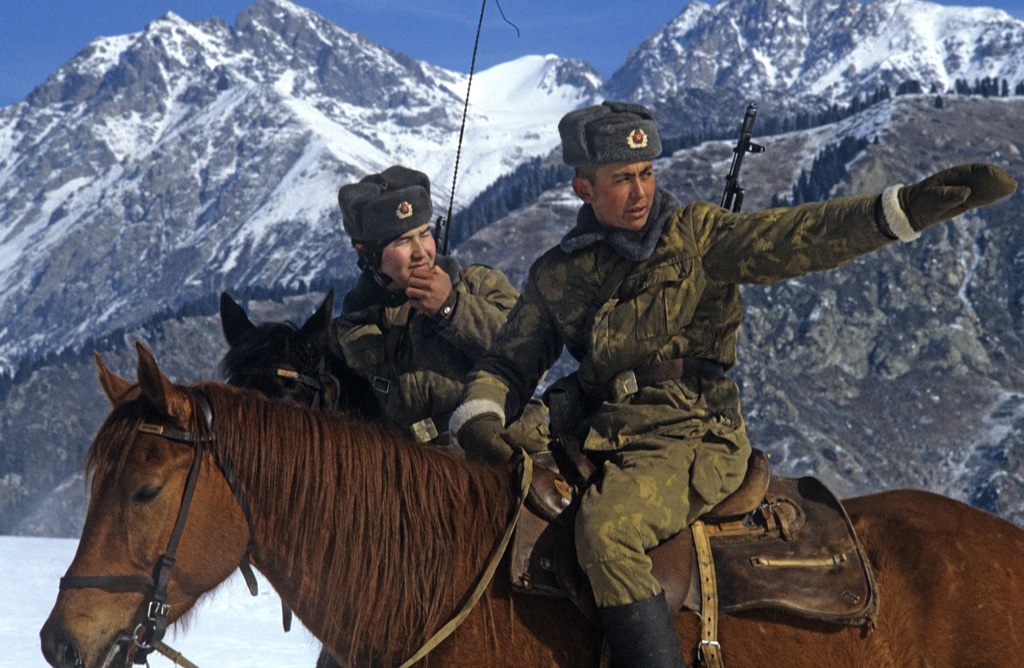
Soviet Border Guards at the Khorgos Soviet-Chinese frontier post

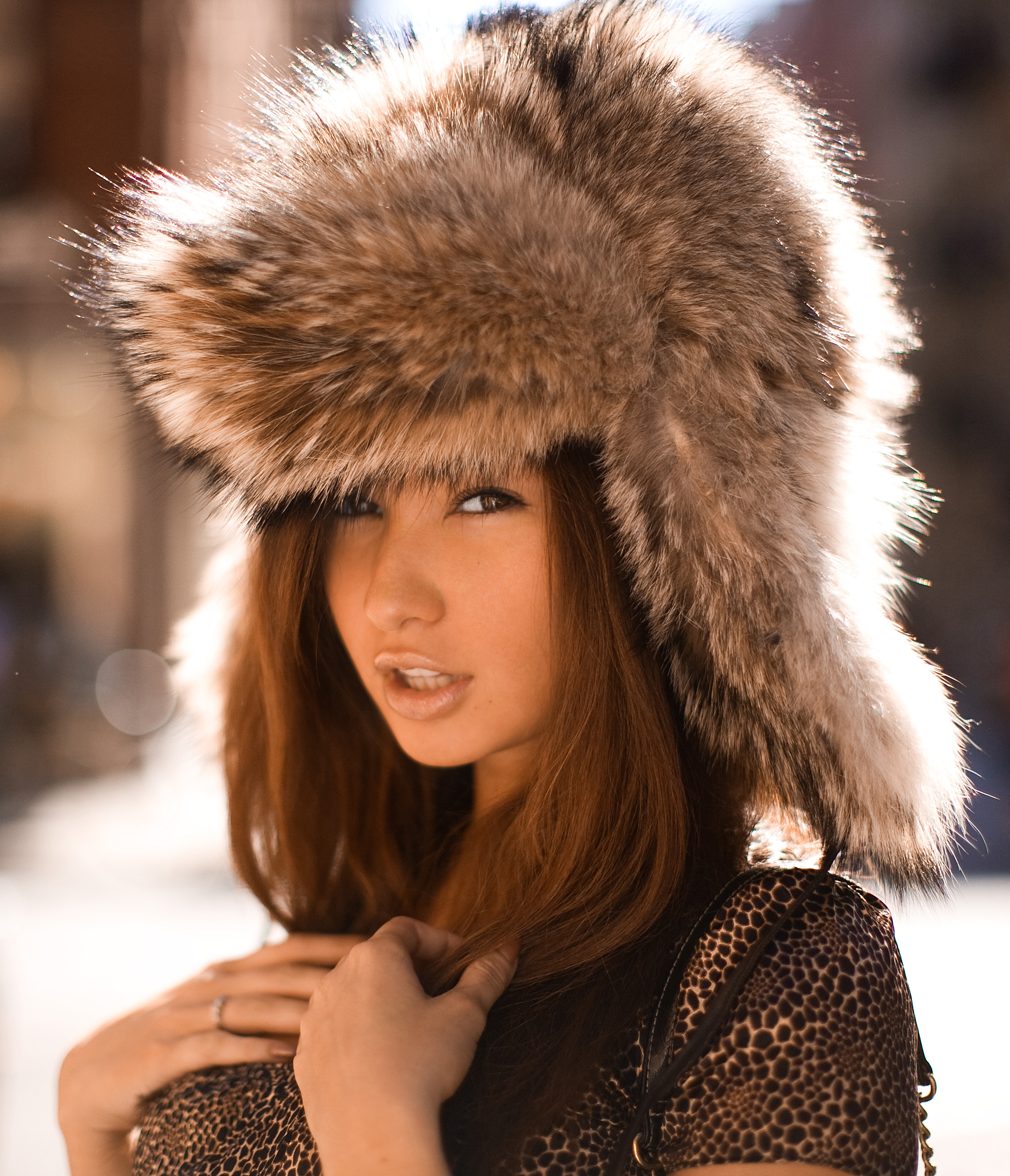
Ushanka made of fur worn as a fashion accessory in 2009

== See also ==
- Aviator hat
- Bearskin
- Canadian military fur wedge cap, styled as an ushanka, used in winter by the Royal Canadian Mounted Police and made from muskrat
- Chullo, an Andean hat with earflaps
- Deerstalker, a double-brimmed cap with earflaps
- List of fur headgear
- List of hat styles
- Malahai and tumaq, a similar Central Asian headgear
- Papakha, a Caucasian fur hat without ear flaps
- Telogreika
- Valenki
