= Fur wedge cap =

Uniform hat worn by the Canadian military and mounted police

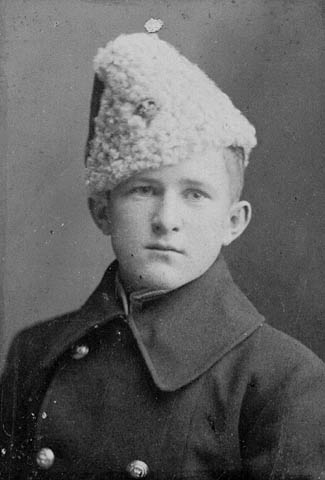
Billy Bishop wearing the fur wedge cap or "The Astrakhan" as a cadet, c. 1914

The Canadian military fur wedge cap, "envelope busby", or colloquially "The Astrakhan" is a uniform hat worn by the Canadian military and RCMP. The outside of the cap is entirely covered in real (e.g. seal skin or Persian lamb) or synthetic fur and is shaped like a wedge. When not being worn the cap folds flat. The cap is about 8 inches (200 mm) high but is normally worn with the apex of the wedge shape depressed back into the interior of the cap to form a longitudinal trough at the crown, reducing the overall height. Often the cap is patterned such that the front of the crown will be slightly higher than the back. On one side of the military style fur wedge cap hangs a flat flap made of muskrat fur or cloth or wool that extends from the crown to the bottom of the cap, known as the "bag". The colour of the "bag" was determined by the regimental colours (e.g. the RCMP bag is yellow). The bag is very similar to that worn with the busby. Because of the cap's passing resemblance to the hussar busby, author and researcher James J. Boulton dubbed it the envelope busby. Still, whatever influence the busby may have had on its design, and despite its very close resemblance to traditional Russian military and civilian styles, the fur wedge cap pattern has been claimed to be "distinctly Canadian."

The fur wedge cap was used by both the North-West Mounted Police (NWMP), later Royal Canadian Mounted Police (RCMP), with the first examples coming into service in 1876 until 1901 and then again from 1928 until 1935. Today the RCMP wear the Yukon pattern of fur cap that is similar to the Russian ushanka style and made from muskrat fur. The other police unit that still regularly wears the fur wedge cap is the Toronto Police Mounted Unit as part of their full dress uniform. The Canadian military also wore the cap from about the end of the 19th century, and was formally adopted in the 1970s as the issued fur cap for all commands of the Canadian Forces during unification. The bag was coloured rifle green. In Canadian Forces nomenclature it is known as Cap, Man's Winter, Fur, C.F. Exactly when the fur cap stopped being in general issue is unclear; however, it is still being worn today by the officer cadets of the Royal Military College of Canada. As an example William Avery Bishop, Canadian flying ace, can be seen wearing the cap during his days in Royal Military College of Canada.

== In popular culture ==
The fur wedge cap is prominently featured in the Cecil B. DeMille film North West Mounted Police (1940), with the mounted police characters all wearing the cap despite the fact that the movie is set in the summertime.

A civilian version of the cap without the bag was fashionable in Canada during the 1970s.

== See also ==
- List of hat styles
- List of fur headgear
- Aviator hat
- Karakul (hat)
- Wedge cap
