= Busby (military headdress) =

Military fur headdress

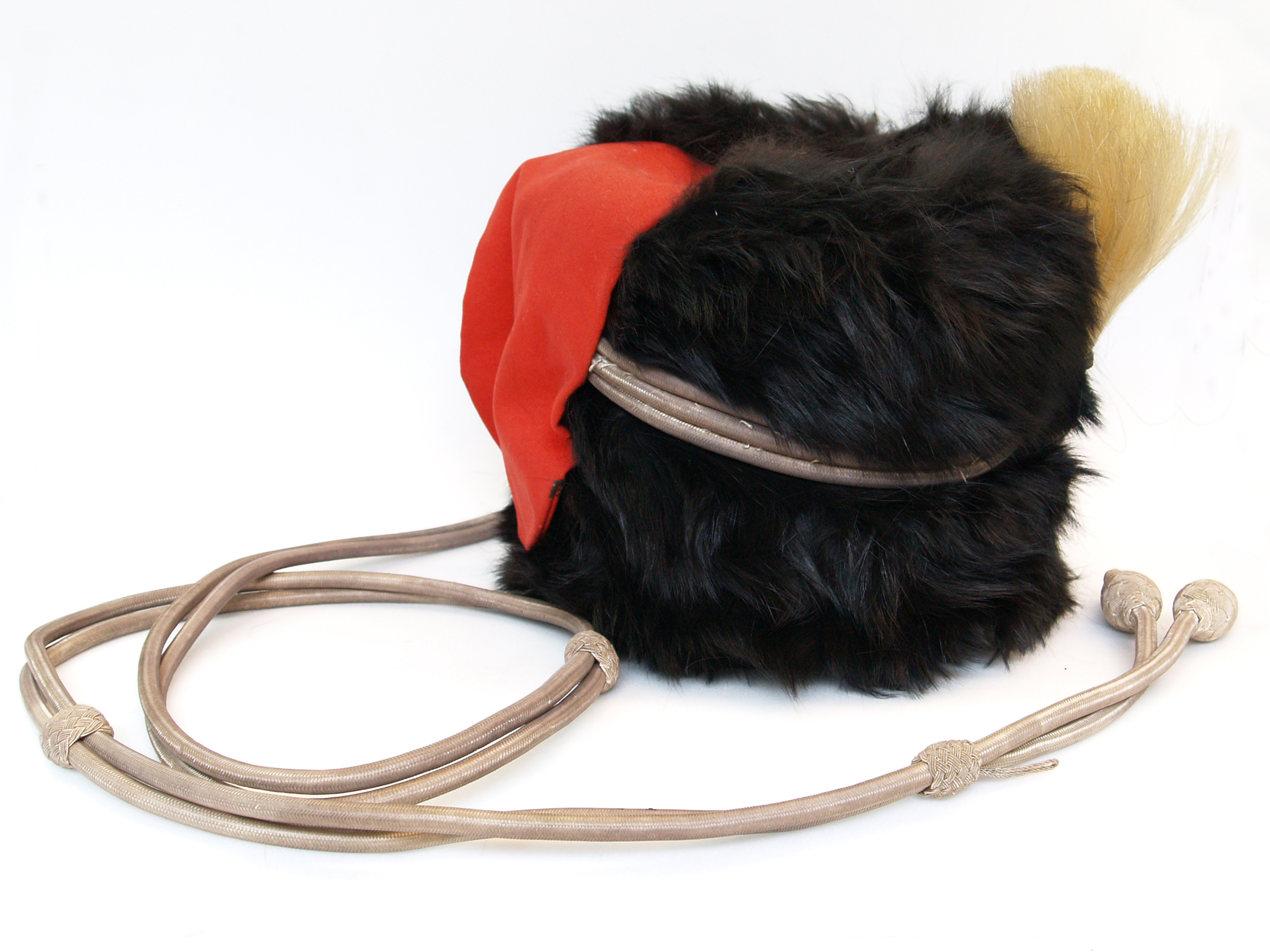
A busby from the 19th century with a plume and red bag. Cap lines attach the cap to the jacket to prevent loss.

Busby is the English name for the Hungarian prémes csákó ('fur shako') or kucsma, a military head-dress made of fur, originally worn by Hungarian hussars. In its original Hungarian form the busby was a cylindrical fur cap, having a bag of coloured cloth hanging from the top. This bag could be filled with sand and the end attached to the right shoulder as a defence against sabre cuts.

== History ==
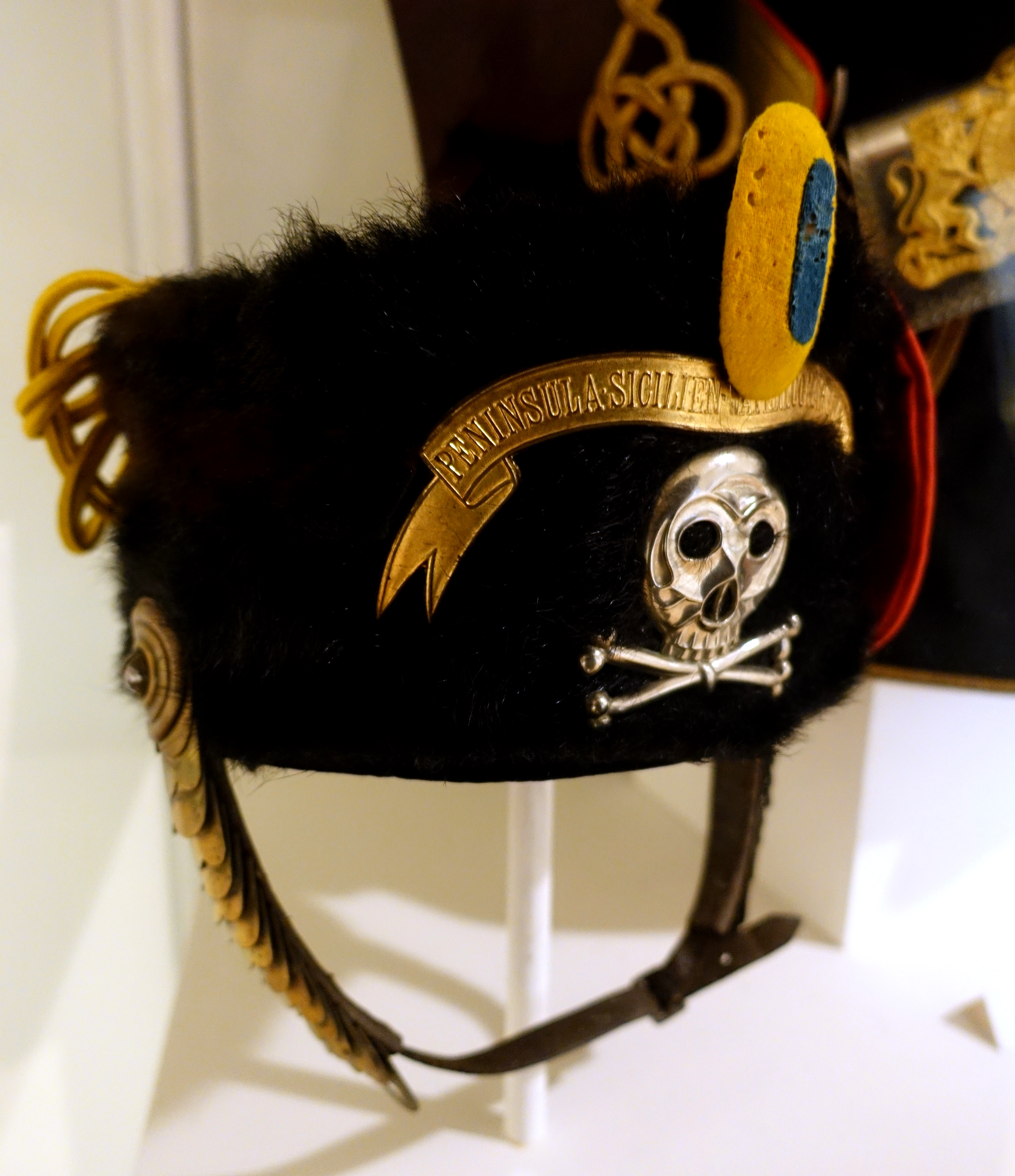
A busby used by a German hussar regiment, c. 1910

The popularity of the military headdress in its hussar form reached a height in the years immediately before World War I (1914–1918). It was widely worn in the Belgian (Guides and field artillery), British (hussars, yeomanry, and horse artillery), Dutch (cavalry and artillery), Italian (light cavalry) German (hussars), Russian (hussars), Serbian (Royal Guard) and Spanish (hussars and mounted cazadores) armies. Several armies have continued to use the headdress as a part of their full dress uniforms.

There were some variations in the materials of which cavalry busbies were made. Russian Cossacks of the Imperial Guard used black sheepskin, Guard Hussars dark brown long-haired fur, and line Hussars black lambswool. All but one of the twenty Prussian Hussar regiments wore sealskin busbies dyed in black, while their officers favoured dark brown otter-skin. The Brunswick Hussar Regiment No. 17 had the distinction of being issued busbies made of bearskin.

With the general conversion of British Light Dragoon regiments to hussars during the 19th century the cloth busby bag with its braided edgings became a useful means of regimental distinction. By 1900 busby bags of red, crimson, blue, white and French grey were being worn by different regiments.

Officers of the Royal Air Force were authorised to wear a distinctive form of busby as an optional part of their ceremonial uniforms from 1920 to 1939. This headdress was reintroduced only for the RAF Band in 1976 before being finally withdrawn in 2011.

== Etymology ==
Possibly the name's original sense of a "busby wig" came from association with Richard Busby, headmaster of Westminster School in the late seventeenth century; the phrase buzz wig may have supplied the derivation for busby. An alternative explanation is that the British hussar cap of the early 19th century was named after the hatter who supplied the officer's version—W. Busby of the Strand London.

== Modern use by country ==
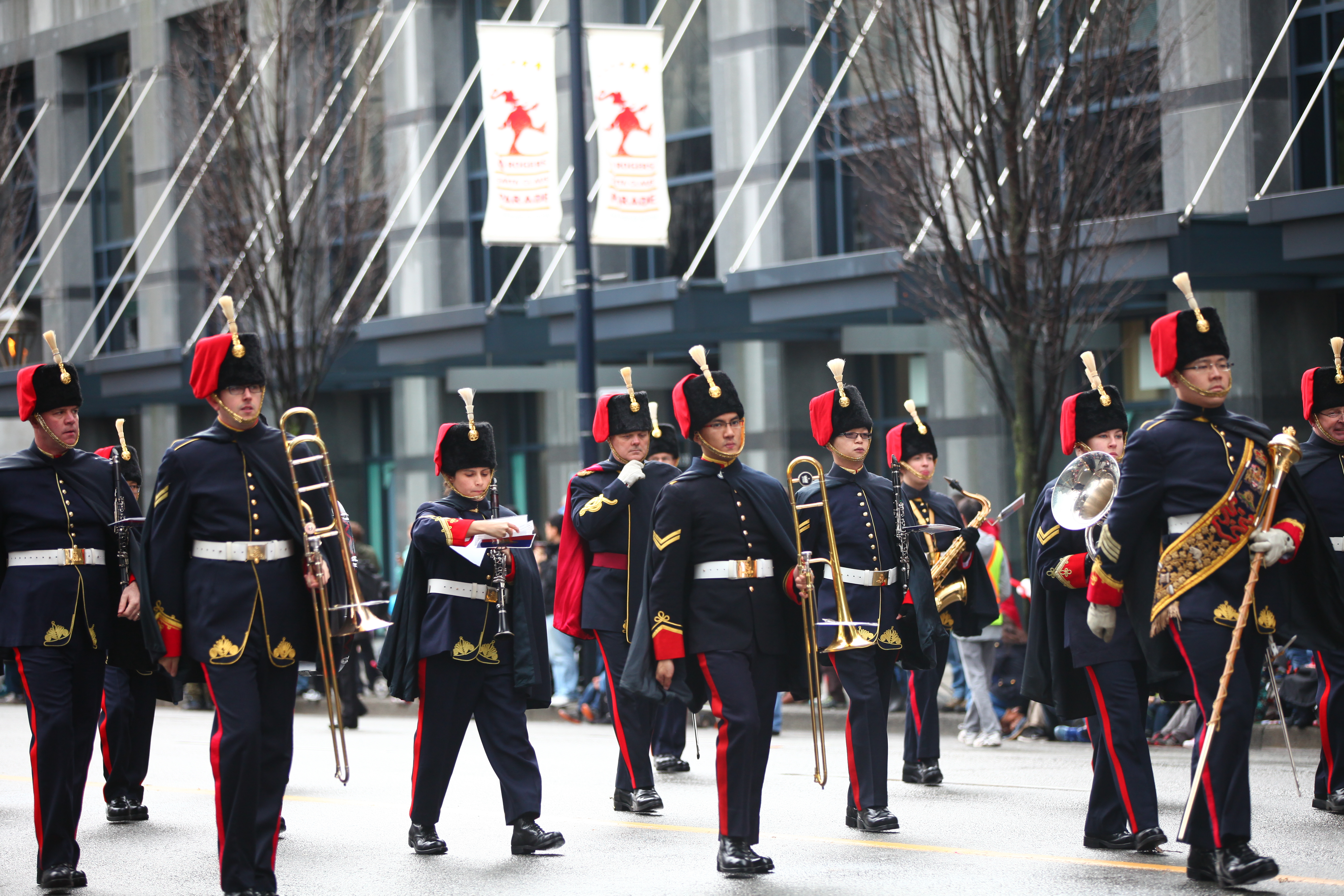
Members of the Royal Canadian Artillery Band

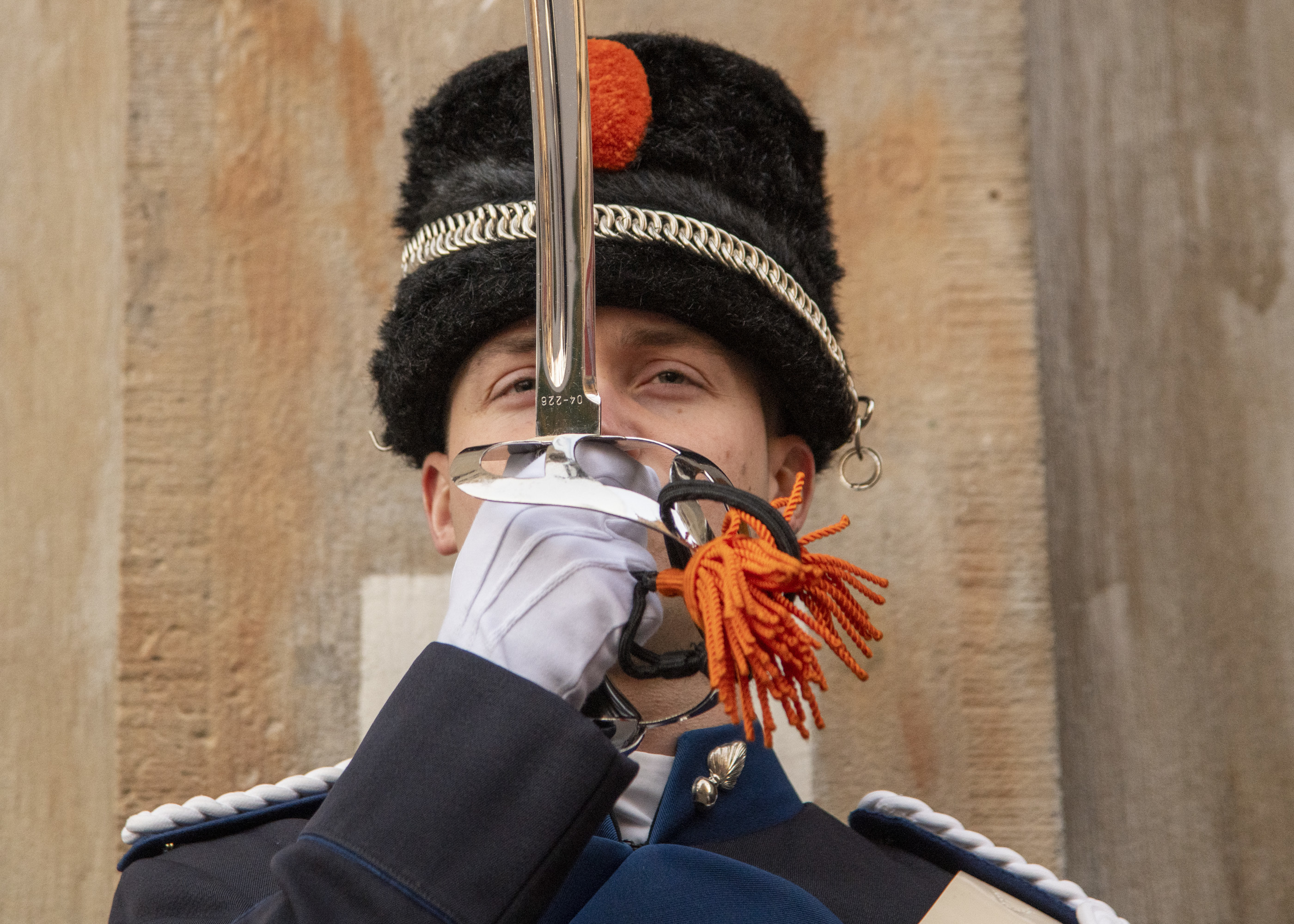
Member of the Dutch Royal Marechaussee

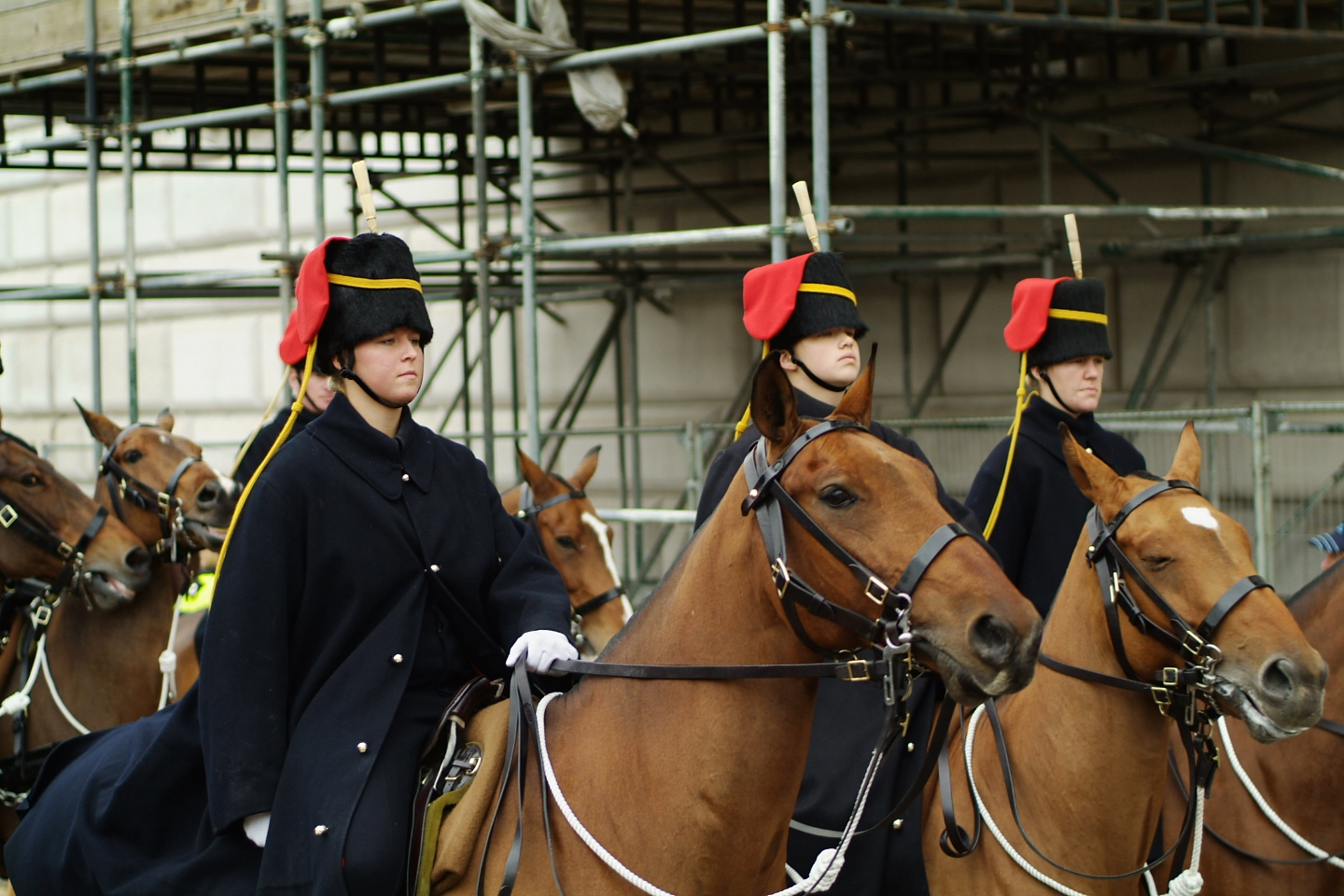
Members of the Royal Horse Artillery

Several police and military units still wear busbies as a part of their ceremonial dress.

=== Canada ===
The Canadian Forces dress instructions authorise the busby as a part of the full dress uniform for hussars, artillery and rifle regiments.

=== Netherlands ===
The historic busby is still worn by ceremonial detachments of the Dutch Hussars and Royal Gendarmerie (Koninklijke Marechaussee) in full dress uniform.

=== United Kingdom ===
In the United Kingdom busbies are of two kinds: (a) the hussar busby, cylindrical in shape, with a bag and cap lines (cords to connect the cap to the tunic); this is worn by hussars and the Royal Horse Artillery; (b) the rifle busby, a folding cap of astrakhan (curly lambswool) formerly worn by rifle regiments, in shape somewhat resembling a Glengarry but taller. Both have straight plumes in the front of the headdress. The headdress is worn with full dress by the Waterloo Band of the Rifles, the Royal Horse Artillery and ceremonial detachments at regimental expense. In its hussar version it is now made of black nylon fur, although Bandmasters still retain the original animal fur. The busby should not be mistaken for the much taller bearskin cap, worn most notably by the five regiments of Foot Guards of the Household Division (Grenadier, Coldstream, Scots, Irish and Welsh Guards). Around 1900 the word "busby" was used colloquially to denote the tall bear and racoonskin "caps" worn by foot guards and fusiliers and the feather bonnets of Highland infantry. This usage is now obsolete.

== See also ==
- List of hat styles
- List of fur headgear
- Canadian military fur wedge cap
- Forage cap
- Mirliton (military)
- Shako
- Sailor cap
- Side cap
