= Fake fur =

Fabric intended to mimic fur

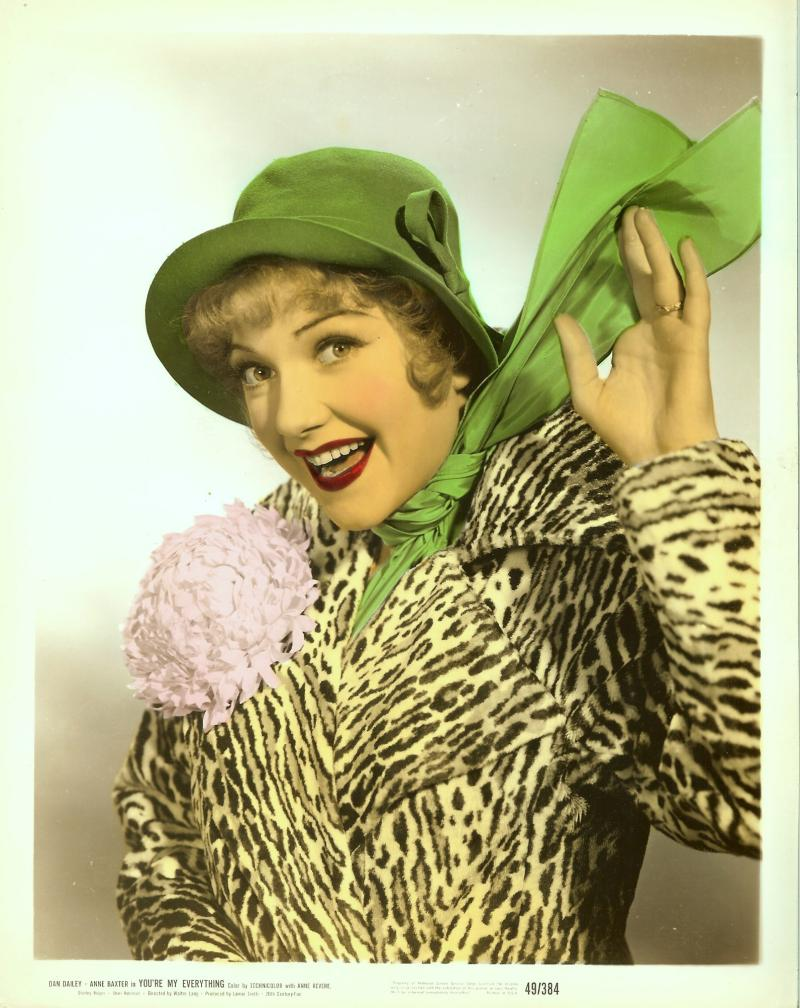
Promotion photo from You're My Everything featuring Anne Baxter wearing a fake fur coat

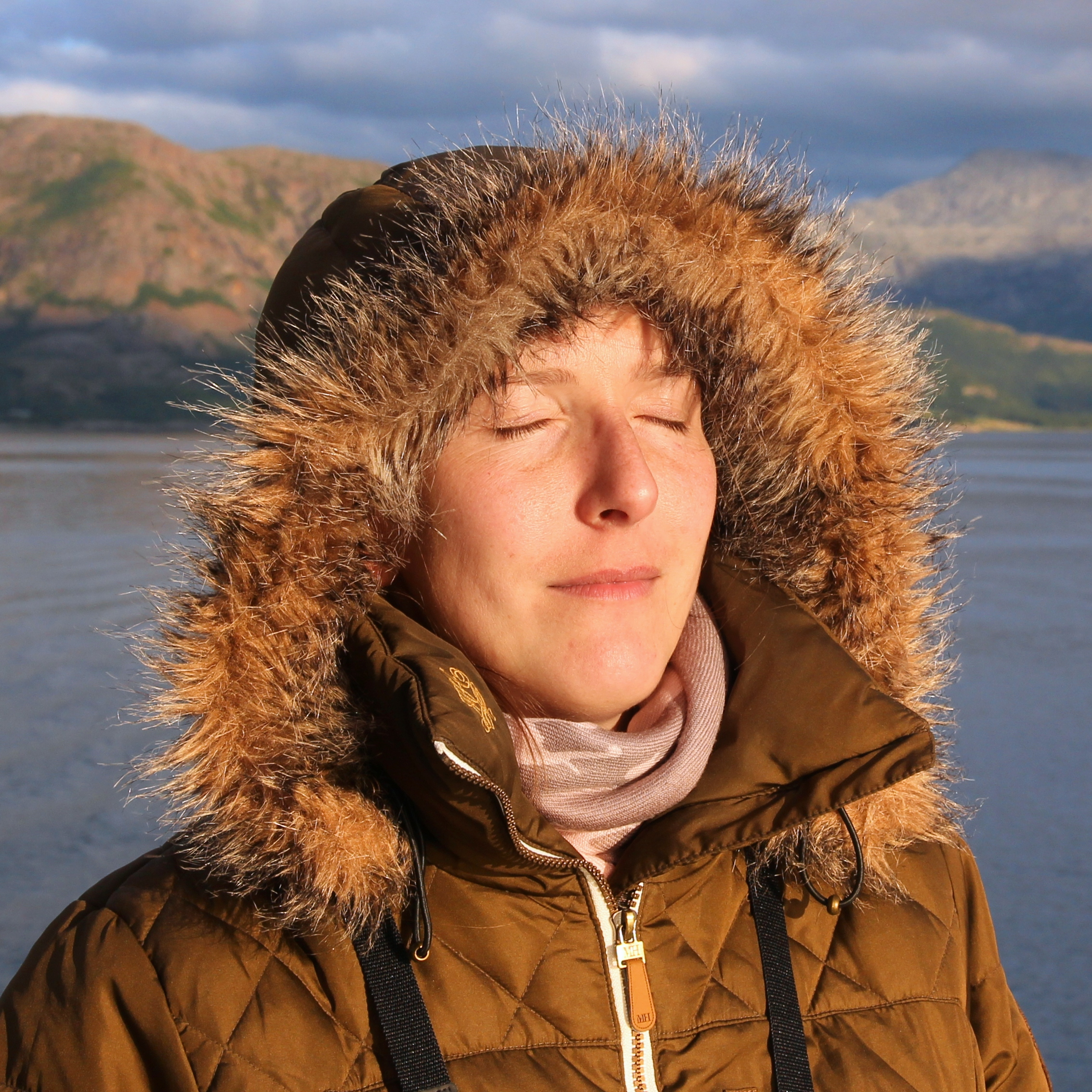
Woman wearing a hood lined with fake fur

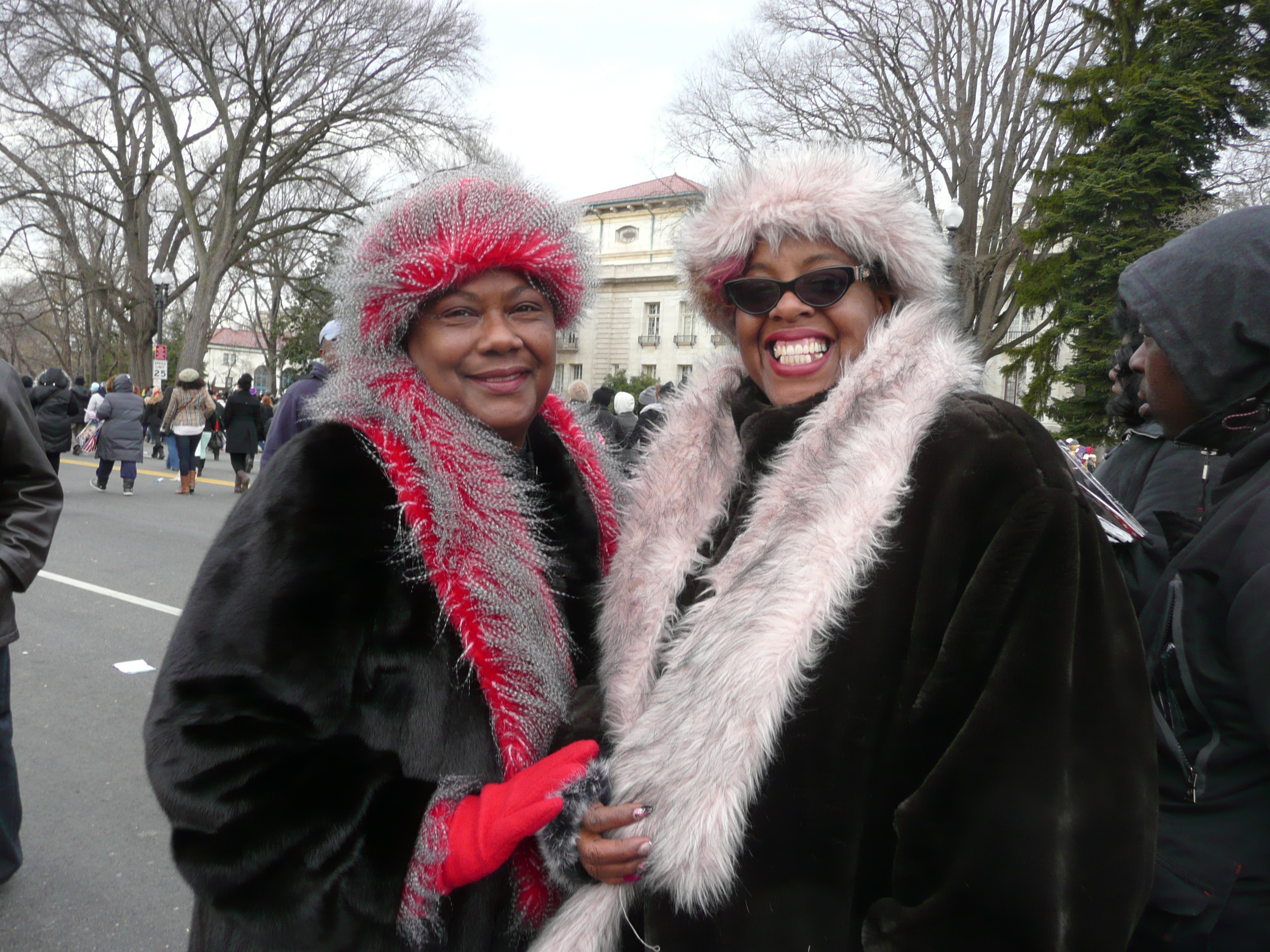
Two women wearing fake furs

Fake fur, also called faux fur, is a pile fabric engineered to have the appearance and warmth of fur. Fake fur can be made from a variety of materials, including polyester, nylon, or acrylic.

First introduced in 1929, fake furs were initially composed of hair from the South American alpaca. The ensuing decades saw substantial improvements in their quality, particularly in the 1940s, thanks to significant advances in textile manufacturing. By the mid-1950s, a transformative development in fake furs occurred when alpaca hair was replaced with acrylic polymers, leading to the creation of the synthetic fur we recognize today.

The promotion of fake furs by animal rights and animal welfare organizations has contributed to its increasing popularity as an animal-friendly alternative to traditional fur clothing.

== Uses ==
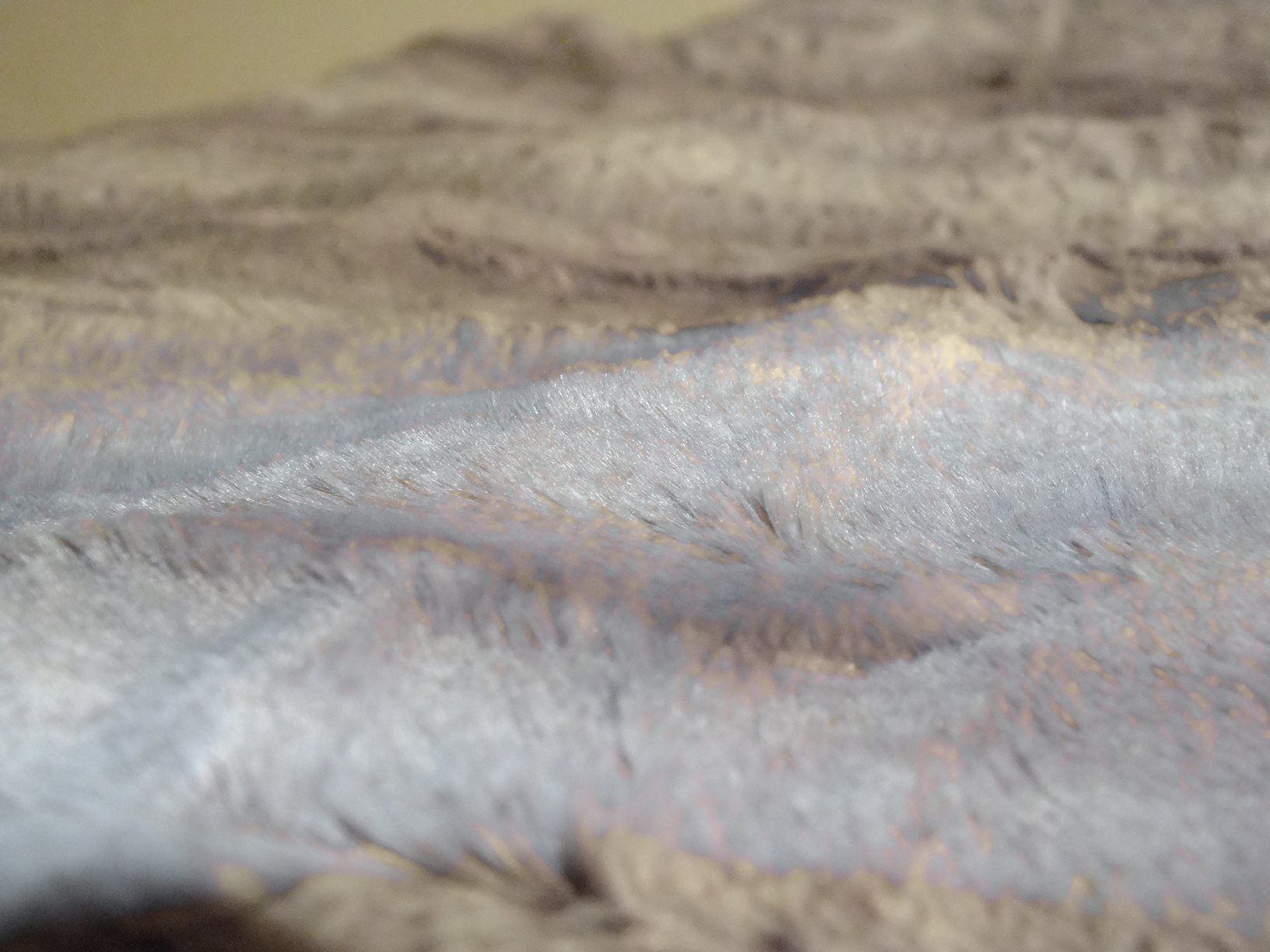
A fake fur blanket

Fake fur is used in all applications where real fur would be used, including but not limited to stuffed animals, fashion accessories, pillows, bedding and throws. It is also used for craft projects because it can be sewn on a standard sewing machine. In contrast, real fur is generally thicker and requires hand sewing or an awl. Fake fur is increasingly used in mainstream teen fashion; the stores Abercrombie & Fitch and American Eagle commonly use fake furs in their trapper hats and jackets. Ralph Lauren has promoted the use of fake fur in its collections.

Fake fur is widely used in making fursuits in the furry community.

In the Soviet, and now Russian Army, fish fur is a derogatory term for low-quality winter clothing and ushanka hats, from a proverb that "a poor man's fur coat is of fish fur".

== Comparison to real fur ==
=== Sewing process and storage ===
Unlike genuine fur, faux fur is a type of fabric, which makes it relatively easy to sew. The synthetic nature of faux fur eliminates the need for cold storage, which prevents deterioration in real fur. In addition, fake fur is not infested by moths, unlike real fur. However, fake fur should be stored in a garment bag or container away from humidity, heat, and sunlight to maintain its quality.

Due to the controversy of fur garments, technology facilitating the production of fake furs has significantly improved since the early twentieth century. There are new tailoring and dyeing techniques to "disguise" fur and change the traditional image of fur with its conventional image associated with the elite fur-clad woman. Modacrylic is a high-quality 'fur' alternative that gains attraction to its convincing look as an alternative to real fur. Howard Strachman of Strachman Associates, a New York-based agent for faux fur, states that synthetic acrylic knitted fabrics have become a go-to resource for high-end faux fur, much of it coming from Asia. New methods of production are still being developed. One technique combines coarse and fine fibers to simulate mink or beaver fur.

=== Durability and energy consumption ===
Faux fur is perceived as less durable than real fur, and this attribute coupled with its lesser insulating properties forms part of the critique against its use. Also, unlike real fur, fake furs are not able to keep snow from melting and re-freezing on the fiber filaments, which can be dangerous in extremely cold environments.

Fake fur production could consume less energy compared to real fur. A study conducted in 1979 claimed that the energy consumption for the production of one coat made out of fake fur was 35 kilowatt-hours (120,000 British thermal units), compared to 127 kWh (433,000 Btu) for trapped animals and 2,340 kWh (7,970,000 Btu) for animals raised in fur farms. Despite these findings, the study has faced criticism for perceived bias and dated methodology.

=== Environmental impact ===
Fake fur is less biodegradable due to its composition of various synthetic materials. These materials often include blends of acrylic and modacrylic polymers derived from coal, air, water, petroleum, and limestone, which can potentially take between 500 and 1,000 years to break down. And even when it breaks down, it become smaller pieces that still pollutes the environment.

=== Pricing ===
Fake fur is significantly less expensive than real fur. The price spectrum for luxury fake fur items spans from as low as $127 to as high as $8,900 in the mass market. In contrast, real fur luxury outerwear begins at a significantly higher price point, starting at $2,300.

== Use of actual fur ==
Some coats labeled as having faux-fur trim were found to use actual fur in a test conducted by the Humane Society of the United States. In the United States, up until 2012, a labeling loophole allowed any piece of clothing that contains less than $150 of fur to be labeled without mentioning that it included fur. This is the equivalent of thirty rabbits, three raccoons, three red foxes, two to five leopards, twenty ring tailed lemurs, three domestic dogs, or one bear.The authenticity of faux fur labels cannot be guaranteed.

== Use by fashion designers ==
Fake fur is popular in fashion, and several fashion designers incorporate the material throughout their collections. Hannah Weiland, founder of Shrimps, a London-based fake fur company, says, "I love working with faux fur because it doesn't molt and it feels just as soft. If the faux kind feels as good, why use the real kind?" Designer Stella McCartney also incorporates faux fur throughout her collections with tagged patches reading "Fur Free Fur."

German company Hugo Boss made a public stance against animal fur by pledging to go completely fur-free, taking effect with their 2016 Fall/Winter collection. With the announcement, creative director of sportswear Bernd Keller stated the company's intention to prioritize animal protection and sustainability over convenience.

SpiritHoods is a Los Angeles based apparel company and specializes in faux fur coats. PETA (People for Ethical Treatment of Animals) awarded them the Libby Award in 2011, 2012 and 2022 for being a cruelty-free clothing brand.

Fake fur is also used for its versatility in color and shape. Julie de Libran, the former artistic director of Sonia Rykiel, incorporated a combination of both real and fake fur in her collections. De Libran stated that she utilized fake fur for its ability to take on creative colors and forms, giving it a playfulness that natural fur alone could not create.

Prada embraced synthetics in their Fall/Winter 2007 collection. Miuccia Prada, the brand's owner and designer, commented that she was bored with real fur, and as a result, she included fake fur in her collection that year. In addition, Dries Van Noten, Hussein Chalayan, Julien David, Julie de Libran for Sonia Rykiel, Kate Spade, and many others featured fake fur in their fall collections. In addition, Prada, Max Mara and Dries Van Noten have included mohair faux fur in their collections.

The global artificial fur industry is projected to grow at a rate of over 15% by 2027.
