= Fish fur =

Russian-language ironic expression

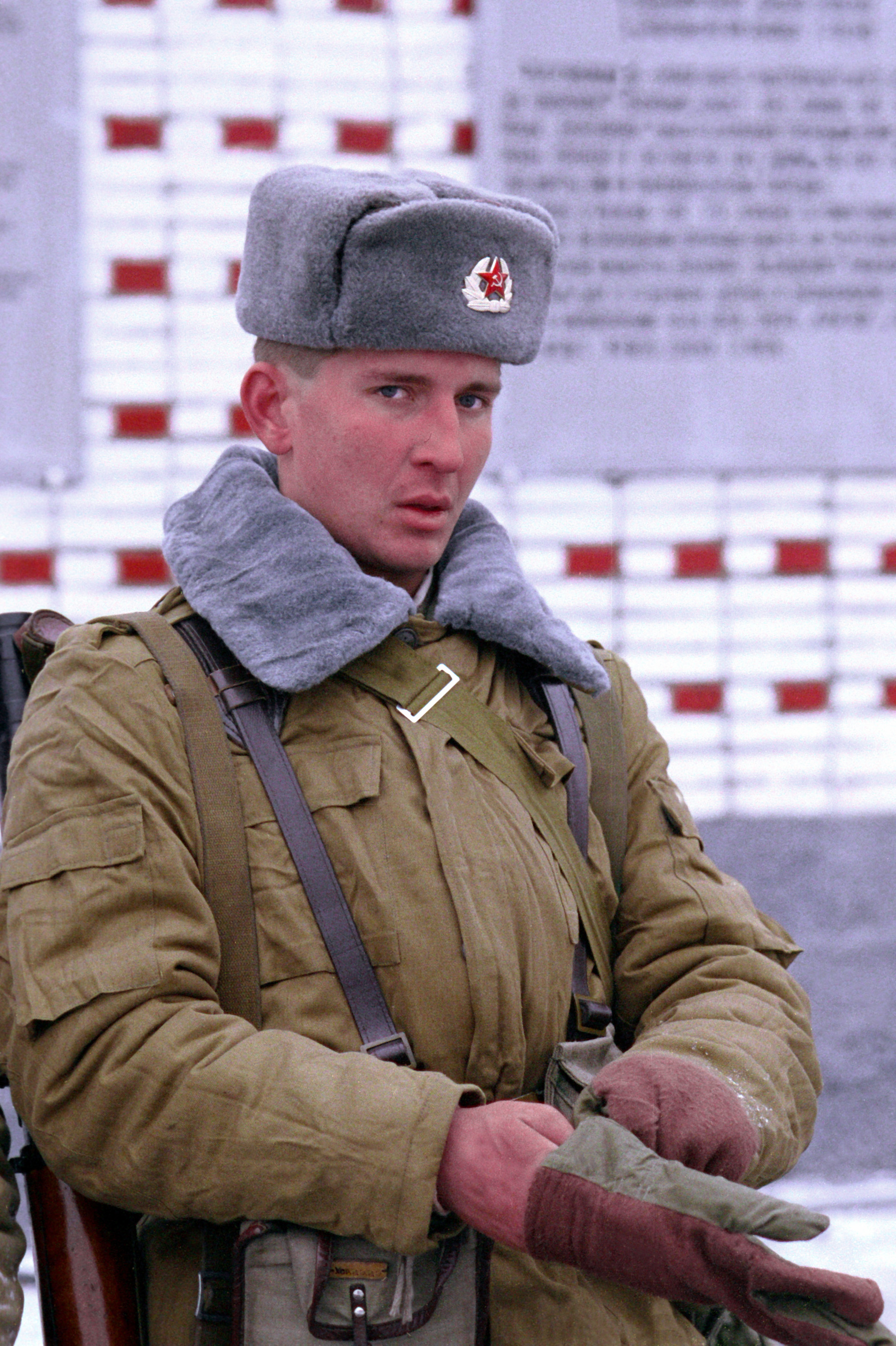
Russian soldier wearing the winter Afghanka uniform and ushanka (January 1992). Both the Afghanka collar and ushanka are made from fish fur.

Fish fur (Russian: рыбий мех, romanized: ryby mekh) is a Russian-language ironic expression used to describe poor quality of coats and other clothes worn for warmth. In modern times, it is also used for fake fur, especially of poor quality. The term traces back to a Russian proverb "A poor man's fur coat is of fish fur." (Russian: У бедняка шуба на рыбьем меху, romanized: U bednyaka shuba na rybyem mekhu.)

The expression has often been used to describe the uniform of the Soviet Army. In particular, elements of winter uniform (ushanka, collars, mittens) of ordinary soldiers and lower ranks were made of wool pile, which has been a popular cheap material for civilian clothing as well.

Aleksandr Solzhenitsyn in his Gulag Archipelago records the expression "Stalin's fur" in the meaning of no fur of any kind, in reference to the dress of Gulag inmates, supposedly derived in an analogy with "fish fur".

== See also ==
- Fur-bearing trout
