= Paul Weiland =

British director (born 1953)

Paul Weiland OBE
- Born: 11 July 1953 (age 73); England
- Occupations: Writer, director
- Years active: 1987–present
- Spouse: Caroline Weiland
- Children: 4, including Hannah Weiland

Paul Weiland OBE (born 11 July 1953) is an English film and television director, writer, and producer. Weiland is a director and producer of television commercials in the UK, having made over 500 commercials, including a popular and long-running series for Walkers crisps. He has also directed several British television series, including Alas Smith and Jones (1989–1992) and Mr. Bean (1991–1992). His feature film credits include Made of Honor (2008), Sixty Six (2006), Blackadder: Back & Forth (1999), Roseanna's Grave (1997), City Slickers II: The Legend of Curly's Gold (1994) and Leonard Part 6 (1987).

== Early years ==
Weiland grew up Jewish in the Southgate section of London, England and attended De Bohun's school. He left school at age 17 and worked as a messenger before becoming a copywriter.

== Career ==
=== Television commercials ===
Weiland began his directing career making British television commercials. Weiland has made more than 500 commercials. Weiland's most successful advertising campaign was a series of television commercials for Walkers crisps. The commercials have featured celebrities, including English football striker Gary Lineker, boxer Lennox Lewis and Victoria Beckham. The commercials became enormously popular in Britain, leading Weiland to then say, "A friend said to me the other day that they've become like little Woody Allen films – people want to appear in them. Lennox Lewis obviously didn't need the money but felt that he wanted to be more approachable to the British public. He was interesting, did a good job, as did David Seaman and Victoria Beckham."

Weiland is the owner of The Paul Weiland Film Company and has become a multimillionaire with his work on television commercials. In the 1990s, his company won the top British TV Awards prize for five consecutive years.

=== Leonard Part 6 ===
In 1987, Weiland made his debut as a feature film director with Leonard Part 6, a comedy starring Bill Cosby as secret agent who is called out of retirement to save the world from an evil genius who has developed the ability to brainwash small animals into killing humans. The film was a critical and box office bomb. The Village Voice called it "the worst film of the decade." The Los Angeles Times wrote: "'Leonard Part 6' is a smug, tedious exercise in self-indulgence ... There's virtually nothing to laugh at in this film, and too much of everything else." The Times noted that, although Weiland was the director, "clearly Cosby, as star, producer and idea man, is the auteur here."

His direction of Leonard Part 6 resulted in Weiland's being nominated for the Golden Raspberry Award for Worst Director. Asked years later about his work on the film, Weiland recalled:

"It was a terrible mistake. ... When anyone gets into that position (Bill Cosby's position of power in the 1980s), they are surrounded by sycophants and no one tells them the truth. But Cosby just wasn't funny. I couldn't tell him directly. I'd say it feels slow, and he'd say 'You worry about construction, let me worry about funny'."

"Cosby attributed most of the movie's problems to first-time director Weiland, whom he felt was too young and inexperienced. Cosby himself was producer and writer of the story".

=== Mr. Bean ===
Between 1991 and 1992, Weiland directed several episodes of the Mr. Bean television series starring Rowan Atkinson. In 2005, The Times wrote: "The director Paul Weiland made millions laugh with the television comedy series Mr Bean and Alas Smith and Jones."

=== City Slickers II: The Legend of Curly's Gold ===
In 1994, Weiland returned to feature films as the director of City Slickers II: The Legend of Curly's Gold starring Billy Crystal, Daniel Stern, Jon Lovitz and Jack Palance. The film was a sequel to the popular 1991 film City Slickers. In the film, Billy Crystal's character discovers a treasure map and sets off with Lovitz and Stern to find the treasure of gold in the Arizona desert.

=== Blackadder: Back & Forth ===
In 2001, Weiland renewed his partnership with Rowan Atkinson, directing him in the British television film, Blackadder: Back & Forth. The film is a time travel comedy in which Atkinson's character, Lord Blackadder, travels in a time machine to the Jurassic period, Sherwood Forest, and the Battle of Waterloo. Miranda Richardson, Hugh Laurie, Stephen Fry, Colin Firth and Kate Moss also appear in the film.

Weiland was nominated for a BAFTA TV Award for his direction of the film.

=== Sixty Six ===
Weiland's 2006 feature film Sixty Six is an autobiographical comedy-drama based on Weiland's bar mitzvah which was held on the same night as England's win over West Germany in the 1966 FIFA World Cup final. As a result of the football match, guests cancelled en masse, and only a handful showed up at the bar mitzvah.

The film received generally positive reviews. The Guardian of London wrote that, "Despite the whimsical voice-over and gloopy, sentimental tone, it's a hard film to dislike and boasts a wonderfully lugubrious performance from Eddie Marsan as the round-shouldered schlub of a dad."

=== Made of Honor ===
Weiland directed the last screen appearance of Sydney Pollack, in the 2008 feature Made of Honor.

== Awards ==
Weiland has won a BAFTA Award for The Storyteller: The Three Ravens. He also won the President's Award for Lifetime Achievement at the Design & Art Directors Association. In 1983, he was nominated for a BAFTA Award for Best Short Film for directing Keep Off the Grass.

== Personal life ==
Weiland and his wife Caroline have four children together, including Hannah.

== Filmography ==
Weiland's film directing credits include:

- Leonard Part 6 (1987)
- Bernard and the Genie (1991)
- City Slickers II: The Legend of Curly's Gold (1994)
- Roseanna's Grave (1997)
- Blackadder: Back & Forth (1999, short film)
- Sixty Six (2006)
- Made of Honor (2008)
