= Karakul hat =

Traditional sheep fur hat of Central and South Asia

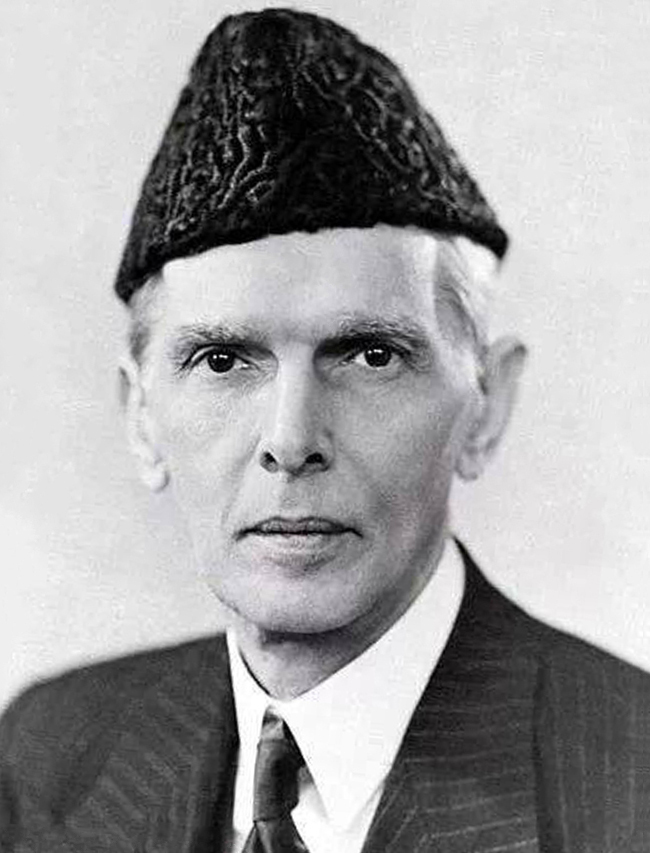
Muhammad Ali Jinnah, the founding father of Pakistan, wearing a Karakul.

The Karakul hat (قراقلی), also known by other names, (Note: It is sometimes spelled as Qaraqul hat and also known as an Astrakhan hat, Uzbek hat, and Jinnah Cap.) is a hat made from the fur (either Karakul fur or karakulcha) of the Karakul breed of sheep. The fur from which it is made is referred to as Astrakhan, broadtail, qaraqulcha, or Persian lamb. The hat is peaked, and folds flat when taken off the wearer's head.

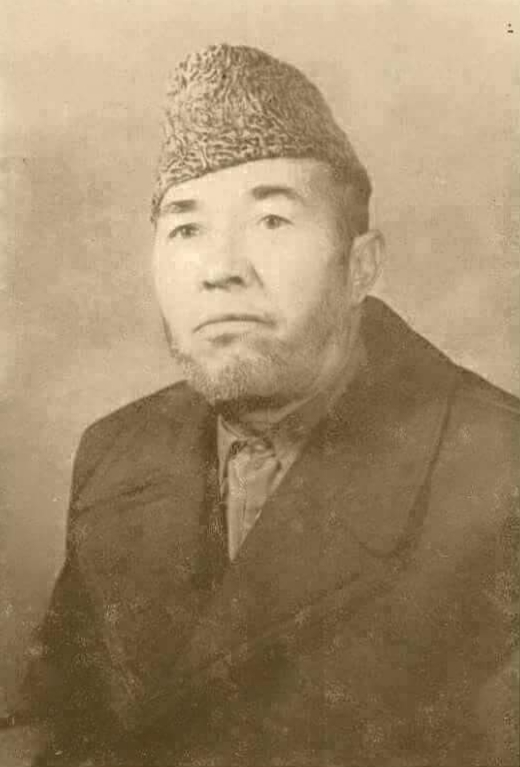
Muhammad Ibrahim Khan, Hazara leader in 1944 from Afghanistan, wearing Karakul.

The cap is typically worn by Muslim men in Central and South Asia. It was worn by Muhammad Ali Jinnah, the founding father of Pakistan, where it is known as the Jinnah cap. The karakul, which had distinguished all educated urban men since the beginning of the 20th century, has fallen out of fashion in Afghanistan and Pakistan.

== Design and production ==
In terms of design, the cap is peaked and has several parts. It folds flat when taken off the head. The cap has been particularly popular among the Muslim population of Central and South Asia, however, there is no religious significance attached to it.

The cap is made of the fur of the Qaraqul or Karakul breed of sheep, which is found in the desert areas of Central Asia. The sheep have been named in connection to the city of Qorakoʻl, a town in the Bukhara Region of Uzbekistan. Later, the cap gained popularity in Mazar-i-Sharif, a city in Afghanistan, after which Uzbek craftsmen introduced the craft to Pakistan.

The karakul fur is obtained from a newly born sheep, which gives the cap its tough and curly texture as well as a specific pattern. The karakulcha (diminutive of "karakul"), a finer and more expensive material, is taken from lamb fetuses or miscarriages.

== Kashmiri variations ==
Karakul caps have been worn by Kashmiris for the past several decades. The Karakul cap is colloquially known as a "Karakuli" in the Kashmir Valley. The traditional headgear of the gentry in Kashmir has historically been the turban tied in a similar fashion to the Pashtun equivalent.

== Gallery ==
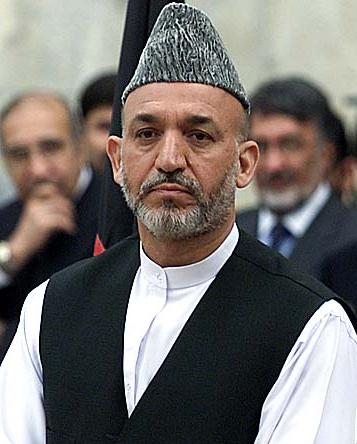
Afghanistan former president, Hamed Karzai wearing a Karakul hat

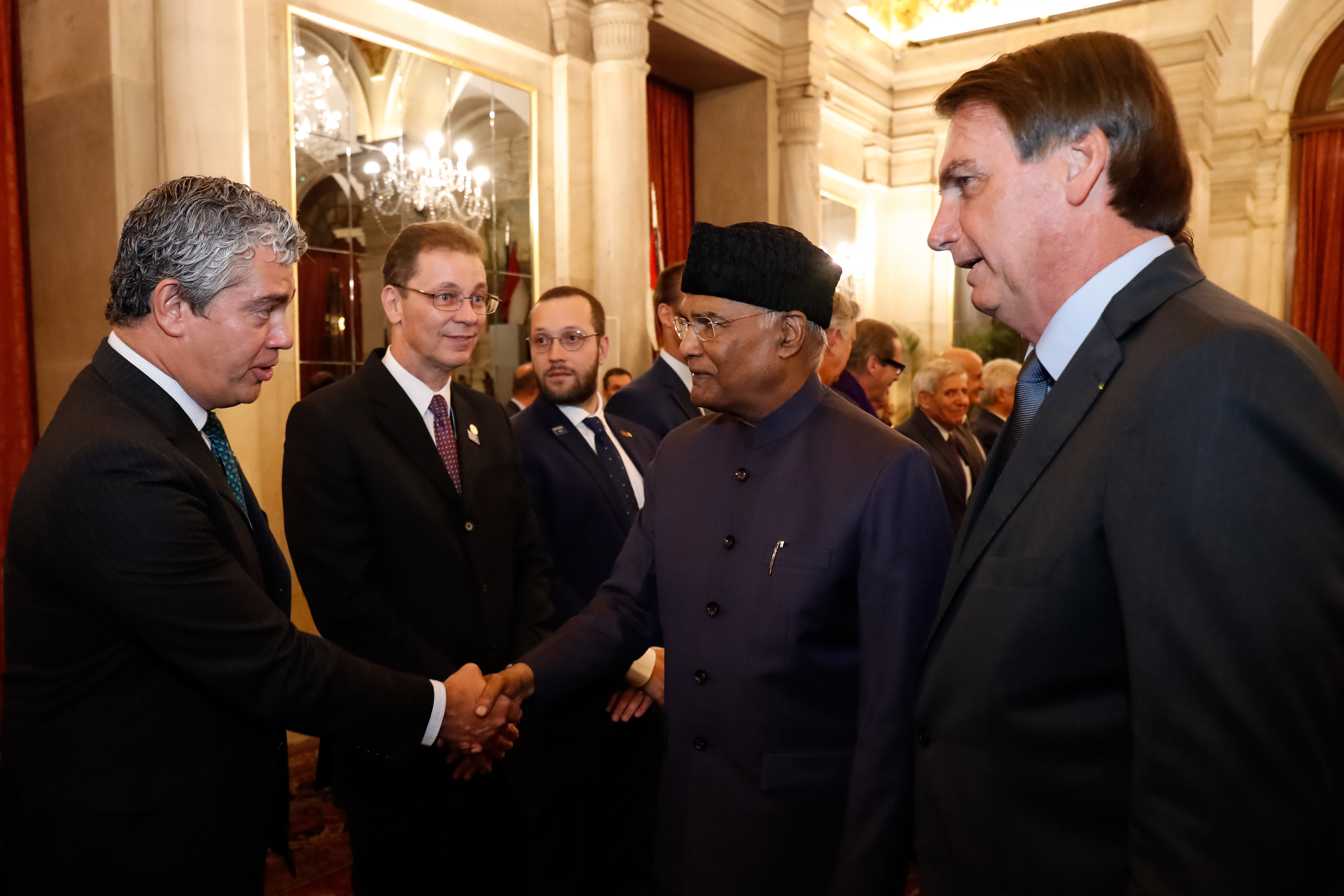
Ram Nath Kovind, former president of India, wearing the hat

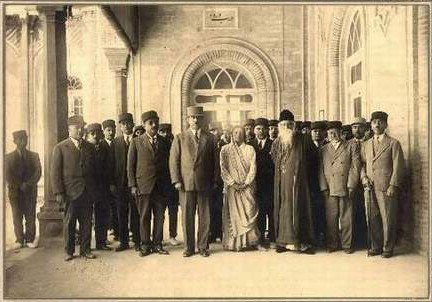
Rabindranath Tagore wearing a karakul hat in a 1932 group photograph in the Majlis of Iran

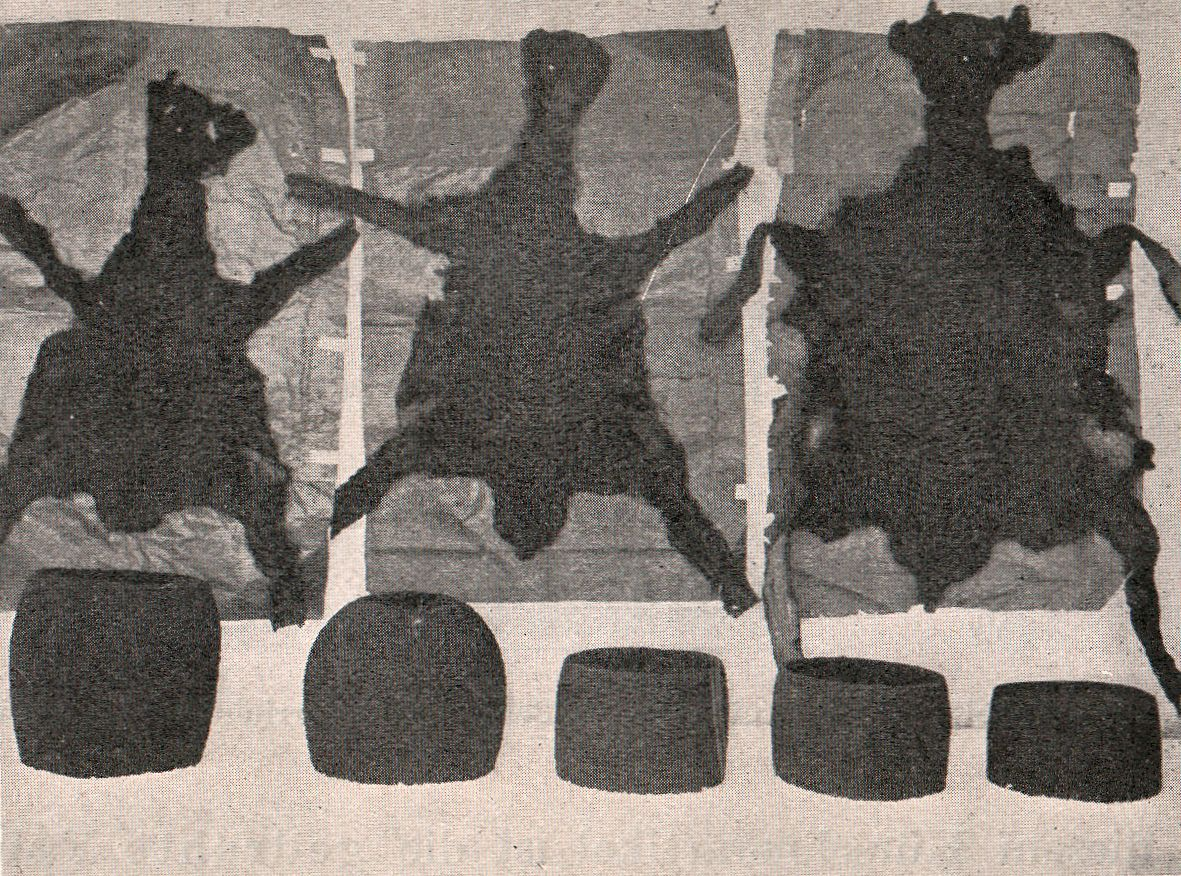
Bukhara Karakul skins and Karakul hats

== See also ==
- List of hat styles
- List of fur headgear
- Fur wedge cap, of similar shape
- Papakha, also can be made of karakul fur
- Side cap (Pilotka)
