= Zoë Paul =

British-South African artist (born 1987)

Zoë Paul (born 1987) is a London-born, Athens-based artist raised by South African parents. She combines traditional techniques with products of industrial waste to examine community, craft and domestic spaces.

== Early life and education ==
Zoë Paul's parents came to Greece from South Africa during the apartheid era. Paul was born in 1987 and grew up in the United Kingdom and Greece, on an island of Kythira. Due to her family's limited resources at the time, Paul learned how to work with various materials at an early age. She studied sculpture at Camberwell College of Arts, where she received her BA, and at Royal College of Art in London, where she earned her MA.

== Work and career ==
Paul uses sculpture, drawing, and textile to explore domestic spaces. Her work is particularly inspired by blurred lines between the interior and the exterior. As Paul is a trained sculptor, her art has also been influenced by Classical Greek sculpture.

== Exhibitions ==
Paul's solo exhibition Solitude and Village blended the divine with the domestic, featuring disembodied clay heads, frescoes of giant nudes, and sculptures inspired by Modern Primitivism. The show incorporated weavings made from discarded materials and abstract compositions resembling religious icons. Ethereal screens depicted archetypal female figures, highlighting themes of fertility and emotional power. The exhibition explored the intersection of sacred and everyday life, the tension between feminine and masculine, and the relationship between solitude and community, ultimately reflecting on the loss of communal connections due to industrialization.

Her solo exhibition La Perma-Perla Kraal Emporium, which explores hospitality and community, has been hosted at The Breeder gallery in Athens and at the Spike Island Artspace in Bristol, UK. A distinctive feature of this exhibition was a long table where Paul invited visitors to join her at rolling clay beads while drinking sage tea. The clay beads were also used to create bead curtains, which were part of Paul's exhibition and are a recurring theme throughout her art. Her work is described as transforming the gallery into an intimate, temple-like space, showcasing ceramic and textile works that evoke ancient relics.

Her collaboration with British painter Faye Wei Wei, exhibition Marzanna, Yours Again was hosted at Hot Wheels Projects in Athens. This exhibition was inspired by Eastern European mythology and folkloric rituals of making dolls to invite the arrival of spring.

Paul's work has also been included in the Unorthodox exhibition at the Jewish Museum (Manhattan) and in The Equilibrists exhibition at the Benaki Museum in Athens.
