= Hannah Weiland =

English fashion designer (born 1990)

- Born: Hannah Weiland; 5 March 1990 (age 36); London, United Kingdom
- Occupation: Fashion designer
- Years active: 2012–present
- Known for: Shrimps Fashion Brand
- Father: Paul Weiland

Hannah Weiland (born 5 March 1990) is an English fashion designer. Weiland's brand, Shrimps, was a finalist for the BFC/Vogue Designer Fashion Fund 2017. She started Shrimps in 2013 after attending The London College of Fashion.

Shrimps became famous for its signature faux fur coats, garnering support from animal rights activists such as PETA. The brand had regular presentations at London Fashion Week from their first season and beyond. Hannah is the daughter of film director Paul Weiland.

She is married to Arthur Guinness.
