= Shrimps (brand) =

British fashion brand founded by Hannah Weiland

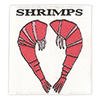
- Company type: Private Company
- Industry: Fashion
- Founded: 2013
- Headquarters: London, UK
- Key people: Hannah Weiland (Founder & Creative Director)
- Products: Clothes, shoes, accessories

Shrimps is a fashion label founded by London-based designer, Hannah Weiland, launched in 2013. Originally launched with one faux fur coat and then centred around faux fur outerwear and accessories, Shrimps is now a full RTW label offering a variety of pieces as well as the faux fur outerwear that made its name. Shrimps became famous for its signature faux fur coats, garnering support from animal rights activists such as PETA, and drawing new attention to faux fur as a fabric in fashion.

Early supporters of the brand include Laura Bailey, Natalie Massenet, Adwoa Aboah, Alexa Chung, amongst others.

Shrimps presents new collections seasonally on schedule at London Fashion Week. Stockists for the brand include: Dover Street Market, Selfridges, Matchesfashion.com, Nordstrom, Bon Marché, BOONTHESHOP and Mytheresa.

== Aesthetic and inspiration ==
With a background in History of Art and a diploma in Surface Textile Design from the London College of Fashion, Weiland draws her inspiration from modern art, patters and textures. Her designs emphasize color and texture. While the brand initially focused on faux fur and outerwear, it has since expanded to include full ready-to-wear collections and accessories.
