= Karakul sheep =

Breed of domestic sheep originating in Central Asia

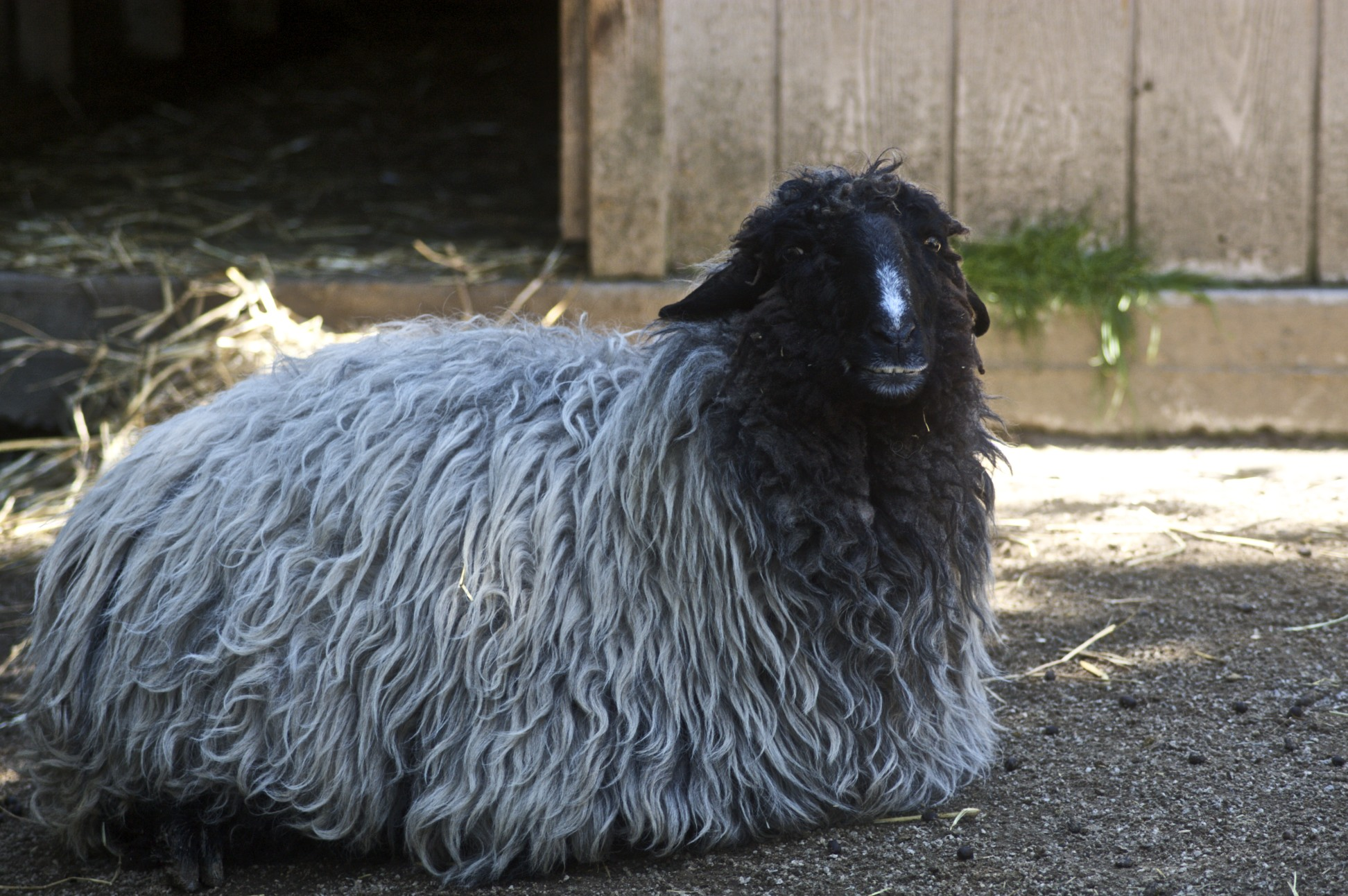
Karakul sheep in Akron Zoo

Karakul or Qaraqul (named after Qorakoʻl, a city in Bukhara Region in Uzbekistan) is a breed of domestic fat-tailed sheep which originated in Central Asia. Some archaeological evidence points to Karakul sheep being raised there continuously since 1400 BC.

Hailing from the desert regions of Central Asia, Karakul sheep are renowned for their ability to forage and thrive under extremely harsh living conditions. They can survive severe drought conditions because they store reserves for lean times as fat in their tails. Karakul are also raised in large numbers in Namibia, having first been brought there by German colonists in the early 20th century. They are currently listed as endangered.

== Use by humans ==
Karakul sheep are a multi-purpose breed, kept for milking, meat, pelts, and wool. As a fat-tailed breed, they have a distinctive meat. Many adult Karakul are double-coated; in this case, a spinner would separate the coarse guard hair from the undercoat. Karakul is a relatively coarse fiber used for outer garments, carpets and for felting.

The meat from the sheep, and especially the fat from the tail end, is an important ingredient in Uzbek cuisine.

=== Karakul pelts ===
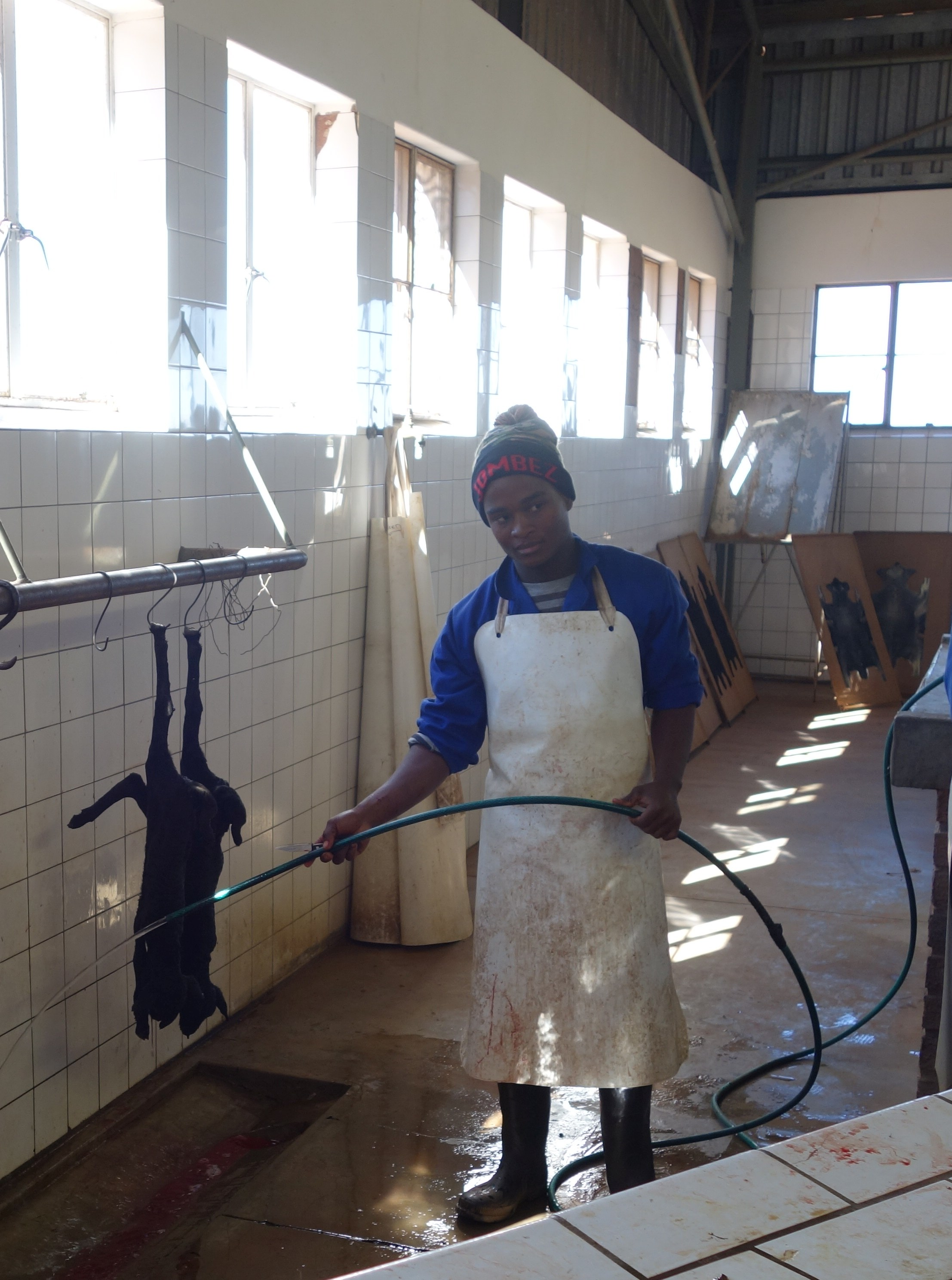
Washing of slaughtered lambs in Namibia

Very young or even fetal Karakul lambs are prized for pelts. Newborn karakul sheep pelts are called karakul (also spelled caracul), swakara (portmanteau of South West Africa Karakul), astrakhan (Russian and French), Persian lamb, agnello di Persia (Italian), krimmer (Russian) and garaköli bagana (Turkmen). Sometimes the terms for newborn lambs' and fetal lambs' pelts are used interchangeably. The newborn lambs have a tight, curly pattern of hair. The lambs must be under three days old when they are killed, or they will lose their black color and soft, tightly wound coils of fur. Dark colors are dominant and lambs often darken in color as they age. Fetal karakul lamb pelts are called broadtail, Breitschwanz (German), and karakulcha. Fetal karakul lambs are harvested through miscarriages, induced early delivery or by killing the mother sheep and removing the fetus. Rather than killing healthy female sheep, farmers will kill older sheep that have already given birth many times. People use the lamb pelts to create various clothing items, such as the karakul hat. The pelts have also been used in haute couture.
