= Yanova =

Yanova could refer to the following places:

- Ineu in Romania
- Janjevo in Kosovo
- Jonava in Lithuania
