= Dodaj =

Dodaj is an Albanian surname. Notable people with the surname include:

- Arjan Dodaj (born 1977), Albanian Roman Catholic archbishop
- Kevin Dodaj (born 2005), Albanian footballer
- Pal Dodaj (1880–1951), Albanian Catholic priest, teacher, translator and philosopher
