= Šubara =

Hat used by the Serbs in folk attire

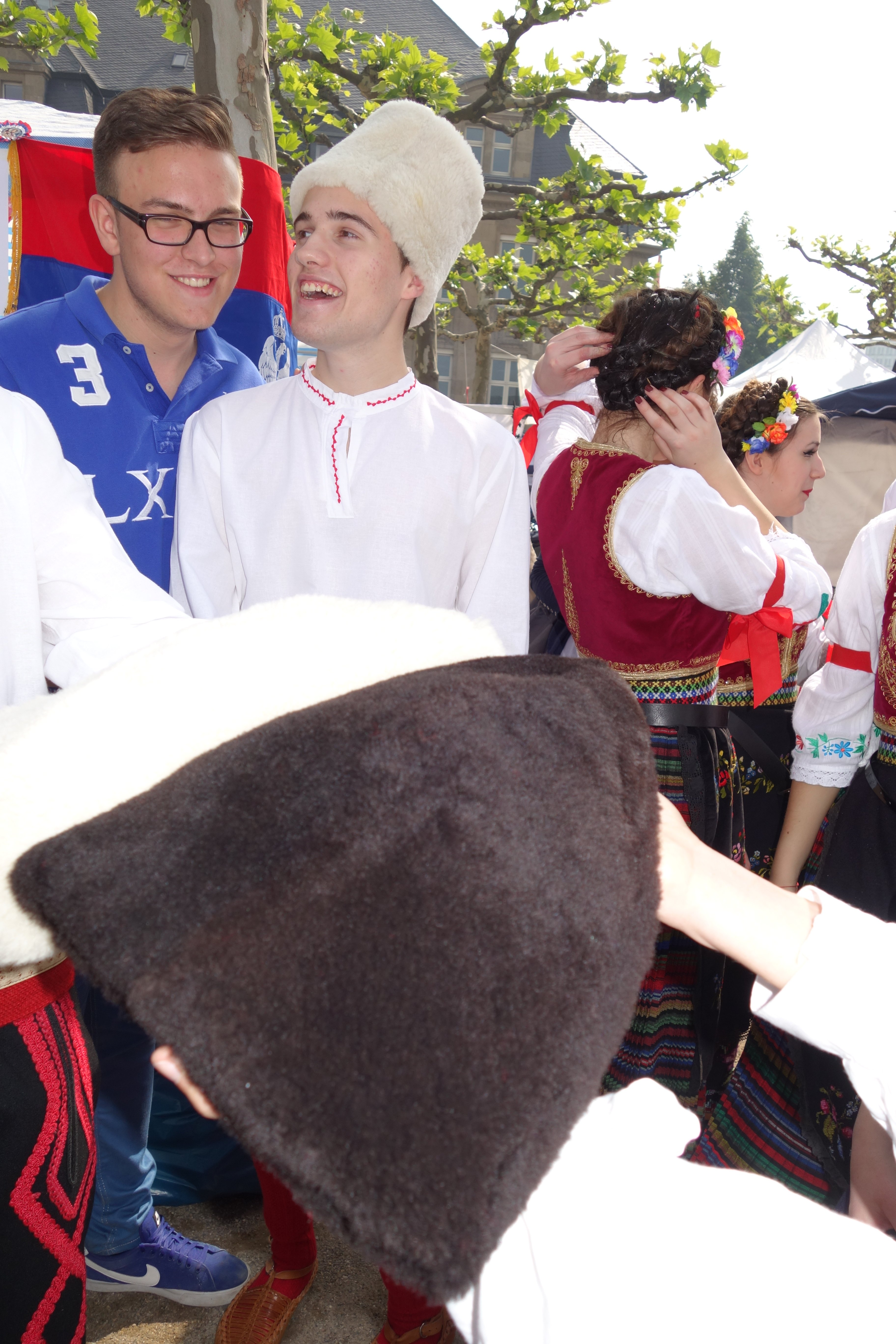
Civil šubaras worn by the members of the Serbian folklore group in Düsseldorf (2014)

The šubara (Serbian Cyrillic: шубара) is a type of traditional male winter hat used mostly by the Serbs, but also Macedonians and Janjevci in their folk attire. It is in a conical or cylindrical shape predominantly in black colour, because of the black lamb/sheep fur (woollen). The šubara is a traditional peasant hat used in harsher and colder times.

It was used in World War I by the Serbian soldiers and by the Chetniks in World War II and again during the Yugoslav Wars. It usually has the cockade (kokarda) of the Serbian eagle or other Serbian symbols.

== See also ==
- Serbian Folk attire
- Goran Šubara, Australian Serb footballer
- Petar Šubara, Yugoslav major (Šubara was a nickname)
- Woolen hats used by other peoples:
  - Ushanka, Hat used in Russia (Soviet fur cap)
  - Papakhi, Hat used in Caucasia
  - Karakul, Hat used in Central and South Asia
