= Albanisation =

Spread of Albanian culture, people and language

Albanisation is the spread of Albanian culture, people, and language, either by integration or assimilation. Diverse peoples were affected by Albanisation including peoples with different ethnic origins, such as Turks, Serbs, Croats, Circassians, Bosniaks, Greeks, Aromanians, Ashkali and Balkan Egyptians, Romani, Gorani, and Macedonians from all the regions of the Balkans.

== Greater Albania (1940–1944) ==
In the newly attached territories to Albania of Kosovo and western Yugoslav Macedonia by the Axis powers, non-Albanians (Serbs and Macedonians) had to attend Albanian schools that taught a curriculum containing nationalism alongside fascism and were made to adopt Albanian forms for their names and surnames.

== In Albania ==
The Albanian civil service tends to use albanianized versions of personal names of persons belonging to ethnic or cultural minorities without their consent.

In 1975, the Albanian communist regime issued a decree requiring everyone to assume non-religious names approved by the government.

=== Greeks ===
During the rule of King Zogu and the communist regime, the government encouraged Albanisation of the Greeks of Southern Albania (the territory was also called "Northern Epirus", especially among the Greeks).

... minority status was limited to those who lived in 99 villages in the southern border areas, thereby excluding important concentrations of Greek settlement in Vlora (perhaps 8,000 people in 1994) and in adjoining areas along the coast, ancestral Greek towns such as Himara, and ethnic Greeks living elsewhere throughout the country. Mixed villages outside this designated zone, even those with a clear majority of ethnic Greeks, were not considered minority areas and therefore were denied any Greek-language cultural or educational provisions. In addition, many Greeks were forceably removed from the minority zones to other parts of the country as a product of communist population policy, an important and constant element of which was to preempt ethnic sources of political dissent. Greek place-names were changed to Albanian names, while use of the Greek language, prohibited everywhere outside the minority zones, was prohibited for many official purposes within them as well.

In 1967 the Albanian Party of Labour began the campaign of eradicating organised religion. Their forces damaged or destroyed many churches and mosques during this period; they banned many Greek-language books because of their religious themes or orientation. Yet, it is often impossible to distinguish between the government's ideological and ethno-cultural motivations for repression. Albania’s anti-religion campaign was merely one element in Hoxha's broader “Ideological and Cultural Revolution” begun in 1966. He had outlined its main features at the PLA’s Fourth Congress in 1961. "Under communism, pupils were taught only Albanian history and culture, even in Greek-language classes at the primary level."

Also, the ethnic Greek minority complained about the government's unwillingness to recognize ethnic Greek towns outside communist-era "minority zones," to utilize Greek in official documents and on public signs in ethnic Greek areas, or to include more ethnic Greeks in public administration.

The 2012 USA annual report mention that the emergence of strident nationalist groups like the Red and Black Alliance (RBA) increased ethnic tensions with the Greek minority groups.

=== Serbs and Montenegrins ===
As part of assimilation politics during the rule of communist regime in Albania, Serb-Montenegrins were not allowed to have Serbian names, especially family names ending with the characteristic suffix "ich".

After the 1981 student protest in Kosovo, Albanian Serbs complained on harassment and pressure to leave the country.

=== Proposed Albanianisation ===
Former Albanian President Bamir Topi and prime minister Sali Berisha made suggestions in 2009 to create a government commission to replace Slavic based toponyms in the county with Albanian language form toponyms.

=== Reversed Albanianisation ===
The Albanian parliament in April 2013 decided to reverse an order from 1973 that changed the Slavic toponyms of several villages in the Pustec Municipality (formerly Liqenas) with Albanian forms that resulted in local Pustec authorities voting to restore pre-1973 toponyms.

== In Kosovo ==
The concept is most commonly applied to Kosovo. During censuses in the former Yugoslavia, many Bosniaks, Romani and Turks were registered as Albanian, as they identified with Muslim Albanian culture as opposed to the Orthodox Christian Serbian culture. Albanisation has also occurred with Torbesh people, a Muslim Slavic minority in North Macedonia, and the Goran people in southern Kosovo, who often have Albanised surnames.

=== Orahovac ===
At the end of the 19th century, writer Branislav Nušić claimed that the Serb poturice (converts to Islam) of Orahovac began speaking Albanian and marrying Albanian women. Similar claims were put forward by Jovan Hadži Vasiljević (1866–1948), who claimed that when he visited Orahovac in World War I, he could not distinguish Orthodox from Islamicized and Albanized Serbs; according to him, they spoke Serbian, wore the same costumes, but claimed Serbian, Albanian or Turkish ethnicity. Most of the Albanian starosedeoci (old urban families) were Slavophone; they did not speak Albanian at home, but a Slavic dialect which they called naš govor 'our language'. An Austrian named Joseph Muller, who visited the area in the 19th century, wrote that the dialect originated from the time of the First Serbian Uprising against the Ottomans, when Albanians from Shkodër who had resettled around Valjevo and Kraljevo in central Serbia, left after those events for Orahovac; the corpus of Bulgarian terminology in the dialect was unaccounted for by Muller.

In the 1921 census, the majority of the Muslim Albanians in Orahovac were registered under the category "Serbs and Croats", based on linguistic criteria.

Duijzings (2000), summarizing his own research, stated: "During my own research, some of them told me that their tongue is similar to Macedonian rather than Serbian. It is likely they are the last remnants of what is now known in Serbian sources as Arnautaši, Islamicised and half-way Albanianised Slavs."

=== Janjevo ===
In 1922, Henry Baerlein noted that the Austrians had for thirty years tried to Albanianize the Janjevo population (see also Janjevci).

=== Ashkali and Romani ===
The Ashkali and Balkan Egyptians, who share culture, traditions and the Albanian language, are of Romani origin. The "Ashkali" have been classed as a "new ethnic identity in the Balkans", formed in the 1990s.

=== Placenames ===
To define Kosovo as an Albanian area, a toponyms commission (1999) led by Kosovan Albanian academics was established to determine new or alternative names for some settlements, streets, squares and organisations with Slavic origins that underwent a process of Albanisation during this period. Those measures have been promoted by sectors of the Kosovan Albanian academic, political, literary and media elite that caused administrative and societal confusion with multiple toponyms being used resulting in sporadic acceptance by wider Kosovan Albanian society.

=== Alleged Albanianisation ===
In 1987 Yugoslav communist officials changed the starting grade from the fourth to the first for Kosovo Serb and Albanian students being taught each other's languages with aims of bringing both ethnicities closer. Kosovo Serbs opposed the measure to learn the Albanian language, claiming that it was another way of asserting Albanian dominance and viewed it as more Albanisation of the region. Yugoslav educational authorities rejected the claim, stating that if Albanians also refused to learn Serbo-Croatian on the grounds that it was Serbianisation, it would be unacceptable.

== In North Macedonia ==
=== Alleged Albanianisation ===
In 1982 Macedonian communist officials accused Albanian nationalists (including some Muslim Albanian clergy) that they placed pressure on Macedonian Romani, Turks and Macedonian speaking Muslims (Torbeš) to declare themselves as Albanians during the census. The Islamic Community of Yugoslavia dominated by Slavic Muslims opposed during the 1980s Albanian candidates ascending to the leadership position of Reis ul-ulema due to claims that Albanian Muslim clergy were attempting to Albanianize the Muslim Slavs of Macedonia. Macedonian communist authorities concerned with growing Albanian nationalism contended that Turks and Macedonian speaking Muslims (Torbeš) were being Albanianised through Albanian political and cultural pressures and initiated a campaign against Albanian nationalism called differentiation involving birth control, control over Muslim institutions and Albanian education, dismissal of public servants and so on.

Riza Memedovski, chairman of a Muslim organisation for Macedonian Muslims in North Macedonia, accused the majority Albanian political party, the Party for Democratic Prosperity in 1990 of trying to assimilate people, especially Macedonian Muslims and Turks and create an "... Albanisation of western Macedonia."

From a Macedonian perspective, the Old Bazaar of Skopje following the 1960s and over a span of twenty to thirty years underwent a demographic change of Albanisation that was reflected in the usage of the Latin alphabet and Albanian writing in shops of the area. In the 2000s, the construction of a Skanderbeg statue at the entrance of the Old Bazaar has signified for some people in Macedonia that the area is undergoing a slow Albanisation.

== Sources ==
- Babuna, Aydin (2004). "The Bosnian Muslims and Albanians: Islam and Nationalism". Nationalities Papers. 32 (2): 287–321. doi:10.1080/0090599042000230250. S2CID 162218149.
- Drašković, Aleksandar (1991) [1990]. Nacionalne manjine u Albaniji poslije Drugog svjetskog rata. Становништво словенског поријекла у Албанији. Titograd: Историјски институт СР Црне Горе.
- Duijzings, Ger (2000). Religion and the Politics of Identity in Kosovo. C. Hurst & Co. Publishers. ISBN 978-1-85065-431-5.
- Liotta, P. H. (1999). The Wreckage Reconsidered: Five Oxymorons from Balkan Deconstruction. Lexington Books. pp. 101–. ISBN 978-0-7391-0012-7.
- Šćepanović, Slobodan (1991) [1990]. Најновији демографски и други подаци о Враки. Становништво словенског поријекла у Албанији. Titograd: Историјски институт СР Црне Горе.
- Sremac, Danielle S. (1999). War of Words: Washington Tackles the Yugoslav Conflict. Greenwood Publishing Group. pp. 43–. ISBN 978-0-275-96609-6.
- Grečić, Vladimir; Lopušina, Marko (1994). "Srbi – nacionalne manjine u starim i novim susednim zemljama: Albanija". Svi Srbi Sveta (in Serbo-Croatian). IP Princip. pp. 69–73. ISBN 9788682273028.
