= Church of St. Nicholas, Janjevo =

Roman Catholic Church in Janjevo

Coordinates: 42°34′26.03″N 21°14′56.68″E

Church of St. Nicholas
- Croatian: Crkva Svetog Nikole
- Albanian: Kisha e Shën Nikollës
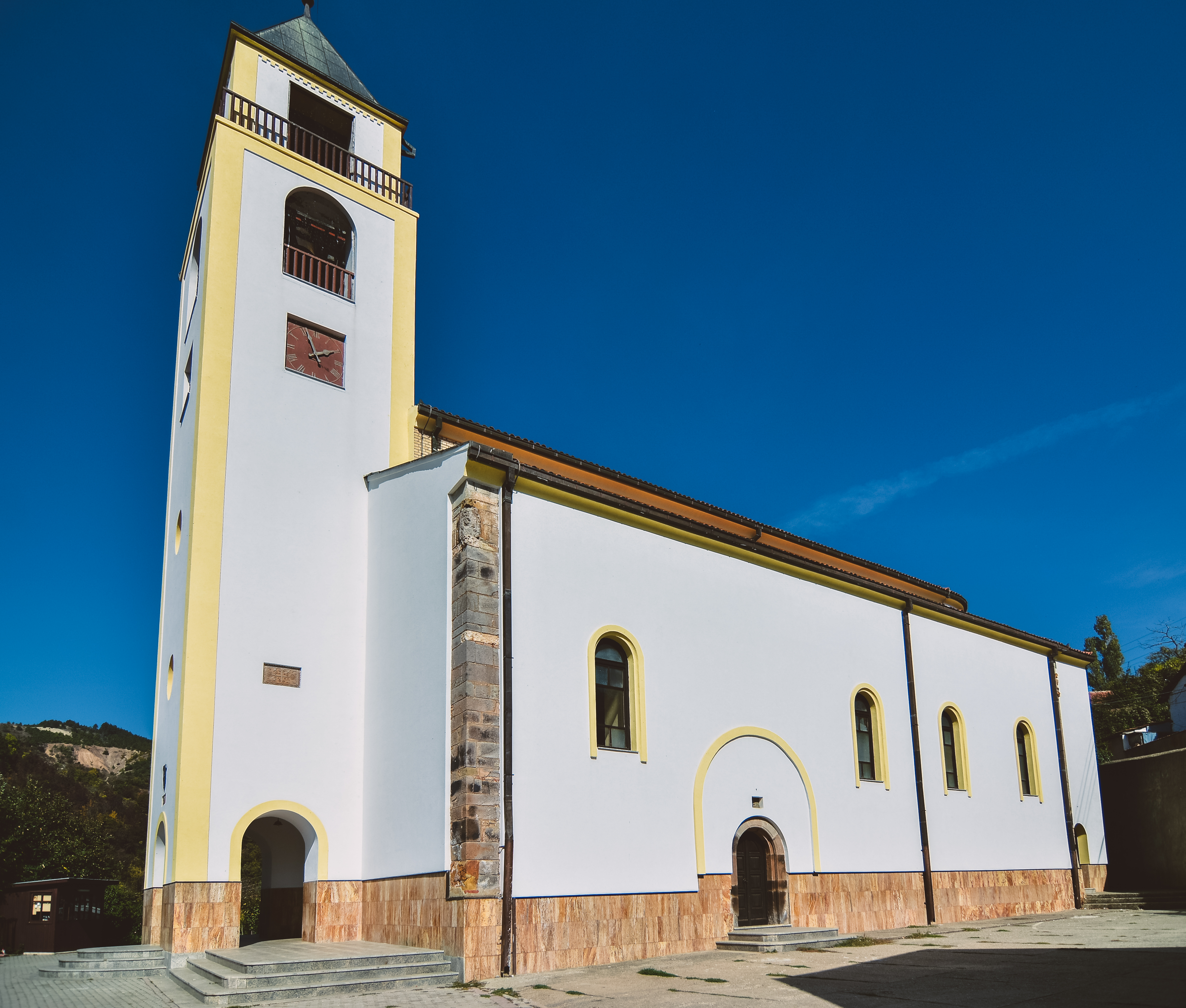
- The Church of St. Nicholas in Janjevo
- Church of St. Nicholas
- Location: Janjevo, Lipjan
- Country: Kosovo
- Denomination: Roman Catholic

History
- Status: Parish church
- Dedication: Saint Nicholas

Architecture
- Functional status: Active
- Years built: 19th century
- Groundbreaking: 1856
- Completed: 19th century

Administration
- Diocese: Roman Catholic Diocese of Prizren-Pristina
- Parish: Janjevo

The Church of St. Nicholas (Croatian: Crkva Svetog Nikole; Albanian: Kisha e Shën Nikollës) is a Roman Catholic parish church in Janjevo, Lipjan, Kosovo. Dedicated to Saint Nicholas, it has historically served as the principal Catholic church of Janjevo and as an important religious and cultural centre for the local Croat community.

The Catholic parish of Janjevo has medieval origins. Janjevo is recorded as a Catholic parish as early as 1303, while later medieval documents identify the parish church with Saint Nicholas. A priest named Andreas is recorded as parish priest of Janjevo in 1441, with parish associated with the Church of St. Nicholas.

== History ==
=== Medieval period ===
The Catholic presence in Janjevo dates to the Middle Ages, when the settlement developed as a mining and trading centre. The earliest known written reference to Janjevo as a Catholic parish dates to 1303. During the 14th and 15th centuries, the parish was connected with Catholic merchants and mining communities from the eastern Adriatic, including settlers associated with Dubrovnik and Kotor.

Medieval records identify the parish as being dedicated to Saint Nicholas. A priest named Andreas, described in a Ragusan document as "Andreas plebanus sancti Nicolai de Agneva", is recorded as parish priest in 1441.

A notable surviving object associated with the church is its bell, cast in 1368. The bell bears a Gothic inscription and is attributed to the founders or bell-founders Michael and Nicolaus. It is regarded as one of the oldest dated church bells associated with the Croatian community.

=== Ottoman period ===
Following the Ottoman conquest of the region in the 15th century, the Catholic community of Janjevo continued to exist. Catholic reports from the early modern period continued to record the parish and it's church dedicated to Saint Nicholas.

The parish maintained connections with Catholic centres in the Adriatic and with the Catholic hierarchy responsible for the region. Janjevo subsequently became an important centre of Catholic life among the communities descended from medieval and early modern settlers from the Adriatic region.

=== 19th and 20th centuries ===
The church building underwent substantial construction in the 19th century. According to United Nations Development Programme, the old church was demolished in 1856, after which Don Pal Berišić began construction of a new church influenced by Hungarian architectural styles. The building initially combined Byzantine architectural features with a predominantly Roman interior.

The church subsequently underwent further architectural changes. In 1935, Bishop Viktor Zakrajšek removed the Byzantine-style bell towers and introduced features intended to establish greater architectural continuity with churches in Dalmatia.

The interior was re-designed during the mid-20th century. The domes were removed between 1963 and 1965, further altering the appearance of the building.

The church and parish remained central to the cultural and religious life of the Janjevci. The parish church functioned not only as a place of worship but also as a gathering place and cultural centre for the local Croat community.

== Architecture ==
The present church reflects several phases of construction and alteration. Its architectural history combines elements described as Byzantine, Roman and later Dalmatian-influenced, reflecting the successive modifications made to the building during the 19th and 20th centuries.

The surviving medieval bell is particularly significant. Cast in 1368, it predates the present structure by several centuries and represents an important surviving object from the medieval Catholic community of Janjevo.

== Cultural significance ==
The Church of St. Nicholas has historically been closely associated with the Janjevci, a Croatian community whose presence in Kosovo dates to the medieval period. Catholicism played an important role in maintaining the community's religious and cultural identity over the centuries.

The church's 1368 bell is particularly associated with the historical heritage of the Janjevci. Croatian sources describe it as one of the oldest dated bells connected with the Croatian community.

The parish also played a role in the preservation of religious and cultural traditions among Janjevci living in Kosovo and among the community's diaspora, particularly following the large-scale emigration of Janjevci to Croatia during the late 20th century.

== Restoration ==
In the 2010s, the church underwent restoration and rehabilitation work supported by the European Union's Instrument contributing to Stability and Peace and implemented by the United Nations Development Programme in Kosovo.

The restoration works included repairs to the damaged northern roof, construction of a new roof structure and covering, metalwork, reconstruction of wooden stairs in the bell tower, and repairs to damaged interior walls.

== See also ==
- Janjevo
- Janjevci
- Roman Catholic Diocese of Prizren-Pristina
- Saint Nicholas
- Catholic Church in Kosovo
