= Croatia–Kosovo relations =

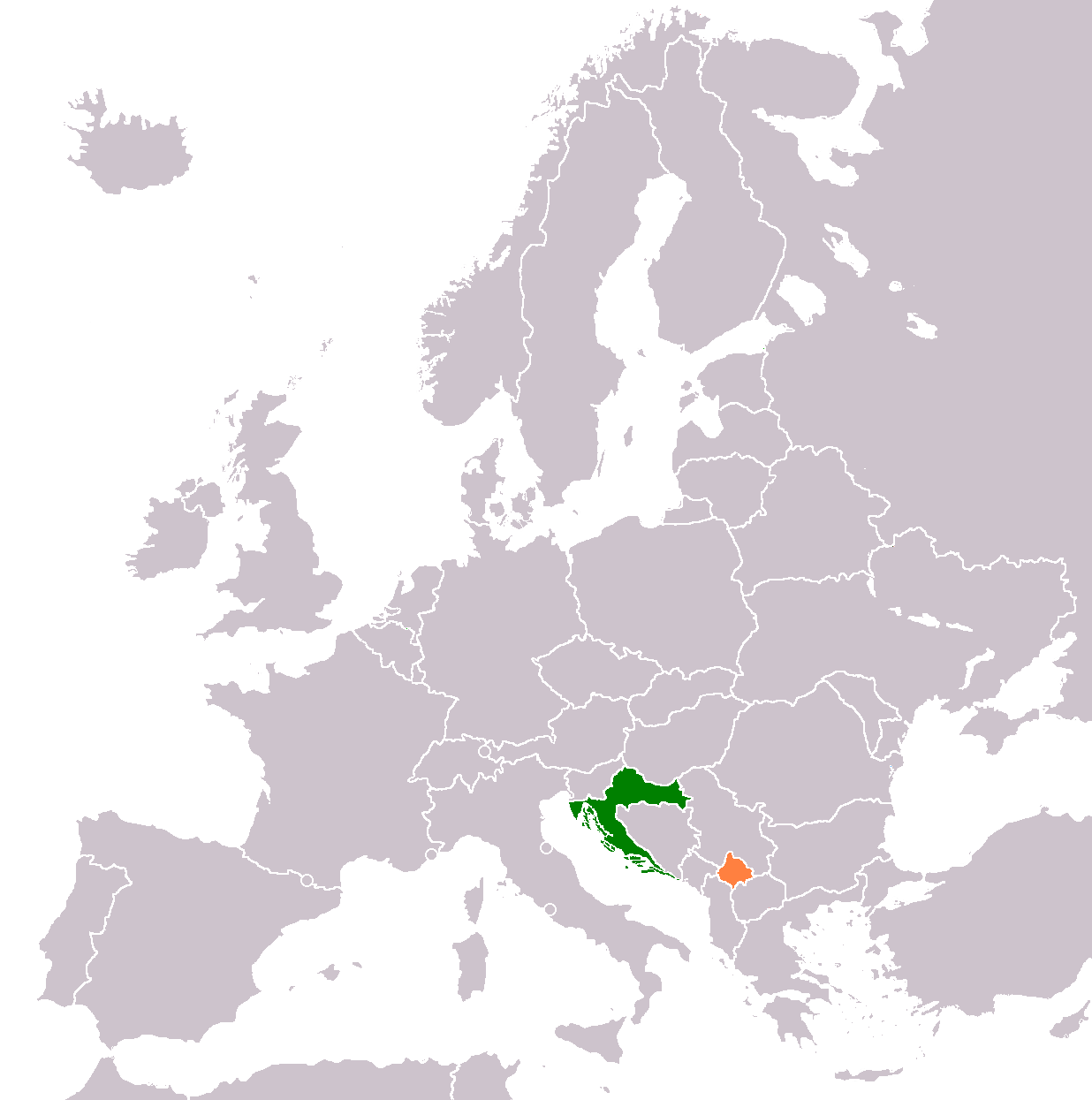

- Croatia: Kosovo

Diplomatic mission
- Embassy of Croatia, Pristina: Embassy of Kosovo, Zagreb

Envoy
- Ambassador Marija Kapitanović: Ambassador Martin Berishaj

Croatia–Kosovo relations are the bilateral relations of Croatia and Kosovo. Diplomatic relations between the two countries were established on 30 June 2008, following Kosovo's declaration of independence. Both countries were part of Yugoslavia from 1918 to 1991. They have historically shared a special relationship due to their convergent nation-building efforts. Modern relations between the two countries are warm and friendly. Croatia has an embassy in Pristina, and Kosovo has one in Zagreb.

== History ==
Croatia recognised Kosovo on 19 March 2008. The two countries established diplomatic relations on 30 June 2008. On 7 November 2008 Croatia upgraded its liaison office in Pristina to an embassy. On 19 February 2010 Kosovo opened its embassy in Zagreb. On 9 April 2015 Croatia and Kosovo signed a European partnership agreement that formalized the framework of their cooperation in the reform of Kosovo's institutions according to European standards. Croatian and Kosovo state officials meet regularly. Croatia supported Kosovo at the International Court of Justice's oral debate on the legality of Kosovo's independence. On 27 September 2021 Croatian president Zoran Milanović supported Kosovo in its dispute with Serbia over the new law that prohibited Serbian registered car plates from entering Kosovo without a having a temporarily Kosovo licensed car plate that would be registered upon its border with Serbia. He justified the decision by stating: "Kosovo has responded with reciprocal measures to something Serbia has been doing for ten years. If you cannot go to Serbia with Kosovo license plates, then Kosovo can decide that the same applies to cars from Serbia”.

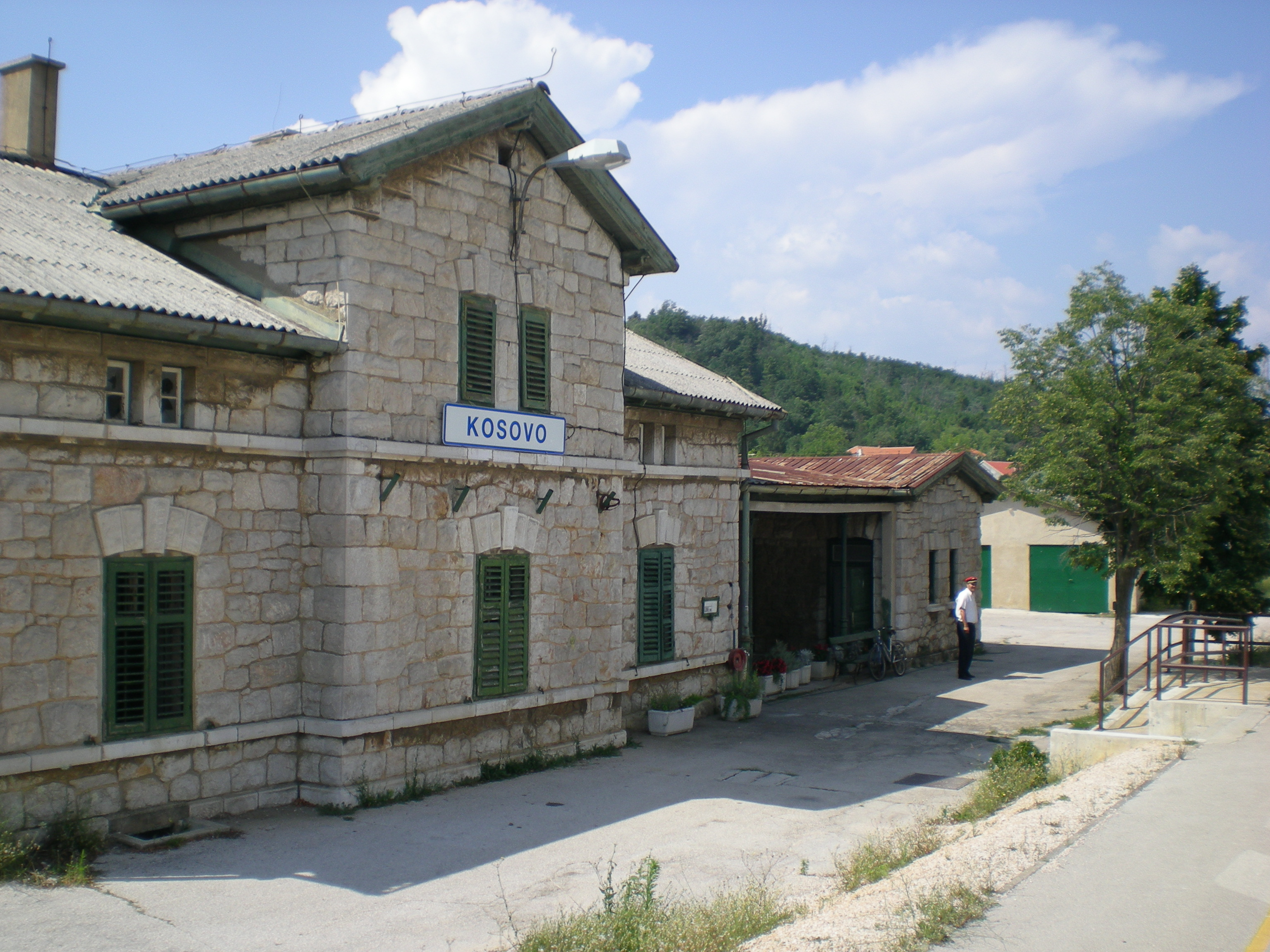
The Kosovo railway station, between the Croatian cities of Zagreb and Split, is named after Kosovo, 2013

The relationship between Croatia and Kosovo is also reinforced by their shared history of striving for independence from Yugoslavia. This historical context underpins their political solidarity. Croatia has focused on improving the status of the Croatian minority in Kosovo, marking the longstanding presence and contributions of Croats in the region. Croatia has focused on improving the status of the Croatian minority in Kosovo, marking the longstanding presence and contributions of Croats in the region. In 2023, Croatian officials celebrated the 720th anniversary of the first mention of Janjevo, highlighting the deep-rooted Croatian community in Kosovo. Additionally, bilateral cultural exchanges and educational initiatives have further strengthened the ties between the two nations, promoting mutual understanding and cooperation.

Recent diplomatic visits have highlighted the close partnership between the two countries. For instance, the visit by Kosovo's deputy prime minister Donika Gërvalla-Schwarz to Croatia in 2023 emphasized the strong political and economic bonds. Meetings between top officials often include discussions on mutual support, regional stability, and cooperation in international arenas. These engagements have facilitated significant progress in economic relations, with increased trade and business forums showcasing the potential for further collaboration. Additionally, Croatia has reiterated its support for Kosovo's EU aspirations, providing guidance and sharing its own experiences of integration. The two countries have also discussed common security concerns, working together to strengthen peacekeeping initiatives in the region. Croatia’s backing remains crucial for Kosovo as it continues its path towards greater international recognition and integration. This cooperation also extends to cultural and educational exchanges, deepening the ties between the two nations and creating a foundation for long-term diplomatic relations.

== Military cooperation ==
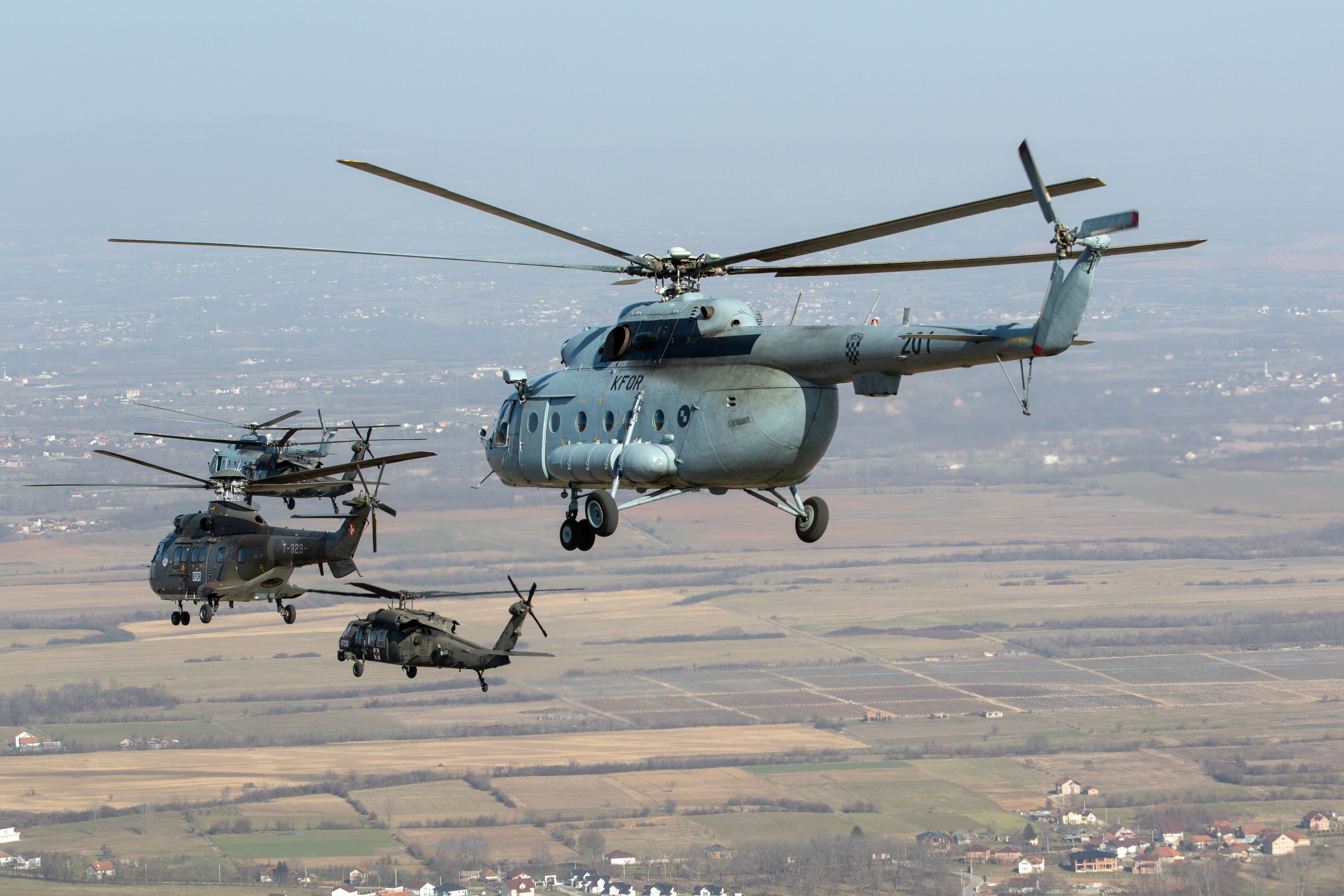
Helicopters from Croatia and the U.S. fly in formation over Kosovo, 2021

Croatia and the Kosovo are close military allies with strong bilateral cooperation. On 15 July 2008 the Croatian Parliament approved Croatia's participation in the KFOR mission, a NATO-led peacekeeping mission in Kosovo. Croatia sent the first contingent consisting of 20 soldiers and 2 Mil Mi-17 helicopters to Kosovo on 1 July 2009. On 25 September 2015 the Parliament decided that Croatia can send up to 35 soldiers and 2 helicopters to Kosovo. The basic task of the Croatian contingent is to transport KFOR forces, cargo, and VIPs. As of 2019, Croatia has 34 troops serving in Kosovo, which is the 30th contingent so far.

The 4th prime minister of Kosovo, Agim Çeku, participated in the Croatian War of Independence as a brigadier in the Croatian Army. He regularly resides in Zadar where he was a professor at a local military school between 1984 and 1990.

On the 18 March 2025, Croatia, Kosovo and Albania signed a joint agreement to form a military alliance. The size of the alliance is not limited, with Bulgaria already receiving an invitation to join. Neighboring Serbia disapproved of the alliance.

== Diplomatic relations ==
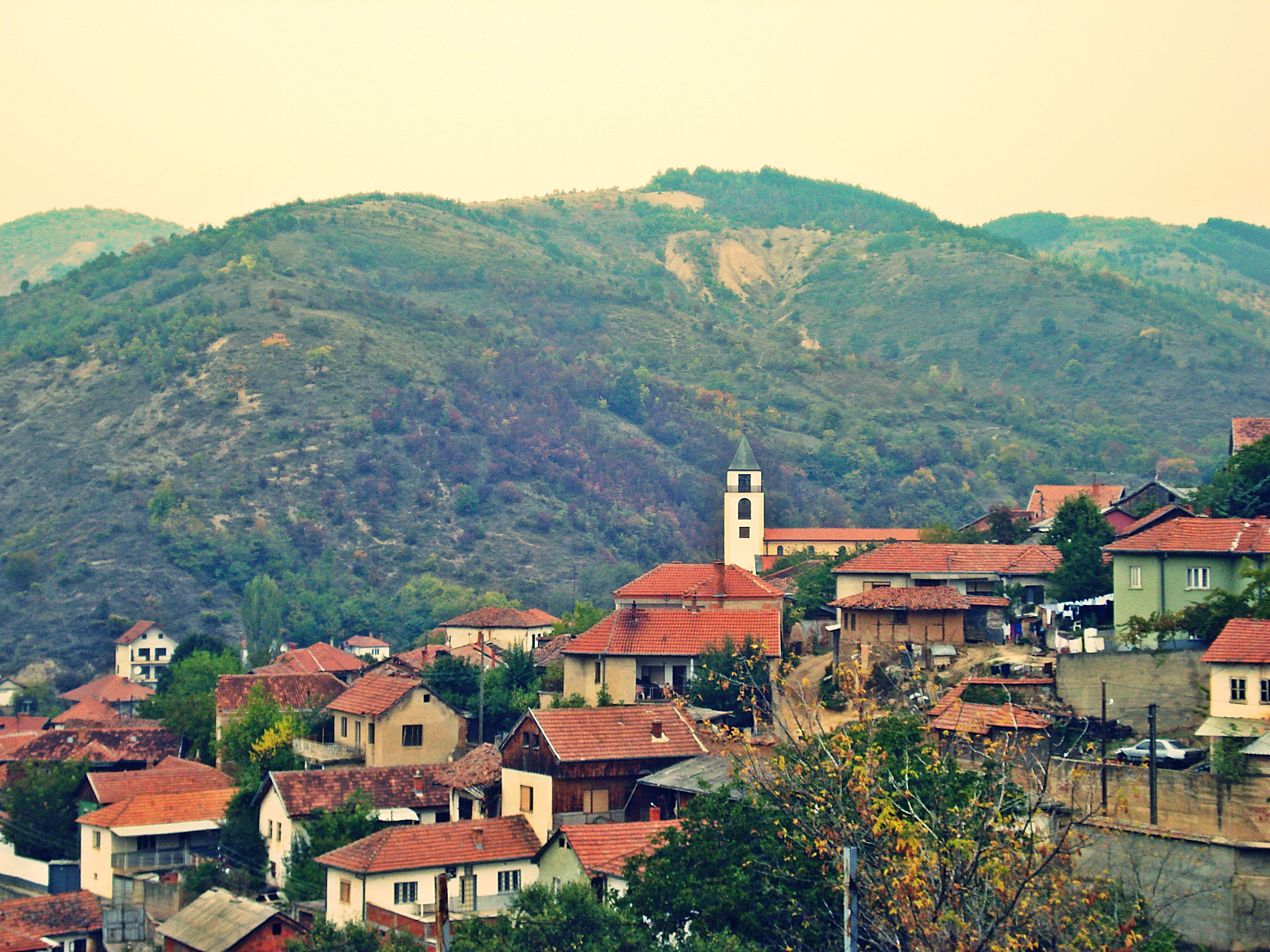
Janjevci, a town in Kosovo, with a large Croat community, 2010

Croatia has been a strong supporter of Kosovo’s integration into international organizations such as the European Union and the Council of Europe. Croatian officials, including Prime Minister Andrej Plenković and Foreign Minister Gordan Grlić Radman, have consistently expressed their backing for Kosovo’s EU membership and visa liberalization for Kosovo citizens. Croatia’s experience and support are seen as vital for Kosovo’s reform processes required for EU integration. Croatia has actively participated in various EU forums advocating for the acceleration of Kosovo’s membership process and has provided technical assistance to help Kosovo align with EU standards and regulations. Croatia’s support also includes promoting regional cooperation and stability, which are key aspects of Kosovo's path to full EU membership.

Croatia has played a proactive role in encouraging dialogue between Kosovo and Serbia, which is crucial for regional stability. Croatian leaders have urged both nations to continue talks aimed at normalizing relations, emphasizing the importance of this process for the broader European integration of the Western Balkans. Prime Minister Andrej Plenković has advocated for EU-mediated dialogue, highlighting mutual recognition as a key step towards peace. Croatia supports Kosovo's international integration and emphasizes the necessity of a stable and cooperative Balkan region for the economic and political advancement of all involved nations.

== Economic activity ==
Croatia and Kosovo have strong economic ties. Trade between the two countries increased by 23% in 2022. Both nations are keen on further enhancing their economic ties, with various forums and business exchanges taking place to facilitate this growth. Notable sectors include trade and investment, with Croatia being one of Kosovo’s significant trade partners. Additionally, Croatia's involvement in Kosovo's economic development includes investments in infrastructure projects and collaborations in technology and energy sectors. The mutual efforts to strengthen economic ties are reflected in the increasing number of joint ventures and partnerships between Croatian and Kosovar companies, demonstrating a robust economic relationship that benefits both nations.

== Diaspora ==
Kosovo is home to a community of around 300 ethnic Croats concentrated in the villages of Janjevo (Janjevci), Letnica, Šašare, Vrnavokolo and Vrnez. Their ancestors, Croat merchants and miners from Dubrovnik and Bosnia and Herzegovina, settled in the area rich in silver and lead mines in the 14th century. The number of Albanians in Croatia is much larger. According to 2011 census, 17,513 Albanians live in Croatia, mostly from Kosovo and Macedonia. Croatian and Albanian communities in both countries have fostered strong cultural and social ties, contributing to mutual understanding and strengthening the relationship between Kosovo and Croatia.

== See also ==
- Foreign relations of Croatia
- Foreign relations of Kosovo
- Kosovo-NATO relations
- Accession of Kosovo to the EU
- Croatia–Serbia relations
