= Alojzije Palić =

Kosovar Croat martyr (1877–1913)

Blessed Alojzije Palić Luigj Paliq OFM
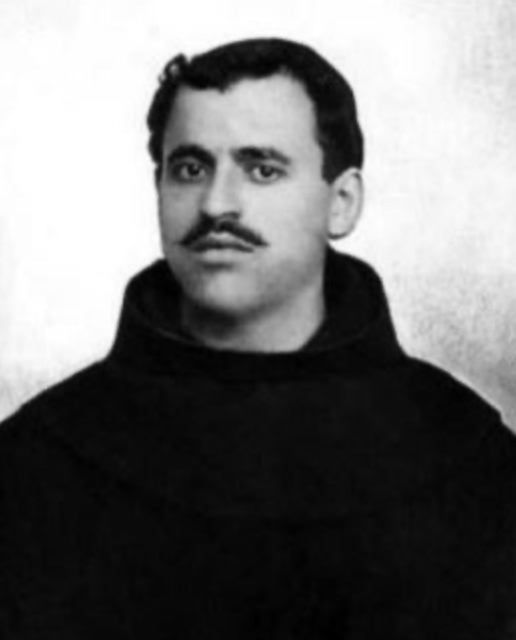
- Photograph of Palić in July 1902

Personal details
- Born: Matej Palić; 20 February 1877 or 14 April 1878 Janjevo, Kosovo Vilayet, Ottoman Empire
- Died: 7 March 1913 (aged 34 or 36) Janoš near Đakovica, Kingdom of Montenegro

Sainthood
- Venerated in: Catholic Church
- Beatified: 16 November 2024; Shkodër, Albania by Marcello Semeraro (on behalf of Pope Francis)

Alojzije Palić OFM (Latin: Aloysius Mathaeus Paliq, Albanian: Luigj Paliq; 1877 or 1878 – 7 March 1913) was a Kosovo Croat or Kosovo Albanian Franciscan, Catholic priest, and martyr that was murdered by Montenegrin soldiers in 1913. He was beatified in Shkodër on 16 November 2024, together with don Ivan Gazula (1893–1927).

== Biography ==
He was born as Matej Palić in Janjevo to Janjevci family of Toma and Paulina Palić (née Đurić). He enters Franciscan novitiate on 23 Septembre 1896, taking religious name Alojzije. He studied philosophy in Shkodër and theology in Bologne and Parma. Palić took his lifelong vows on 8 December 1901, and was ordained a priest on 20 April 1902, in Parma.

Upon completing his studies, he returned to his province, where he was a parish vicar in the Archdiocese of Skhoder from 1905 to 1907. He later served as a parish priest in Baz and Đakovica, where he was also rector of the hospice, and from 1911 to 1913 in Peć and Glođane.

As a parson in Glođane, he opposed the forced conversion of Muslims in the surrounding villages by the Orthodox. For this, he was arrested on March 4, 1913, and spent several days in prison in Peć, where he was beaten and tortured, and forced to renounce his priesthood and Catholic faith in order to convert to the Orthodoxy. On 7 March 1913, even before the trial, he was killed by Montenegrin soldiers near the village of Janoš (Janosh, Gjakova, present-day Kosovo). He was buried immediately, and only after four months was his body found and transferred to the church in Zjum, in southwestern Kosovo.

== Beatification ==
The process for his beatification began in 2002 in the Diocese of Shkodër, within the cause of 40 martyrs killed out of hatred for the Catholic faith from 1913 to 1974 in Albania. A separate process for Fr. Alojzije continued on 9 March 2012 in Rome. Pope Francis authorized the Prefect of the Dicastery for the Causes of Saints, Cardinal Marcel Semerar, to publish a decree on the martyrdom out of hatred for the faith of the Servant of God Fr. Alojzije Palić on 20 June 2024.
