= Papakha =

Traditional wool hat from Caucasus

A Caucasian wearing a papakha

The papakha (Note: Abkhaz: нарҭаа рхылҧа, Adyghe: паӀо, romanized: pa'o; Armenian: փափախ, romanized: p‘ap‘akh, Armenian pronunciation: [pʰɑˈpʰɑχ]; Azerbaijani: papaq, پاپاق, lit. 'Hat', Chechen: холхазан-куй, romanized: holhazan-kuy; Georgian: ფაფახი, papakhi, [pʰapʰaχi], Ingush: кий/элтар-кий, Ossetian: Уæлдзарм худ, Russian: папа́ха, romanized: papakha, IPA: [pɐˈpaxə]) is a sheepskin hat worn by men throughout the Caucasus and also in uniformed military regiments in the region and beyond.

== Etymology ==
The word papakha is of Turkic origin (papakh). The word papak is also a component of the ethnonym of a Turkic group of uncertain relation: the "Karapapak" (literally "black papakh" in the Azerbaijani language).

== Styles ==
There are two different Caucasian papakhas. One, called a papaha, is a high fur hat, usually made of karakul sheepskin. The hat has the general appearance of a cylinder with one open end and is set upon the head in such a way as to have the brim touch the temples. Some examples have ear-flaps which can be folded up when not in use. The other style is called a kubanka, and is similar to the papaha, but shorter and without ear-flaps.

== Prevalence ==
Papaqs are very important to mountainous peoples of the Caucasus, where a man's hat is considered a very important part of his identity. Papakhi are donned by the Circassians, Chechens, Dagestanis, and other Caucasian tribes. Papakhas are also donned in Georgia mostly worn in mountainous regions of Pshavi, Khevi, Mtiuleti, and Tusheti. In 1855, after the campaigns in the Caucasus Mountains, the Papakha was introduced in the Russian army as an official part of the uniform for the Cossacks, and later for the rest of the cavalry. Papaq is also very common in Azerbaijan, Armenia, Turkmenistan, Uzbekistan.

== Russian and Soviet army uniforms ==
Shortly after the Russian Revolution of 1917, papakhas were removed from the new Red Army uniform because of their association with the old Tsarist regime and the fact that many Cossack regiments of the Tsarist army fought against the Bolsheviks. During the Russian Civil War, many Bolshevik cavalrymen and officers (like Vasily Chapayev) wore papakhas or kubankas because many of them were Cossacks and the hat had been part of the cavalryman's uniform.

Papakhas became part of the uniform again in 1935, but in 1941, were reserved exclusively for full colonels, generals and marshals, thus becoming a symbol of status and high rank. Much later, during Andrei Grechko's tenure as a Defence Minister, the Navy followed suit, introducing their own distinct version resembling a smallish "kubanka" with a visor, which was nicknamed "шапка с ручкой" ("the hat with a handle") by the troops.

In 1994, they were once again removed from military use. Allegedly this was by request of the wearers, who found the hat inefficient. (As the papakha is a relatively short hat that does not protect the ears well, it might be well suited to the mild climate of the Caucasus, but not to lower temperatures elsewhere). The act of removing the papakhas was seen in some quarters as an attempt by the Boris Yeltsin regime to abandon earlier Soviet traditions and symbolically demonstrate the country's commitment to a new political course. In 2005 however, papakhas were reinstated. Papakhas have also been used by the Russian backed Luhansk People's Militia in both the War in Donbas and the wider Russo-Ukrainian War.

== Contemporary papakha ==
The Papakha's heritage comes from Central Asia and the Caucasus and is worn across the entire region, including Azerbaijan, Georgia, Armenia, and North Caucasus, as well as Russia and Ukraine, Turkey, Chinese Turkistan, Uzbekistan, Turkmenistan (called telpek) and also Persia.

== Gallery ==
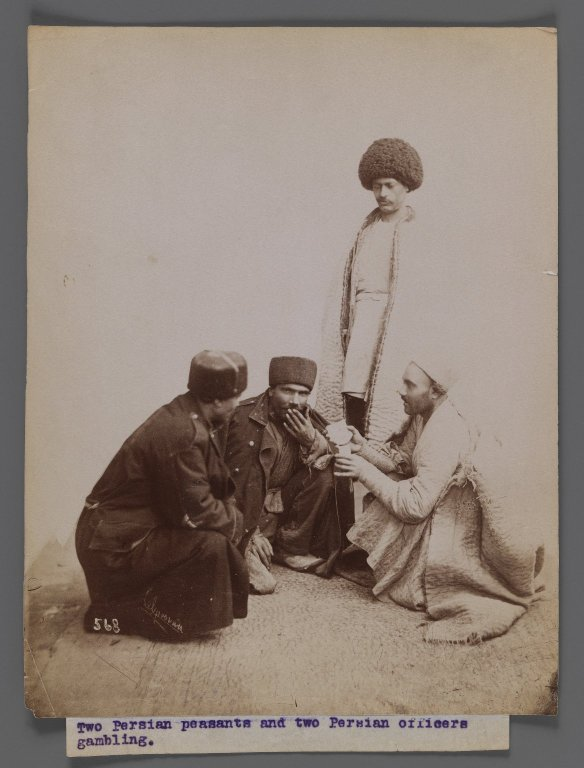
Two Persian peasants and two Persian officers gambling, between 1876 and 1933; the standing peasant is wearing a papakha. Brooklyn Museum

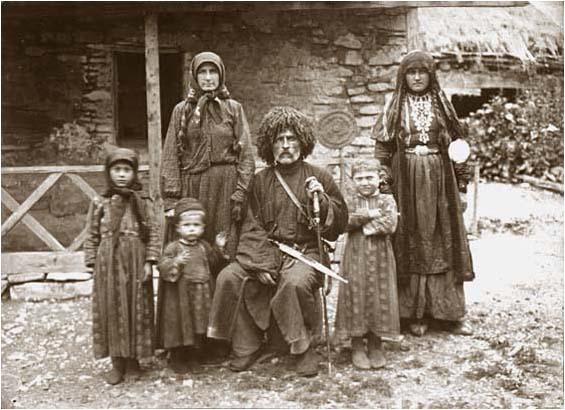
Georgian poet and writer Vazha-Pshavela (centre) wearing a Georgian papakha with his family

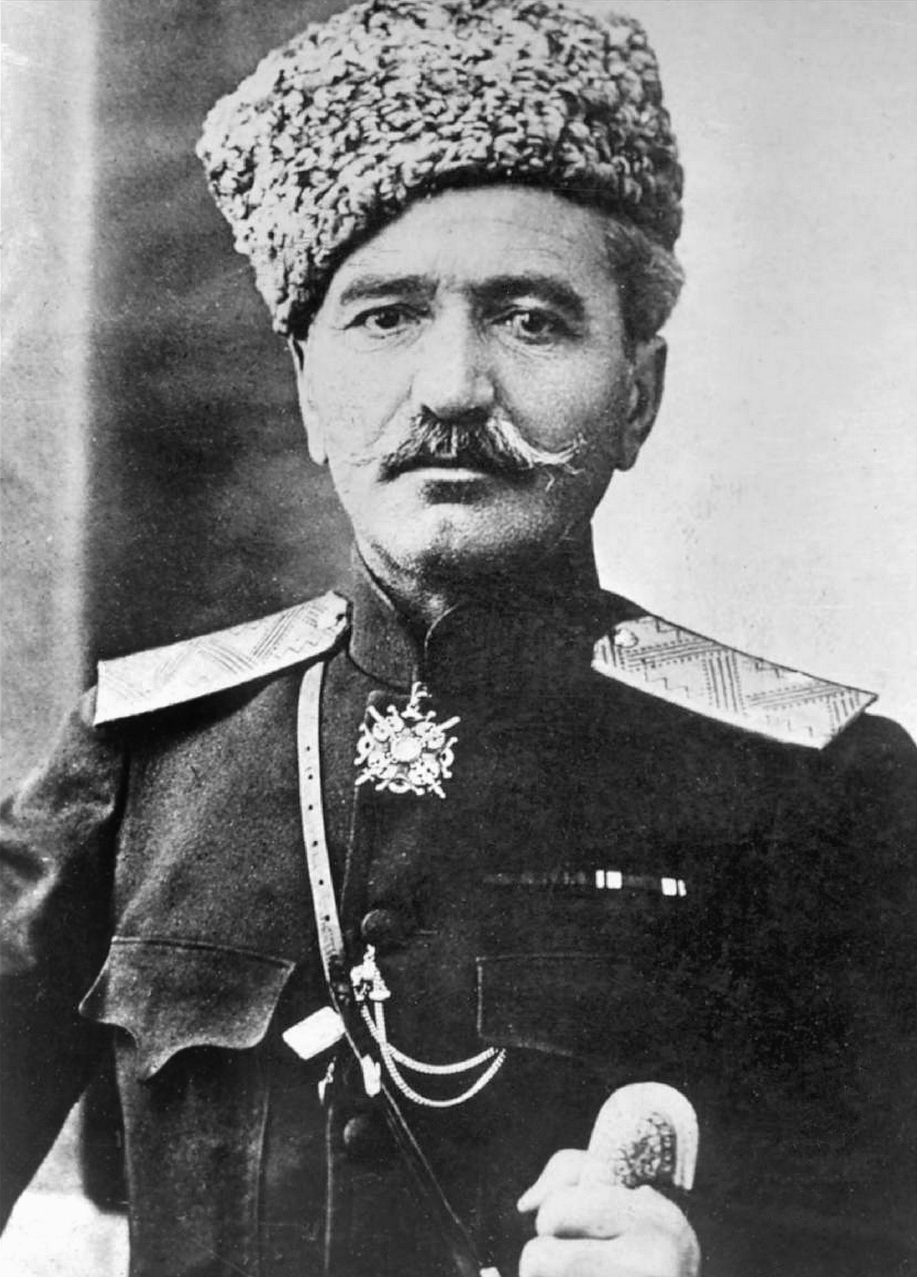
Armenian military commander Andranik wearing a papakha

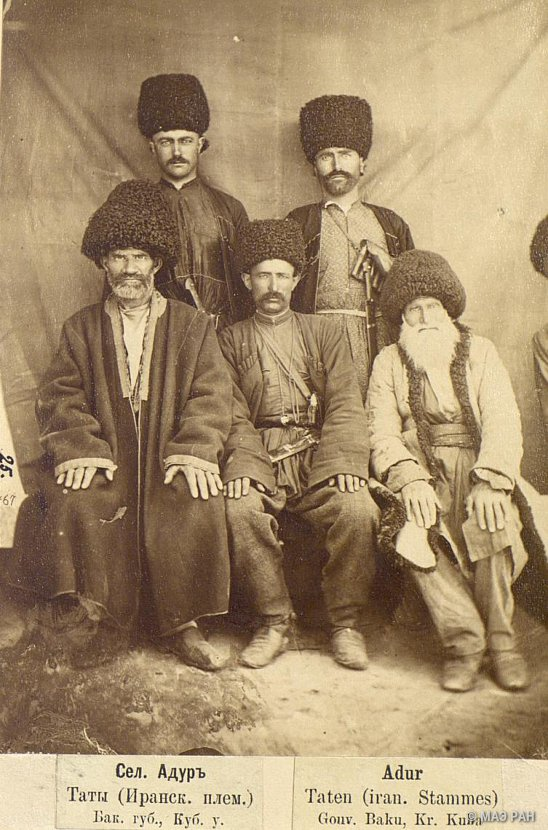
Tat men wearing papakha

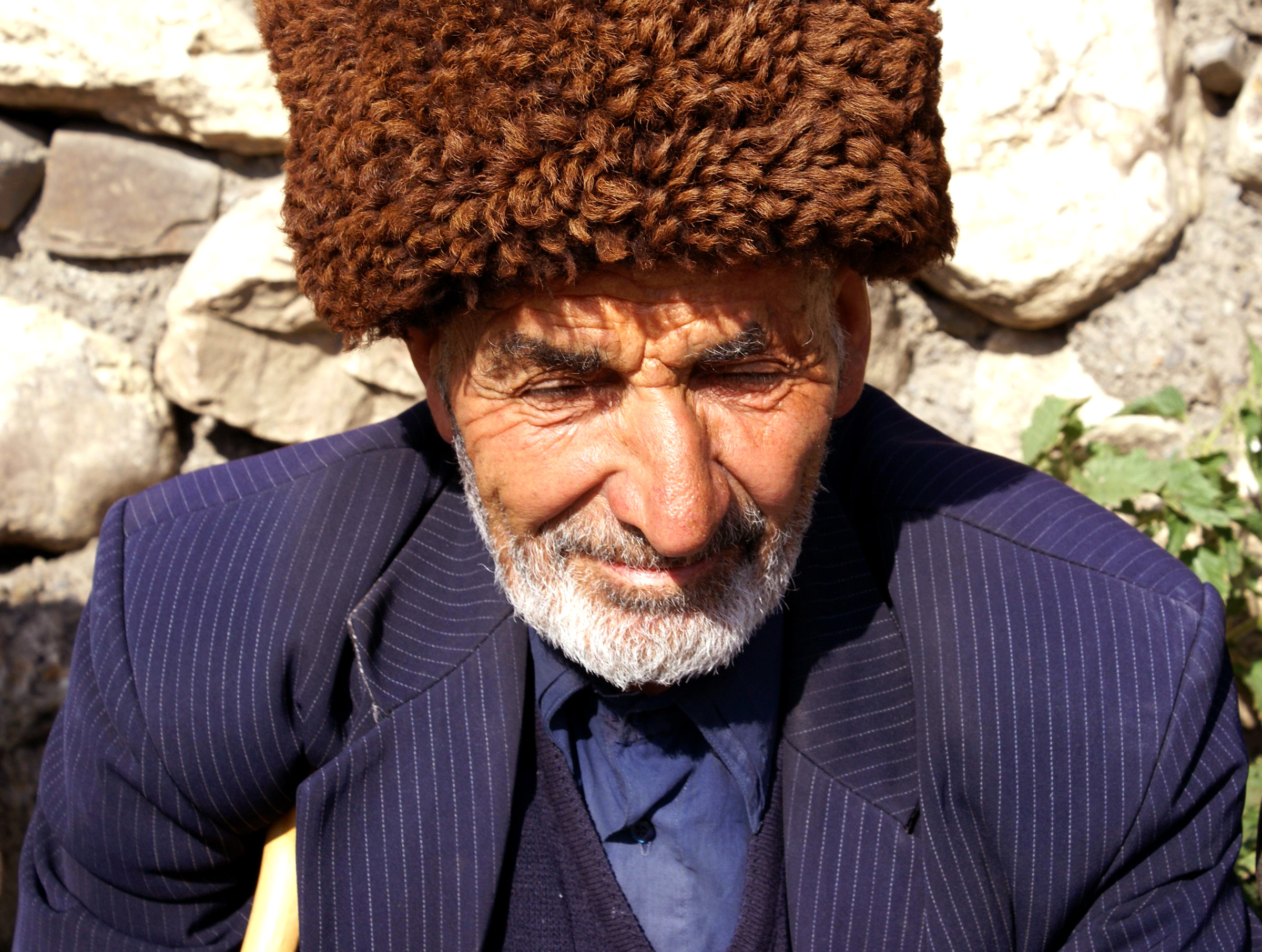
A man from Khinalug with a papakha

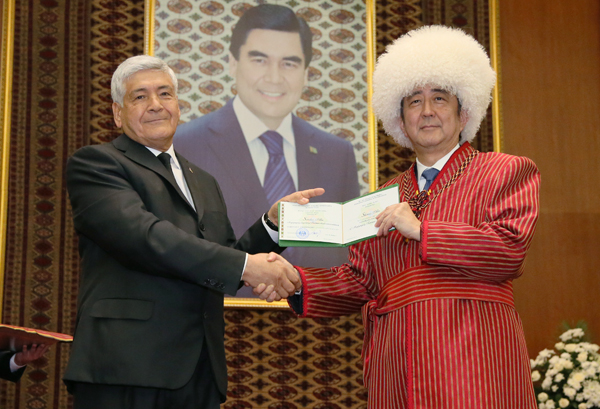
Japanese Prime Minister Shinzo Abe (right) wearing a papakha (telpek) next to rector of the Magtymguly Turkmen State University Gurtnyýaz Nurlyýewiç Hanmyradow (left)

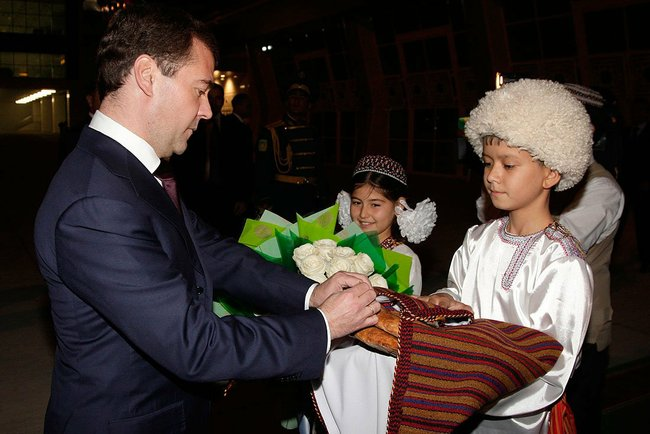
Turkmen boy wearing a papakha (telpek) with Russian President Dmitry Medvedev at Turkmenbashi International Airport

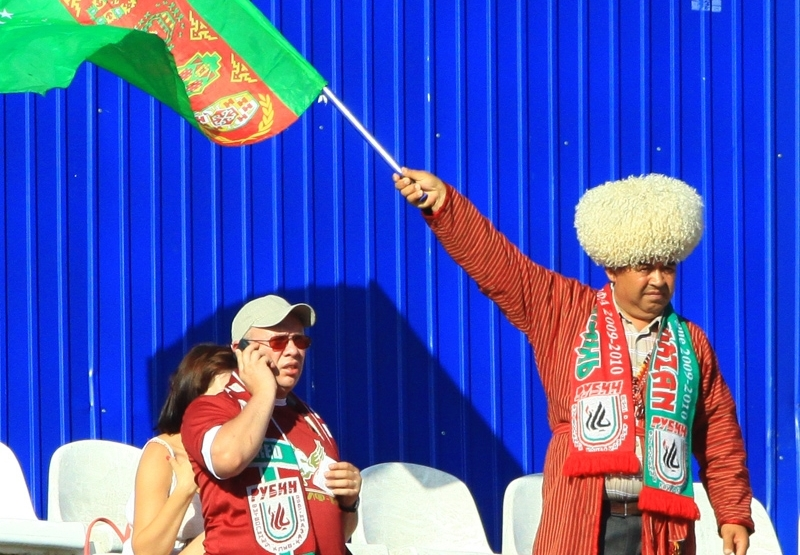
Turkmen football fan with a papakha (right)

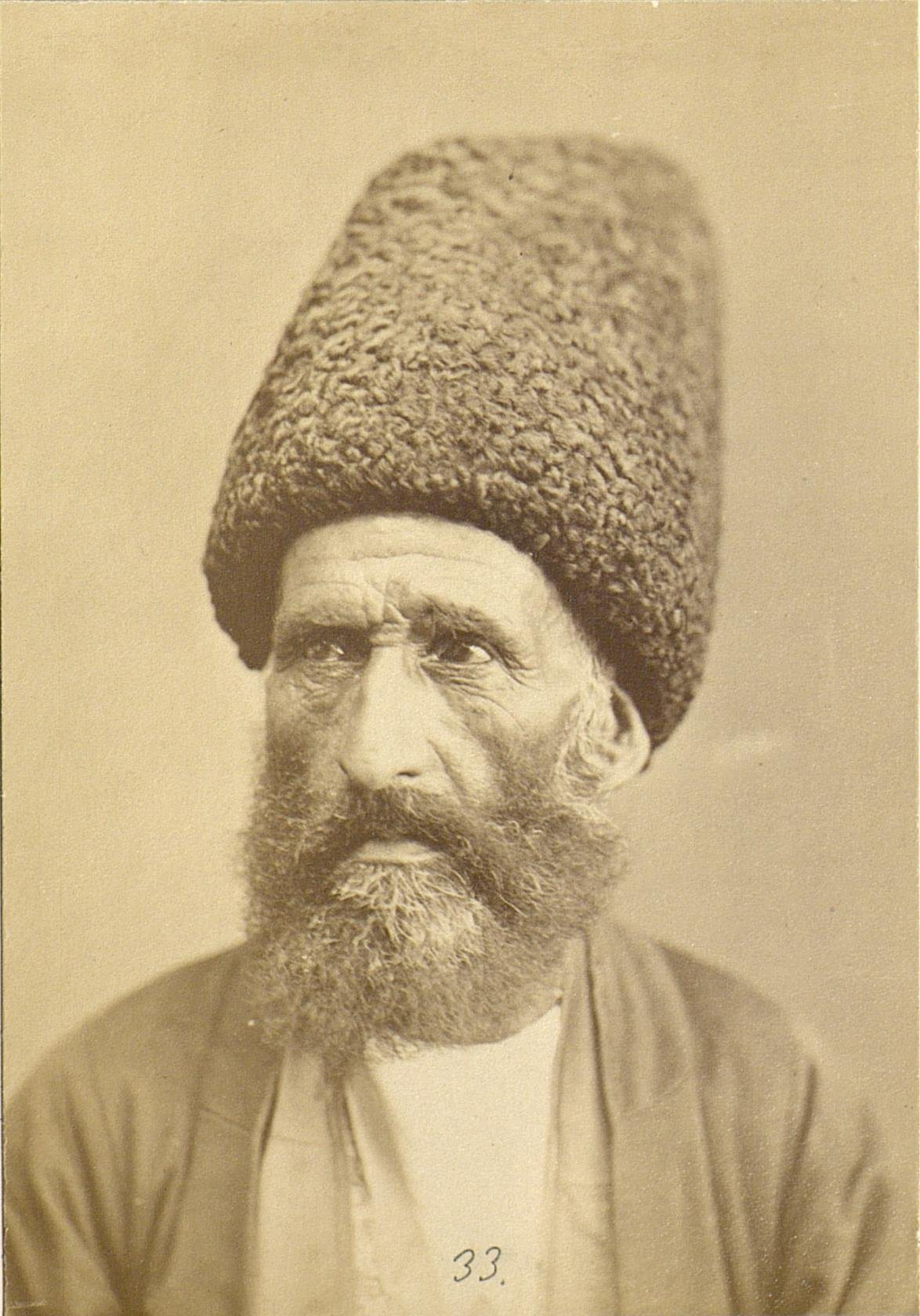
Azerbaijani old man in Papakh

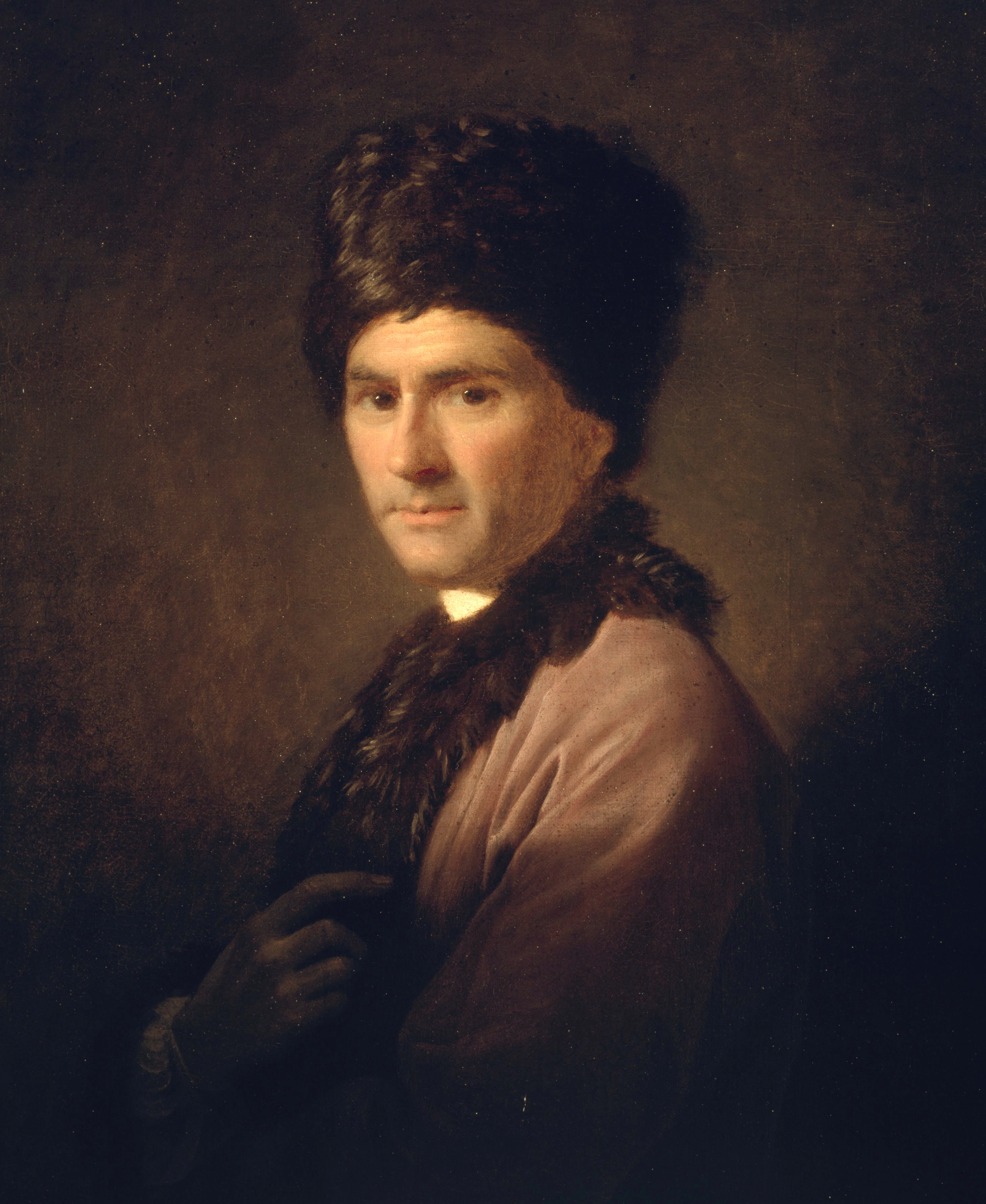
1766 portrait of Rousseau wearing an Armenian papakha and costume, Allan Ramsay

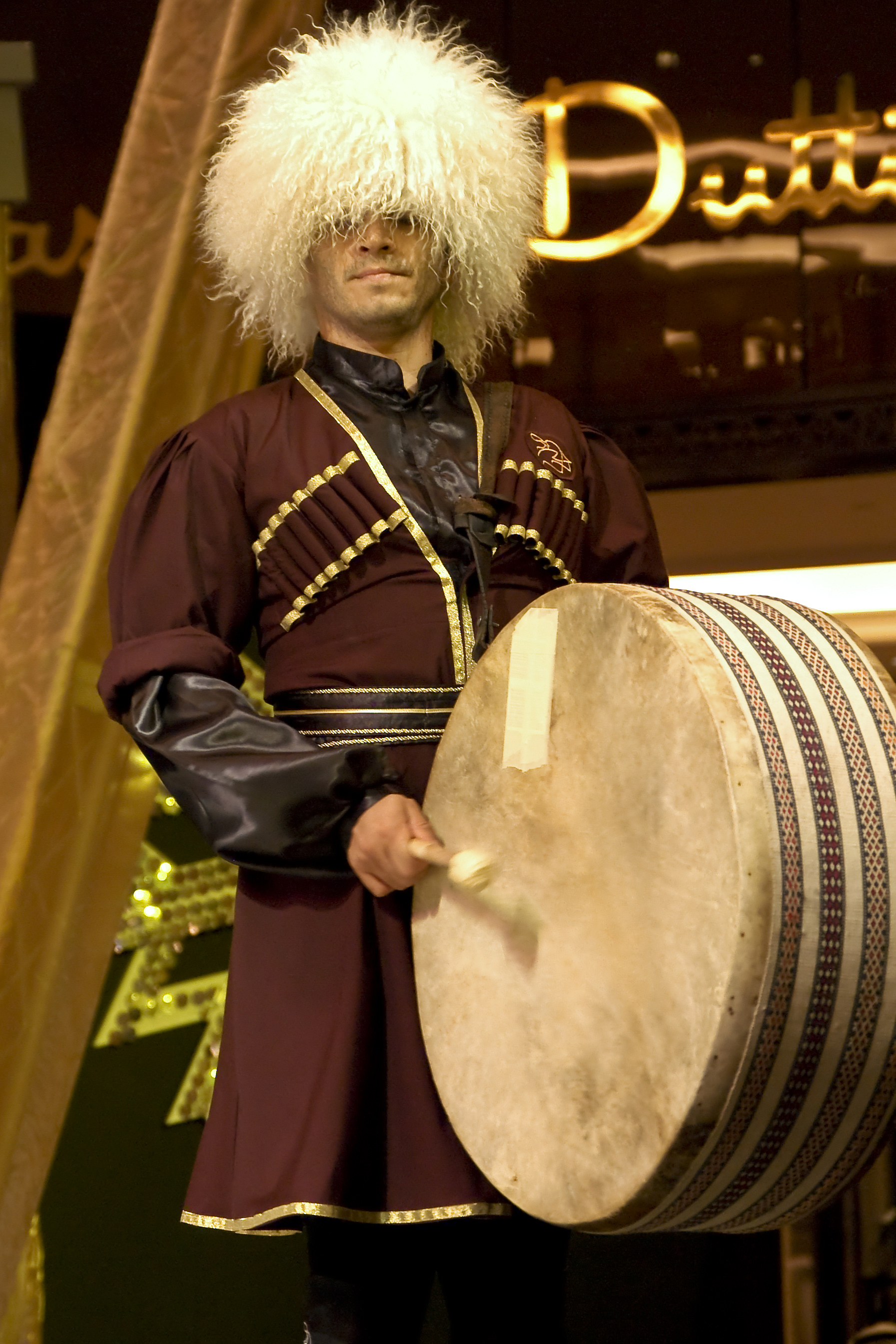
Traditional Azerbaijani clothing and musical instruments

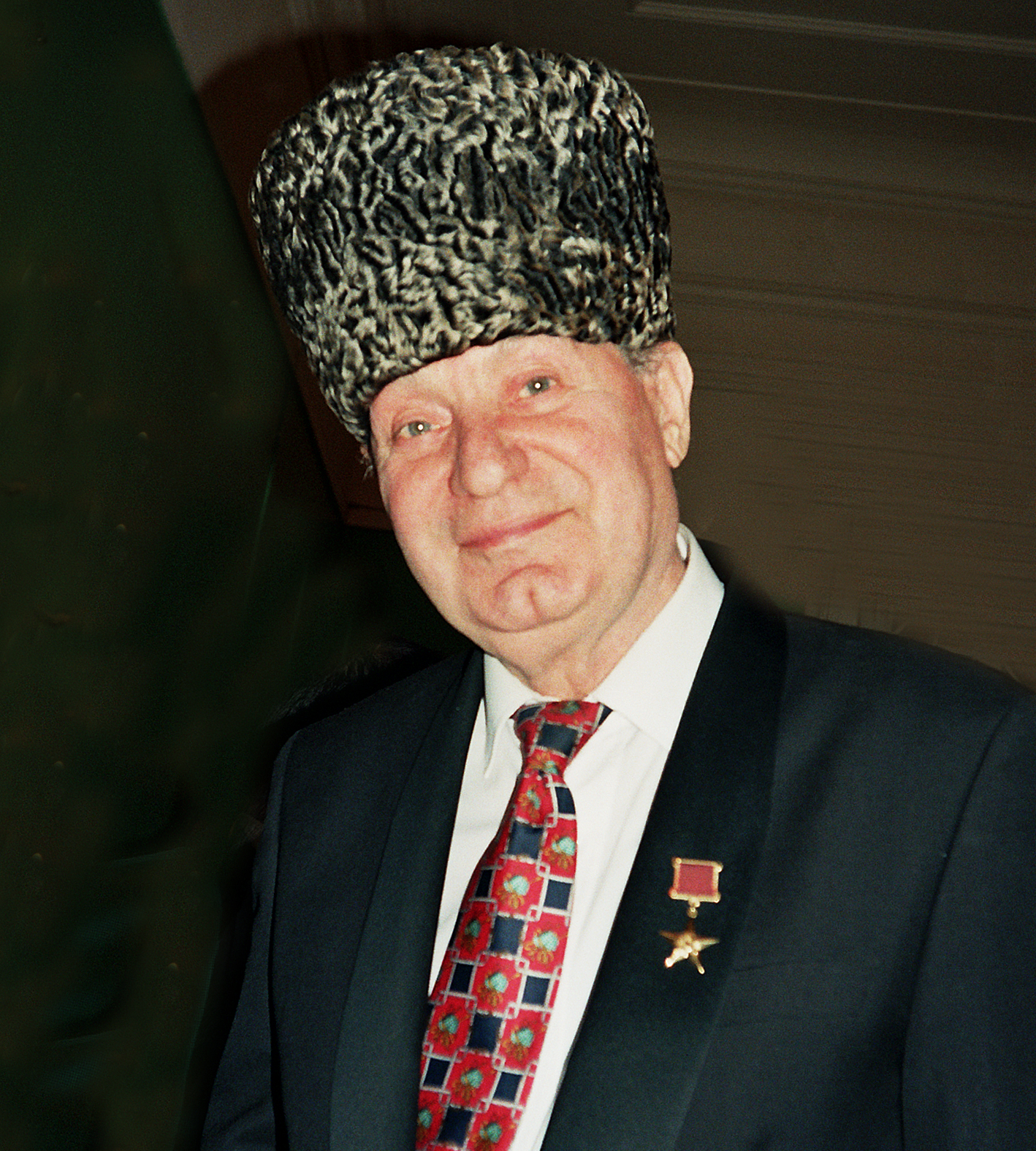
Makhmud Esambayev, known for his papakha, which he referred to as his "crown"

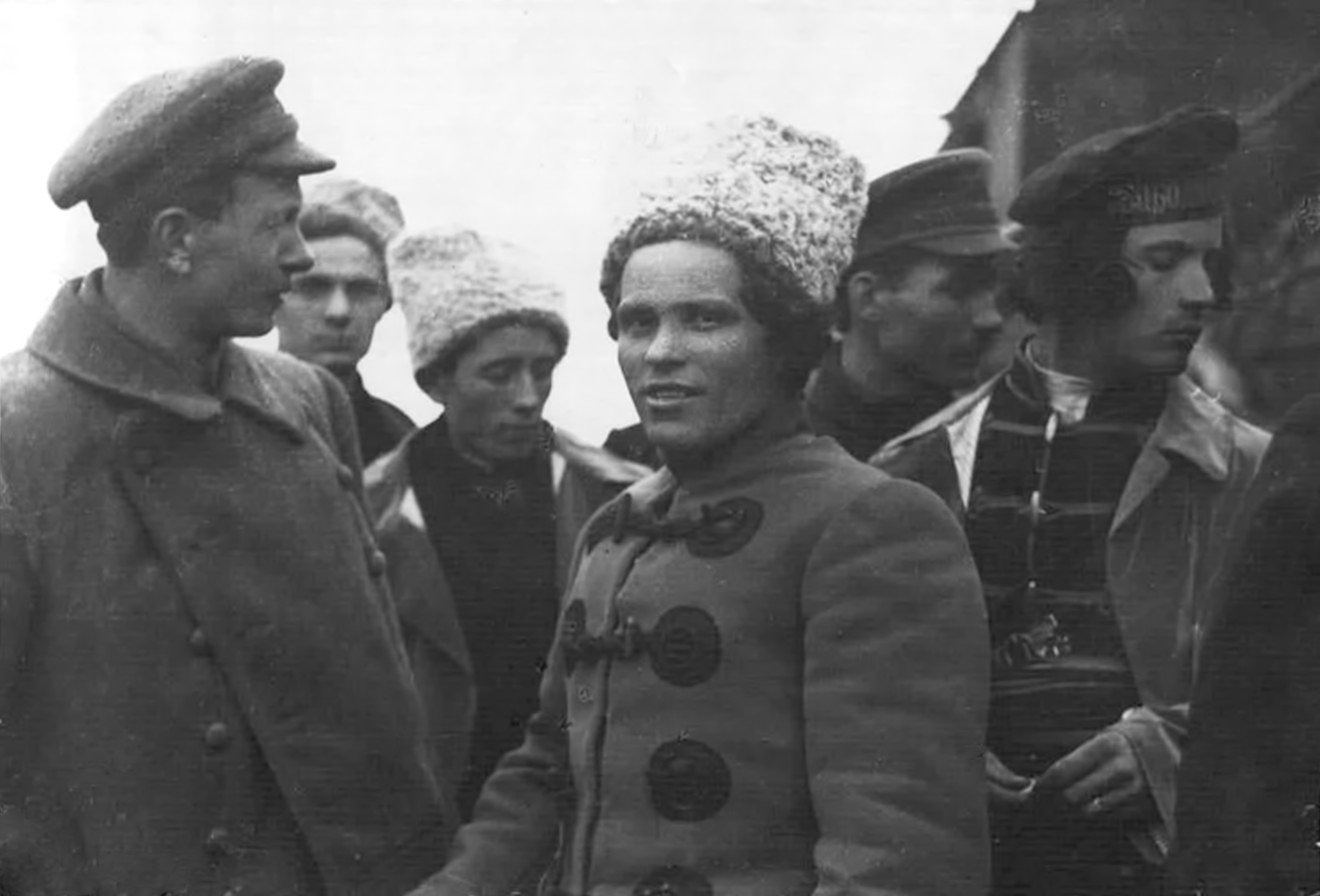
Nestor Makhno with members of the Revolutionary Insurgent Army of Ukraine, wearing his signature Papakha.

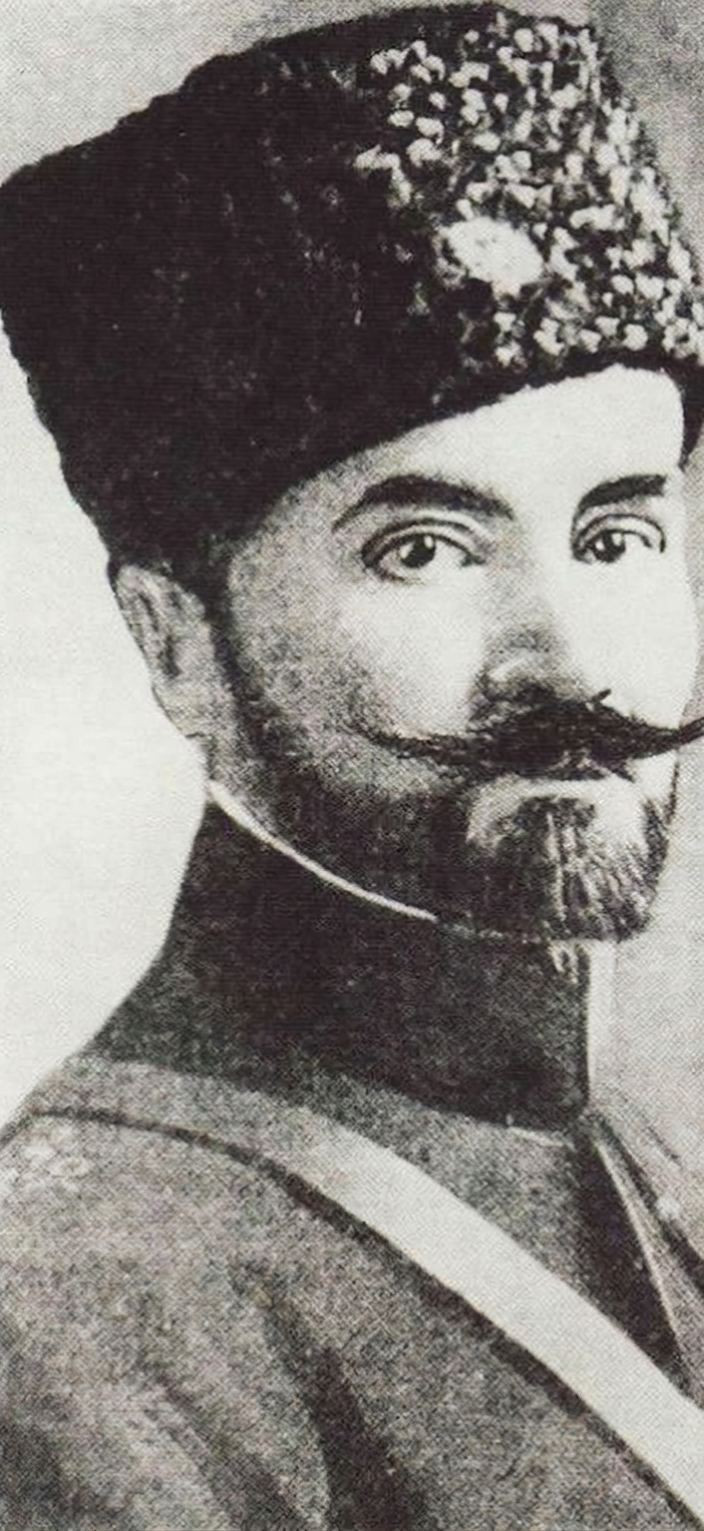
General Torkom, commander of the "Armenian Legion" of the Greek Army during the Greco-Turkish War, wearing a papakha

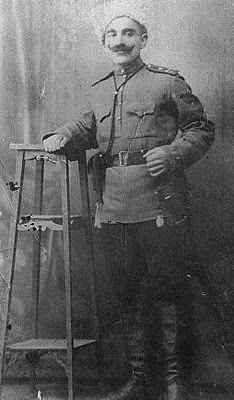
Christos Adamidis, Greek officer of the Greek Caucasus Division of the Russian Imperial Army, wearing a papakha

== See also ==
- Busby
- List of hat styles
- List of fur headgear
- Kalpak
- Karakul (hat)
- Ushanka, Russian fur hat with "ear flaps"
