= Telpek =

Traditional Turkmen sheepskin headgear

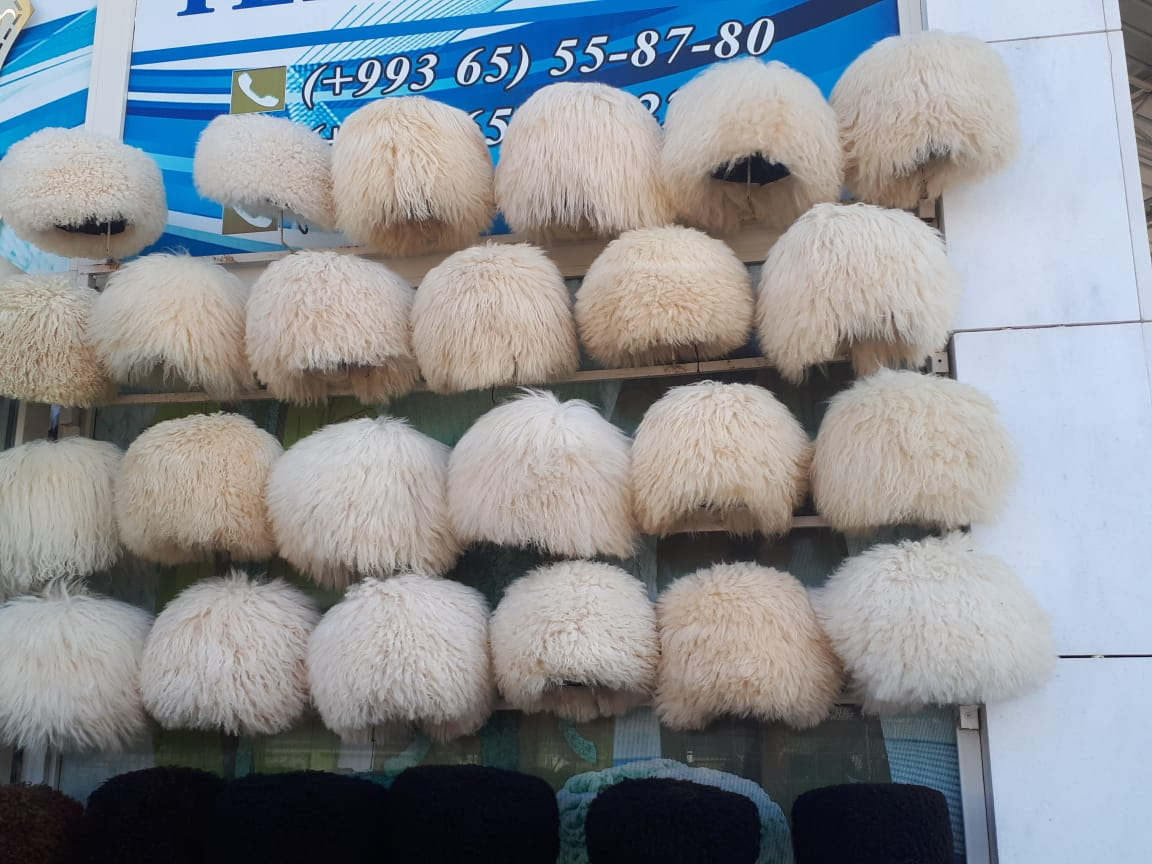
Telpeks in Turkmenistan

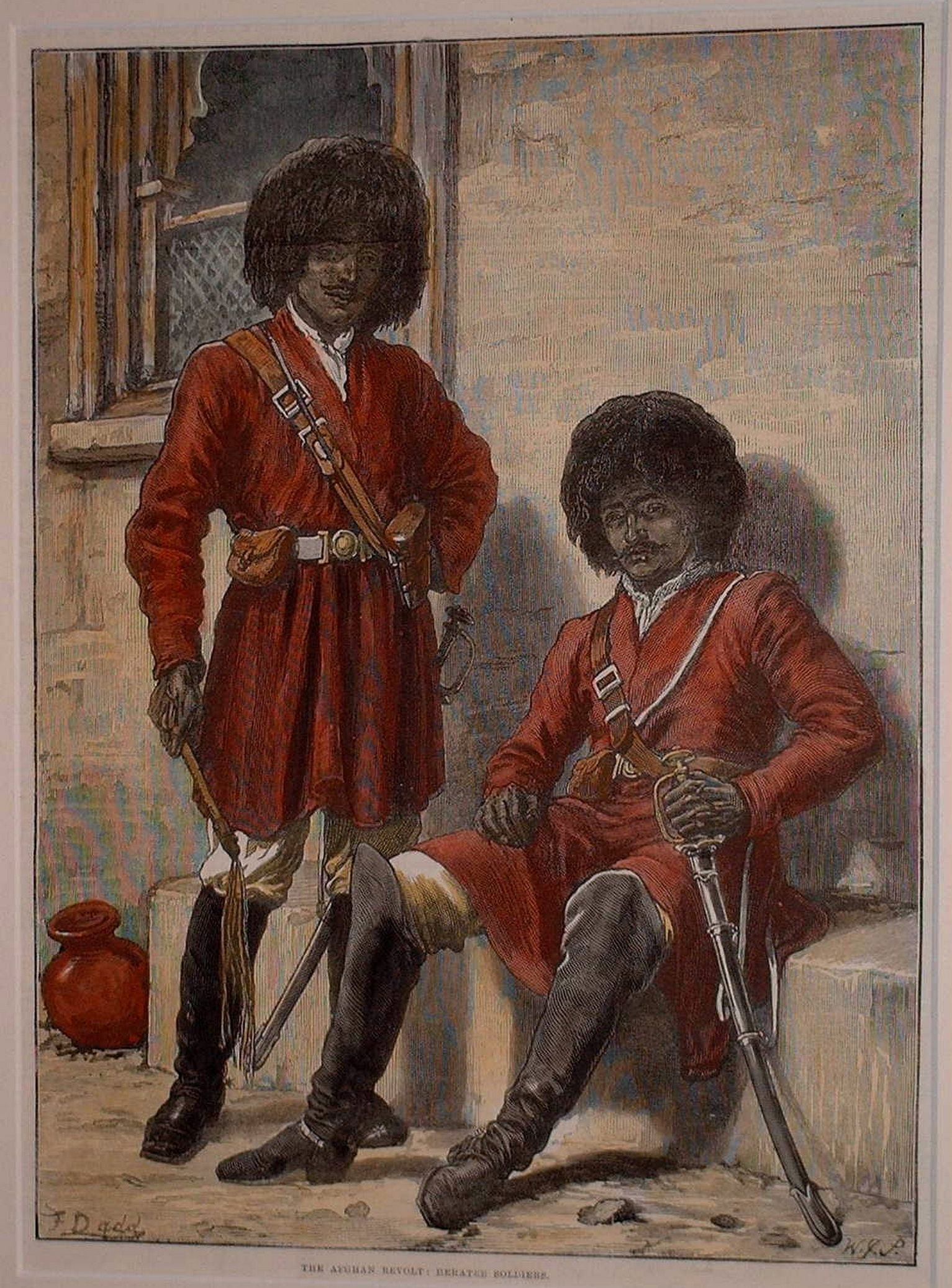
Afghan soldiers from Herat in 1879 wearing the telpek as part of their uniform

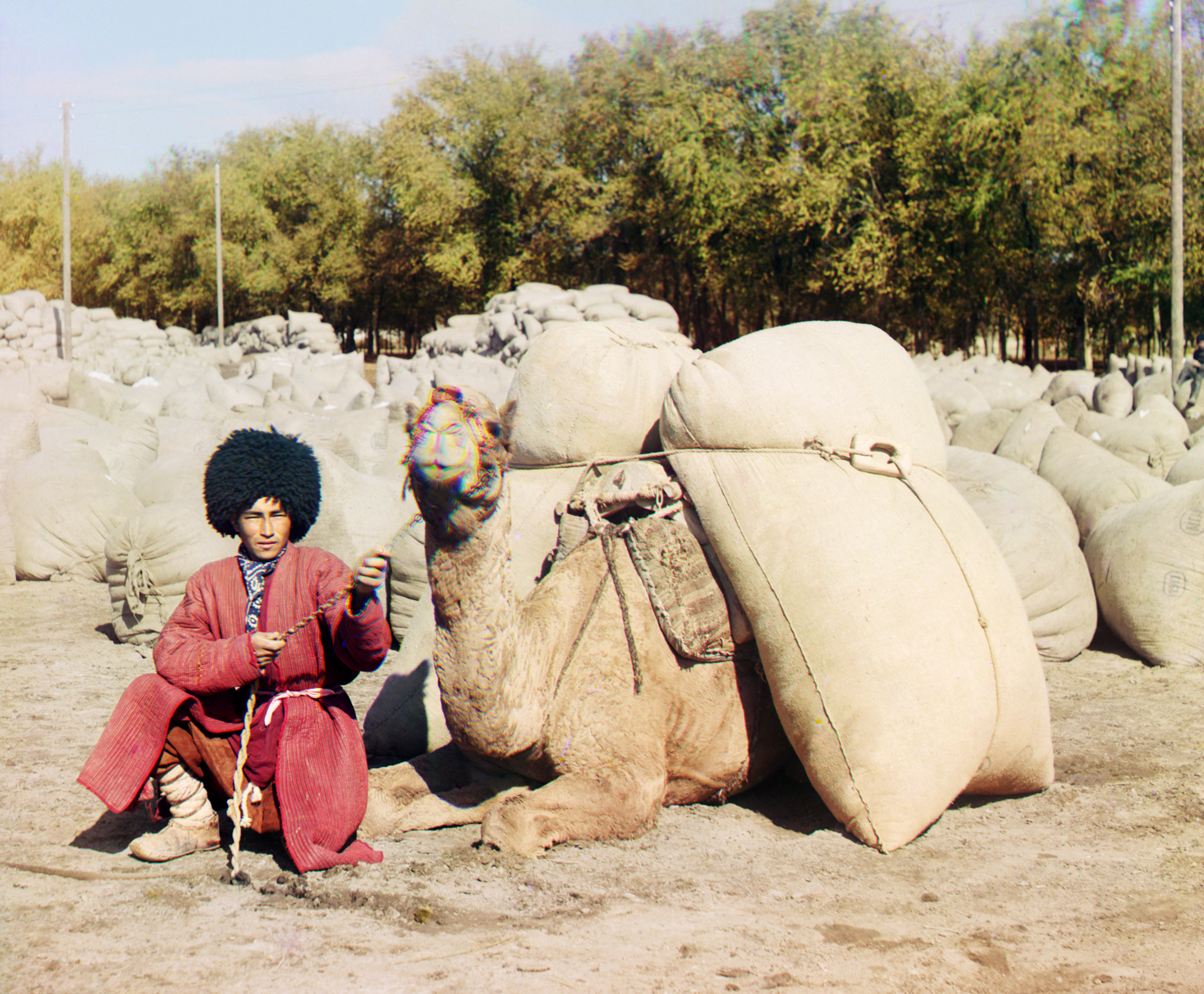
Turkmen man wearing a black telpek (c. 1910)

The telpek (Turkmen: telpek) is an item of headgear that is part of the traditional clothing of the Turkmens. It is widespread in Turkmenistan but is also popular with the Turkmens of Afghanistan and Iran. In Afghanistan in particular, it is also worn by the non-Turkmen population, such as the Pashtuns and the Persian-speaking population in the west of the country.

== Design and making ==
The basis of the telpek is a cap made of soft leather. This is covered on the outside with sheepskin, the colour varying between white, black and dark brown depending on the type of sheepskin used. The tanning, preparation and stitching of the sheepskin is a complex process that takes a few weeks in total.

In order to avoid deformation of the relatively flexible headgear, there are specially made balls made of mulberry wood on which the telpek can be placed.

Making of telpeks requires the use of manual force. In different regions of Turkmenistan, there are entire families who are engaged in sewing this traditional headdress. The process of sewing telpeks is a rather time-consuming task, so family members of different ages take part in its manufacture.

Well-fed and healthy sheep have a high-quality skin, it is in such cases that the fleece is easily processed, therefore sheepskin dressing is the first stage in the process of sewing a telpek. The skin is spread out and generously sprinkled with salt, folded into an envelope and left for several days. Salt acts as a preservative and fixative for the fur, then the salt is peeled off, the skin is washed and dried in the shade. After drying, the skin must be softened, for which it is smeared with sour kefir or milk, and again it is aged for 1-2 weeks. The craftsmen, who are convinced of the complete dressing of the sheepskin, wash it several times and begin to scrape it with a smooth stone. As a result of this process, the fleece is ready for further work.

== Distribution ==
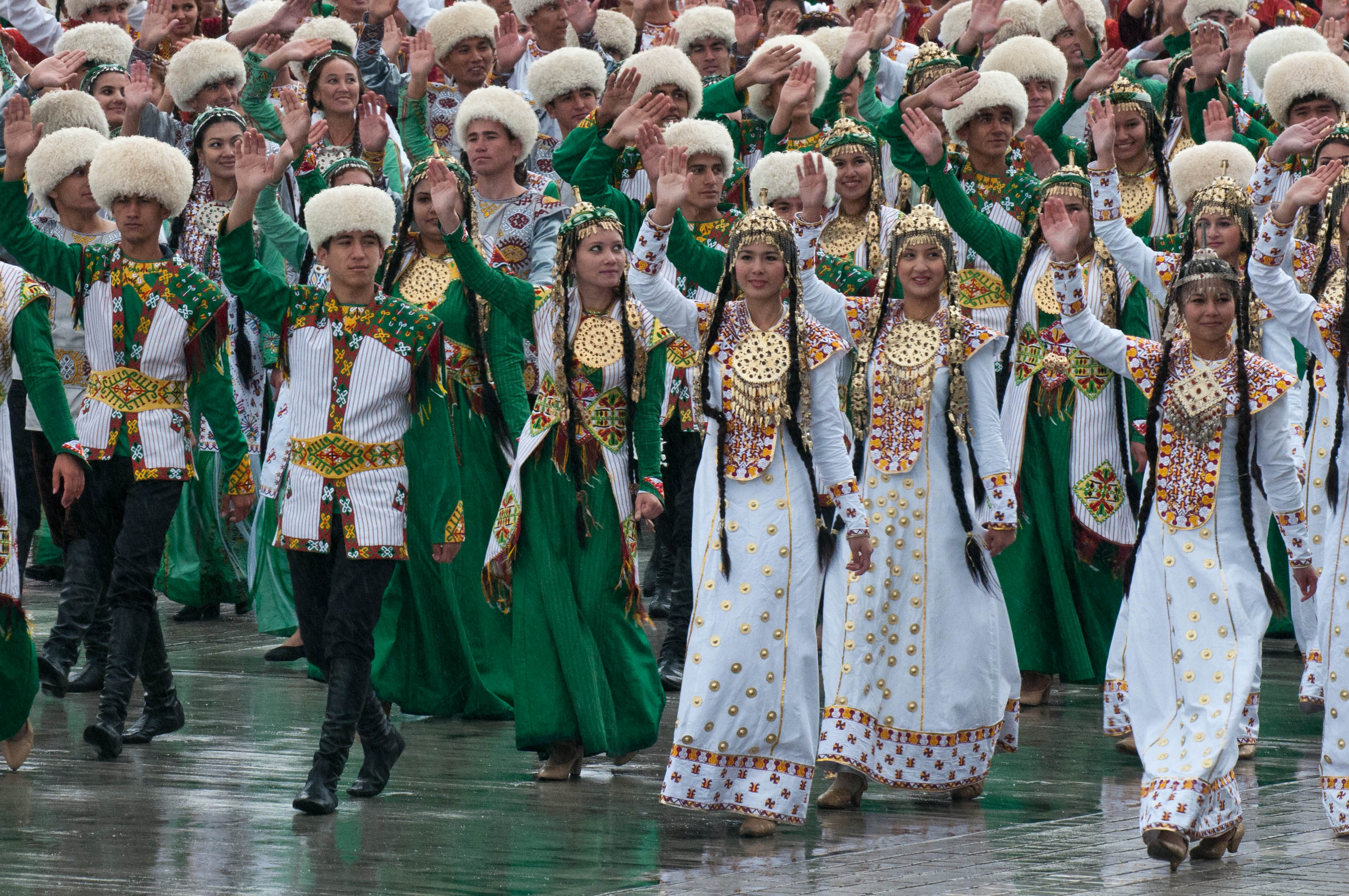
Parade on the 20th anniversary of the independence of Turkmenistan in 2011, with men wearing the telpek

The telpek is still very popular with the rural population, especially away from the larger cities of Turkmenistan. The practical advantages of the traditional headgear also play a role in this, as it has insulating properties that are of high importance in Turkmenistan, where there are sometimes extreme temperatures in both the positive and negative ranges.

In addition, the telpek is now understood as a symbol of Turkmen identity and culture and is worn, for example, on official occasions. Tourists are also often interested in traditional Turkmen clothing and the telpek. Younger Turkmen tend to wear white telpeks, while older individuals tend to wear grey or black telpeks.

== See also ==
- List of fur headgear
