= Pal Dodaj =

Albanian priest and scholar

- Born: 3 September 1880; Janjevo, Lipjan, Sanjak of Prizren, Ottoman Empire (now Kosovo)
- Died: 5 February 1951 (aged 70); Shkodër, Albania
- Occupations: Catholic priest, teacher and translator

Pal Dodaj (3 September 1880 – 5 February 1951) was an Albanian Catholic priest, teacher, translator and philosoph from Kosovo.

== Biography ==
He was born in Janjevo, in the Vilayet of Kosovo, baptized with the name Kolë, as the son of Mash and Prenda Paliq. He went to Shkodër as a child to be educated by the Franciscan Fathers. He began his studies at the College of Troshan, while he completed his novitiate and philosophical and theological studies in Florence, Italy. There, on July 19, 1902, he celebrated his First Mass, to immediately return to his homeland. He began his work as a professor of philosophy first in Troshan and then at the "Illyricum" College in Shkodër as a professor of Canon Law and Morals. In the hierarchy of the Order, he was also appointed as Guardian and later, the first Albanian provincial superior of the Albanian Franciscan Province. He turned the Franciscan Assembly of Rubik into a shelter of protection for the persecuted. It is said that one of the refugees was Ahmet Bey Zogolli in his youth. He was arrested by the authorities of the communist regime on November 8, 1946 and sentenced to death. His sentence was commuted to life imprisonment and he later died in prison.

== Works ==
He published in the magazine Hylli i Dritës and in many other foreign ones. He was a regular contributor to the Vatican newspaper L'Osservatore Romano.

Also about the situation at that time, there is an exchange of more than 200 letters with Gjergj Fishta, where a multitude of topics are discussed.

His main work that he left is his personal diary, parts of which were also published in the temporary Hylli i Dritës after the '90s. The diary is handwritten in Italian and a little Albanian. It is kept in notebooks and notebooks of various formats, starting in 1907 and ending in 1943.

In 1941, in collaboration with Zef Skiroi, he translated the Kanuni i Lekë Dukagjinit, which was published by the Academy of Arts and Sciences in Rome in 1941.
