= Janjevci =

Ethnic Croat community in Kosovo

Janjevët or Kroatët e Kosovës (Albanian) Janjevci or Kosovski Hrvati (Croatian)
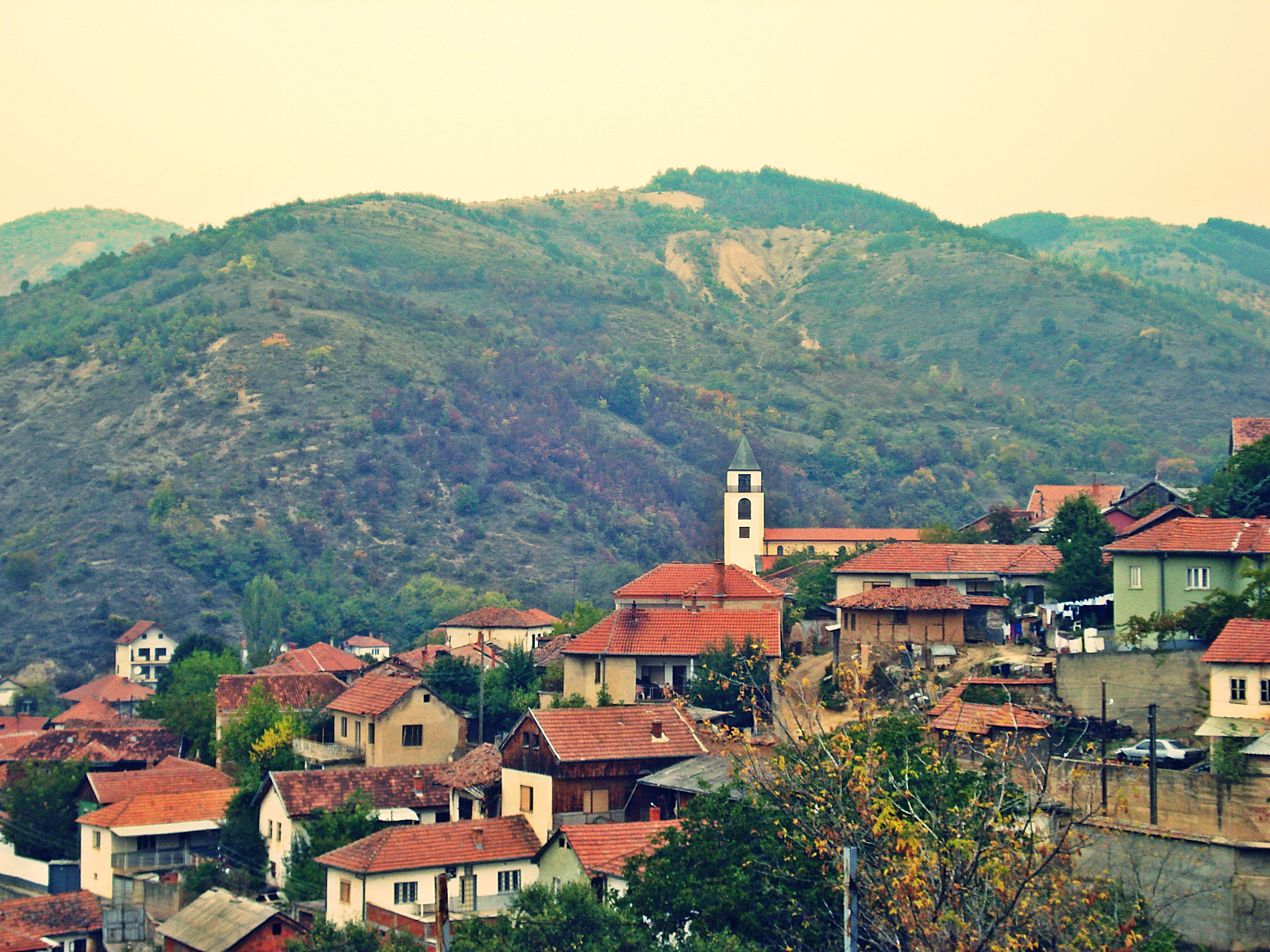
- Town of Janjevo, the traditional centre of this community

Total population
- Unknown

Regions with significant populations
- Kosovo: ca. 400 people (2011); Croatia: ca. 966 families (2002 est.)

Languages
- Janjevo–Lepenica idiom of Croatian (Prizren–Timok dialect); Albanian

Religion
- Roman Catholicism

Related ethnic groups
- Croats

Janjevci (pronounced [ˈjaːɲeʋtsi], Albanian: Janjevët, Croatian: Janjevci), Kosovo Croats (Albanian: Kroatët e Kosovës, Croatian: Kosovski Hrvati) or Janjevci Croats (Croatian: Janjevski Hrvati) are a Croat community in Kosovo, inhabiting the town of Janjevo and surrounding villages near Pristina, as well as villages centered on Letnica near Vitia (Šašare, Vrnez, and Vrnavokolo), who are also known as Letničani. They are not officially recognised as a national minority group.

They are considered among the oldest of the Croatian diaspora communities.

== Identity and culture ==
The Janjevci, an ethnic Croat community, derive their name from their traditional community center, Janjevo. It is believed that the community descends from migrating merchants, miners and entrepreneurs from the Republic of Ragusa (Dubrovnik and its hinterland, families Glasnović, Macukić, Ćibarić, Matić, Ivanović), Bosnia and Herzegovina (families Ivanović and Brkić) and Kotor who settled the area in the 14th century medieval Serbia, The earliest written record of Catholics in Janjevo is a letter from Pope Benedict XI, dated 1303, which mentions the Catholic parish of St. Nicholas with its center in Janjevo. Together with the Saxons from Saxony, they worked in the Serbian mines. The Croatian population of Shasharë is believed to be of partial Saxon origin. Stronger national awareness among Janjevci came in the 19th century thanks to the work of the Herzegovinian Franciscan Franjo Brkić and the teacher Jakov Slišković, as well as during the interwar period.

=== Folklore ===
The Albanian, Bulgarian, Serbian and Turkish influences are visible in folk costumes, songs and oral tradition.

==== Oral traditions ====
Janjevci have several legends related to the origin of Janjevo. The first one describes how in the dilbokoj planini ("deep mountain"), after a general famine, a sister and a brother lived alone, who did not know that they were related to the new Janjevo, while the second story mentions the terrible fate of people after the war and how they are the only ones Jana Palić "Nedokoljka" and one of the Glasnovićs are still alive; both stories are based on massive deaths and suffering during the Mongol invasion of the area.

==== Folk costume ====
The costume of adult men consisted of a mixture of oriental and Bulgarian costumes: a šubara on the head, then a shirt, a čakšire (long trousers with a long tour and narrow legs that fasten on the sides), mintan or palta (coat). A belt was tied around the middle of the body, and kondure or jemenije (shoes) were put on the feet.

Women, on the contrary, kept the oriental costume influenced by the Ottomans. Married women wore a fes or otos (a cloth cap sewn from velvet) on their head, and unmarried women wore a kucelj (braid) down their backs. A šamija (scarf) was also put on the head, woolen outside the house, and ordinary inside the house. On the upper part of the body, a mintan or mintanče (jacket) was worn, that is, a jelek or žamadan (vest), under which was a shirt with a lace collar. Women did not wear skirts, but dimije, over which a richly decorated bošča (apron) was draped, and the waist was tied with a kušak (belt). On working days, they wore nalunas (loafers), and when they went out of the house they put on jemenije (shoes) similar to civilian ones. Formal women's clothing was very expensive and colorful, so it was accompanied by appropriate jewelry: dukati, gold necklaces, đinđuves (pearl necklaces), curaće (earrings) and rings. Women's wedding clothing included, in addition to mintančet, dimije, shirts and a fez, a terlik (saffian shoes with ornaments), a duak (veil), earrings, a ring, two rows of rubije (Ducats) as head jewelry and one larger Ducat that went on forehead.

=== Language ===
According to Croatian classification, they speak in Janjevo-Lepenica idiom, which belongs to Torlak dialect group.

The names for the parts of the day are borrowed from Turkish: saba (morning), ićindije (afternoon after sunset) and akšam (dusk after sunset). Turkicisms are also belendzika (a thin oriental bracelet in a series of five to six), džam (glass), ćumbe (stove), tendžera (pot), duvar (wall). From Bulgarian "chromid" they took chromit (onion). Some family names are also Turkicisms: adža (uncle, father's brother), balduza (wife's sister), teza (maternal aunt), badžanak (each of the husbands of two sisters in relation to each other) and Albanisms: tota (grandmother) and nana (mother).

=== Religion ===
They have maintained their Catholic faith until today. Accordingng to the work of Croatian historian Đuro Arnold, the Janjevci have adopted the tradition of celebrating "Slava" - patron saint of the family (Arnold, 2013). Most of the families together celebrate Saint Nicholas (December 6 and May 9), Christmas and Veligdan (lit. "Great Day", Easter) along with Saint Sebastian, Saint Anne and Anthony of Padua. According to the research of anthropologist Pero Lučin, on the evening before the main feast, traditional "Pogača" bread and a candle are blessed by a priest and used at the family gathering (Lučin, 2004).

Family pilgrimages are made in Letnica at the Gulem Gospođindan (lit. "Great Lady-day", Assumption of Mary), Mali Gospođindan (lit. "Small Lady-day", Birth of Mary), Our Lady of Mount Carmel, St. Anne and in Pristina on the St. Anthony of Padua feastday. Janjevci would go on a pilgrimage to Letnica for the feast of the Assumption since the feast of St. Ane, on July 26, and they would stay there until August 19, then the whole family life would move to Letnica, where they would stay in zagrađi ("enclosures", special buildings in a row with a common wall that closed in a circle). However, the central place in the piety of the Janjevci was occupied by the veneration of St. Nicholas, the patron saint of sailors and travelers, and such a connection of the people of Janjevo on land with this saint connected to the sea is considered as a connection with the Franciscan ancestors who arrived in Kosovo from the Adriatic coast. Since the Middle Ages, they have attended Feast of St. Blaise in Dubrovnik and are regular members of the procession in which they are dressed in their folk costumes.

The community also celebrates Saint George's Day (known among Janjevci as Đurđevdan) - an important holiday, especially for teen Janjevci who would prepare a special celebration called "rifana", which lasted all night, where mischievous bećari (guys) tried to steal the prepared food from the girls they loved and cut the rope on the swings on which they were swinging. The parish church celebrates its feast day on the day of Translation of the Relics of Saint Nicholas from Myra to Bari (May 9 in byzantine calendar) which is known among Janjevci as sveti Nikola ljetni (lit. "Summer St. Nicholas", also župna slava ("parish Slava") or dan župe ("parish day")). On the feast of St. John the Baptist, they would burn straw that children jumped over, the custom was called kalavešnica and is connected to the pre-Christian celebration of the summer solstice.

== Demographic history ==
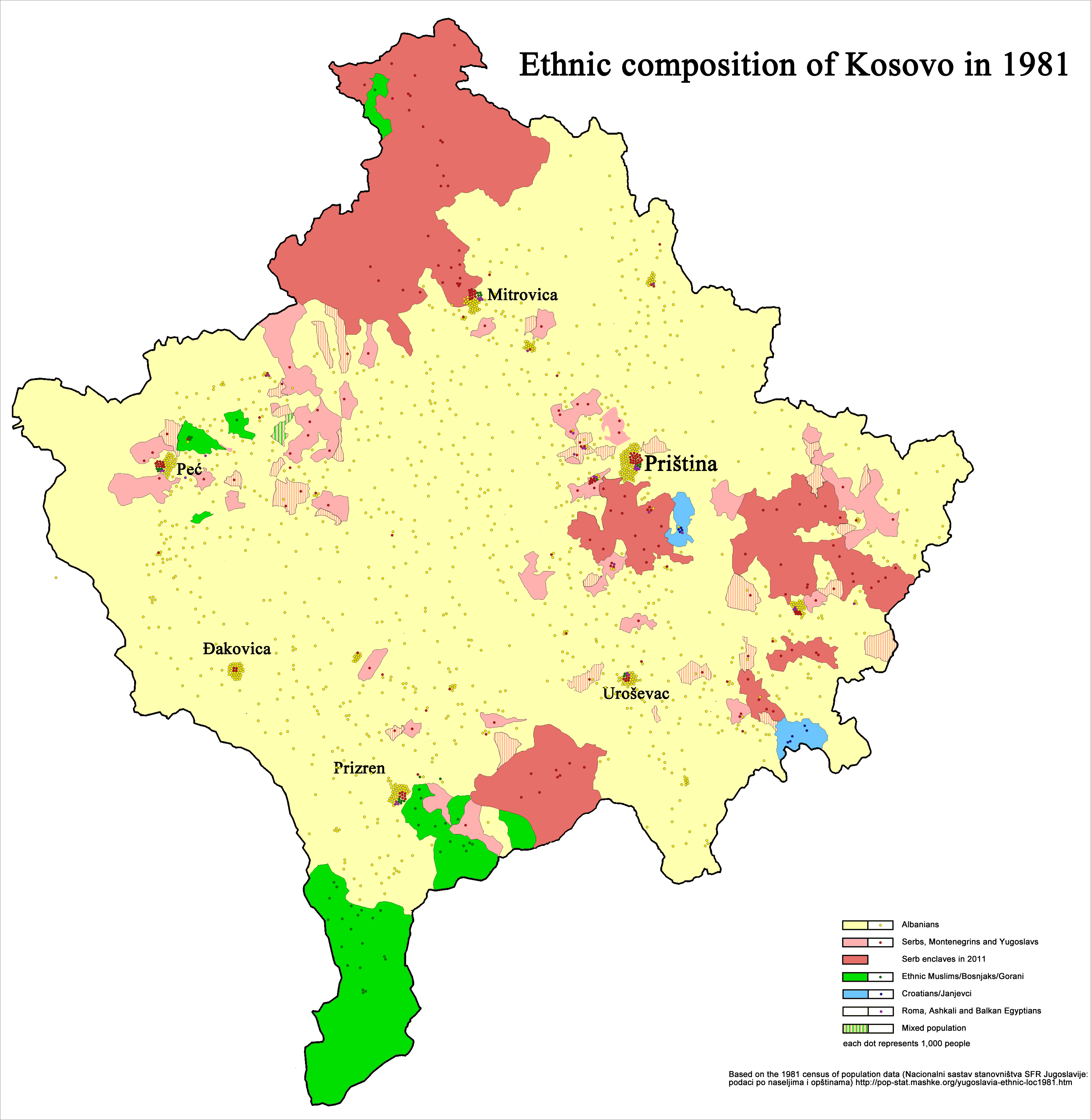
Ethnic composition of Kosovo in 1981 according to Yugoslavian census, with Serb enclaves shown as in 2011

In 1948, there were 5,290 Croats (0.7%) in Kosovo; in 1971 - 8,264; in 1981 - 8,718 (0.6%); in 1991 - 8,161 (0.4%). Considering Janjevo, in 1981 there were 3,534 Croats (out of 5,086 inhabitants), in 1991 2,589 (out of 3,319), by the end of the 1990s around 400, in 2008 - 300, in 2011 - 237 to 270. During and after the Kosovo War, most of the community had fled to Croatia. 1998 estimations had their number at only 1,800, of which 350 lived in Janjevo. The Croatian government has planned to resettle the remaining Janjevci in Kosovo to Croatia. According to the Kosovan 2011 census, there was a total of ca. 400 Janjevci, of whom 80 remain in the Vitia municipality.

== Janjevci community in Croatia ==
Janjevci families started migrating to SR Croatia, part of Yugoslavia, in the 1950s, mostly settling in Zagreb. By the beginning of the 1970s, there was a large community of Janjevci along and within the vicinity of Konjšćinska Street in Dubrava, a district in the eastern part of Zagreb. They have since turned this area into a vibrant shopping district. They are widely known as goldsmiths and merchants and recognised for their craftsmanship ("kujundžijstvo").

During the Yugoslav Wars, a significant part of the Janjevci emigrated to Croatia in several waves (1992, 1995, 1997, 1999), and Letničani were settled by the authorities in Voćin and Đulovac (western Slavonia) and Janjevci in Kistanje (the Dalmatian hinterland) in the abandoned homes of Serbs. Following the end of the Kosovo War from June to October 1999, the Janjevci population of Kosovo dropped from 700 to 360. Ongoing acts of violence and harassment from Kosovo Albanians and general uncertainty instigated the mass exodus.

In April 2017, 196 displaced Letničani, composed of 41 families who were waiting on homes promised by the state, were finally given newly built houses in the settlement Dumače, in the municipality of Petrinja.

According to records in 2002, there are 966 families of Janjevci in Croatia, with the majority of them residing in the capital Zagreb (669 families), and the rest in other parts of Croatia (297 families).

== Famous people ==
- Roko Glasnović - Croatian Roman Catholic prelate
- Anton Glasnović, Croatian sports shooter and World Championships silver medalist
- Josip Glasnović, Croatian sports shooter and Olympic champion
- Petar Palić, Croatian Roman Catholic prelate
- Željko Glasnović, Croatian military officer and politician
- Marijan Brkić Brk - Croatian guitarist and producer
- Mario Petreković - croatian television actor and presenter
- Blessed Alojzije Palić (Luigj Paliq) - Catholic priest and martyr

== See also ==
- Croatia–Kosovo relations
- Gorani, Slavic Muslim community in Kosovo
- Croats in Serbia
