= Janjevo =

Village in Lipjan, Kosovo

Janjevo: Janjevë (Albanian) Janjevo or Јањево (Serbian)
- Village
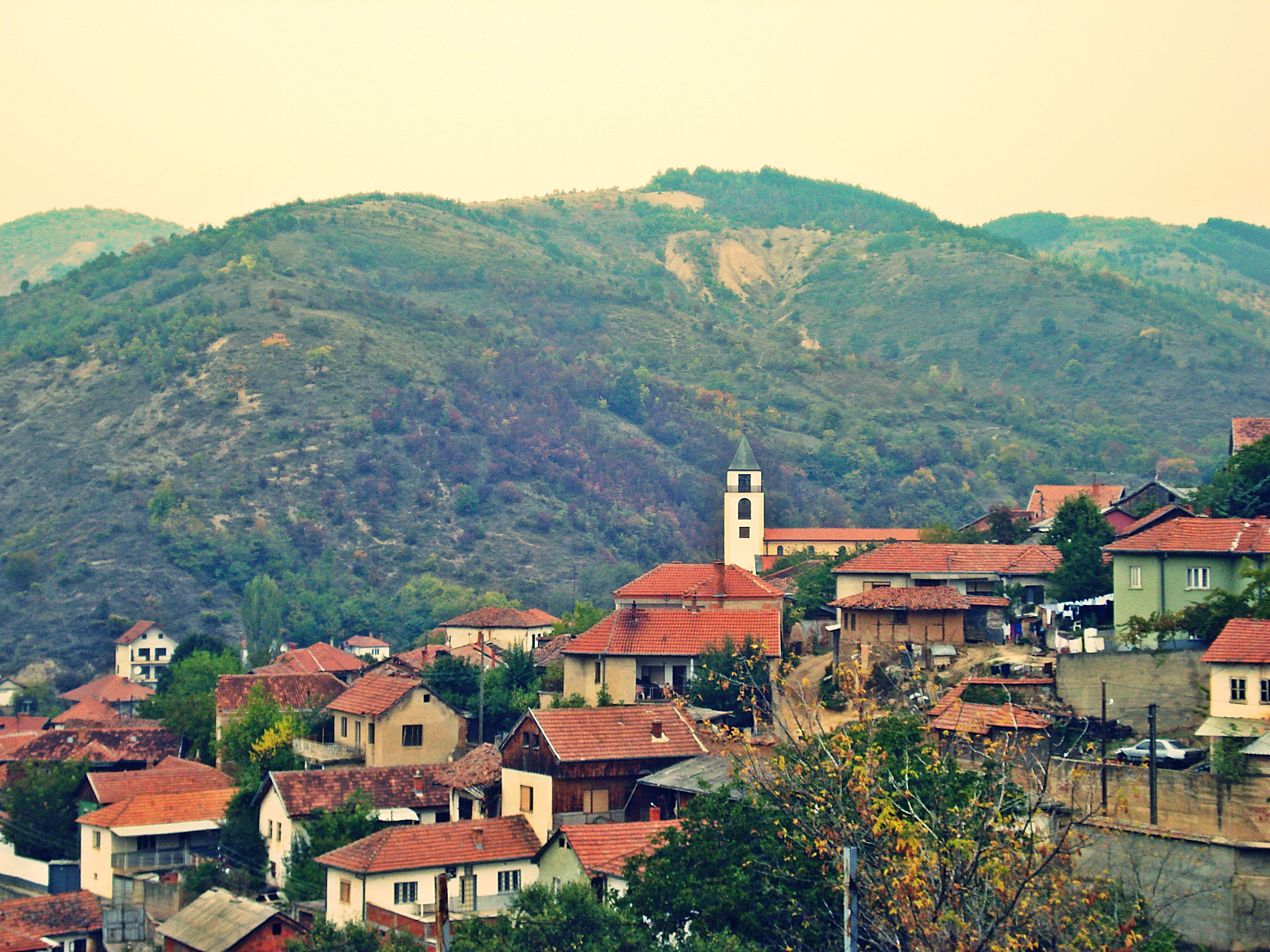
- Janjevo (St. Nicholas church in the background)

- Location in Kosovo
- Coordinates: 42°34′26″N 21°14′56″E
- Location: Kosovo
- District: Pristina
- Municipality: Lipjan

Population (2024)
  - Total: 1,407
- Time zone: UTC+1 (CET)
  - Summer (DST): UTC+2 (CEST)

Janjevo (Serbian Cyrillic: Јањево) or Janjevë (in Albanian) is a village or small town in the Lipjan municipality in eastern Kosovo.

The settlement has a long history, having been mentioned for the first time in 1303 as a Catholic parish. The town was prior to the Kosovo War (1998–99) inhabited by a majority of Croats, known by their demonym as Janjevci, who since have left massively for Croatia.

== Geography ==
Janjevo is described as a village or small town, located in Lipjan municipality, by Gornja Gušterica and Teče.

== History ==
=== Middle Ages ===
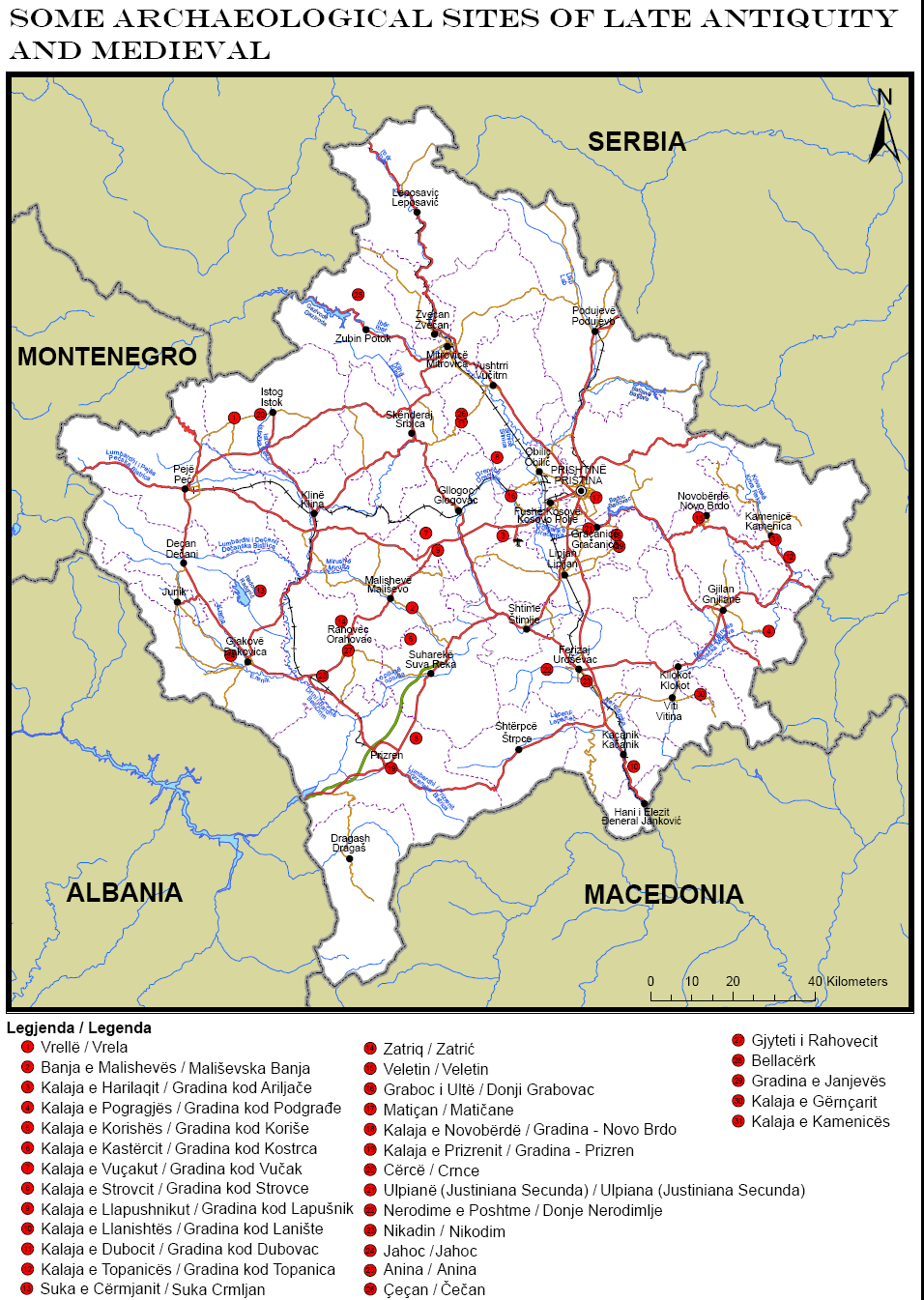
Forts and settlements in late antiquity Kosovo

Janjevo was first mentioned in 1303. Although only a Catholic parish is mentioned, and no information on mining activity, it is assumed that the Catholic community in fact drew from miners, gathered in such numbers to constitute a parish. Whether these Catholics were Ragusans or Saxons is unknown; with the opening of mines in medieval Serbia, Saxons (Sasi) are mentioned as mining specialists; although they are not mentioned as inhabiting Janjevo, they most likely did, as the settlement Šaškovac located less than 1 km from Janjevo points to. In 1346, the Pope sent a letter to Stefan Dušan regarding churches that belonged to the Diocese of Kotor, in which Janjevo is mentioned.

In the first half of the 15th century, when the area was still part of a Serbian state, a Croatian colony of tradesmen from Ragusa and Kotor appeared in Janjevo. At this time, Janjevo, along with Novo Brdo and Trepča, were the most important mines in Serbia. Out of 15 manholes only two produced qualitative ore. From 1455 a coin mint was active in Janjevo. The local Catholic church, dedicated to St. Nicholas, was built in the 15th century. In a tablet dating to 1425, Stephanus Marci, a priest of the Janjevo parish, is mentioned. In 1441, priest Andreas was the head of the Janjevo parish, based in that church. The population of this Catholic parish of Janjevo were mainly members of a Ragusan colony (to which Andreas also belonged). Janjevo most likely fell to the Ottoman Empire after the Ottoman conquest of Novo Brdo (1455).

=== Ottoman period ===
In 1530–31 there were six Christian and one Muslim neighbourhoods (mahala) in Janjevo. In 1569–70 it became an imperial estate with revenue (hass). There were at that time seven neighbourhoods. Marino Bizzi (1570–1624), the Archbishop of Bar, listed 120 Latin (Catholic), 200 schismatic (Orthodox), and 180 Turkish (Muslim) homes, during his journey in Ottoman Serbia in 1610.

The 16th century Ottoman defters also show that Janjevo contained an Albanian population of Muslim and Christian faith and a Christian Albanian neighborhood in Janjevo called "Arbanas". The Muslim population had Islamised Albanian names and Muslim names while the Christian population of Arbanas had a mixture of Albanian, Christian and Slavic names. As such, the historian Mark Krasniqi considers the inhabitants of Arbanas to be Albanians who bore Orthodox Slavic names or Albanian-Slavic names. Albanian names were also present in other neighborhoods and some of the inhabitants would have a mixture of Albanian and Slavic names. The neighborhood 'Arbanas' was mentioned with 74 homes.

According to local tradition, the population moved to its present location from "Old Janjevo" (located between the hills of Borelina and Surnjevica) in c. 1630 due to Albanian zulum (injustice).

One of the first schools in the history of Kosovo opened in Janjevo in 1665 and is still in use today.

A letter survives in Janjevo from 1664 from the Albanian Catholic Andrea Bogdani whom wrote that the Orthodox Serbs, whom were being protected by the Ottomans and which he considered the Catholics worst enemies, were trying to collect tributes from the Catholics.

=== Contemporary ===
In 1922, Henry Baerlein noted that the Austrians had for thirty years tried to Albanianize the Janjevo population. In 1997, the Croatian government began resettling Croats from the village to Kistanje in Croatia. During the Kosovo War (1998–99), many of the Croats resettled to Croatia as they feared the ongoing battle waged by the Yugoslav Army and the Kosovo Liberation Army. As of 2011, only 270 out of the pre-war 1500 Croats remain in the village.

A Catholic church (St. Nikola) is located in the town about 100 meters from the main mosque.

== Anthropology ==
In the Middle Ages, Croats from Ragusa and Kotor as well as likely Saxons (Sasi) inhabited the village. The inhabitants of Janjevo have in the past called themselves and been called "Latins" (Croatian: Latini). Anthropologist A. Urošević noted during field study, published in 1935, that many Janjevans lacked national consciousness. They spoke a Kosovan dialect, as the Serbs, but called it Janjevan. As the Serbs, they had family feast days (slava).

In 1991, the most numerous families were the Palić (Matić and Rucić), Glasnović (Tomkić and Topalović), Ćibarić, Berišić (Ancić, Mazarekić and Golomejić), Macukić, and Cirimotić.

== Demographics ==
The population of Janjevci has decreased since the 1970s. Since 1971, the Janjevci have immigrated from Janjevo to Zagreb and Kistanje, causing a decline in their population.

According to the 2011 census, there was a total number of 2137 inhabitants. Albanians numbered 1586, Croats - 270, Roma - 177, Turks - 118, Ashkali - 11, Bosniaks - 5, Unknown - 4, Serbs - 1, Undeclared - 1.

Demographic history

- 1991: 4797 (est.); Croats - 2859, Roma - 344, Albanians - 59 (est. 1539), Serbs - 8
- 1981: 5086; Croats - 3534, Albanians - 1078, Roma - 331, Serbs - 21.
- 1971: 4742; Croats - 3761, Albanians - 576, Roma - 218, Serbs - 51.
- 1961: 3762; Croats - 3052, Albanians - 302, Serbs - 47, Roma - 7.
- 1953: 3420
- 1948: 3090

== Notable people ==
- Shtjefën Gjeçovi (1874–1929), Albanian Catholic priest, nationalist, ethnologist and folklorist. His monument resides in the town, and his house is now a museum.
- Pal Dodaj, (1880–1951), Albanian translator and philosopher
- Matija Mazarek (1726–fl. 1792), Catholic archbishop
- Pajsije, Serbian Patriarch 1614–1647
- Vikentije Popović-Hadžilavić, Metropolitan of Karlovci 1713–1725
- Alojzije Palić (1877/8-1913), Catholic priest

== Sources ==
- Duijzings, Ger (2000). Religion and the Politics of Identity in Kosovo. C. Hurst & Co. Publishers. pp. 43–. ISBN 978-1-85065-431-5.
- Kovačević-Kojić, Desanka (11 July 2007). Gradski život u Srbiji i Bosni (XIV-XV vijek): The Urban Life in Serbia and Bosnia (XIV-XV Century). Istorijski institut. pp. 21–. ISBN 978-86-7743-059-7.
- Nušić, Branislav Đ. (1902). "Kosovo: opis zemlje i naroda" (in Croatian).
- Radovanović, Milovan (2008). Kosovo i Metohija: antropogeografske, istorijskogeografske, demografske i geopolitičke osnove. Službeni Glasnik. ISBN 9788675497806.
- Urošević, Atanasije (1935). "Janjevo". GSND. XIV. Skoplje.
