= Afghanka =

Military uniform of the Soviet Army

Obr88 "Afghanka"
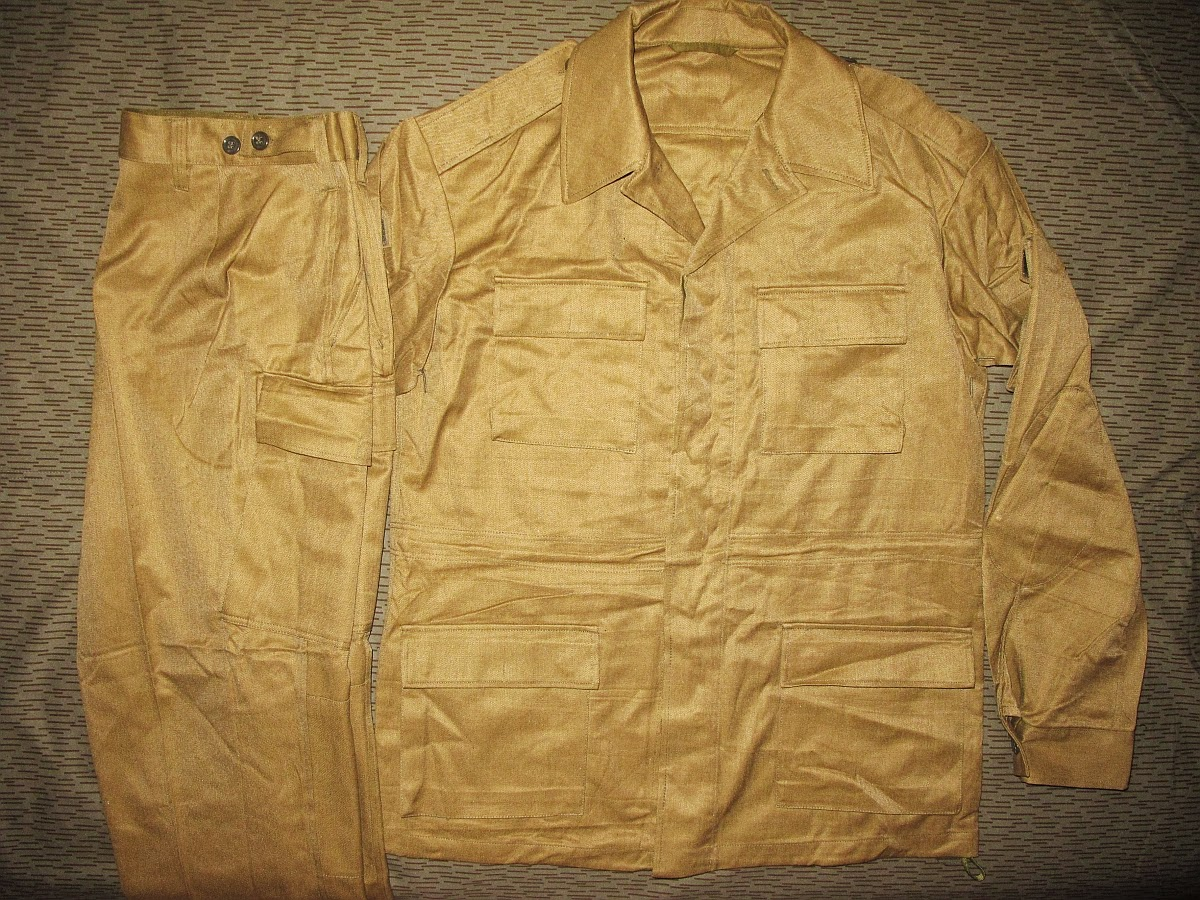
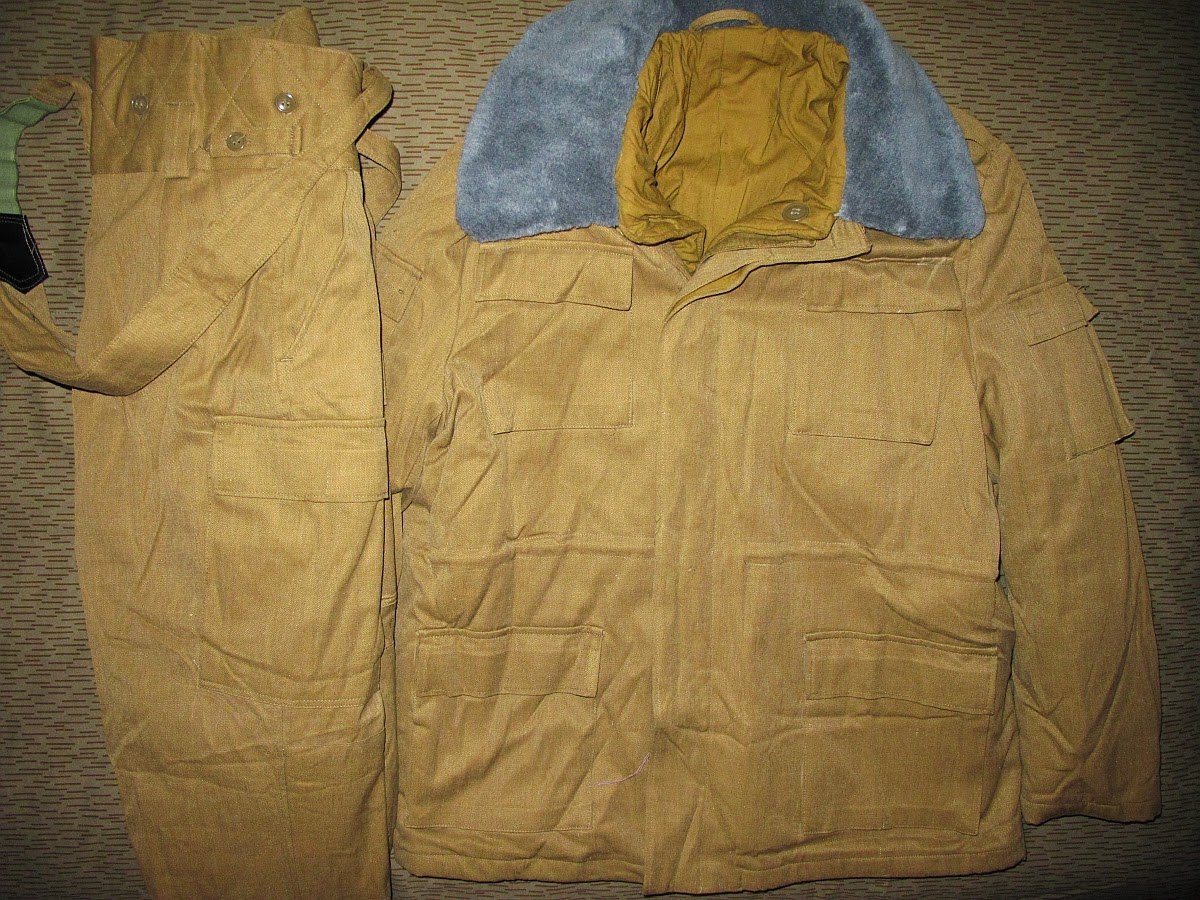
- Two types of Afghanka uniforms. The summer version (Left) and the winter version (Right)
- Type: Military uniform
- Place of origin: Soviet Union

Service history
- In service: 1980s–present
- Used by: See Users
- Wars: Soviet–Afghan War; First Chechen War

Production history
- Variants: See Variants

The Afghanka (Russian: Афганка, romanized: Afganka [ɐvˈɡankə]; proper designation: Obr88) is a type of military uniform system developed and issued by the Soviet Army in the early 1980s, still in use today in some post-Soviet states in many different variants. The name Afghanka is an unofficial popular slang term in Russian for the uniform, derived from its prolific use during the Soviet–Afghan War.

They are typically made of cotton (Russian: хлопчатая бумага or "Х/б", "cotton paper"). The more modern ones in Digital Flora were made of ripstop 53% cotton / 47% polyester "PolyCo", which Splav calls "Gretta". Since these were made by Splav, it is possible that other Afghanka offerings by Splav are either official Russian military / paramilitary pieces, or exact copies of said pieces.

== Design details ==
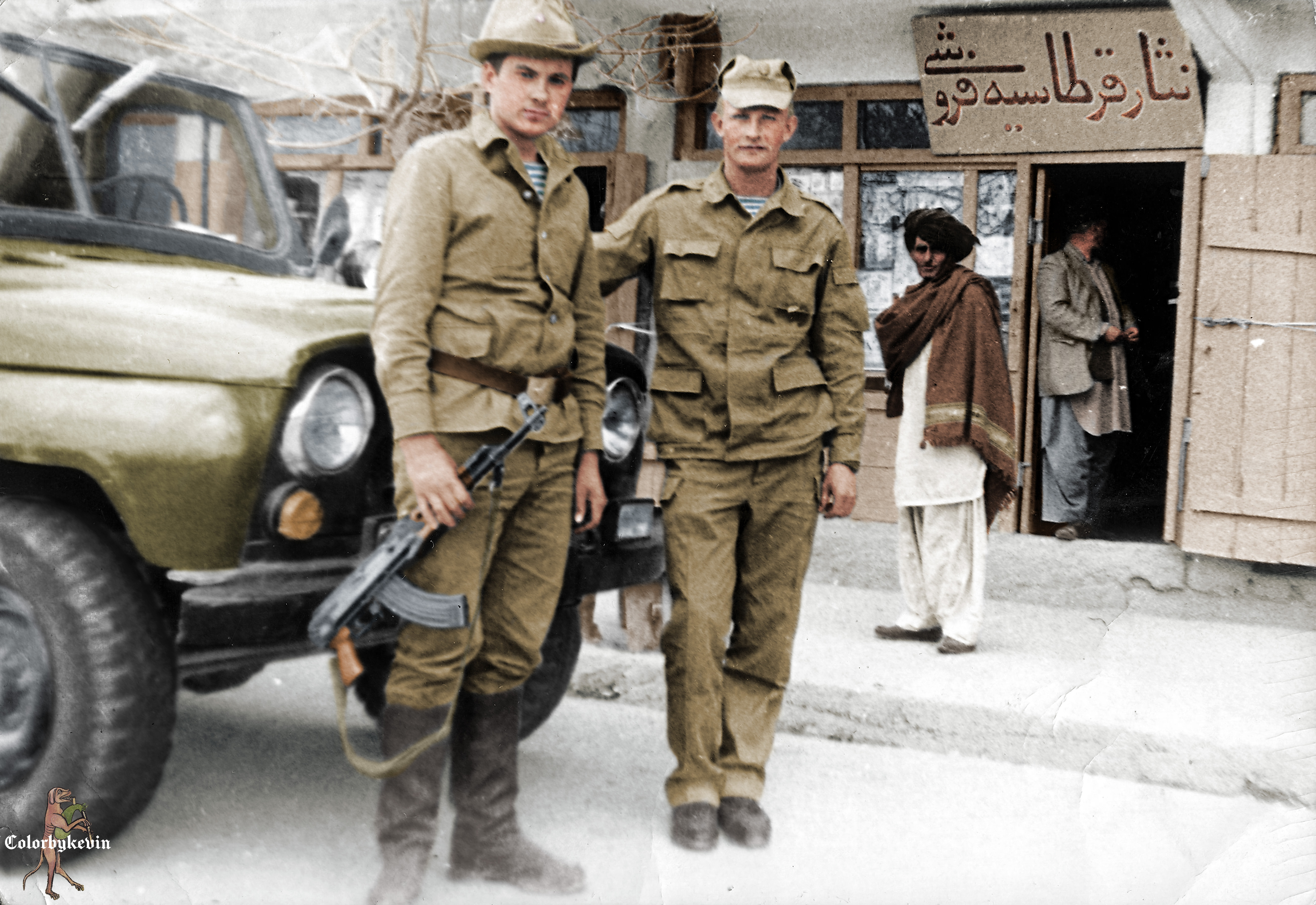
Two Soviet soldiers in Afghanistan wearing Afghanka (colorized image)

The Afghanka field uniform is made in a lightweight summer and heavier, lined winter version; both consist of a long, loose fitting 6-pocket BDU-style jacket with large stand-and-fall collar, epaulettes, concealed buttons, armpit vents, and tube-style field trousers with cargo pockets on the thighs. A field cap made from sturdier cotton and featuring ear flaps which could be unbuttoned and lowered to protect the ears was supplied with the uniform.

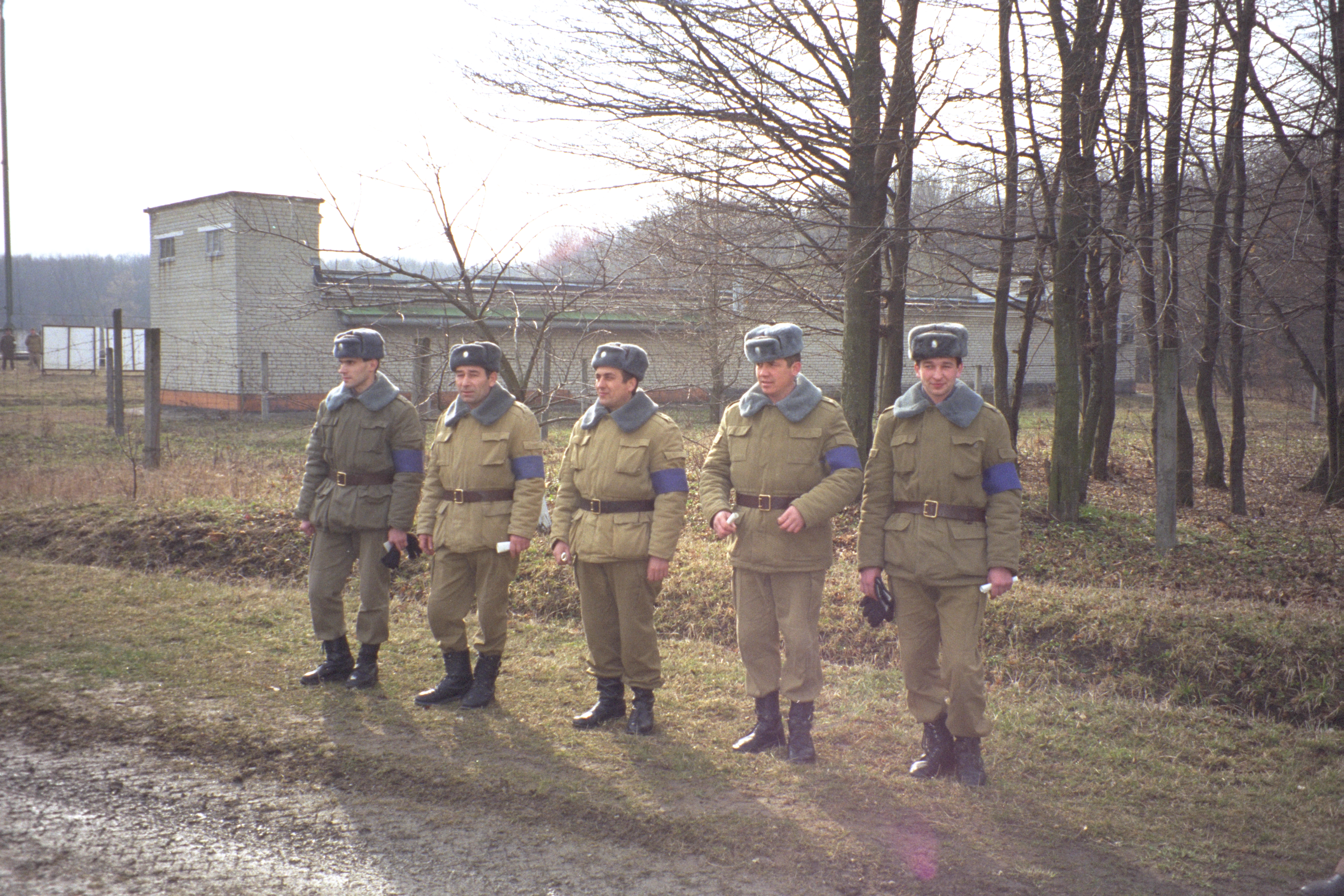
Ukrainian soldiers wearing the winter model of Afghanka

The winter model is composed of: jacket, jacket liner, trousers, plus insulated liners and suspenders. The liners are buttoned into their respective garments, and the outer garment can be worn without the liners. The jacket liner bears the fur collar of the jacket, usually in fish fur but occasionally in real fur (officer's uniforms). The jacket and trousers are lined with a pile-type material that helps insulate by trapping warm air, whereas the liners are made of a quilted material similar to the Telogreika uniform.

=== Colouring ===
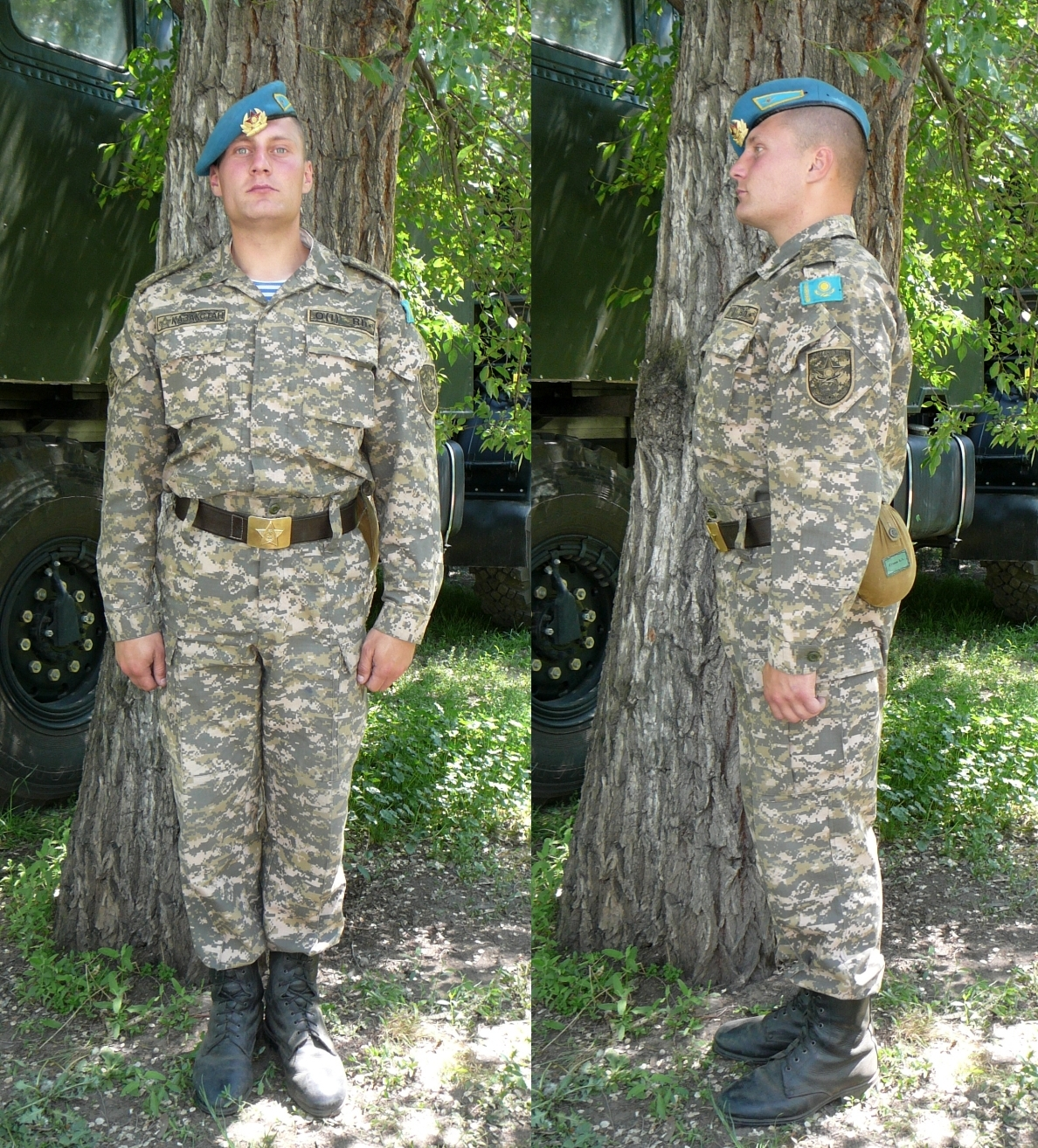
A variant of Afghanka in the camouflage of the Kazakh Air Assault Forces

The Obr88 were originally made in a khaki-coloured material, but factory variants on occasion resulted in slight discoloration such as olive drab, tan, and sage green. Later in the Soviet-Afghan War, camouflaged variants similar to the British Disruptive Pattern Material and American Woodland began to appear.

Since the fall of the Soviet Union, the Afghanka has been copied and issued widely by CIS members in various localized camouflage patterns.

== Operational history ==
The Afghanka began appearing in Soviet military units in the early 1980s during the Soviet–Afghan War of 1979-1989, hence the name. The design of the jacket and trousers may stem from similar patterns used by other Warsaw Pact armies such as by the Nationale Volksarmee of the GDR. Initially only used in Afghanistan, the Afghanka uniform was in very short supply and was often issued to units rather than individuals and passed around as necessary for various duties. By the end of the 1980s, it had become possible to issue a personal Afghanka to each soldier. Individual soldiers began marking the collars of their uniforms with bleach. In 1988 the Soviet Armed Forces adopted the uniform as standard issue, replacing the ageing Obr69 Uniform in all theaters.

The soldiers found the new uniform very effective, especially in Afghanistan. Even without the liners in, a winter Afghanka provides comfortable warmth in temperatures down to −20 °C. Other advantages of the winter Afghanka over the preceding bushlat (pea coat) and over the shinel greatcoat included greatly enhanced mobility for the wearer, and the increased number of pockets.

== Variants ==
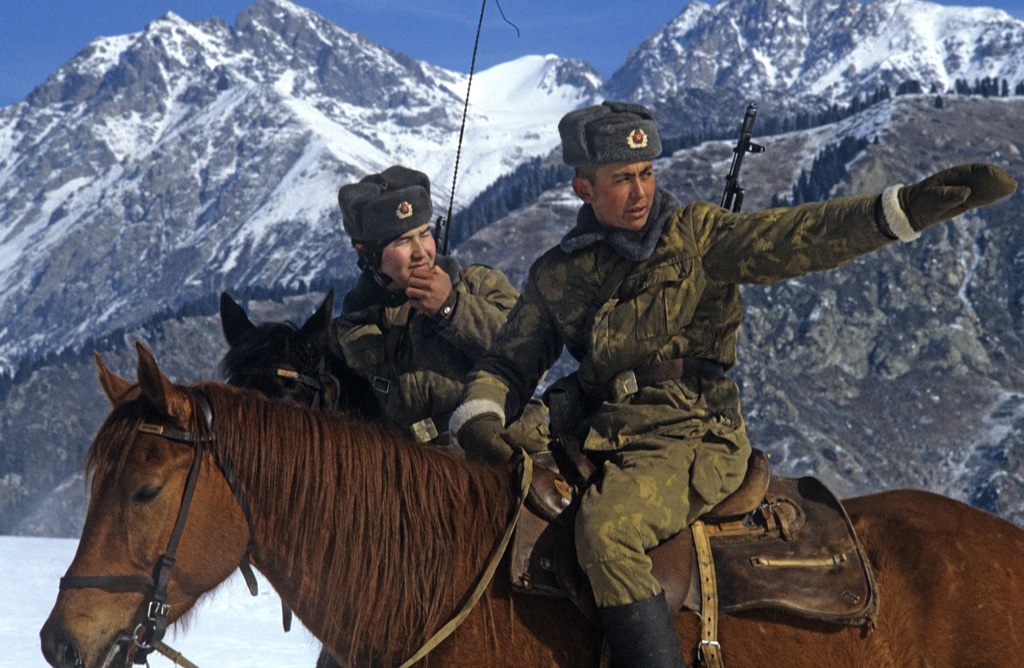
Two Soviet soldiers on horseback sporting Afghanka with the "Birch" camouflage pattern

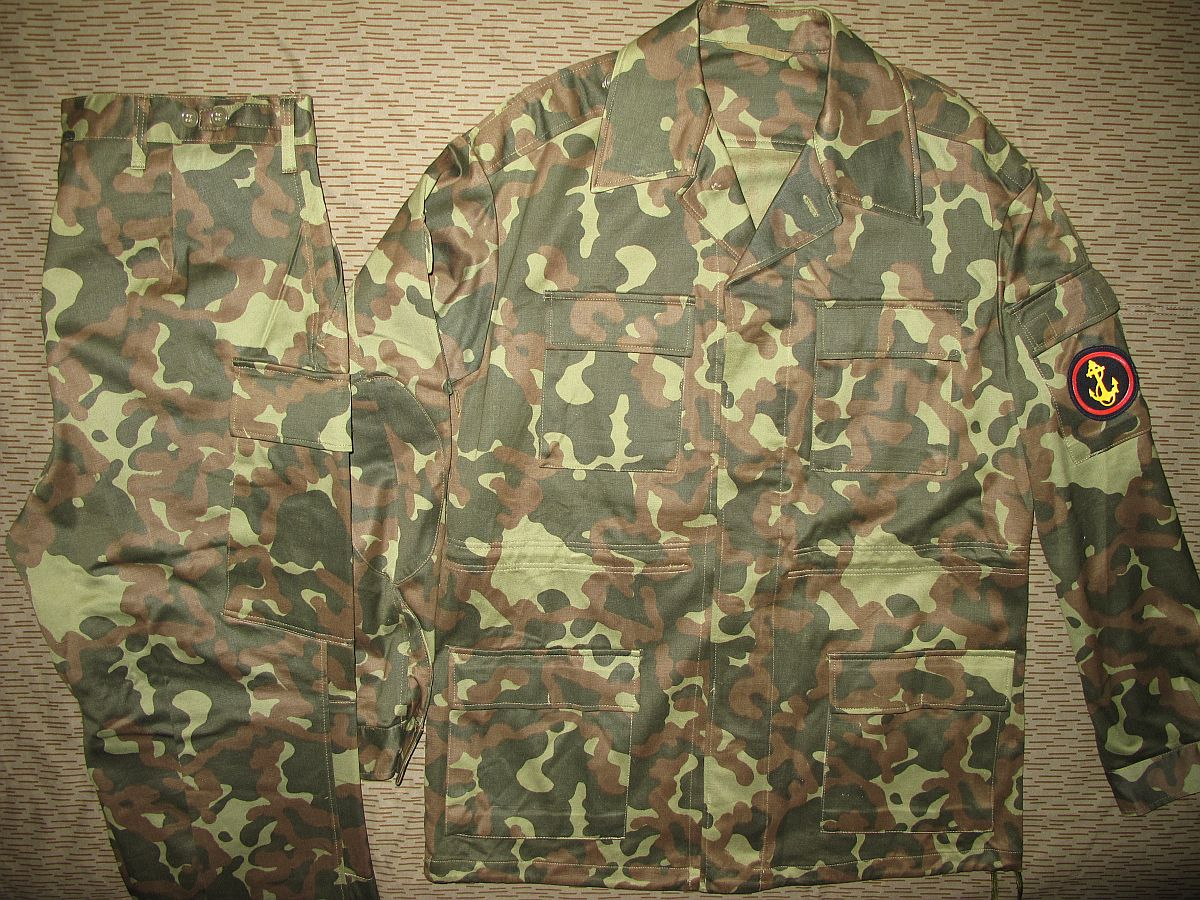
Soviet Marines Afghanka in the TTsKO-Butan camouflage, issued starting in 1985

The Afghanka was initially issued to regular units of the armed forces in a khaki colour. The uniform was also standardized with the KGB Border Troops, but in the service's unique "birch" camouflage pattern (similar to that used on the KLMK camouflage coverall) as well as Soviet Marines, who were the first to be issued with the newest Soviet camouflage development of the time — the woodland-style three-coloured Butan pattern (also known as TTsKO).

Although derived from a previous chemical-warfare uniform known as OKZK-D, the camouflage uniform made for Soviet VDV paratroopers in 1984 included many features from the Afghanka. Since then, various other uniforms evolved from the Afghanka in various camouflage patterns—such as VSR-93 (the standard field uniform of the Russian Armed Forces since 1993, and later "horizonal VSR" / Flora camouflage (issued since 1998), and many others. MVD Internal Troops frequently used "Les" (copy of US woodland) or "GOROD / Urban Les" during the 1990s.

Belarus, Kazakhstan and Ukraine both currently issue Afghanka-cut uniforms in their own camouflage patterns. Ukraine used many different recolors of "TTsKO" and they kept using them well into the 2010s.

The Soviet and Russian VDV model, made in either khaki, Butan, or VSR, lacked the lower patch pockets on the jacket as the blouse was intended to be worn tucked inside the trousers, to better accommodate the numerous harnesses used with a parachute. Both the USSR and the Russian Federation have also produced the uniform in plain colours for paramilitary use.

=== Splav variants ===
Since at least 2005, Splav has made "M21" Afganka's in Les (Woodland copy) camo. While they were once made of 100% cotton twill, they were then made of 60 percent cotton / 40 percent polyester, and then 53 percent cotton / 47 percent polyester "Gretta". Since these pieces heavily resemble 1990s pieces and the Splav has manufactured Afghankas for the Russian state, it's not clear which of these pieces were ever issued to Russian MVD internal troops.

== Users ==
=== Former users ===
- Afghanistan - Obr88 winter jacket issued to some soldiers and officers
- Armenia
- Azerbaijan
- Belarus
- Chechen Republic of Ichkeria
- Georgia
- Kazakhstan
- Kyrgyzstan
- Russia
- Soviet Union: Passed on to successor states.
- Turkmenistan
- Ukraine
- Uzbekistan

== See also ==
- Battle Dress Uniform
- Kepka-afganka
- Kirza
- Panamka
- Podvorotnichok
- Valenki

== Sources ==
- Soviet Uniforms and Militaria 1917–1991 by Laszlo Bekesi The Crowood Press UK (June 30, 2011), ISBN 978-1847972606
- Inside the Soviet Army Today. Osprey Elite Military History Series No. 12 by Stephen J Zaloga
- Russia's War in Afghanistan by David Isby
- Warsaw Pact Ground Forces by David Rottmman
