= Panamka =

Tropical hat worn by Soviet and Russian militaries

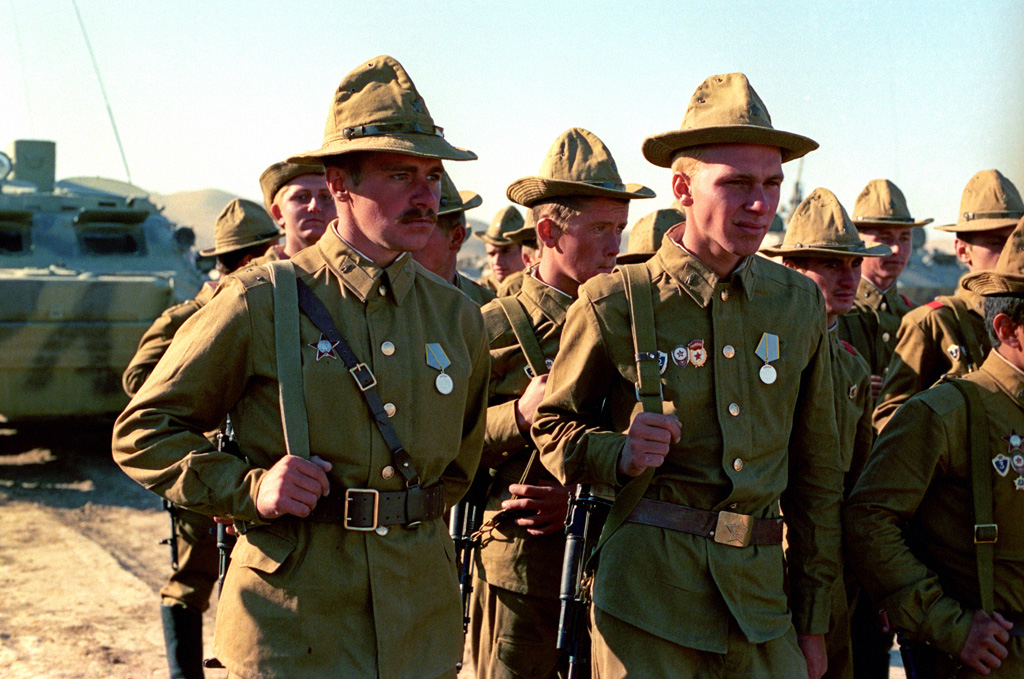
Soviet soldiers wearing Panamkas

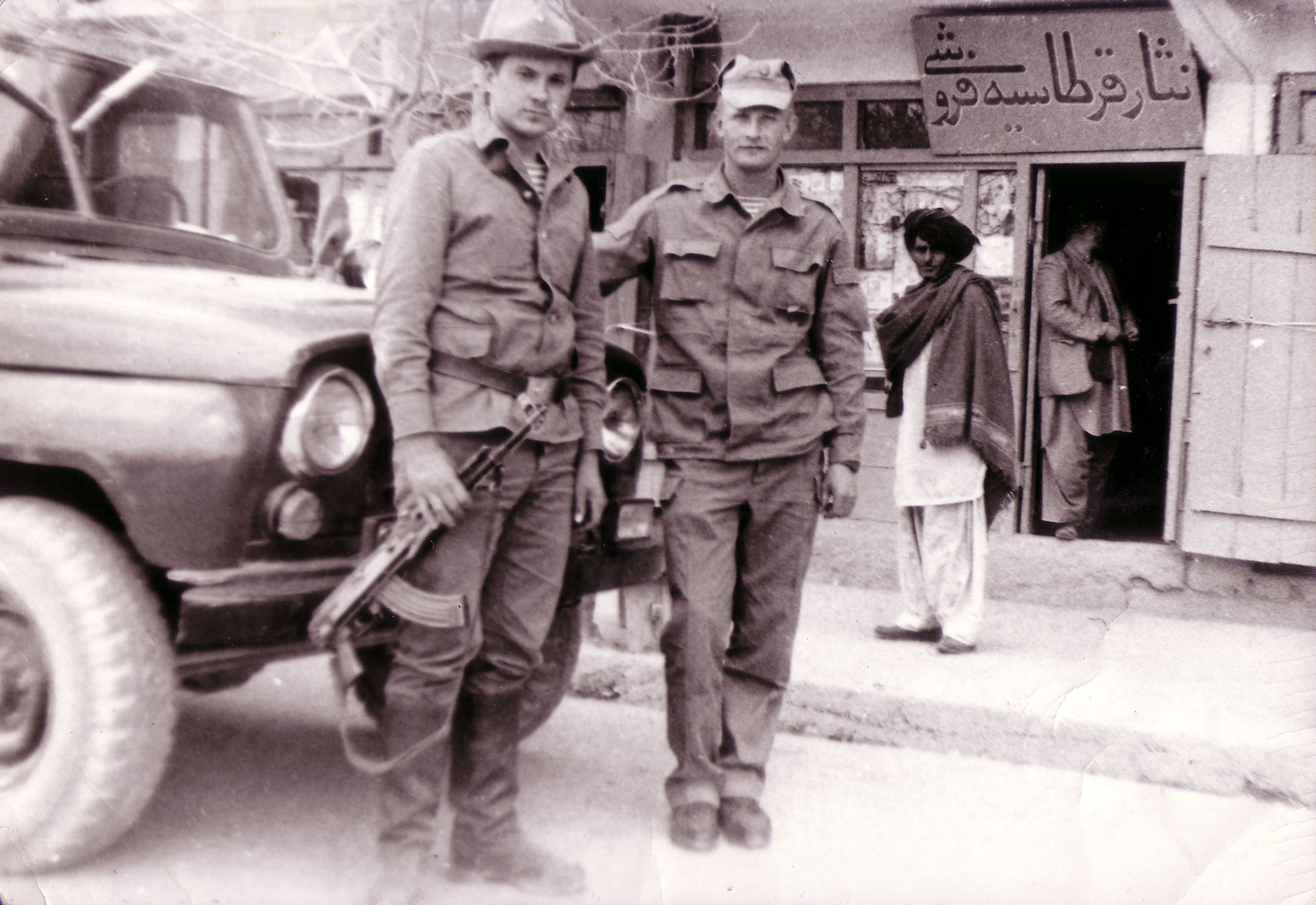
Soviet troops in Afghanistan

The Panamka (Russian: панамка), also called a Panamanka (Russian: панамaнка) by non-Russian speakers, was a common name for the standard tropical headgear of the Soviet Army. Officially, the M-38 Field Hat, the Panamka was introduced on 10 March 1938, for troops of the Red Army in the Central Asian, North Caucasian and Transcaucasian military districts and Crimea. It was nicknamed Panamka in reference to Panama hats, due to the vague physical resemblance between the two hats. The Panamka was popularized in Western imagery of the Soviet Union during the Soviet–Afghan War in the 1980s, where it was often worn with the Afghanka uniform as Afghanistan was known for its extreme hot daytime temperatures in the summer and its equally bitter cold nights in the winter months.

Two versions of the Panamka existed:

- The original hat was developed to keep the rays of sunlight off the wearer's head and out of his eyes. It was made of heavy cotton cloth and featured a set of ventilation holes, a thin leather headband, a plastic chinstrap, and the enameled metal M22 Red Star badge, on a large sewn on red star, on the front.
- A second version appeared with the Obr88 Afghanka, and more closely resembled the boonie hats used by NATO forces. It had a plastic chinstrap that rested on the rim and could be set to hang down by unbuttoning one side and passing it through holes on the rim, but it was too short for use as such. The chinstrap could be used to hold the sides of the rim up, this likely being its intended purpose. It also did not feature the large sewn on red star. Many of these were shipped to allies such as the Sandinistas, FRELIMO and the MPLA, the latter supplying some to SWAPO. Later production examples also feature a flat top and snaps or press studs that allow it be buttoned up on the side similar to the Australian slouch or bush hat.

== See also ==
- List of hat styles
- OKZK cap
- Valenki
- Podvorotnichok

== Sources ==
- Békési, László (2011). Soviet Uniforms & Militaria 1917–1991 in Colour Photographs. Photographs by György Török. Ramsbury, Marlborough: The Crowood Press. ISBN 978-1-84797-260-6.
- Zaloga, Steven J. (1987). Inside the Soviet Army Today. Elite. Vol. 12. Illustrated by Ronald Volstad. London: Osprey Publishing. ISBN 978-0-85045-741-4.
- Isby, David (1986). Russia's War in Afghanistan. Men-at-Arms. Vol. 178. Illustrated by Ronald Volstad. London: Osprey Publishing. ISBN 978-0-85045-691-2.
