= 73 Uniform =

Soviet military uniform

Obr.1969 Uniform
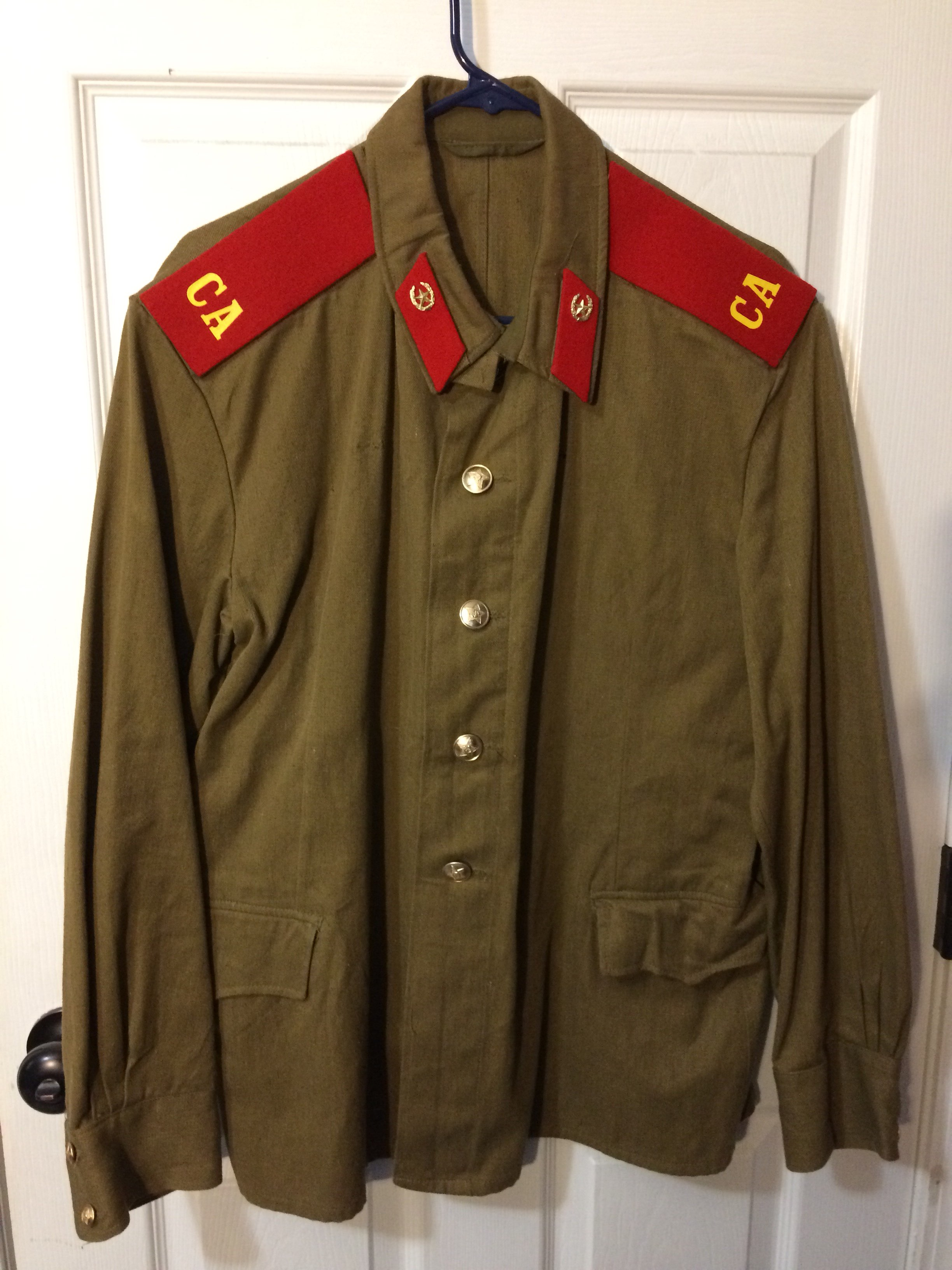
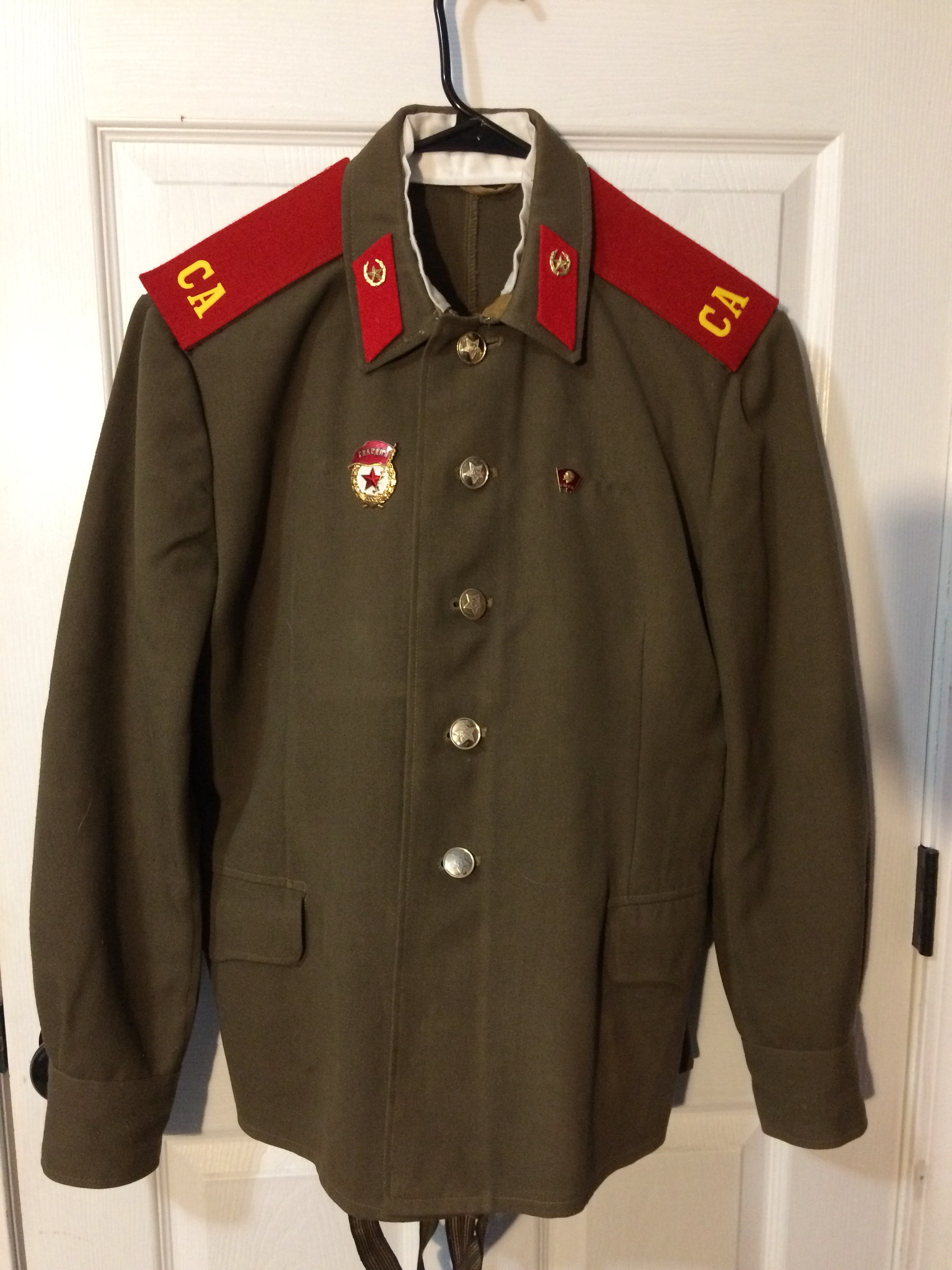
- Two types of enlisted man's Obr.69 uniforms. The summer version (left) and the winter version (right). Both have post-1973 Motorized Rifle insignia sewn on.
- Type: Military uniform
- Place of origin: Soviet Union

Service history
- In service: 1969–1990s
- Used by: Soviet Armed Forces and successor states
- Wars: Soviet–Afghan War; First Chechen War; War in Abkhazia (1992-1993); Georgian Civil War; Nagorno-Karabakh conflict

Production history
- Designed: 1966–1967
- Produced: 1966–1991

The Obr.69 (English: Model 1969), also known as the M69, was a Soviet military uniform introduced in 1969 to replace the Gymnastyorka-style uniforms. It was used by all branches of the Soviet Armed Forces, except the Navy. Produced in a variety of styles, the Obr.69 remained standard issue until it was gradually replaced by the Afghanka uniform in 1988; however, it continued to be used by some Soviet successor states well after the dissolution of the Soviet Union.

The terms "Obr.69" and "M69" are retroactive modern designations.

== Design ==
"Obr.69" refers to the series of dress and field uniforms introduced under the 1969 regulations. In most usage, the term applies to the enlisted men’s field uniform, officially described as "Field Dress" and produced in summer and winter variants.

The summer uniform was made of lightweight cotton and typically worn with the traditional Pilotka hat. The winter version used heavier fabric with a diagonal drill weave, resembling the gymnasterka. Officers’ models often had fur collars and "moisture-proof" outer fabric. The winter jacket, known as a "Bushlat" (pea coat), was usually worn with an Ushanka and, in cold weather, a Shinel greatcoat.

Sources differ on whether the material was quilted cotton or wool gabardine, both of which were used in the gymnasterka.

The summer uniform was generally worn from April to October, while the winter uniform was issued for colder months. The two versions differed little in cut, aside from the absence of reinforced knees in the winter trousers.

A tropical version, intended for southern regions, was produced in lighter material. This variant also lacked knee reinforcements and featured green felt insignia bases similar to Shinel greatcoats. It was worn with the Panamanka hat and appears to have been discontinued in the mid-1970s. Another variant was a polyester–cotton blend summer uniform, made of fabric similar to the U.S. OG-107 uniform referred to as "glass" fabric; a limited number of Pilotkas were produced in the same material. Surviving examples of both variants are uncommon. Black naval infantry uniforms were produced as well as those in Militia blue-grey for motorized police units of the MVD (SMChM).

Officers’ field uniforms were darker than enlisted men’s summer uniforms and had subdued green plastic buttons. They included branch-colored trouser piping and were worn with a subdued visor cap. Warrant officers wore a similar version, without gold piping on the collar tabs. Initially, all enlisted men’s uniforms used green plastic buttons; in 1973 these were replaced by polished brass, while officers retained green plastic ones. The Obr.69 tunic closed with buttons at the front, replacing the pullover Gymnastyorka design that had been in use for nearly a century. One explanation for this change was the anticipated use of chemical or nuclear weapons, since a pullover garment could not be removed without passing over the wearer’s face.

Uniforms were worn with shoulder boards and collar tabs that indicated rank and branch of service (see Military ranks of the Soviet Union). These were sewn on in full color; in the field, shoulder boards bore the "СА" cipher ("Soviet Army") from 1973 onward. A branch-of-service patch on the left shoulder was phased out in the early 1970s for being too conspicuous. In practice, insignia were often retained in the field until the Soviet–Afghan War in 1979. As with other Soviet uniforms, a Podvorotnichok was sewn into the collar and replaced daily. Awards could also be displayed on the chest when not in combat.

== History ==
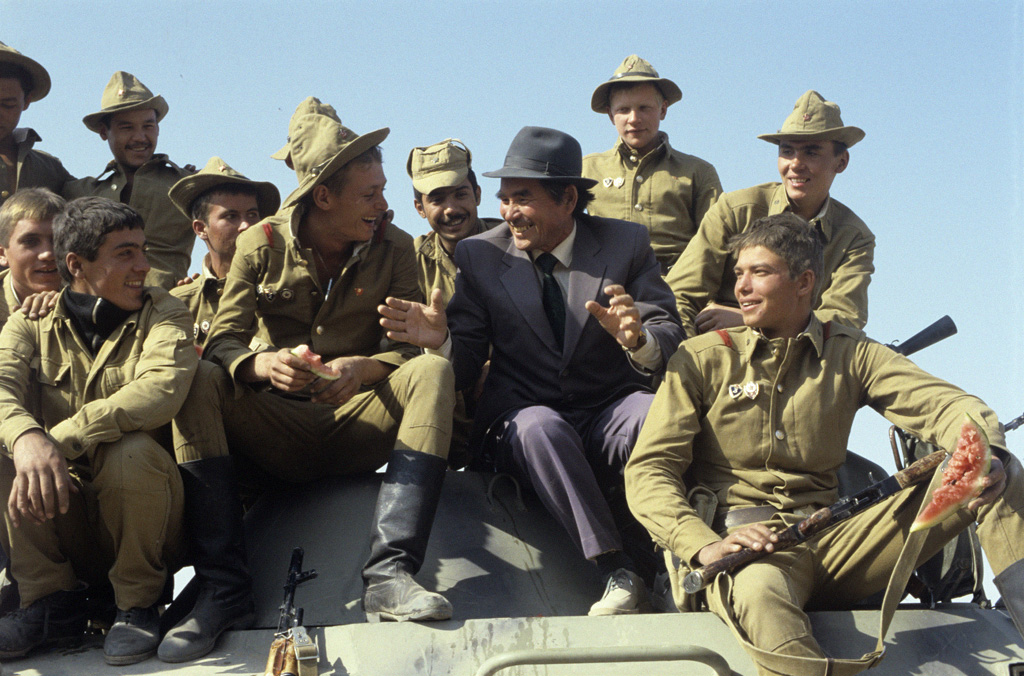
Soviet soldiers in Afghanistan wearing the Obr.69 uniform

Following the Second World War, the Soviet Armed Forces continued to wear the Obr.43 Gymnastyorka until the 1969 regulations introduced a new series of uniforms. Although the 1969 field uniform had no official name, it is commonly referred to by collectors as the M69, Obr.69, or M1969. A minor revision was introduced in 1973, when the green plastic buttons were replaced with brass for durability.

Experience during the Soviet–Afghan War revealed limitations of the Obr.69 in combat. The tunic had only two small pockets and the trousers, designed as breeches for tall Kirza jackboots, were poorly suited once soldiers increasingly adopted lace-up boots. In response, a more modern combat uniform, the Afghanka, was developed. Early examples appeared in Afghanistan in 1982, and by the late 1980s the Afghanka was standard there. The Obr.69, however, remained standard issue elsewhere in the Soviet military until the introduction of the "Obr.88" Afghanka in 1988. Both uniforms continued in parallel use until the dissolution of the Soviet Union in 1991, especially the winter variant of the Obr.69. Soldiers often wore the Obr.69 in garrison and Afghankas in the field.

After 1991, Obr.69 uniforms remained in use among several successor states. Some photographic evidence shows Russian troops wearing them in the First Chechen War (1994), as well as Chechen insurgents. Today, Obr.69 uniforms are of interest to military collectors.

== Users ==
=== Former users ===
- Russia
- Soviet Union

== Sources ==
- Soviet Uniforms and Militaria 1917–1991 by Laszlo Bekesi, The Crowood Press UK (2011), ISBN 978-1847972606
- Soviet and Mujahideen uniforms, clothing, and equipment in the Soviet Afghan War, 1979–1989, by Zammis Schein
- Inside the Soviet Army Today, Osprey Elite Military History Series No. 12 by Stephen J. Zaloga
- Russia's War in Afghanistan by David Isby
- Warsaw Pact Ground Forces by David Rottman
