= L-1 (CBRN suit) =

Soviet NBC suit

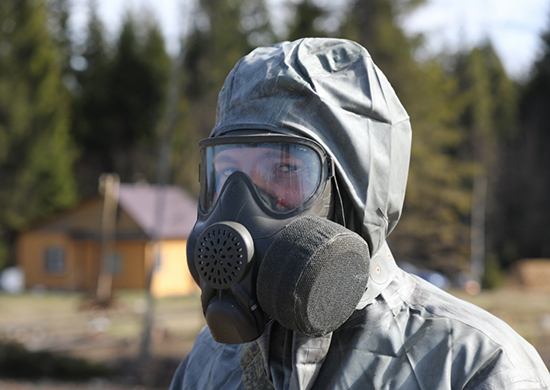
- Russian NBC troops soldier wearing an L-1 suit with a PMK-4 gas mask
- Type: NBC suit
- Place of origin: Soviet Union

Service history
- Used by: Soviet Armed Forces; Russian Armed Forces

Specifications
- Weight: ~ 3.2 kg

Protective Lightweight Suit L-1 (Note: Russian: Костюм легкий защитный, romanized: Kostjum legkij zashhitnyj, lit. 'Protective Lightweight Suit') is an NBC suit of the Soviet and Russian armed forces, designed to protect the skin of personnel and uniforms and footwear from toxic substances, radioactive particles, and biological agents.

== Components ==
L-1 consists of the following parts:

1. Semioveralls
2. Coat with protective hood
3. One pair of gloves
4. Six fasteners made of plastic materials for fastening of a coat and semi-overalls.
5. Bag

The suit comes in three sizes:

- 1 size - for people up to 165 cm (5 ft 5 in) tall;
- 2 size - from 166 to 172 cm (5 ft 5 in to 5 ft 8 in)
- 3 size - from 173 cm (5 ft 8 in)

Suit weighs around 3.5 kg (7.7 lb) (depends on size).

== Use ==
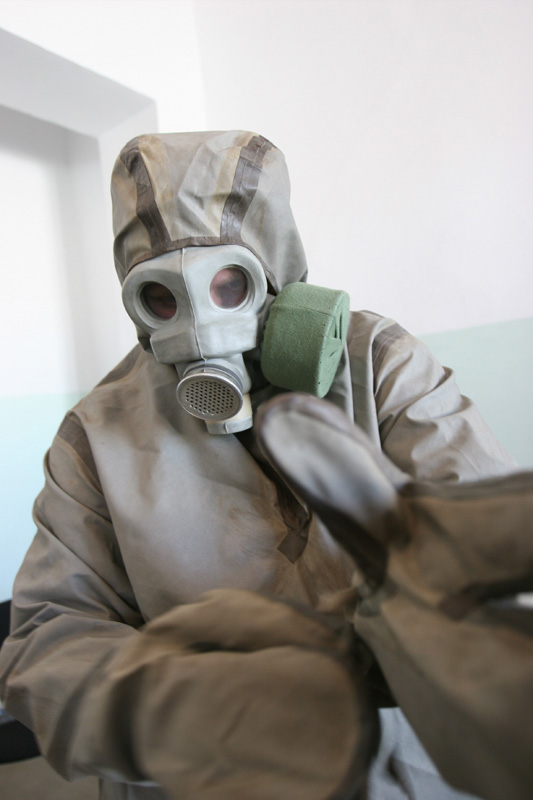
Mongolian soldier donning an L-1 suit with PMG gas mask

The L-1 suit is used in conjunction with personal respiratory protection equipment (PPE).

The L-1 suit is used in three positions: "marching", "ready", "combat". In the "marching" position, the L-1 suit is folded and transported in a bag. Before use, it is carried in a bag worn over the left shoulder over the equipment. In the "ready" position, the suit is used without a gas mask (the gas mask is put on as needed). The transfer of the L-1 suit to the combat position is carried out, as a rule, in an uninfected area by the command "Put on protective clothing. Gases!"

To avoid depressurization of the suit during bends, turns, and squats, the jacket has loops at the bottom of the sleeves, neck and crotch straps, and trousers also have slings and straps.

Chemical weapons destruction facilities use a lightweight protective suit L-1M, which has slight differences. The set of the L–1M suit additionally includes a jacket and trousers made of an adsorption-type filtering protective material, the volume of the hood and the length of the neck strap are increased. The latter is due to the use of a PFS gas mask when performing work.

The L-1 suit is worn:

- At a temperature of 15 °C (59 °F) and above over the undergarments.
- from 0 to 10 °C (32 to 50 °F) over OKZK (OKZK-M, OKZK-D) or upper clothes.
- from 0 to −10 °C (32 to 14 °F) - over the winter uniform.
- at temperatures below −10 °C (14 °F) - on top of a vatnik worn over the uniform.
