= Battle of Stalingrad's impacts on civilians =

Battle of Stalingrad civilian experiences, 1942-43

Impact on civilians during the Battle of Stalingrad
- Part of the Battle of Stalingrad
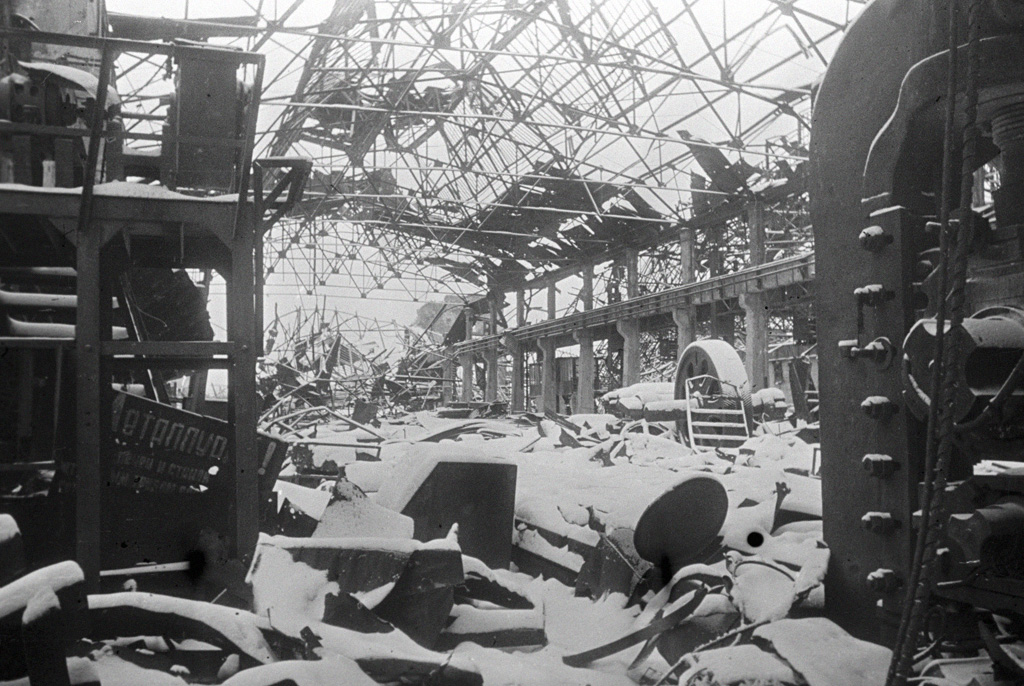
- The Ruins of Stalingrad Krasny Oktyabr, a Stalingrad steel plant known in the West as the "Red October factory" lies in ruins, 1943
Date	17 July 1942 (Note: The start of the battle is debated, with some historians putting it in August, with the most common date being on 23 August 1942.) – 2 February 1943 (Note: Some German holdouts continued to operate in the city and resist until early March 1943.) (6 months, 2 weeks and 2 days)
Location	Stalingrad, Russian SFSR, Soviet Union

Belligerents
(Soviet Union) Soviet civilians	Germany: (Soviet Union) Soviet civilians either recruited or forced to assist Axis forces; Romania; Italy; Hungary; Croatia (Note: Around 6,000 men of the Croatian Home Guard served in the German 6th Army as the 369th Infantry Regiment and in the Italian 8th Army as the Light Transport Brigade.)

Strength
445,476 civilians (1939 estimate), some equipped with locally-sourced weapons and equipment and captured German equipment	Varied; During early phases, Axis forces numbered over 100,000 personnel and during the Soviet counter-offensive numbered over 1,000,000 personnel. Forces were quipped with various Axis small arms, armored vehicles, and aircraft

Casualties and losses
40,000–235,000 civilian deaths	300,000–400,000 deaths

The Battle of Stalingrad's impacts on civilians were categorized by widespread chaos, devastation, war crimes, starvation, hypothermia, and disease. A major engagement on the Eastern Front of World War II, the battle was a protracted siege and struggle (July 1942-February 1943) within the Soviet Union between the Soviet military and various Axis powers led by Nazi Germany. At stake was control over the Soviet city of Stalingrad (now known as Volgograd) in southern Russia. The battle was notable for its exceptionally fierce close-quarters combat and direct assaults on civilians; the battle epitomized urban warfare and would be the costliest urban battle to ever take place.

Civilian casualties were extensive as a result of German military actions (often directed explicitly at civilians), extensive aerial bombing and artillery bombardments, and the Soviet governing party's refusal to initiate civilian safety procedures. Civilians became further involved by either being recruited or forced to "work" for the Axis or Soviet militaries, often as saboteurs, scouts, or general labourers.

Estimates of civilian deaths range from about 40,000 to up to 235,000. Stalingrad was almost entirely destroyed, with 99% of the city being considered "rubble" by February 1943. Estimates of the city's pre-battle population range from roughly 400,000-700,000 but only 1,515 civilians remained in 1943, with most having either fled or been killed. Later events of the war, such as the "rape of Berlin", are often considered "revenge" for the brutality civilians faced in Stalingrad.

== Devastation of Stalingrad ==
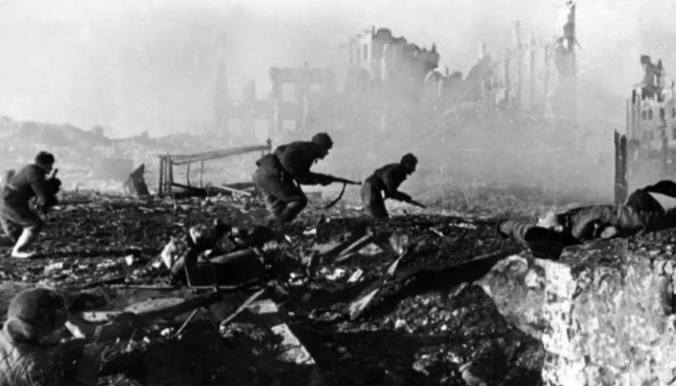
- Soviet infantry on the rubble of destroyed buildings

=== Initial instances ===
The first instance of devastation within Stalingrad was during a German assault into the city's northern suburbs, with the German Luftwaffe utilizing incendiary bombs. The operation destroyed a majority of the city's wooden buildings and the Soviet military began a generalised retreat into Stalingrad proper. Individual buildings would become objectives, assaulted by smaller military units broken-off from larger units; buildings would often change hands numerous times over the course of days and weeks. Other buildings were simply destroyed to prevent the enemy from fortifying themselves inside of them.

=== Civilian participation ===
All able-bodied men were mobilised, and civilians frequently participated in street fighting while German Luftwaffe bombing raids devastated the city’s streets and buildings. Repeated aerial bombardments dropped thousands of tons of high explosives on the city, destroying the majority of its structures and reducing large districts to rubble and ruins. By 1941 the city’s population, swollen by refugees, is estimated to be up to 900,000; many residents remained to keep war industries and factories operating, and civilian deaths among those working in such facilities have been estimated at about 40,000.

== Refusal to evacuate civilians ==
=== Party refusal to evacuate and efforts to prevent evacuation ===
At a Party meeting on 20 July 1942, authorities resolved to suppress what they described as "defeatist" and "evacuation moods" among Stalingrad’s residents. In several cases officials refused to permit individual evacuations or to issue evacuation papers, and factory workers who attempted to leave without authorisation risked being treated as deserters. Workers were generally allowed to evacuate only with their factory detachments and in some instances were required to leave family members behind. After Order No. 227 (popularly known as "[n]ot a step back") was promulgated on 28 July 1942, its provisions were applied to the civilian population of Stalingrad in addition to military personnel as originally intended. To prevent servicemen and civilians from crossing the Volga, city authorities established checkpoints at river embarkations to verify documents.

=== Civilian attempts to evacuate ===
Some residents sought permission to leave by feigning illness or by claiming marriage to servicemen in order to qualify for evacuation privileges. By the evening of 23 August 1942, when large‑scale German air attacks began, roughly 100,000 of an estimated 700,000-900,000 inhabitants had been evacuated and more than 40,000 civilians had been killed in the opening days of the bombardment. The bombing continued for a week, destroying an estimated 90 per cent of housing in a city dominated by wooden buildings. The city additionally lacked adequate bomb shelters, well‑equipped fire brigades and trained civil‑defence units; civilian fatalities from this period are estimated at up to 70,000.

In the weeks that followed, authorities increased evacuation operations across the Volga, which continued into mid‑September. Evacuation priorities favoured groups the state considered essential, including the wounded, men of draft age, engineers, other specialists and party officials, while women, children and the elderly often received lower priority.

The river crossings used for evacuation were repeatedly attacked and strafed by the German Luftwaffe. Eyewitness accounts from Soviet troops across the river describe desperate crowds at the ferries, corpses in the water and along the banks, and children separated from or searching for their parents. Reports of the chaos at the crossings and uncertainty about safety beyond the Volga led many residents to decide against attempting evacuation. Some women caring for large families or ill dependants chose to remain, particularly with winter approaching, while other residents disbelieved or downplayed reports of German atrocities.

=== Soviet portrayal of those left within the city ===
Soviet wartime literature portrayed many of those who remained as choosing to stay to prevent the city’s occupation and to assist frontline defence efforts. Contemporary tallies record that approximately 75,000 civilians undertook roles in support of the Soviet military, although many individuals lacked a meaningful choice in their circumstances.

=== Civilian adaptation ===
Survivors who remained in the city sheltered in sewers, cellars, and other subterranean spaces to escape bombardment and ground fighting. In these confined and hazardous environments, civilians were exposed to continuing military offensives and frequently shared crowded quarters with retreating or besieged combatants. Deprived of regular supplies and basic services, the civilian population organised informal communal arrangements to secure food, water, warmth and the mutual assistance necessary for survival amid the ruins of the city.

== Starvation, hypothermia, and disease ==
Incendiary bombing by the Luftwaffe destroyed stores, disrupted distribution networks and rendered many shelters unusable, producing acute shortages of food, fuel and other essentials during the Battle of Stalingrad. Procuring food and water required dangerous sorties into contested areas, exposing foragers to artillery, machine‑gun fire and strafing by aircraft, and many such excursions resulted in injury or death.

Large stocks of grain, flour and livestock were removed from the city or lost in the fighting, and wells and other water sources were disrupted or disappeared, accelerating the collapse of organised supply, distribution and public services. Survivors reported resorting to any available food, including wild plants, berries, small animals, repurposed leather, starch glue and river silt, to avoid starvation.

Families in the most heavily contested districts organised search parties to locate provisions, sometimes remaining out for days; such parties frequently encountered lethal risk. Grain was particularly prized and was recovered from sunken barges, abandoned rolling stock or taken from "the grain elevator", which fell into German hands at the end of September 1942; children were often used for foraging because their size and agility made them less conspicuous and better able to move through rubble and narrow spaces.

Regardless of foraging attempts, both sides suffered from mass starvation.

Disease also ran rampant, with many deaths due to dysentery, typhus, diphtheria, tuberculosis, and pneumonia, causing medical staff to fear possible epidemics. Lice were heavily prevalent, and swarms of flies would gather around kitchens, adding to the possibility of wound infections.

Brutal winter conditions affected soldiers and civilians alike tremendously, with temperatures at times reaching as low as −40 °C (−40 °F) in the second half of November, and −30 °C (−22 °F) in late January.

== Utilization of civilians as military assets ==
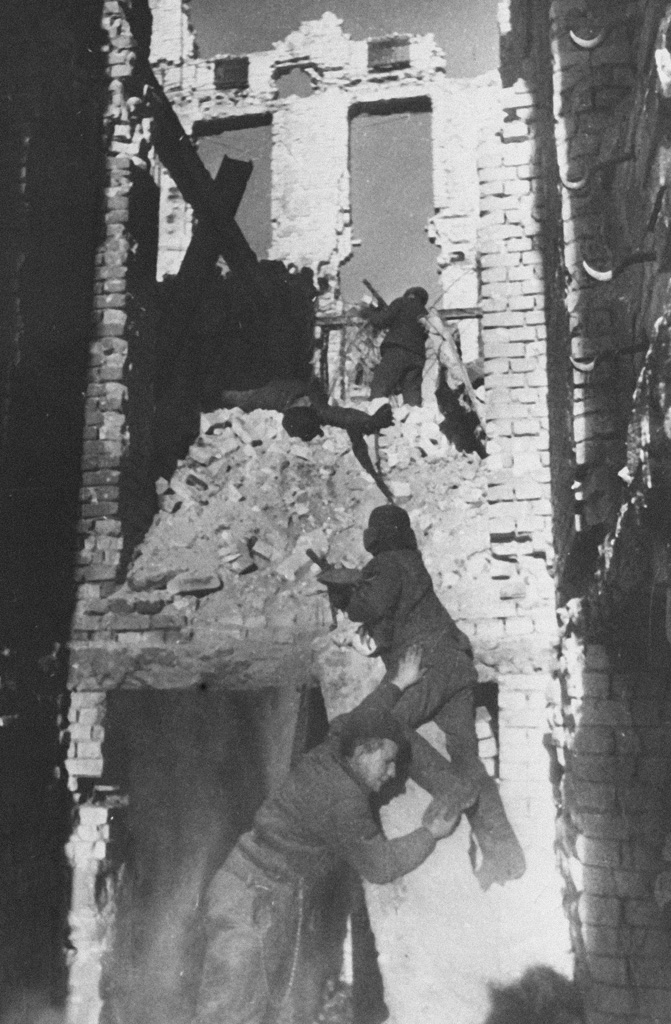
- Soviet soldiers during street fighting

During the battle civilians were frequently mobilised by both combatants for auxiliary roles and tasks. They served as saboteurs, reconnaissance agents, messengers and auxiliary labourers responsible for clearing corpses, carrying water from the Volga and performing other support duties for military units.

Those employed in such roles faced grave risks, since orders were issued on both sides to fire on persons attempting to cross front lines. Concern about enemy saboteurs and reconnaissance parties contributed to the decision in mid‑October 1942 by German and Soviet authorities to conduct organised evacuations of civilians from contested sectors.

The 13th Guards Rifle Division included civilian helpers among those involved in evacuation measures, many of whom were children. The division deployed youths to perform tasks such as delivering provisions and ammunition to forward positions, entertaining troops, tending the wounded and carrying mail.

== Aftermath ==
As the war was moved outside of Stalingrad in the spring of 1943, a post hoc restoration operation commenced to restore the city. The returning residences gave it the title of "the City of the Dead", where the streets were then cleared of the corpses of 200,000 servicemen, including the Soviet and German armies. The city itself was so greatly damaged that some proposed to construct a new city elsewhere and leave the ruins as a memorial to the battle. Civilian casualties were estimated to range from 40,000 dead (by Soviet estimates, known to down-play casualties) to up to 235,000 dead.

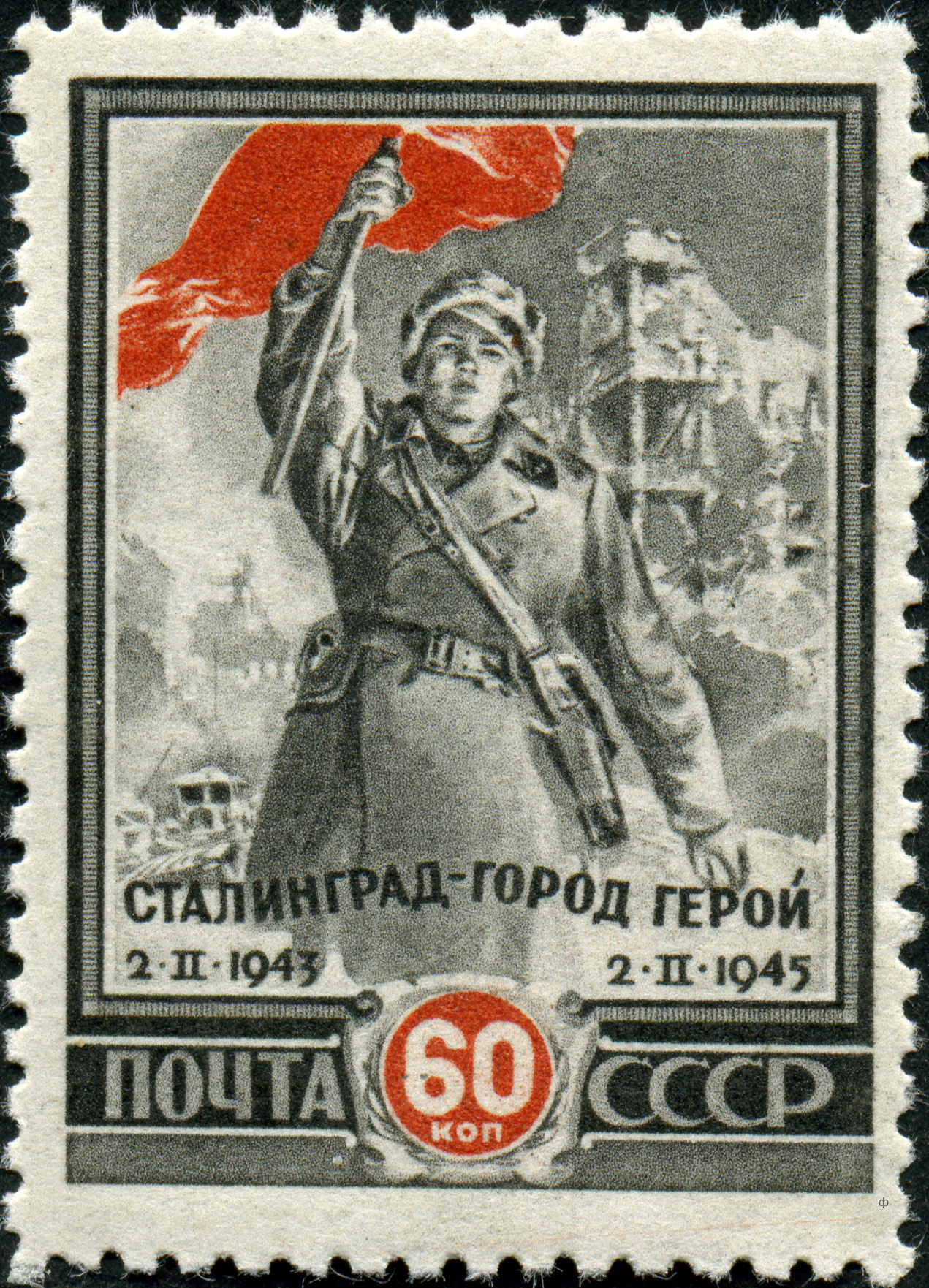
1945 stamp marking the second anniversary of victory at Stalingrad

The battle would ultimately be the costliest (in terms of casualties) urban engagement to ever take place, at least in modern history. Sometimes referred to as a "Pyrrhic victory", the particularly intense close-quarters fighting — often involving hand-to-hand combat — deeply impacted the Soviet consciousness. The brutality would encourage Soviet troops to visit their own brutality on Axis nations in the final stages of the war. The oil fields in the Caucasus region and Nazi Germany's failure to obtain them (and the Soviets holding them) would also have long-term logistical impacts on WWII, particularly on the Eastern Front. Stalingrad was also viewed as a massive propaganda opportunity for the Soviets, with everyday civilians being exhorted as heroes.

The battle would be equally as devastating to the German and Axis nations' consciousness. Many German books and films were created, often portraying "heroic" stands by pockets of German military personnel. However, the battle still entered German consciousness as a crushing defeat and was often seen as a turning point in WWII.
