= Ivan Plotnikov =

Russian engineer and inventor

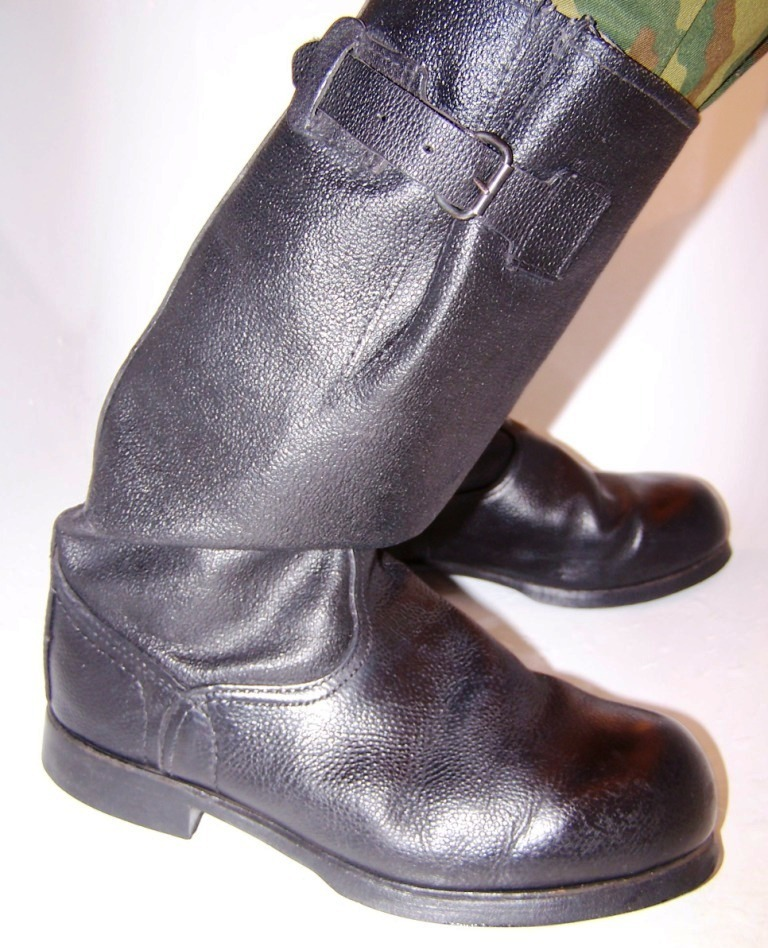
Kirza boots.

Ivan Vasilyevich Plotnikov (Russian: Иван Васильевич Плотников) (1902–1995) was a Soviet engineer and inventor of kirza, a type of artificial leather based on the multi-layer textile fabric, modified by membrana-like substances, a cheap and effective replacement for the natural leather. The material is mainly used in production of military boots and the belts for machinery and automobiles.

Plotnikov worked in the city of Kirov, at the Kirov plant or Kirovskiy Zavod, a fabric producing artificial leather. According to a popular legend, the name kirza is an acronym for Kirovskiy zavod (Kirov factory), a factory producing artificial leather located near Kirov. However, the actual name of the factory was IsKozh (an acronym for "Iskusstvennaya Kozha" - artificial leather), and the legend is simply an example of folk etymology.

The technology was invented in 1935 by Plotnikov and his fellow engineer Khomutov. The mass production began during the Winter War of the Soviet Union against Finland. Initially the material proved to be unfit to the winter conditions, and the production was halted. However, very soon the technology was improved and the mass production was resumed in the autumn and winter of 1941 during the German invasion of Soviet Union, since the large numbers of footwear were badly needed for the Red Army.

For the invention of kirza, Ivan Plotnikov was awarded the Stalin Prize the size of 100,000 rubles on 10 April 1942, as ordered by the Council of People's Commissars of the Soviet Union.
