= Burki boots =

Russian style of boots

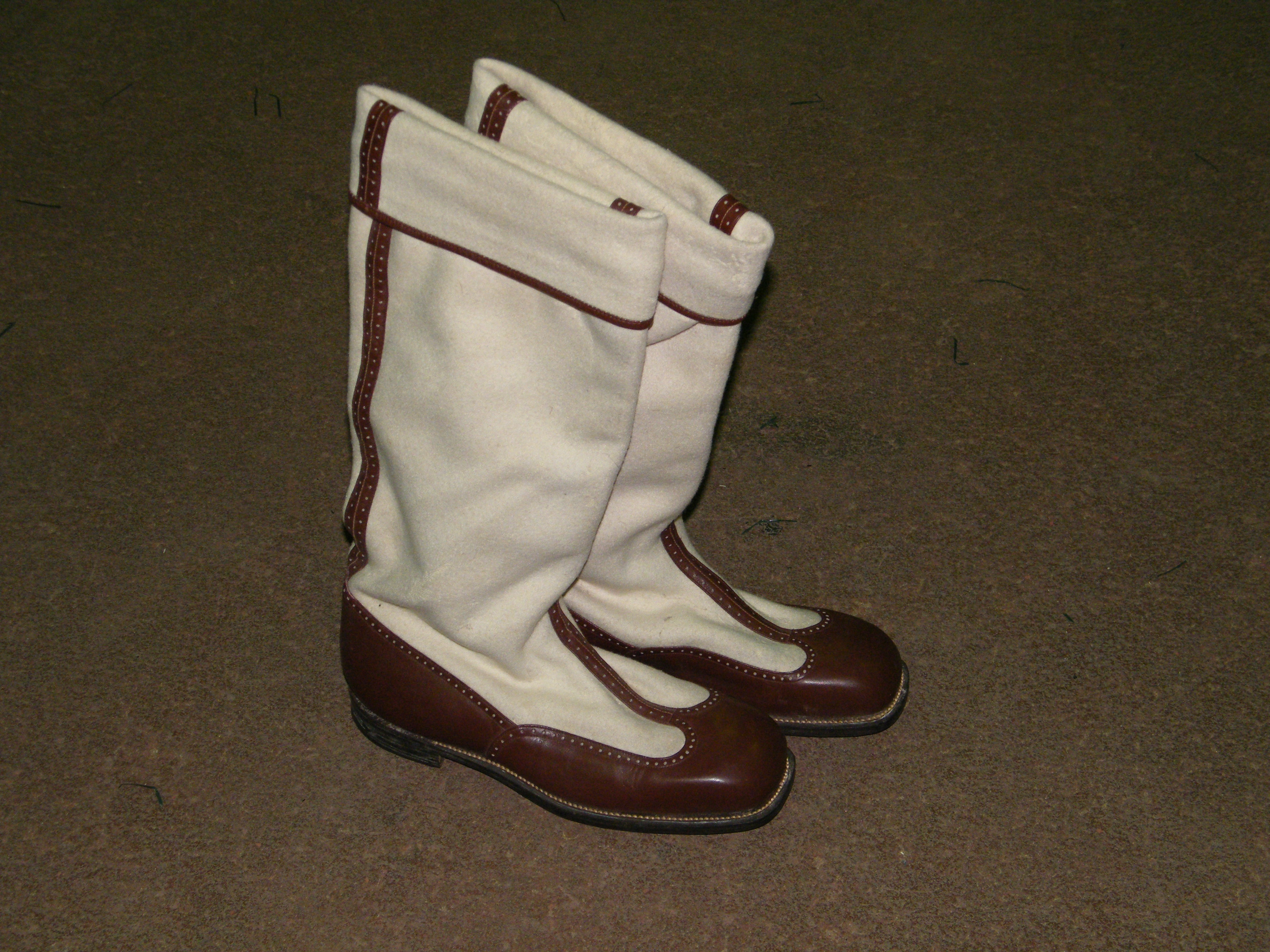
Burki, 1960s

Burki (Russian: Бурки) are high boots in which the bootleg is made of felt, resembling Russian sapogi jackboots in shape.

Invented by the end of the 19th century as a footwear artel in the city of Shklov, Russian Empire (now in Belarus), they were popular in the Soviet Union. In particular, they were part of the winter uniform for high command of the Soviet Army during World War II and later they were an attribute of Soviet nomenklatura.

== See also ==
- Valenki
