= Captured German equipment in Soviet use on the Eastern front =

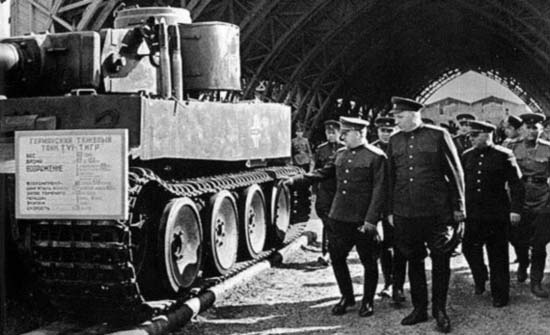
Soviet Marshal Georgy Zhukov and other general staff members inspect a captured German Tiger I heavy tank in 1943.

During World War II, losses of major items of equipment were substantial in many battles all throughout the war. Due to the expense of producing such equipment as replacements, many armies made an effort to recover and re-use enemy equipment that fell into their hands.

== Equipment capture ==
Soviet troops made use of German boots, knives, mess-kits, flashlights and other personal items such as shavers and sidearms. Likewise, German troops often sought Soviet winter boots (vаlenki) and hats. Troops on both sides each favored the other's submachine guns. German troops used Soviet PPSh-41 submachine guns and Red Army troops (and Soviet partisans) used captured German MP-40s.

After the Battle of Stalingrad in 1943, several hundred German Panzer III tanks and similar StuG III assault guns/tank destroyers were captured. A significant effort was made to repair and re-use them due to their widespread availability. More than 100 were rebuilt as the SU-76i self-propelled gun, with some even serving as Soviet SG-122 self-propelled howitzer vehicle prototypes. Besides Panzer IIIs and StuG IIIs, the Soviets also used about a hundred ex-German Panzer IV medium tanks as well as Panther tanks. Tiger I and II tanks seized by the Soviets were only largely used for testing rather than fighting on the frontline.

Nazi Germany fielded a large quantity of their own captured enemy weapons ranging from rifles to tanks. In particular, the German military used a number of T-34/76 tanks which fell into their hands early on in the war, as well as other older and lighter models such as the T-26 and a handful of the KV-series heavy tanks. Captured Soviet rifles and submachine guns were also operated by German soldiers, as were artillery guns of various types, such as the 76mm anti-tank/field gun, that were lost by the Soviet Red Army as they rapidly retreated eastwards all throughout 1941.

== Use of captured equipment ==
Captured equipment was valuable to the Soviets as a source of intelligence on German equipment capabilities and weaknesses. The first examples of German Tiger I tank and Königstiger tanks captured in combat were sent to Soviet proving grounds for evaluation. Photographic evidence does exist of usage of German equipment by the Soviets; they were often only used for a short period of time.

When Axis tanks were captured and could be repaired for use, they were often used in deception operations. A common tactic was for a Soviet tank unit to approach a German position using one or two captured German tanks in the lead. The hope was that the German defenders, recognizing a "friendly" tank, would not fire, or would delay their fire long enough for the Soviet unit to make a close approach.

Axis tanks and other AFVs were also re-marked and sometimes re-armed with Soviet weapons. One such example is the SU-76i assault gun based on captured Panzer III. Evidence also exists of German Panzer I-based command vehicles re-armed with Soviet 20mm ShVAK cannons.

== Example listing of captured equipment ==
=== Captured German armored fighting vehicles ===
- Panzer 38(t) medium tank
- Sd.Kfz. 11 artillery tractor
- Sd.Kfz. 250 armored halftrack
- Panzer IV tank
- Sturmgeschütz III assault gun
- Panzer III tank
- Tiger I tank
- Tiger II tank
- Panther tank
- Sd.Kfz. 301 Borgward
- Panhard 178 ex-French armored car employed by the Germans
- Panzer II light tank
- Panzer I light tank

== Example listing of other Axis vehicles ==
- Hungarian Toldi light tank
- Romanian R-1 tankette
- Romanian R-35 light tank

== Captured aircraft ==
- Bücker Bü 133 Jungmeister
- Dornier Do 215
- Fieseler Fi 156 Storch
- Gotha Go 145
- Focke-Wulf Fw 190
- Focke-Wulf Fw 190 D-9
- Focke-Wulf Fw 189
- Heinkel He 111
- Junkers Ju 87
- Messerschmitt Bf 109
- Henschel Hs 126

== See also ==
- German designations of foreign artillery in World War II
- German designations of foreign firearms in World War II

== Links ==
- Galleries of trophy armour, planes and guns at "War is over" site
