= Jackboot =

Military boot

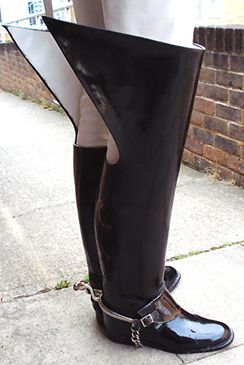
Jackboots of the Household Cavalry, British Army

A jackboot is a military boot such as the cavalry jackboot or the hobnailed jackboot. The hobnailed jackboot has a different design and function from the former type. It is a combat boot designed for marching. It rises to mid-calf or higher without laces and sometimes has a leather sole with hobnails. Jackboots have been associated popularly with totalitarianism, since they were worn by German forces in the run-up to and during World War II.

== Cavalry jackboot ==
The term originally denoted tall 'winged' leather cavalry boots, which were reinforced against sword blows by use of mail sewn into the lining of the leather. The ‘wings’ (backward projections) on these high boots particularly protected a rider's knee-joint from a sword blow. These boots are still worn and still so termed by the Household Cavalry regiment of the British Army, initiated during the 17th century. The term originates from the French word jaque meaning 'coat of mail'. These boots were made very heavy by the mail reinforcement but are slightly less heavy nowadays because modern materials are used as stiffeners. There are now few manufacturers of cavalry jackboots, the most famous being Schnieder Boots of Mayfair, London, the official supplier to the Household Cavalry.

== Hobnailed jackboot ==
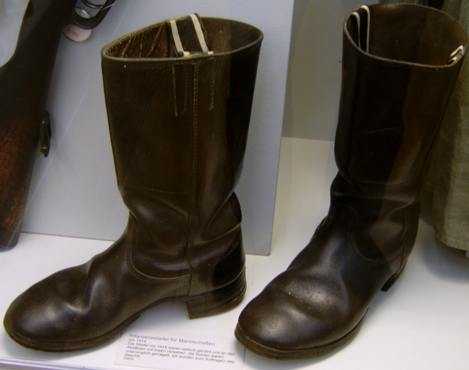
German jackboots from 1914

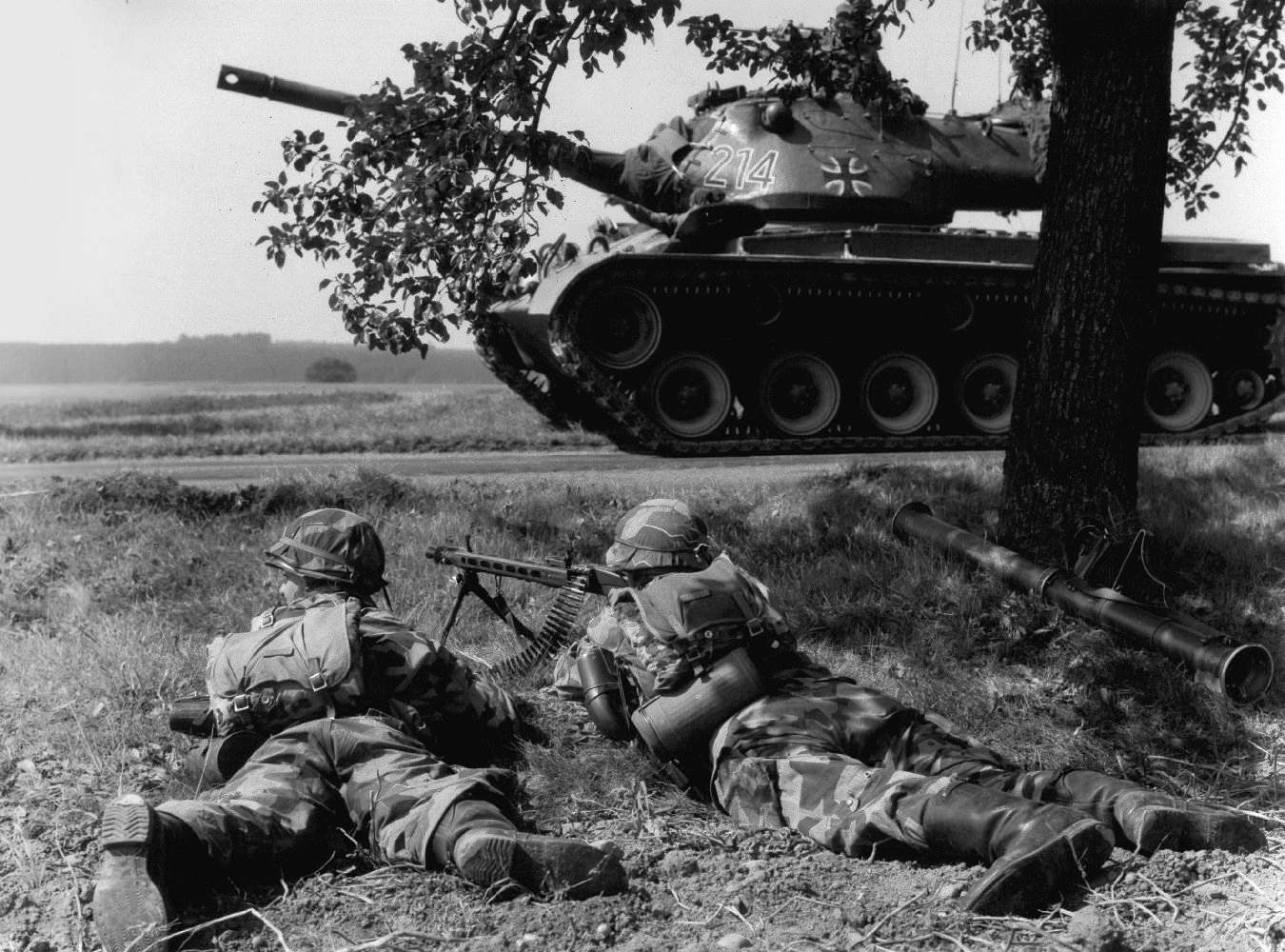
German Bundeswehr soldiers wearing jackboots with an M47 tank in the background, 1960

The second meaning of the term is derived from the first, with reference to their toughness, but is unrelated in design and function, being a combat boot designed for marching, rising to at least mid-calf, with no laces, sometimes a leather sole with hobnails, and heel irons. The Germans term this boot Marschstiefel, meaning "marching boot". This is the classic boot used by the German infantry during World War I, though the stormtroopers dispensed with them in favor of laced boots of a type then used by Austro-Hungarian mountain troops. An etymological source not derived from the cavalry jackboot has been suggested as from the word jack, jacket or jerkin, as a common garment worn by the peasantry.

== As a metaphor ==
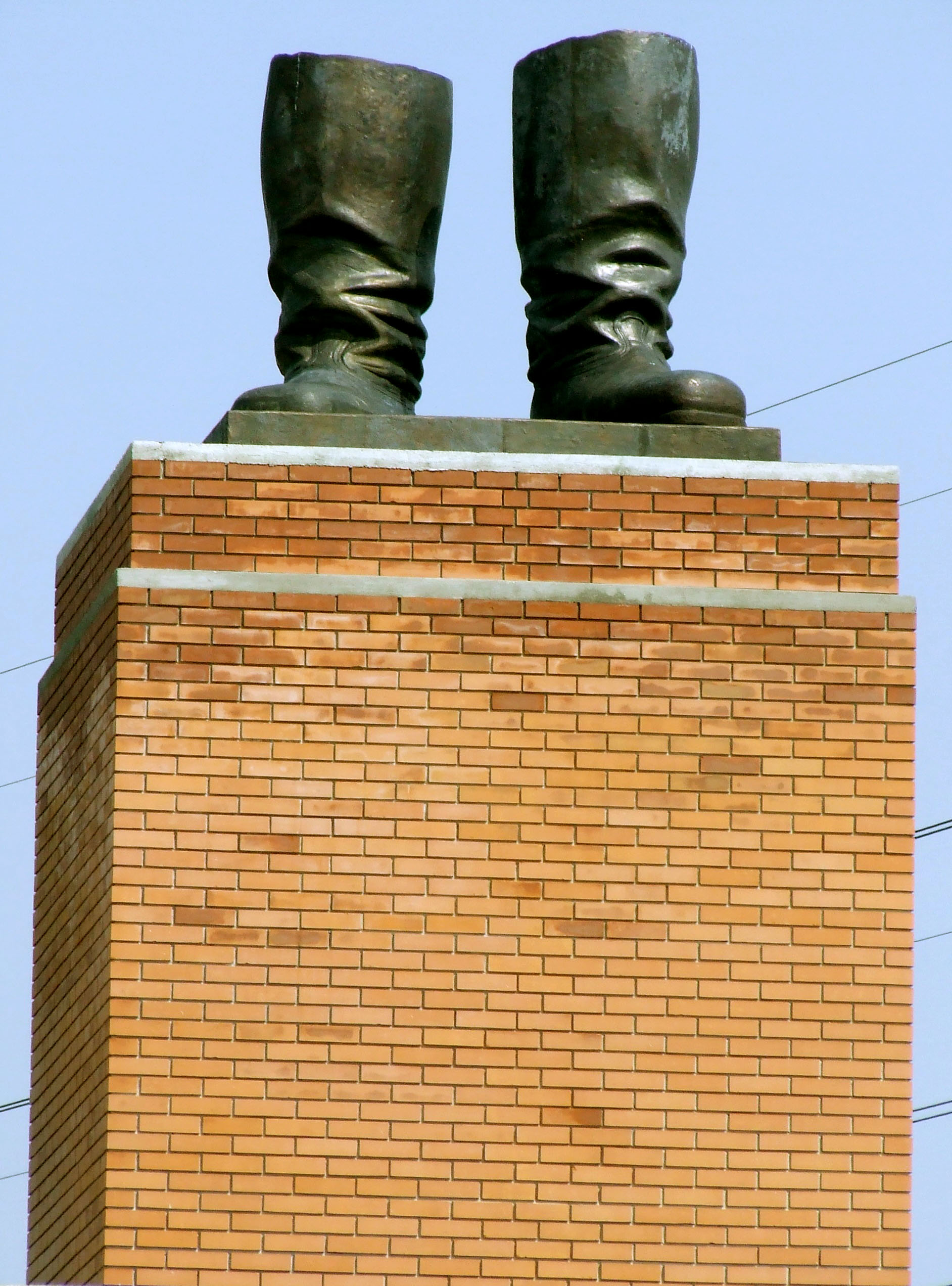
"Stalin's Boots", a monument in Hungary

=== Totalitarianism ===
The boots are associated popularly with fascism, particularly Nazism, as they were worn by the Sturmabteilung and later the field forces of the Wehrmacht and Waffen-SS as part of the World War II German uniform before and even after Germany experienced leather shortages. When goose-stepping on pavement, the large columns of German soldiers in Marschstiefel ("marching boots") created a distinct rock-crushing sound which came to symbolize German conquest and occupation. A similar style of boot had been in use with German armies for World War I, the Franco-Prussian War, and before.

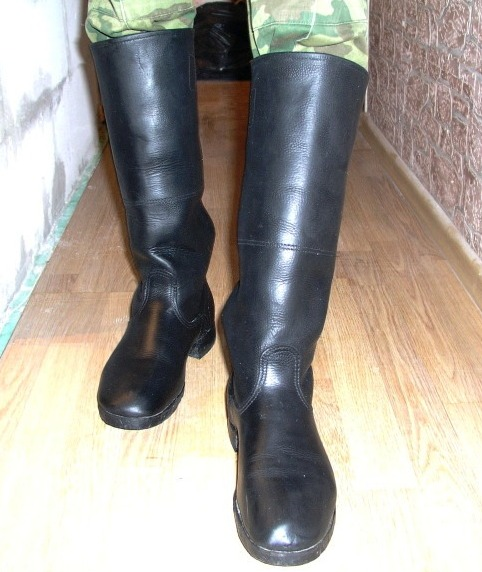
Modern Russian army sapogi

Jackboots were also associated with the armies of the former USSR (called sapogi) and East Germany. Jackboots are still a part of the modern parade and service attire of the armies of Russia and some other states.

The word is used often in English as a metonym and a synecdoche for totalitarianism, particularly fascism.

In the United States in October 1993, the National Rifle Association (NRA) published a four-page advertisement in the center of its magazine American Rifleman, the first page of which showed goose-stepping, jackbooted legs under the question, "What's the First Step to a Police State?" Two years later, the NRA's executive vice-president, Wayne LaPierre, created controversy when he referred to federal agents as "jack-booted thugs" in an NRA fund-raising letter. The term had been invented by United States Representative John Dingell, Democrat of Michigan, in 1981. Such statements prompted former U.S. president George H. W. Bush to resign his membership in the organization soon afterward.

== See also ==
- Riding boot
- Burki boots
- Hessian (boot)
- Kirza
- Footwraps
- Thigh-high boots
- List of boots
- List of shoe styles
