= OKZK cap =

Soviet Era field cap

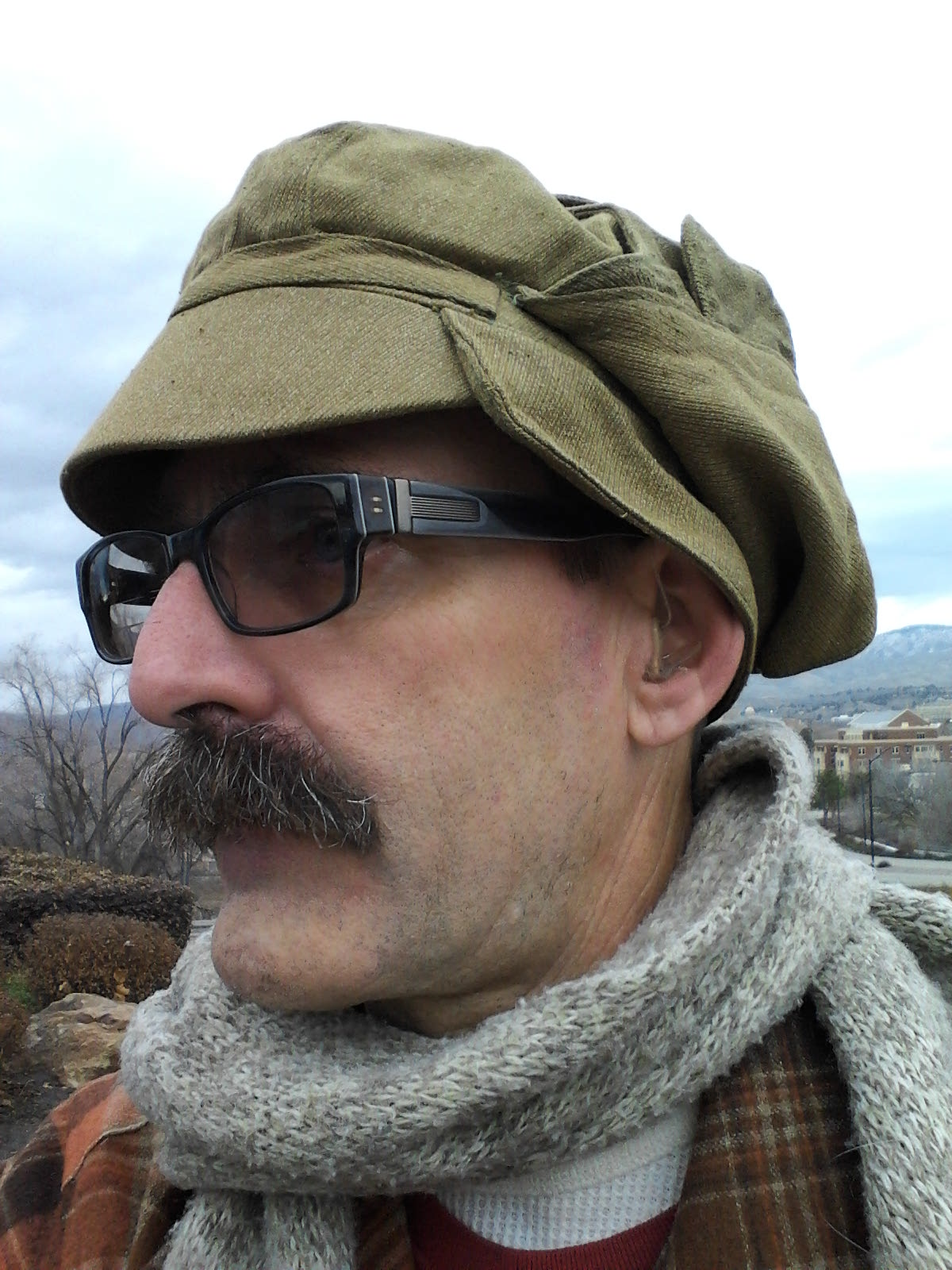
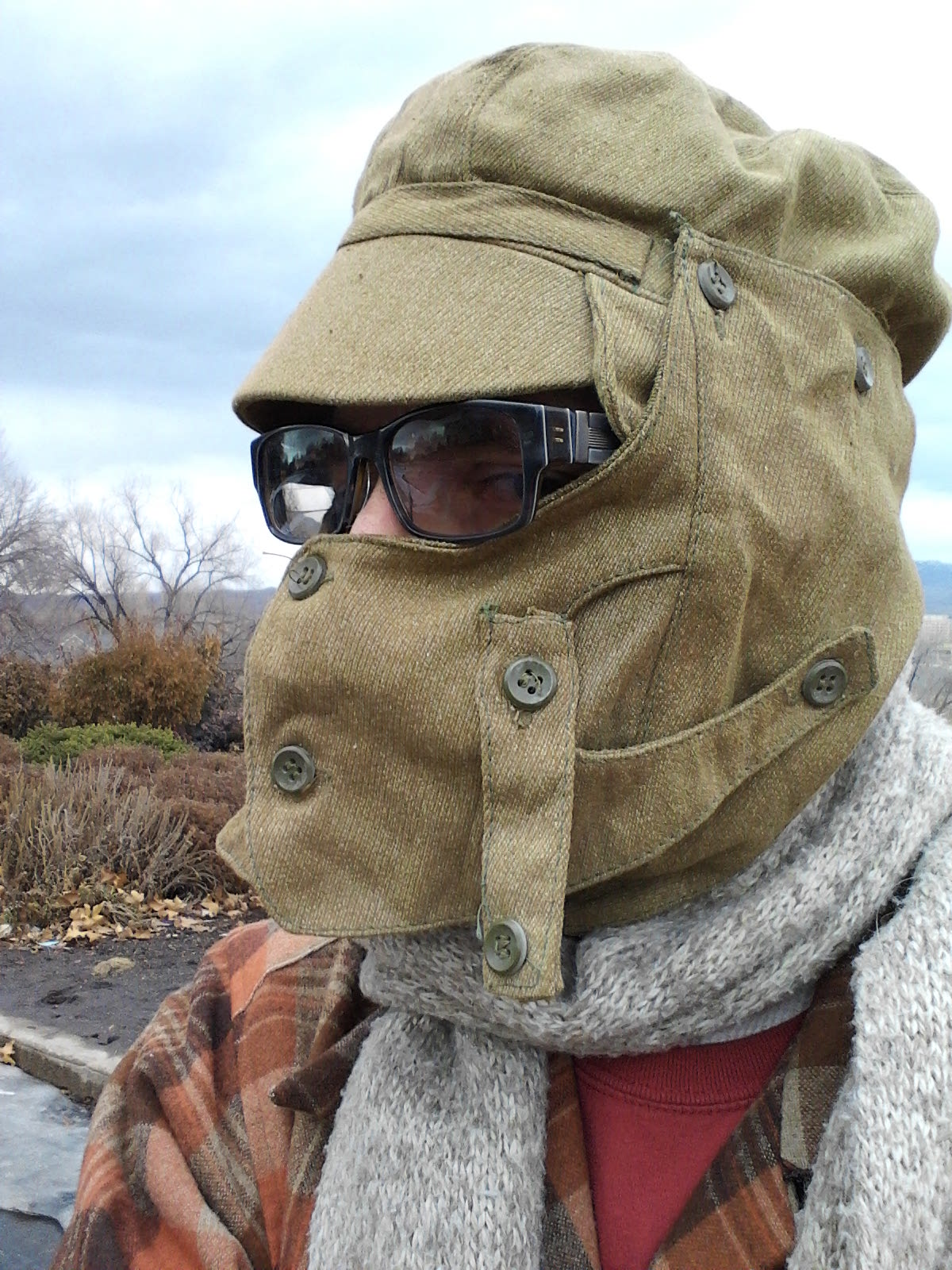
Ways of wearing the OKZK cap

The OKZK cap is a balaclava-like khaki field cap that was issued by the Soviet Army as part of the NBC suit OKZK (Russian: общевойсковой комплексный защитный костюм, lit. 'combined arms complex protective suit').

== Structure ==
The OKZK cap is made of a thick cotton fabric that includes a layer of fabric impregnated with a chemical absorbent. The back of the cap has a buttoning system to attach a protective veil that can also be buttoned up. Keeping in line with its intended NBC purpose, the left side of the veil has a button held opening that is meant to enable the connection of a gas mask filter, should the wearer want to use one in conjunction with the cap. This opening allowed it to be compatible with a number of different protective gear including: the PMK gas mask, the R-2 half-mask respirator, and a pair of flash protective OPF goggles.

== Usage ==
In reality, the cap was always used along with the OKZK uniform by drivers and chemical corps. It was later issued to civil defense depots, seeing use by liquidator cleanup crews during the Chernobyl disaster response.

It is often erroneously referred to as "Syriyka" or "kepka Afghanka" in English-speaking countries, coming directly from erroneous commercial names and the belief that they were first issued for overseas use in desert or tropical climates such as Syria, Angola, Vietnam, and Cuba, and eventually during the earliest stages of the Soviet–Afghan War.

== See also ==
- Afghanka
- List of hat styles
