= Telogreika =

Variety of Russian warm cotton wool-padded jacket

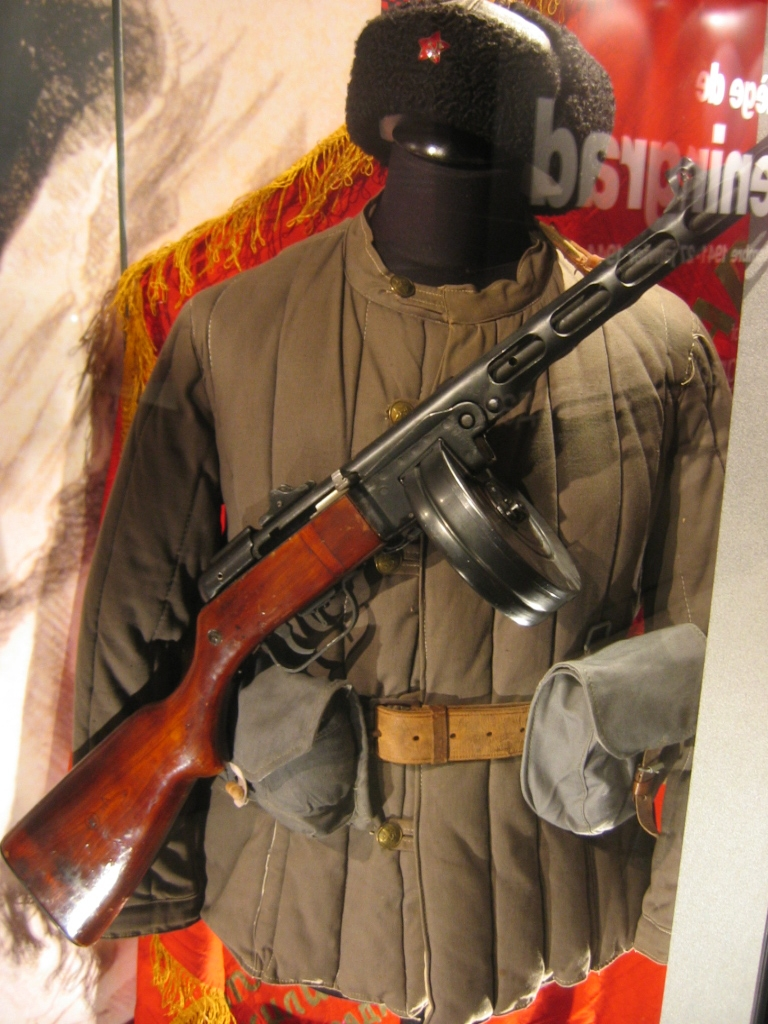
World War II-era Red Army winter uniform consisting of a telogreika and an ushanka.

A telogreika (Russian: телогре́йка, lit. 'body warmer', IPA: [tʲɪlɐˈgrʲejkə]), also known as a vatnik (ватник, [ˈvatnʲɪk]) or fufayka (фуфайка) is a variety of quilted jacket from the Soviet Union. It is a cotton wool–padded, waterproof jacket often worn with valenki, winter trousers, and an ushanka to keep its wearer warm. The telogreika was part of the winter uniform of the Red Army from the 1930s to 1960s, and used extensively during the Winter War and World War II.

== Description ==
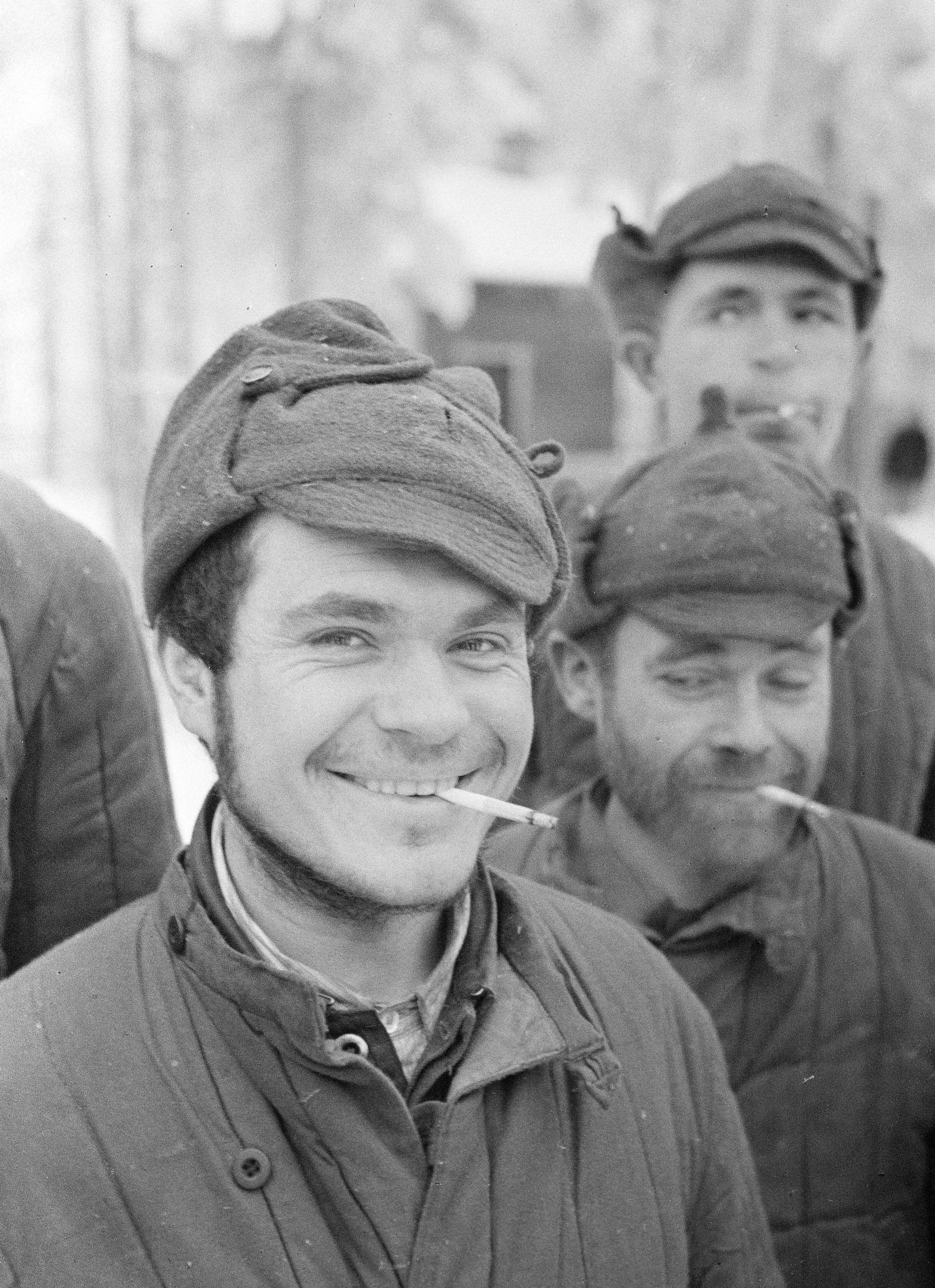
Soviet prisoners of war captured during the Winter War, with issued telogreikas.

The telogreika were inspired by similar jackets known as teplushki that had evolved in the Imperial Russian Army during the late 19th and early 20th centuries. The basic cut the uniform followed was that of a quilted jacket to compliment quilted trousers. The jacket and trousers usually had a ribbed design with the quilting, although this feature was absent on many of the non-Soviet issue uniforms. The telogreika jackets usually had a single pocket on the front, while the trousers usually had pockets on the hip and a button pocket on the front of the trouser leg. Jackets buttoned up the front and the sleeves buttoned closed, while the trousers had a button fly and were tied at the bottom of the legs. Early issue variants had high collars, though these were absent later on.

Telogreika were usually khaki in colour, although black uniforms were issued to tank crews, and some grey variants can be seen, sewn of cotton (and later polyester-blend) fabric with a cotton wool batting inside.

== Issue ==
The telogreika was first introduced in the early 1930s, during a period of reform in the Red Army which saw changes to uniform and equipment. Early versions of the telogreika were generally of poor quality, but an improved version resembling a modern wool jacket in shape and cut was issued extensively from 1935 to 1941. A simplified version was introduced from 1941 onwards. A telogreika was often issued along with a shinel (a type of Russian-style greatcoat) and initially a budenovka hat, later replaced with the pilotka and ushanka hats.

The telogreika faded from military issue in the 1960s, being largely replaced by the return of the old woolen shinel greatcoat and the new bushlat (pea coat) of the M69 uniform. Inexpensive and extremely easy to produce, they were also manufactured for the civilian market until 1959. Today, the telogreika is still used in the civilian market in Russia and many former Eastern Bloc countries. In Russia, it remains popular among night watchmen, construction workers and the homeless.

== See also ==
- Gambeson, medieval padded defensive jacket
- Vatnik, a political insult derived from the name of the jacket

== Sources ==
- Békési, László (2006). Stalin's War: Soviet Uniforms & Militaria 1941–45 in Colour Photographs. Photographs by György Török. Ramsbury, Marlborough, UK: The Crowood Press. ISBN 1-86126-822-X.
- Zaloga, Steven J. (1984). The Red Army of the Great Patriotic War, 1941–45. Men-at-Arms 216. Colour plates by Ron Volstad. Oxford: Osprey Publishing. ISBN 0-85045-939-7.
