= Kirza =

Type of artificial leather

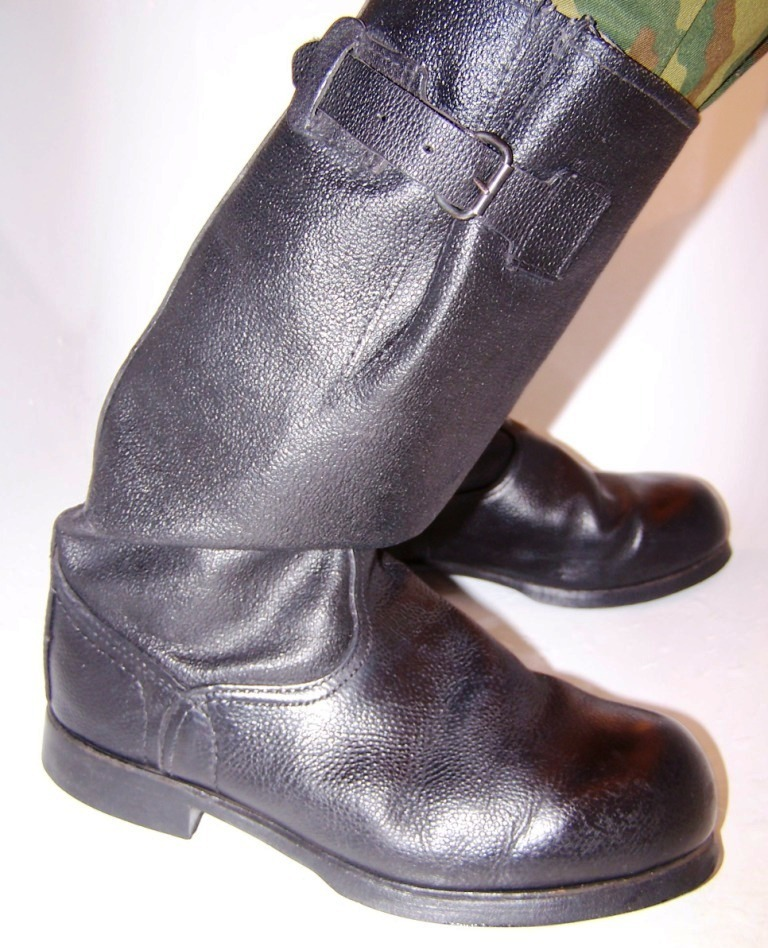
Kirza boots

Kirza (Russian: кирза) is an early Russian type of artificial leather based on a multi-layer textile fabric, modified by membrane-like substances. It consisted of cotton, latex and rosin. It was produced mainly in the Soviet Union. The surface of kirza imitates pig leather.

The material is mainly used in the production of military boots, where it is a cheap and effective replacement for natural leather. It is also used in the production of belts for machinery and automobiles. The Kirza SK high boots were named by soldiers as 'shit trampers'. It is also used in holsters.

== Etymology ==
While some English dictionaries translate кирза as kersey, this is incorrect, as kersey is a material of natural origin known since the Middle Ages. However, kersey was used in the production of the first kirza. According to a popular legend, the name kirza is an acronym for Kirovskiy zavod (Kirov factory), a factory producing artificial leather located near Kirov. However, the actual name of the factory was IsKozh (an acronym for "Iskusstvennaya Kozha" - artificial leather), and the legend is simply an example of folk etymology.

== History ==
In 1904, Mikhail Pomortsev invented the original leather substitute. He used a mixture of egg yolk, rosin and paraffin wax to impregnate kersey. Despite receiving several awards in Russia and abroad, it was not used due to lobbying by leather boot manufacturers. It remained expensive, despite the demand, until the invention of synthetic latex in the early 1930s which replaced the initial impregnating mixture.

During 1920s and 1930s, Aleksandr M. Khomutov and Ivan Plotnikov developed a new material called Kirza SK. Kirza SK is a pig leather imitation based on multi-layer coarse cotton fabric, impregnated by a film-forming synthetic rubber type substance involving a vacuum manufacturing process, which produced a fabric that is impervious to water, yet with a breathable membrane to let air through. Kirza was first used in 1936-1937 and authorized to replace leather goods in 1940. The Red Army trialed boots with kirza SK uppers during the Winter War but it proved unfit for winter conditions, and production was halted.

In 1941, as technology improved, mass production was resumed to meet demand for army boots during the German invasion of the Soviet Union. Plotnikov became the chief engineer for the supply of kirza SK boots to the army.

On 10 April 1942, Aleksandr Khomutov, Ivan Plotnikov and seven other specialists were awarded the 2nd Degree Stalin Prize for their invention of the new kirza production technology.

By the end of the war, an estimated ten million Soviet soldiers were wearing kirza boots.

Kirza has remained in production in Russia and in several other countries. About 85% of the kirza produced in Russia is used in military boots (including modern combat boots). Most modern kirza boots are produced from a combination of 85% kirza and 15% of specially prepared natural leather (the so-called yuft or Russia leather). About 150 million pairs of kirza footwear have been produced up to the present day.

== See also ==
- Jackboot
- Footwraps
- Puttee
