= Valenki =

Traditional Russian footwear

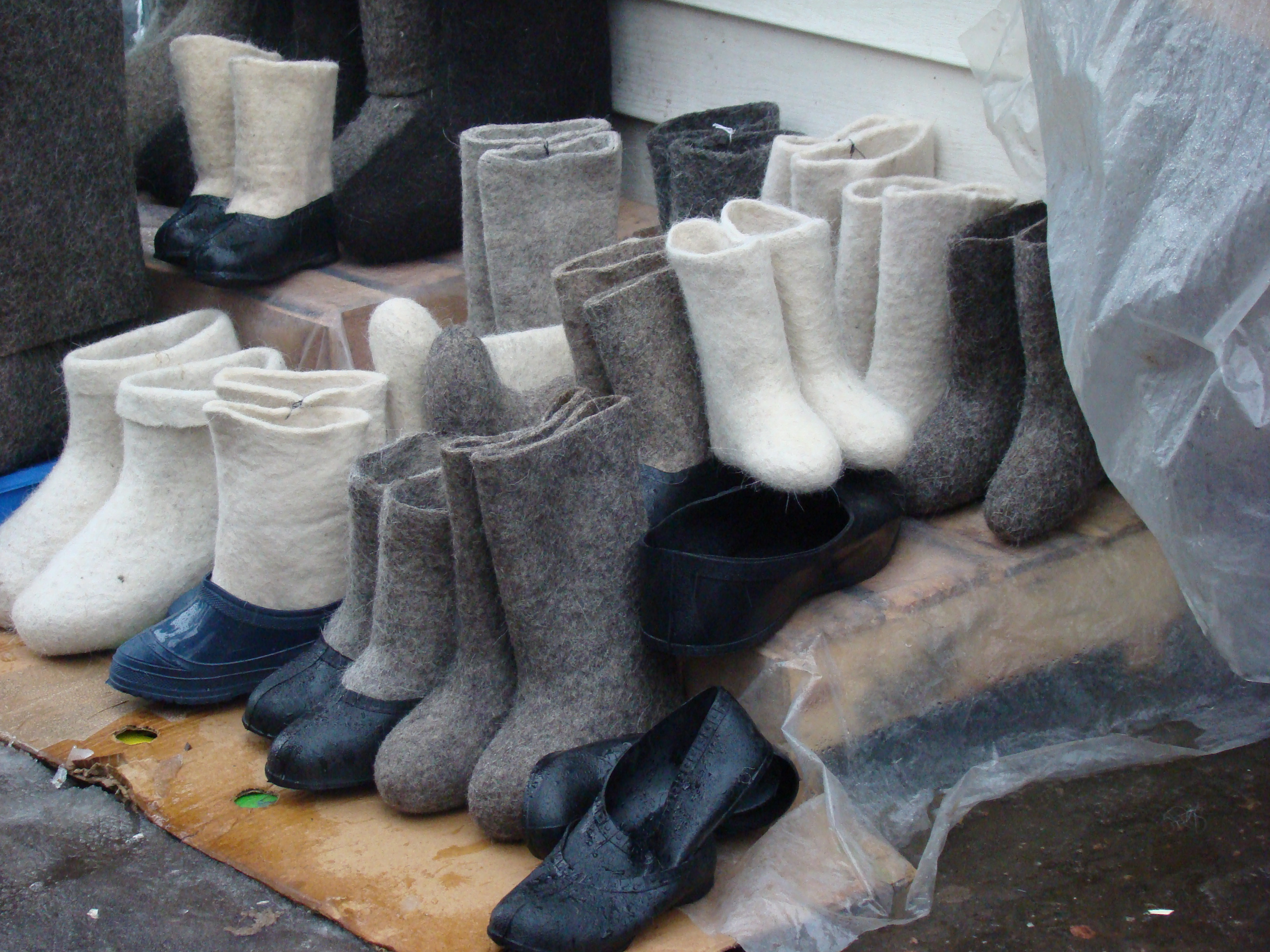
Russian valenki

Valenki (Russian: ва́ленки, [ˈvalʲɪnkʲɪ]; sg. valenok; Russian: ва́ленок, [ˈvalʲɪnək]) are traditional Russian winter boots without outer soles. They are essentially felt boots: the name valenok literally means "made by felting" in Russian. They are not water-resistant, and are often worn with galoshes to protect the soles from wear and moisture. They are regarded as the Russian national footwear and they still remain popular in parts of the country, especially Siberia, as well as in Belarus and Ukraine.

== Description ==
Valenki are usually worn for walking on dry snow in frosty weather. In order to prevent wear, the boots are often soled with leather, rubber or another durable material or worn with galoshes. Traditionally, valenki come in brown, black, gray and white, however, modern versions are often dyed or produced from colored artificial materials.

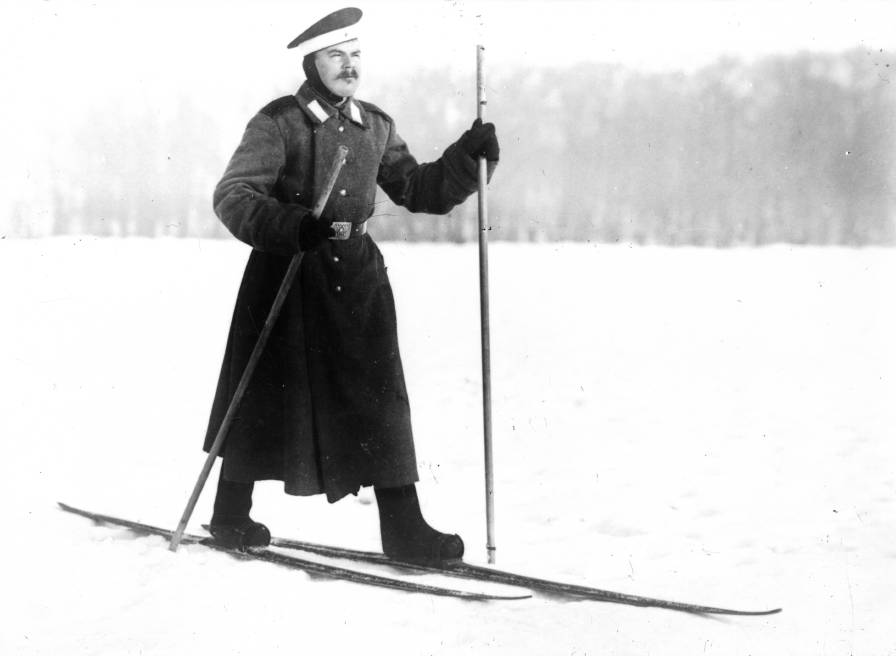
Imperial Russian soldier on skis wearing valenki (1900s)

The use of felted footwear has been known for millennia, felt shoes have been found in Iron Age Siberian burials. The origin of valenki has been speculated to trace back to the traditional felt boots worn by nomads of the Great Steppe. The first modern valenki appeared in the early eighteenth century and became more widespread as Russian industrialization progressed, becoming cheaper and more accessible.

Before the Russian Revolution, the production of valenki on industrial scale was concentrated in the Semenov district of Nizhny Novgorod province, in the Kineshma District of Kostroma province, and in the Kukmor in Kazan province. In 1900, contemporary jackboot fulling factories of Russia produced 1.4 million pairs of valenki for the value of 2.1 million rubles. In 1900, a pair of valenki cost 1.5 rubles, in 1912, 2 rubles, and at the end of 1916 the speculative price reached up to 12–18 rubles per pair.

Valenki have become less popular in urban life since the middle of the twentieth century, as human activity has softened the winters in cities, requiring lighter and more waterproof footwear. In modern media, valenki are seen as a rustic, old-fashioned style of clothing; in cities they are usually worn by small children, or during especially severe frost. Valenki are included in the standard equipment of parts of the internal military service of the Russian army. Although they have fallen out of use in some parts of the country, they are especially popular in Siberia.

== See also ==
- Afghanka
- Burki boots
- List of boots
- List of shoe styles
- Telogreika
- Ushanka

== General and cited references ==
- Forrester, Sibelan (28 October 2013). "Valenki". In Smorodinskaya, Tatiana; Evans-Romaine, Karen; Goscilo, Helena (eds.). Encyclopedia of Contemporary Russian Culture. Routledge. pp. 187–188. ISBN 978-1-136-78785-0.
- Békési, László (2006). Stalin's War: Soviet Uniforms and Militaria 1941–45. Ramsbury, UK: The Crowood Press. ISBN 1-86126-822-X.
- Zaloga, Steven J. (1989). The Red Army of the Great Patriotic War, 1941–45. London: Osprey. ISBN 0-85045-939-7.
