= Podvorotnichok =

Undercollar for military uniforms

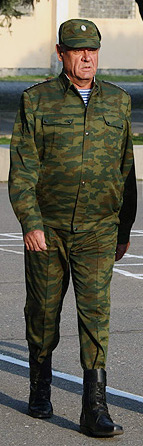
General Vladimir Boldyrev wearing a general officer's Flora pattern field uniform with visible podvorotnichok.

A podvorotnichok (Russian: подворотничок, lit. 'undercollar'; [pədvərətʲnʲɪˈt͡ɕɵk]) is a type of sewn detachable collar used on the inside of collars of military uniforms that originated in Russia. It is a soft white fabric sewn into the inside of a collar to alleviate chafing and rashes, and to reduce wear and tear on the collar. Podvorotnichoks were widely used by the Soviet Armed Forces, the Russian Armed Forces and the militaries of some other Post-Soviet states, and have been introduced into some civilian clothing.

== History ==
Podvorotnichoks were introduced in Russia in the early 20th century, but were based on similar white "undercollars" used in other military uniforms in Europe since the Early Modern period. They were particularly worn for comfort with high-collared greatcoats and tunics, made from coarse durable materials, to prevent the collar from rubbing on the wearer's neck. Undercollars were utilised for sanitary purposes due to advances in military medicine and the understanding of infection, in order to prevent soldiers from contracting diseases via chafed skin from the filth on the battlefield. Podvorotnichoks were usually made from bleached calico and they were changed daily, typically in the evening before lights out, and checked during morning inspection. If a soldier's podvorotnichok was not perfectly white or sewn correctly, he could be punished and made to resew it, as stains or incorrect sewing were seen as a potential hygiene issue.

The modern podvorotnichok was first made mandatory on uniforms of the Soviet Armed Forces on 13 February 1935. Their use was highly regulated by military authorities, but it was relatively common for soldiers to violate these regulations at risk of punishment, and a number of rituals emerged. More experienced soldiers would make visible alterations to their podvorotnichok as a status symbol. During the Brezhnev Stagnation, a practice developed among second-year Soviet Army soldiers to line their podvorotnichok with polyvinyl chloride insulation from electrical wires, making them appear larger than those of new recruits. Soldiers granted a discharge would openly use non-regulation thread and fabric, or sew in the number of days until their demobilisation.

=== Discontinuation ===
Following the dissolution of the Soviet Union in 1991, the podvorotnichok continued to be used by the militaries of some Post-Soviet states, while others have discontinued them.

In the 2010s, the Russian Armed Forces has phased out the use of podvorotnichoks and footwraps with the introduction of VKPO uniform. The podvorotnichok has not been mentioned in the Russian Armed Forces uniform list since the signing of Decree 300 by Defense Minister Sergei Shoigu on 22 June 2015.

== Sources ==
- Soviet Uniforms and Militaria 1917–1991, by László Békesi
- Inside the Soviet Army Today: Osprey Elite Military History Series No. 12, by Stephen J. Zaloga
