= Organ shoes =

Special shoes for organists to allow feet to easily slide between pedals when playing

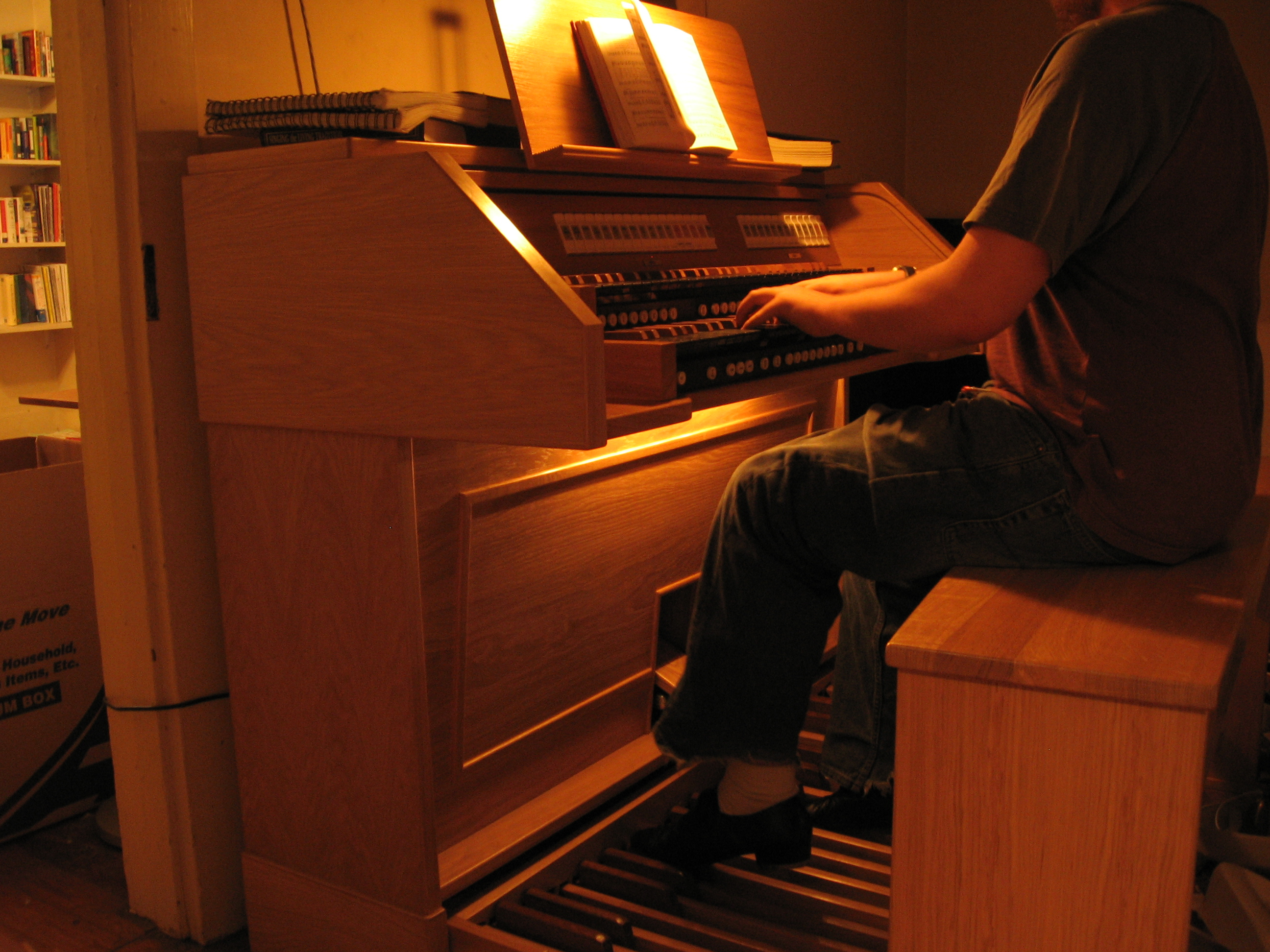
Organist wearing organ shoes (January 2007)

Organ shoes are shoes worn by organists designed to facilitate playing of the organ pedal keyboard. Since organ shoes are worn only at the organ, the use of special footwear also avoids picking up grit or grime that could scar or stain the pedal keys.

== Description ==
Organ shoes are typically as narrow as comfortably possible to prevent accidental playing of more than one pedal key at a time. They usually have both leather soles and leather heels that are glued into place (rather than stitched) which allow the organist to slide the feet along and across the pedals easily.

The soles should be thin enough to feel the pedal key surfaces reasonably easily, but sufficiently stiff for solid and secure playing contact with the pedal keys. Organ shoes typically have a slightly higher heel than usual (about one inch) to ease playing some notes with the heel and others with the toe, and to allow non adjacent notes to be played at once by one foot.

== See also ==
- List of shoe styles
