= List of shoe styles =

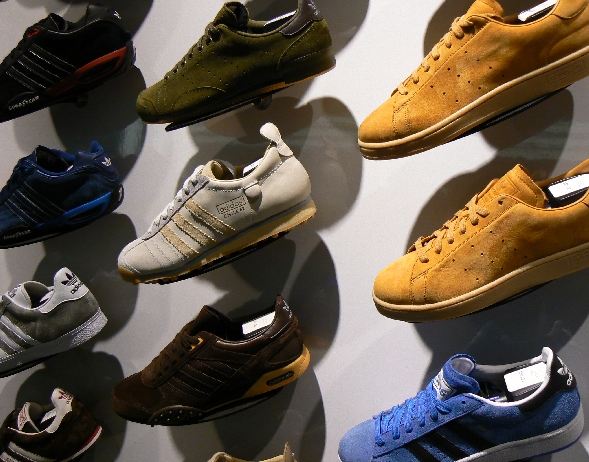
Sneakers

This is a list of shoe styles and designs. A shoe is an item of footwear intended to protect and comfort the human foot while doing various activities. Shoes are also used as an item of decoration. The design of shoes has varied enormously through time and from culture to culture, with appearance originally being tied to function. Additionally, fashion has often dictated many design elements, such as whether shoes have very high heels or flat ones. Contemporary footwear varies widely in style, complexity, and cost. Shoemaking is the process of making footwear. Originally, shoes were made one at a time by hand. Traditional handicraft shoemaking has now been largely superseded in volume of shoes produced by industrial mass production of footwear, but not necessarily in quality, attention to detail, or craftsmanship.

== Shoe styles ==
Shoe designers have described a very large number of shoe styles, including the following:

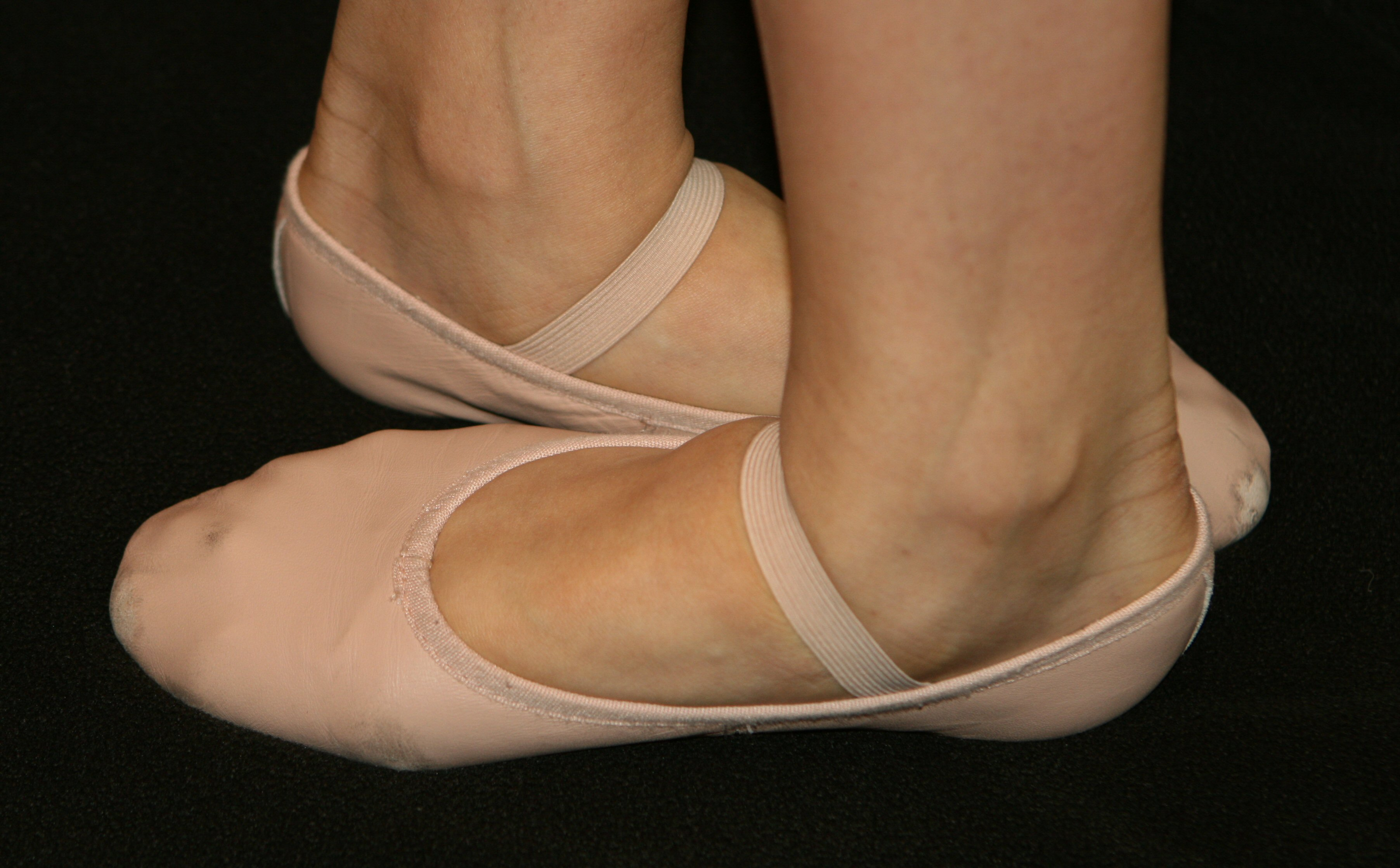
Leather ballet shoes, with feet shown in fifth position.

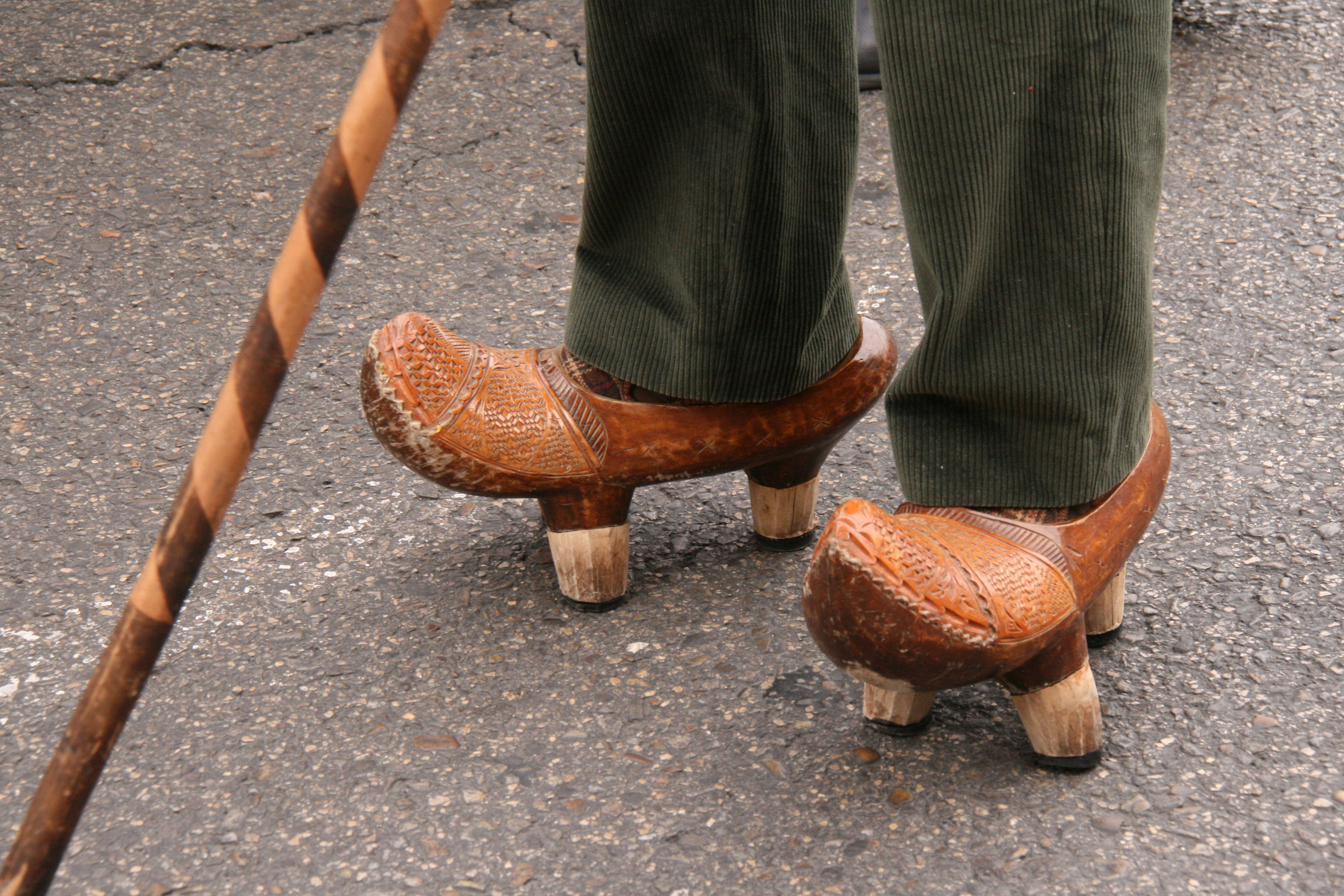
A cantabrian albarca is a rustic wooden shoe in one piece, which has been used particularly by the peasants of Cantabria, northern Spain.

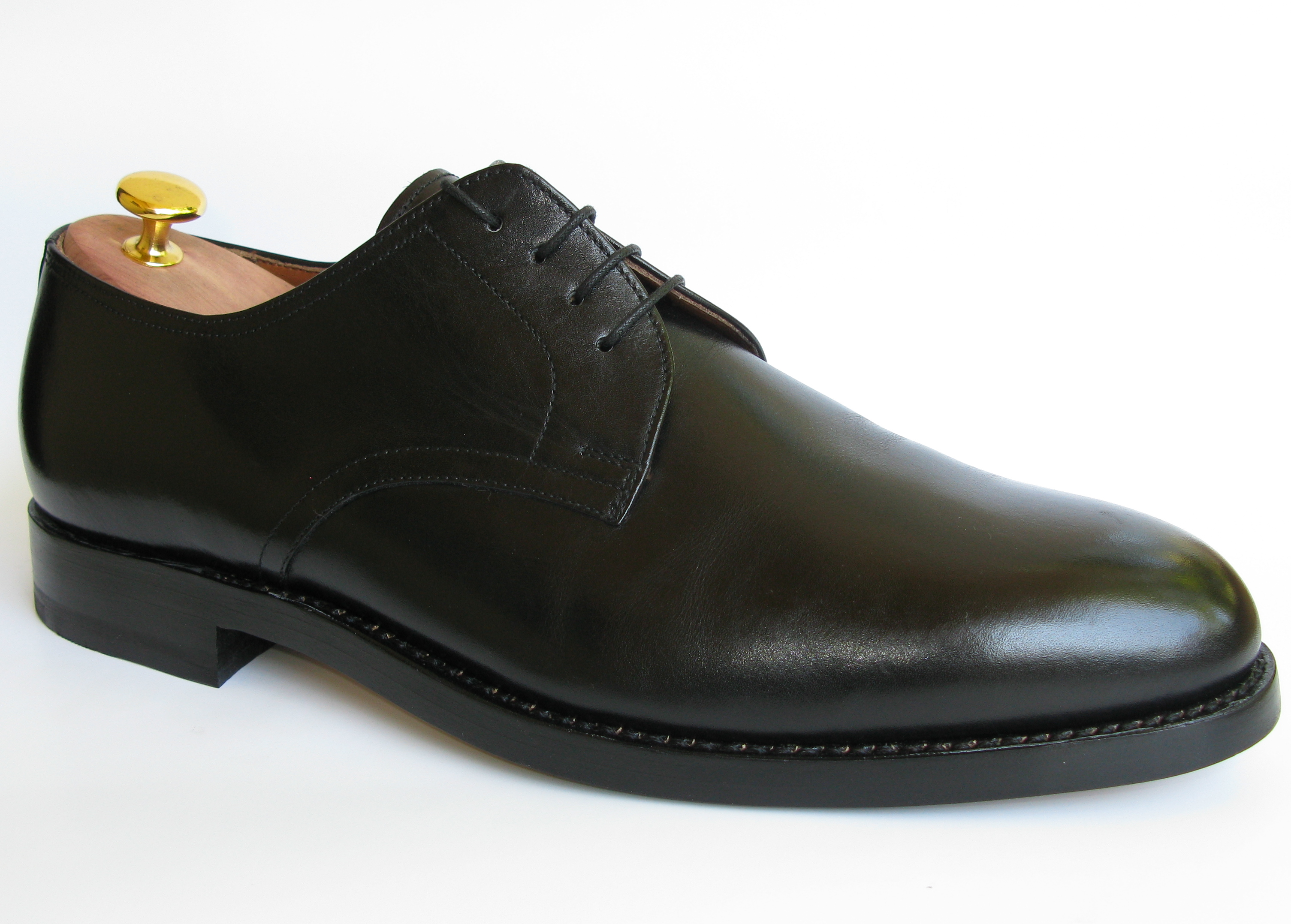
A black derby shoe with a Goodyear welt and leather sole

- Abaca slippers
- Abarka
- Approach shoe
- Avarca
- Bakya
- Balgha
- Ballet boot
- Ballet flat
- Ballet shoe
  - Pointe shoe
- Balmoral
- Bast shoe
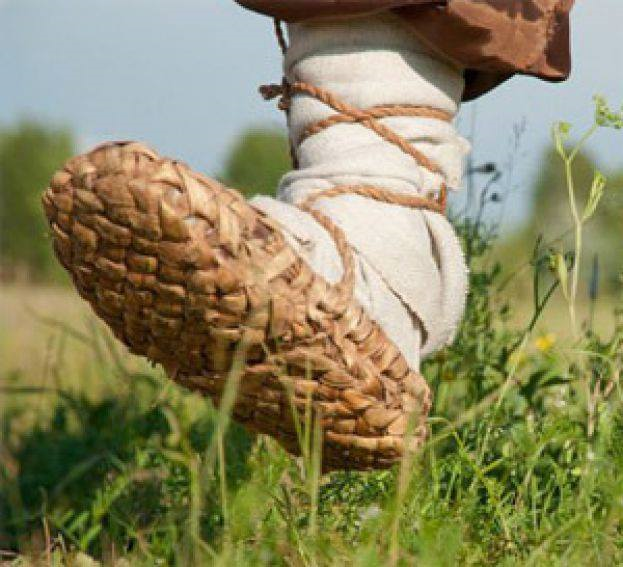
  Bast shoe
- Blucher
- Boat shoe
- Boot
  - Australian work
  - Beatle
  - Bovver
  - Caulk
  - Cavalier
  - Chap
  - Chelsea
  - Chukka
    - Desert
  - Combat
    - Desert combat
    - Jungle
  - Cowboy
  - Dress
  - Engineer
  - Fashion
  - Galoshes
  - Gladiator sandals
  - Go-go boots
  - Hessian
  - Hiking
  - Hip
  - Hwa
  - Jackboot
  - Jodhpur
  - Jump
  - Knee-high
  - Motorcycle boot
  - Mountaineering
  - Rigger
  - Safari
  - Sailing boots
  - Sheepskin
  - Thigh-high
  - Tzangion
  - Ugg
  - Wellington boot (Gumboot)
- Brogan
- Brogue
- Brothel creeper
- Buskin
- Caligae
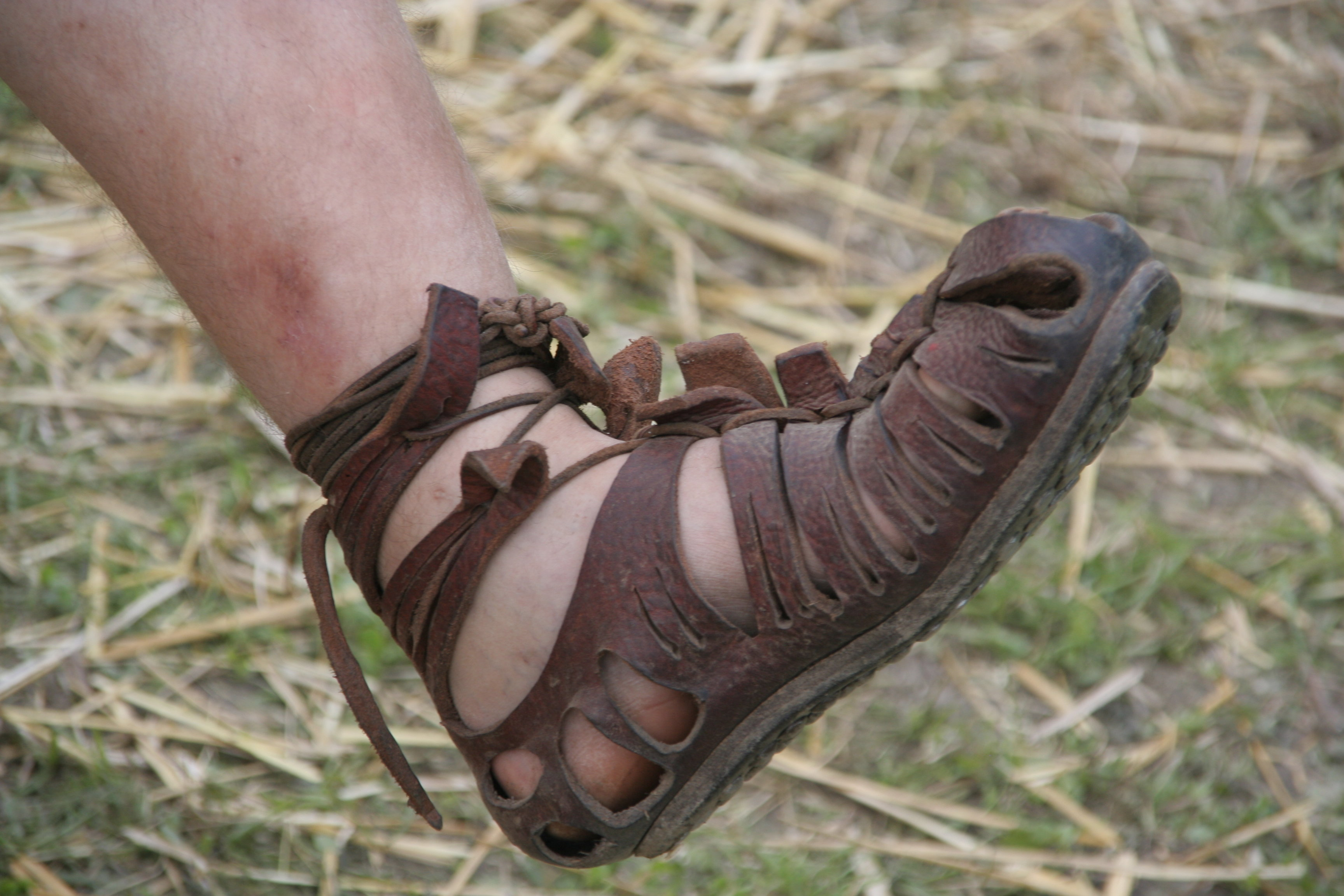
  Reproduction caliga, made from a single piece of leather, plus an outsole added with shoe tacks
- Calceus
- Cantabrian albarcas
- Chopine
- Ciocia
- Cleats
  - Football boots
  - Track spikes
- Climbing shoe
- Clog
  - British clog
  - Turkish clogs
- Court shoe (British English), pump (American English), or d'Orsay pumps
- Crocs
- Cross country running shoe
- Cycling shoe
- Derby
- Diabetic shoe
- Dress shoe
- Duckbill
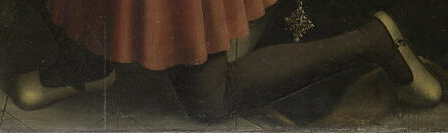
  Duckbill shoes
- Driving moccasins
- Earth shoe
- Elevator shoes
- Episcopal sandals
- Espadrille
- Flamenco shoe
- Furlane
- Galesh
- Ghillies
- Giveh
- Gomusin
- Haferlschuh
- Hanfu footwear
- High-heeled footwear
  - Clear heels
  - Stiletto heel
- High-top
- Hiking shoes
- Huarache
- Jazz shoe
- Jelly shoes
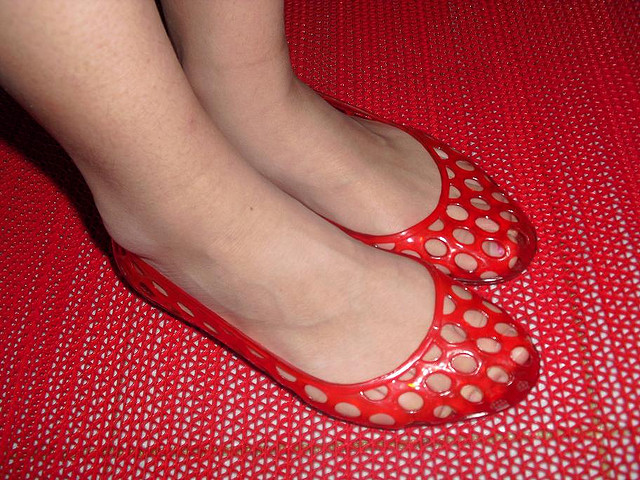
  Jelly shoes
- Jika-tabi
- Jipsin
- Jutti
- Kitten heel
- Klomp
- Kolhapuri chappal
- Kung fu shoe
- Light-up shoes
- Loafer, see Slip-on
- Lotus shoes
- Mary Jane
- Mexican pointy boots
- Mojari
- Moccasin
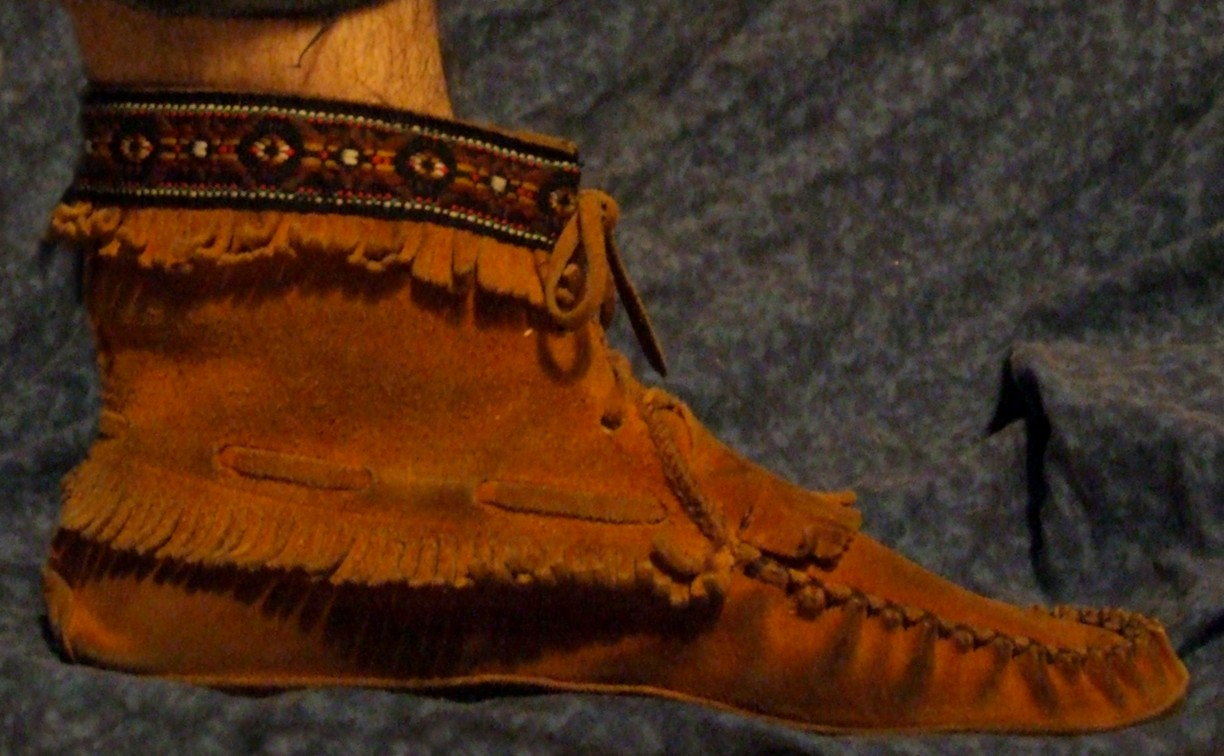
  A soft-soled moccasin
- Monk shoe
- Mukluk
- Mule
- Multani Khussa
- Namaksin
- Okobo
- Opanak
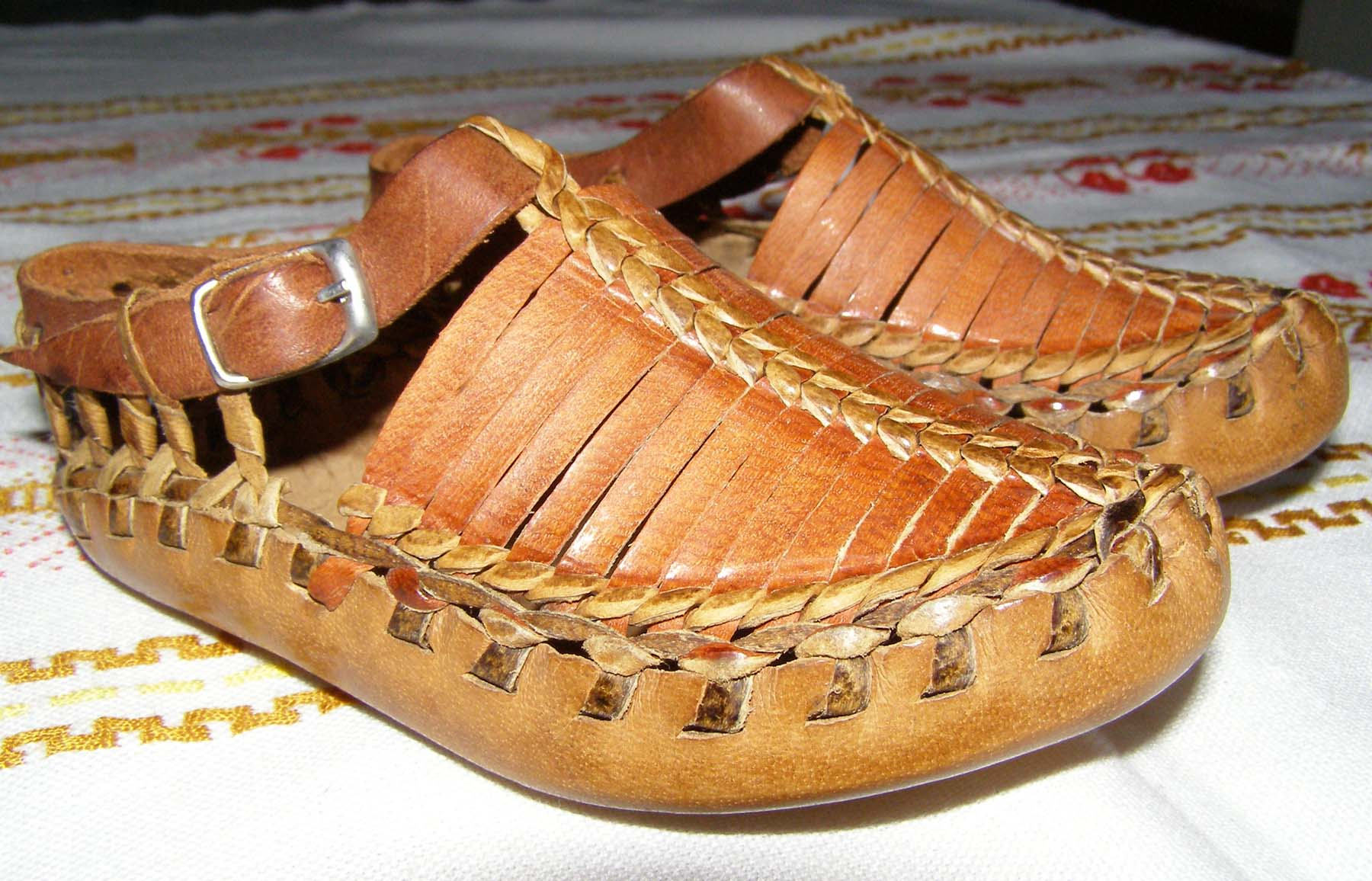
  Opanaks
- Opinga
- Organ shoes
- Orthopaedic footwear
- Over-the-knee boot
- Oxford shoe
  - Wholecut
- Paduka
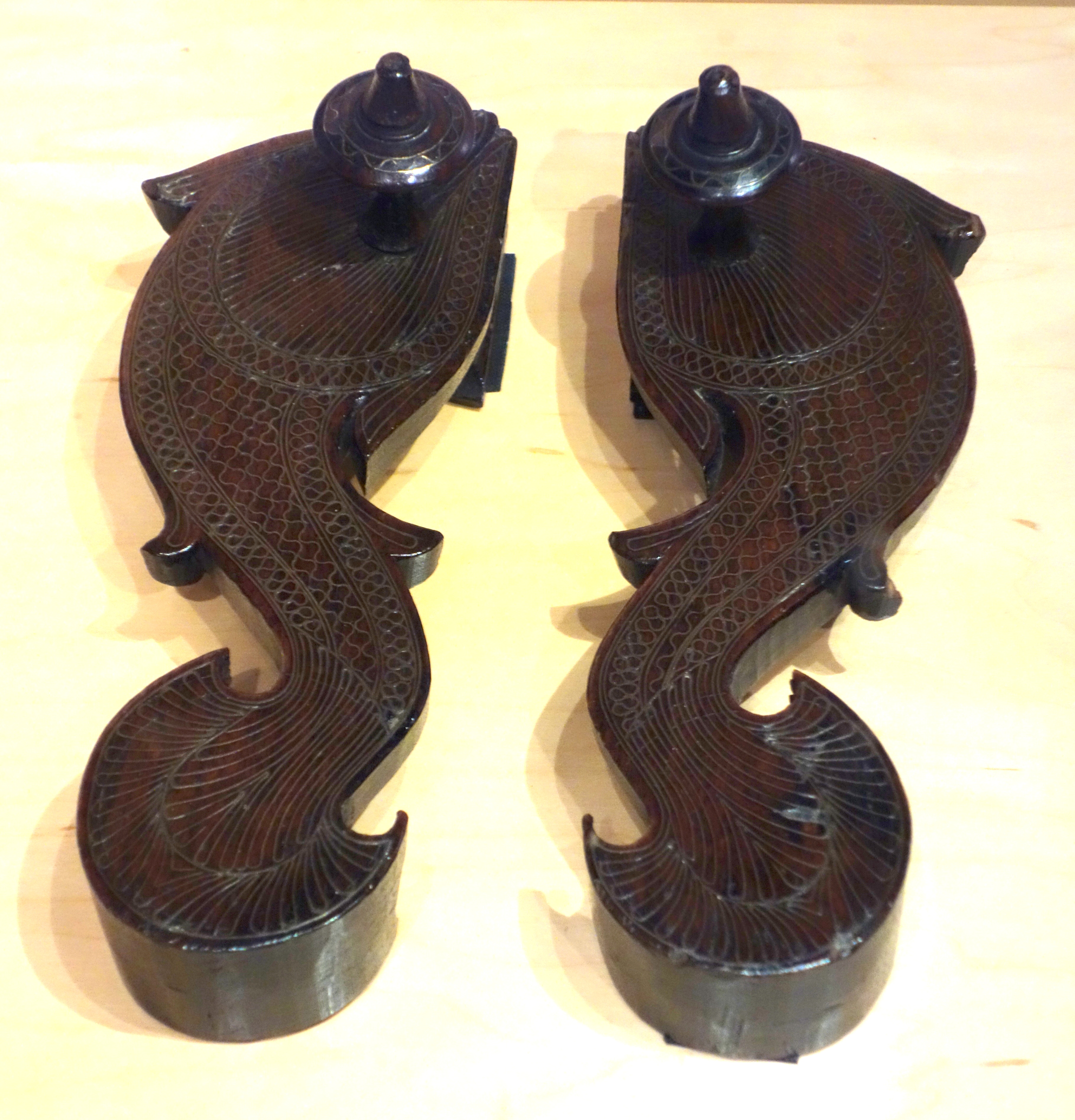
  Paduka
- Pampootie
- Patten
- Peep-toe shoe
- Penny loafer, see Slip-on
- Peranakan beaded slippers
- Peshawari chappal
- Pigache
- Platform shoe
- Plimsoll
- Pointinini
- Poulaine
- Pulhoer
- Racing flat
- Racing shoes
- Riding boots
- Rocker bottom shoe
- Roller shoe
  - Heelys
- Rope-soled shoe
- Russian boot
- Sabot
- Saddle shoe
- Sandal
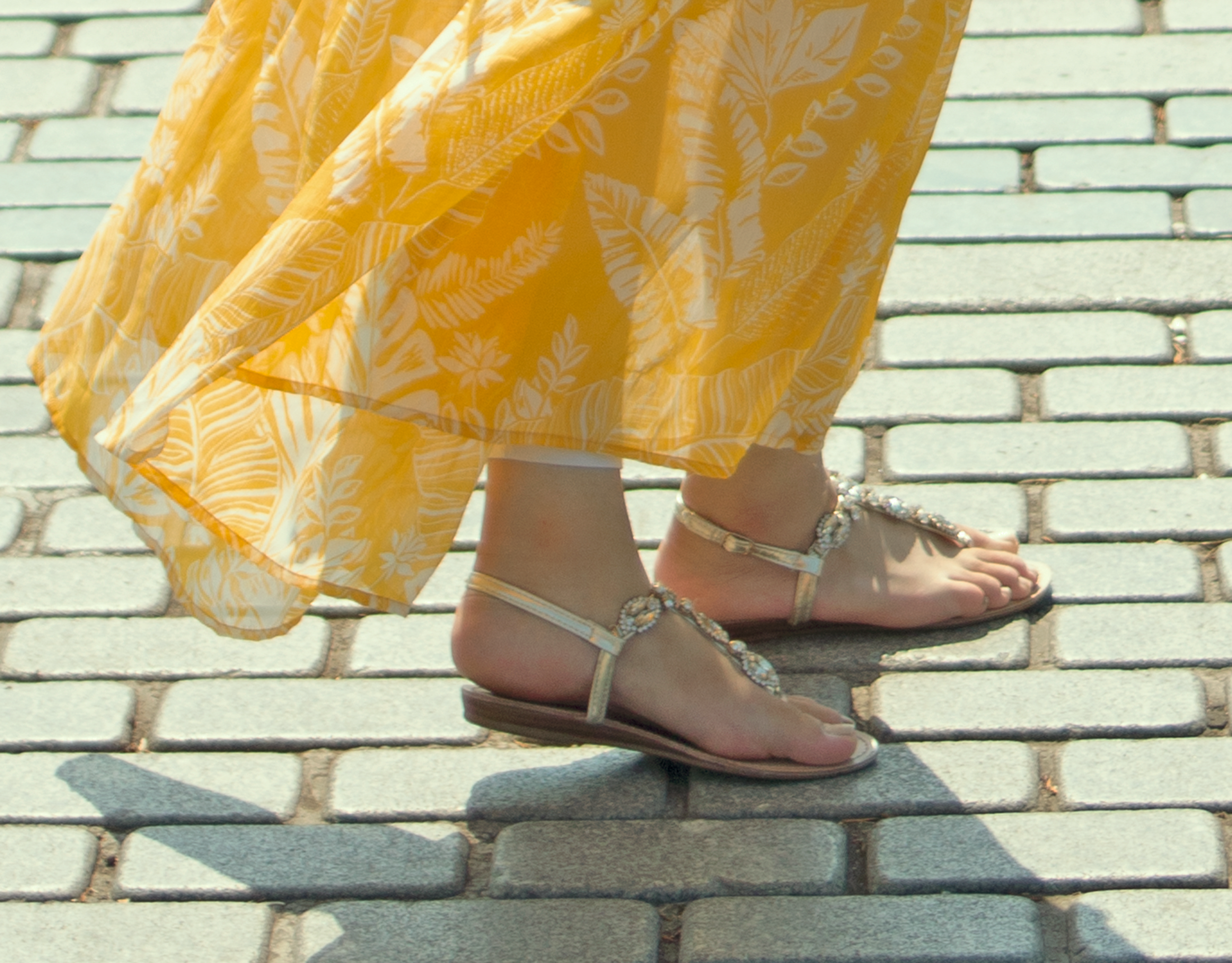
  Sandals held to the feet by both thong and straps.
  - Biblical sandals
  - Coiled sewn
  - Flip-flops
  - Geta
  - Hnyat-phanat
  - Ho Chi Minh
  - Saltwater
  - Zori
- Self-tying shoes
- Skate shoe
- Ski boot
- Slide
- Slingback
- Slip-on, or loafers
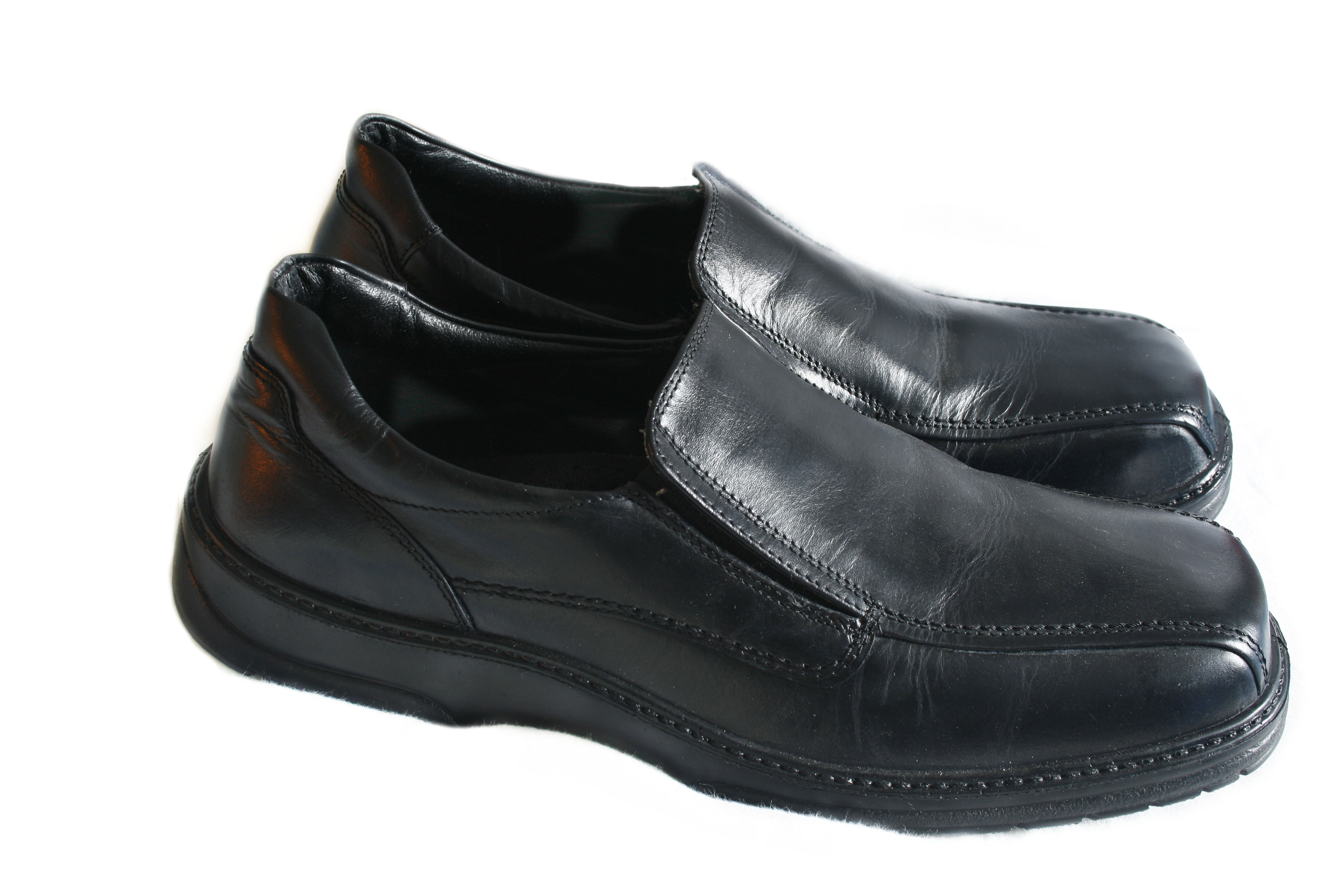
  Blue branded side-gusset slip-on shoes
- Slipper
- Sneakers
  - Trail running shoes
- Snow boot
- Soccus
- Spectator shoe
- Spool heel
- Steel-toe boot
- Tap shoes
- T-bar sandal
- Tiger-head shoes
- Träskor
- Toe shoe
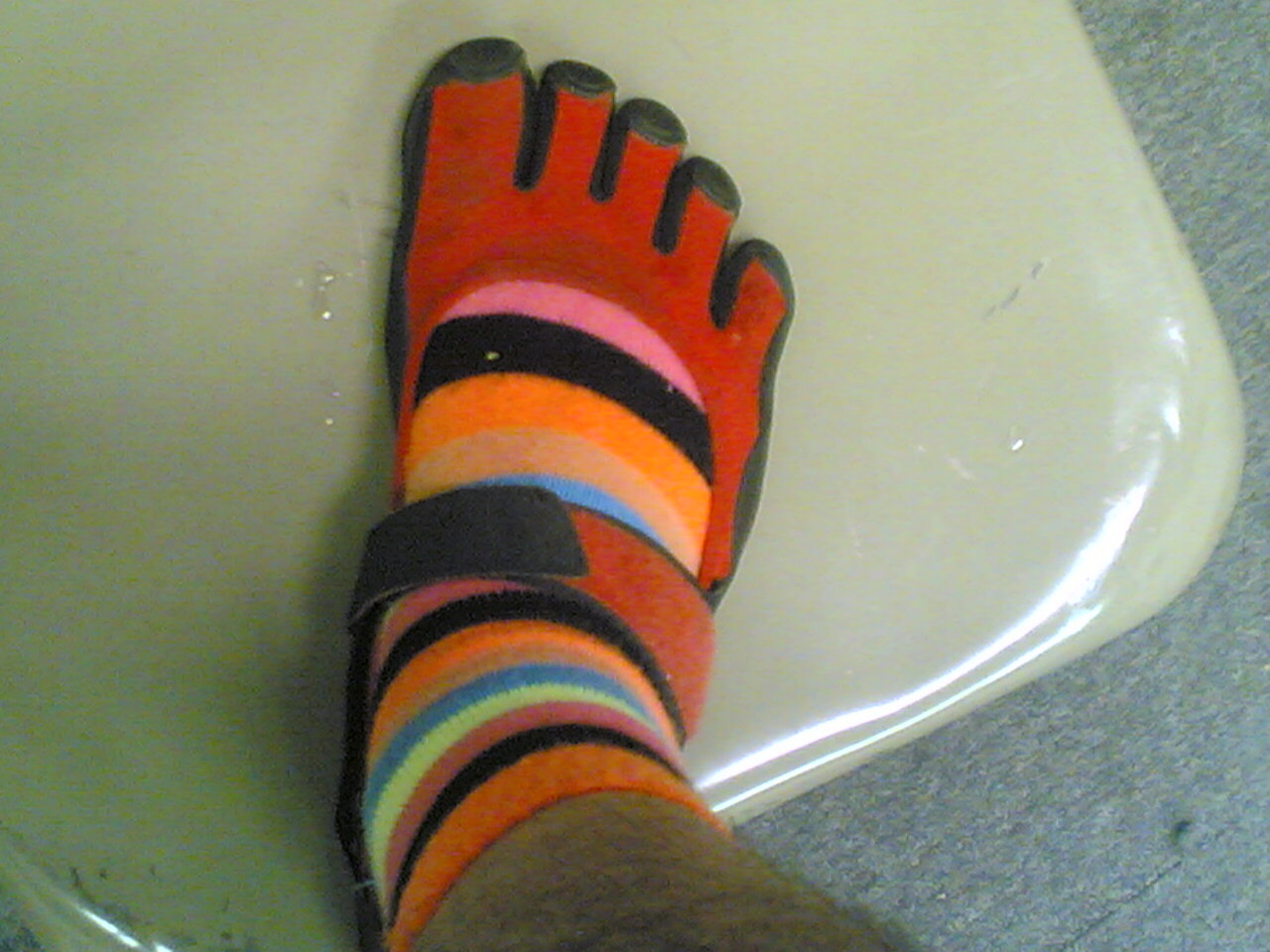
  Toe shoe
- Tsarouchi
- Turnshoe
- Upanah
- Uwabaki
- Valenki
- Veldskoen
- Venetian-style shoe
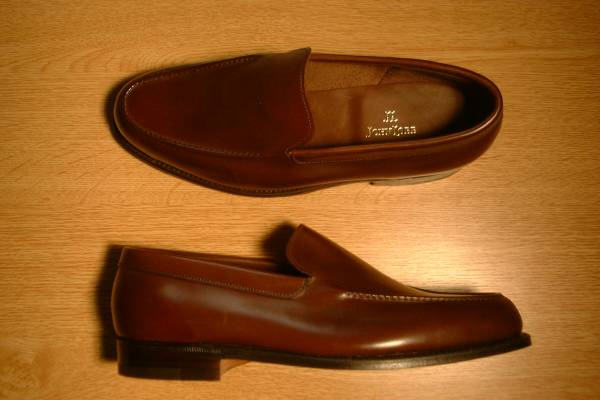
  Venetian loafers
- Waders
- Walk-Over shoes
- Waraji
- Water shoe
- Wedge
- Winklepicker
- Wörishofer
- Wrestling shoe
- Xiuhuaxie

== See also ==
- Calceology
- Cordwainer
- Horseshoe
- List of boots
- List of footwear designers
- Locomotor effects of shoes
- Shoeshiner
- Shoe size
- Shoe store
- Shoe tossing
- Shoes on a table
- Sneaker collecting
