= Saltwater sandals =

American footwear

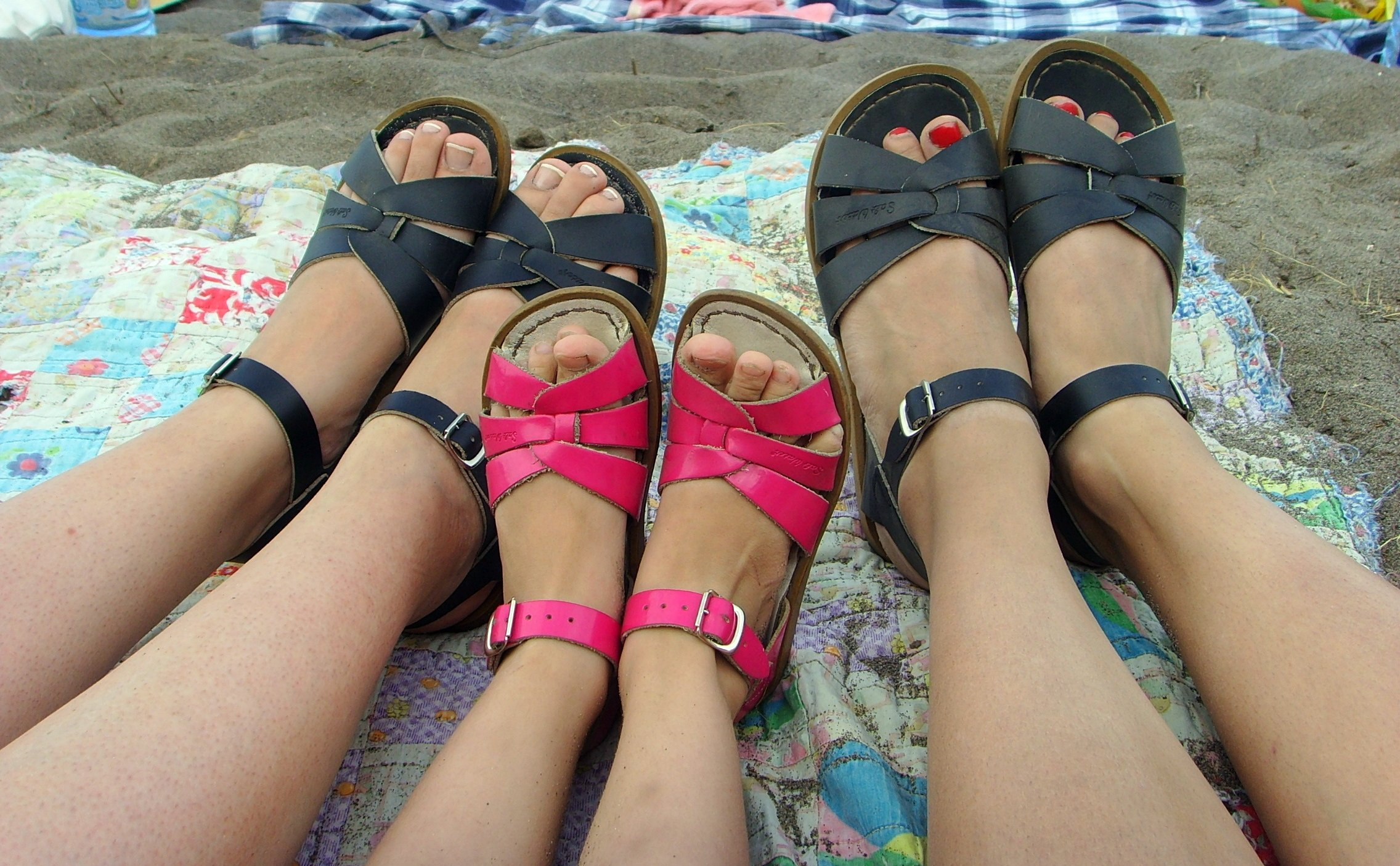
Saltwater sandals being worn

Saltwater sandals are a popular type of footwear sold mainly in western and southern markets of the United States. Saltwater sandals are made of specially treated natural leathers are distinguished by their interlink strap design with an adjustable buckle strap around the ankle.

== History ==
Saltwater sandals originated in the early 1940s as an alternative to traditional children's leather sandals as a way to cope with leather shortages in World War II. The sandals were made primarily from scrap leather left over from making men's shoes.

== Manufacturing ==
The original saltwater sandals were made by the Hoy Shoe Company of St. Louis, MO, the Hoy Shoe Company continues to produce them.

== Trends ==
Saltwater sandals have been a summer staple in the children's footwear category for more than 60 years. More recently, the Hoy Shoe Company introduced Sun-San Salt-Water Sandals for women. In the November 4, 2007 issue of New York Magazine, fashion editor Sarah Bernard compared saltwater sandals to Crocs and UGG boots and identified saltwater sandals as the emerging Ugly Shoe Trend for 2008.

== See also ==
- List of shoe styles
- Ho Chi Minh sandals
