= Spool heel =

Footwear heel shape

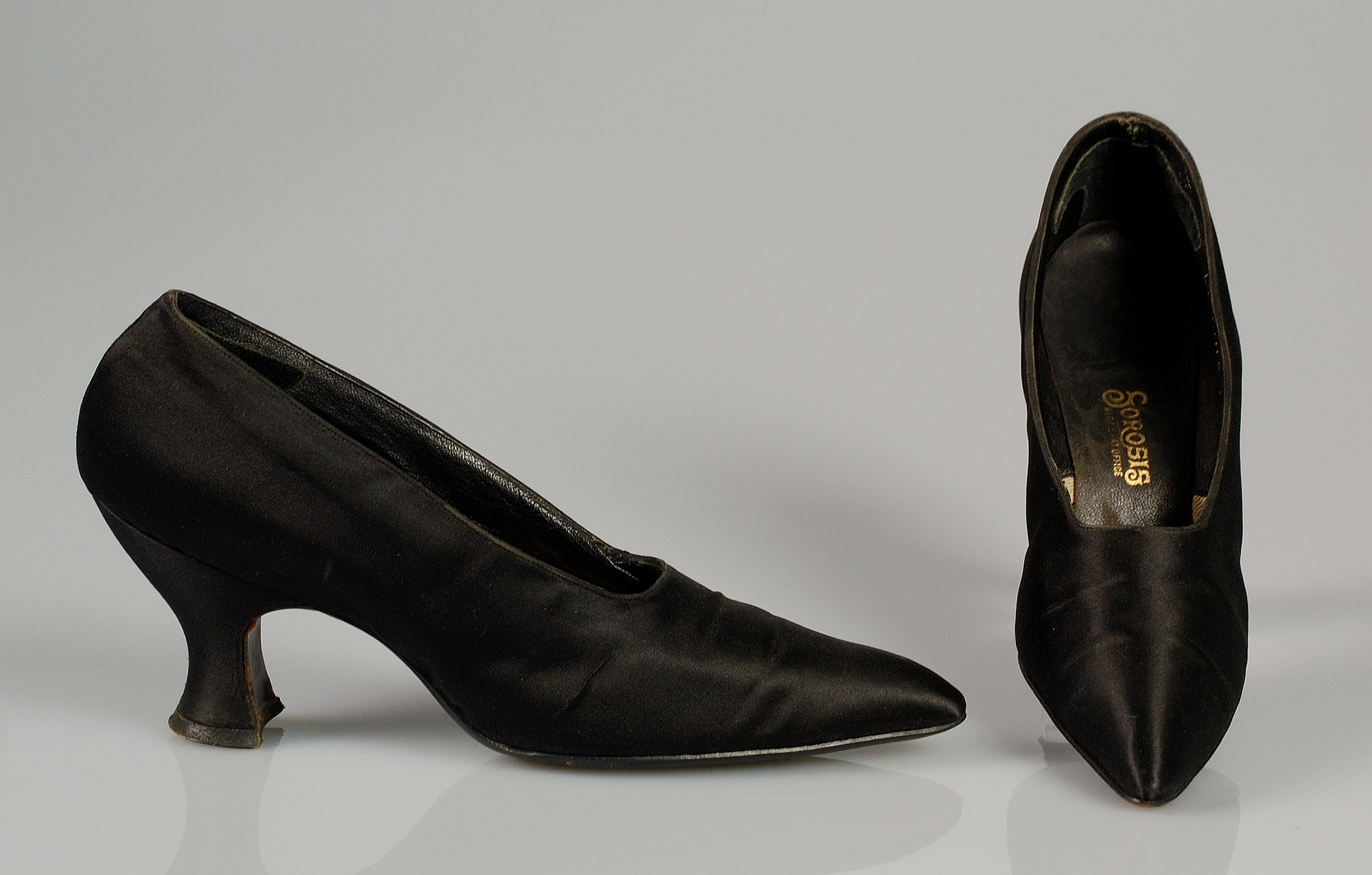
Evening pumps with spool heel (1918), A.E. Little & Co.

A spool heel is a shoe heel that is wide at the top and bottom and narrower in the middle, so resembling a cotton spool or an hourglass. Spool heels were fashionable in Europe during the Baroque and Rococo periods. Its other periods of popularity include the 1860s and the 1950s. This look has been popularized by John Fluevog.

A low spool heel has a small distinctive flare at the heel bottom. Higher spool heels are close to resembling a stiletto heel, but with a flare at the bottom.

Spool heels provide comfort for the wearer and are considered a practical heeled shoe option.

== See also ==
- List of shoe styles
