= Flamenco shoe =

Footwear worn by flamenco dancers

Dancer wearing flamenco shoes with strap and heel

A flamenco shoe is a type of shoe worn by flamenco dancers. They are typically worn by female dancers, they are called flamenco heel, often with traje de flamenca costumes. Male flamenco dancers traditionally wear short, heeled boots, although there are now some flamenco shoe styles available for men.

== Construction ==
Flamenco shoes constructed for dance generally have small nails embedded in the toe and heel to enhance the sound of the dancer's percussive footwork. The most common materials are leather and suede, although synthetic materials are also used in certain grades of shoes. Heel types can include "standard", "carrete" (curved), or "cubano" (short and thick) with a heel size generally ranging from 4 cm to 7 cm. Heels are often covered by the main material but may also be exposed wood. Fastenings may include elastic or leather straps, buckles, or laces.

Many contemporary flamenco shoe manufacturers sell varying quality grades of shoes aimed at dancers from amateur to semi-professional and professional levels. Shoe grades may be named differently by different manufacturers. Professional-level shoes often have extra reinforcement and other enhancements for durability and sound quality.

== Production ==
Historically, flamenco shoes were handcrafted in Spain. Today, there are still many Spanish workshops specializing in the production of flamenco shoes.

== See also ==
- List of shoe styles
