= Furlane (shoe) =

Velvet shoe-slipper

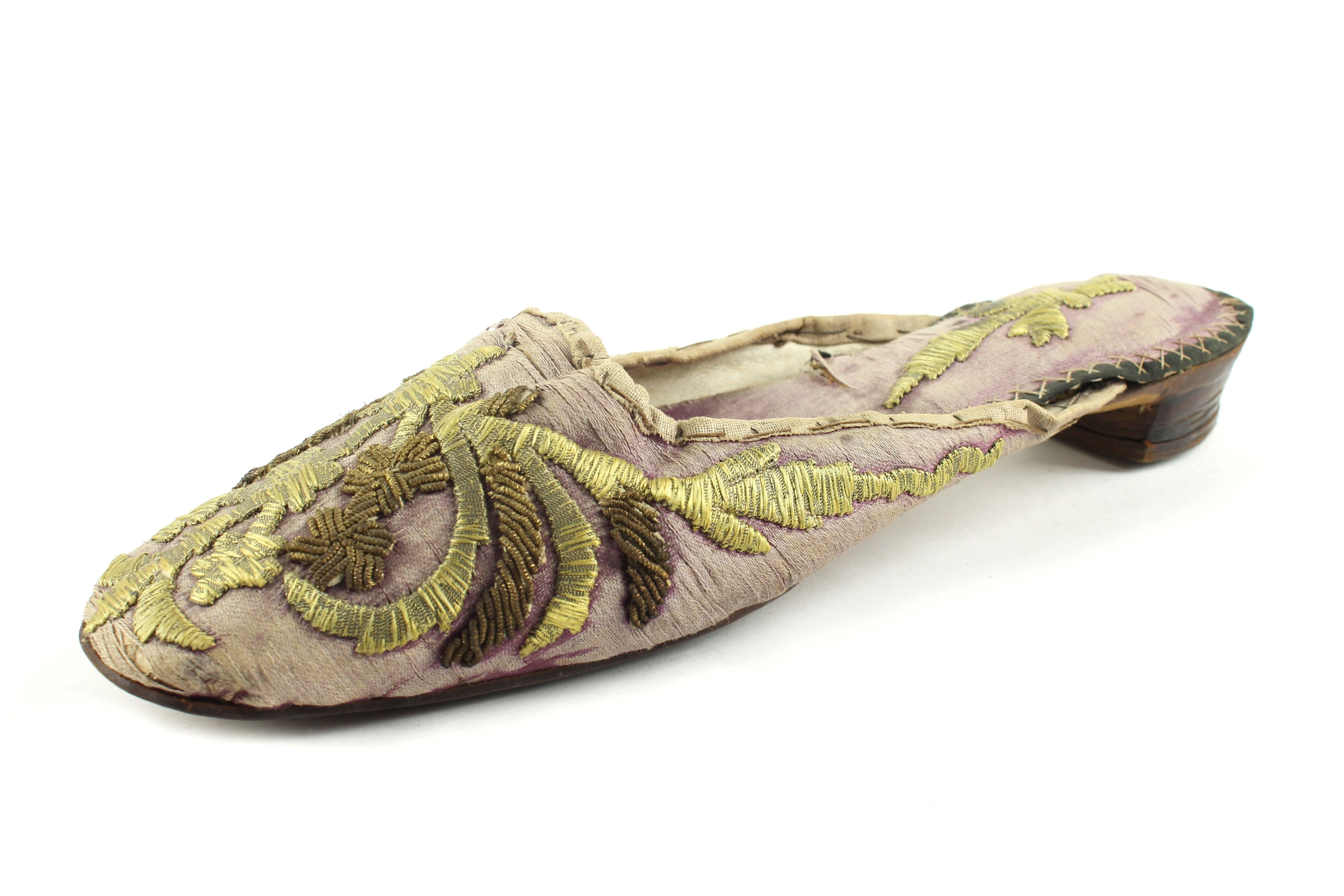
Woman's slipper made in pink silk with golden embroidery. Venice, 19th century.

Furlane or friulane, also known as Gondolier slippers, are Venetian shoe slippers. Usually characterized by their flexible rubber soles, these shoes are usually flats or low heels, with velvet fabric uppers.

== Origin ==
The Furlane shoe originated in the countryside of Friuli in the 19th century and regained popularity in Europe at the end of the Second World War.

Red Cross nurses, who were looking for practical footwear alternatives, started making furlane shoes from the velvet, fabric, and rubber donated by private donors and small businesses. Creating these shoes provided simple, practical work for those who were unemployed, particularly in hospitals such as the Military Hospital, the Morelli di Popolo, and the Regina Margherita.

Later, they began to be sold on the Rialto Bridge, and subsequently were often worn by Venetian gondoliers who used them to protect their feet from the wood of the gondolas.

== Modern furlanes ==
Furlane shoes were seen in high fashion in 2016, especially in the United States. They have often been reshaped into a modified, elongated shape that has a small heel and a slightly peaked toe.

Lily Atherton-Hanbury, founder of Le Monde Béryl, stated that the shoe's history of being made out of recycled materials appealed to modern concerns about sustainability in fashion today.

== Manufacturing ==
Manufacturing furlane shoes is an intricate process, with the upper part being the most complicated to craft. In the post-war era, the shoes were made by the people of Friuli using the cloth of old clothes, sheets, and pieces of tablecloth. Each swatch was bound and cut with a sharp knife to form a comfortable sole. Over time, the cloth sole was replaced with recycled rubber from bicycle tires, which is sometimes still used today.

== See also ==
- List of shoe styles
- Bast shoes, Similar footwear in Balto-Slavic cultures of identical etymological derivation (from fiber used in their manufacture)
- Espadrille, Casual shoe with rope sole
- Waraji, Light tie-on sandals
- Okobo, Traditional Japanese platform clogs
- Zori, Flat Japanese sandals
