= Peep-toe shoe =

Footwear that exposes the wearer's toes

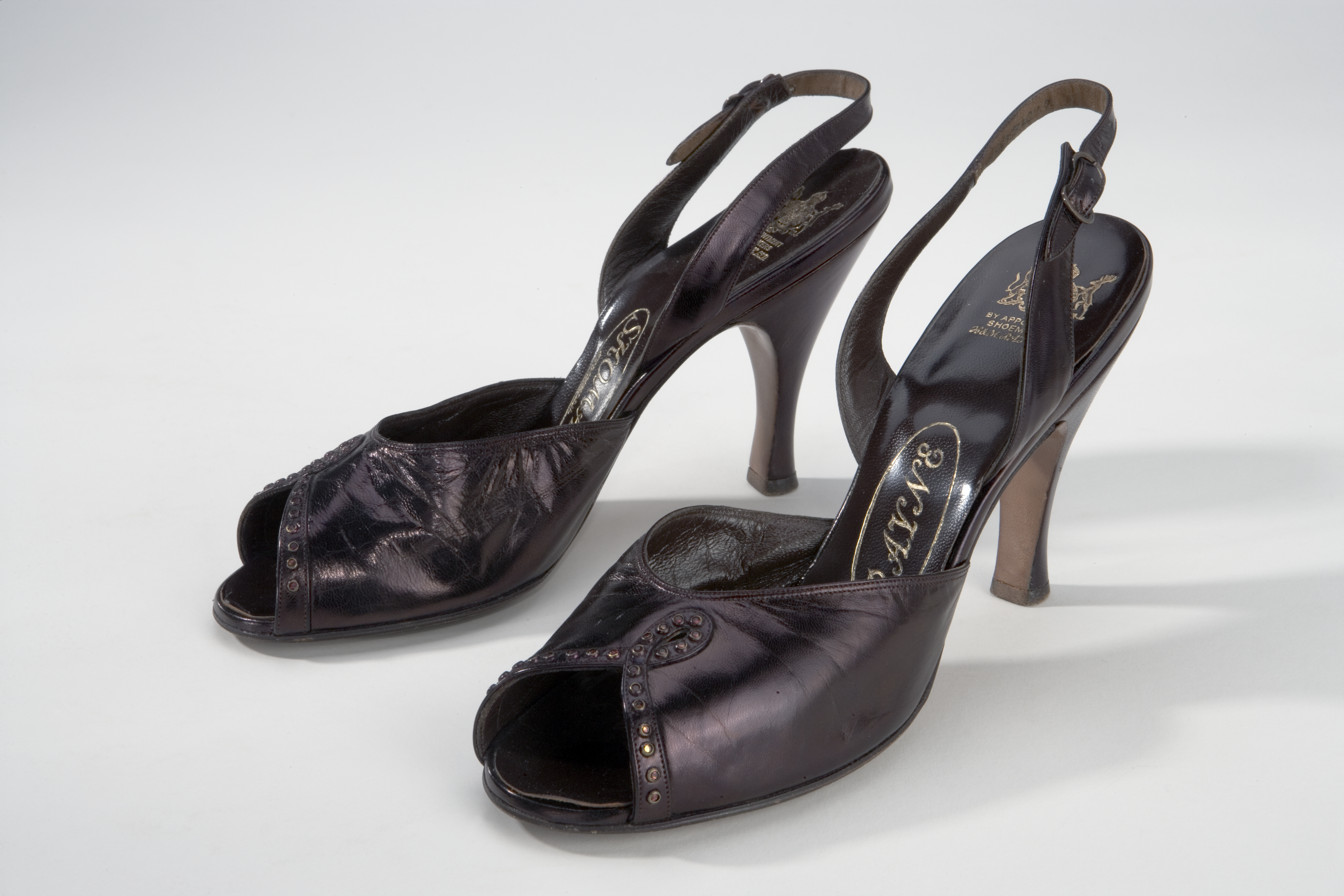
A pair of peep-toe shoes

A peep-toe shoe is a woman's shoe (usually a pump, slingback, bootie, or any other dress shoe) in which there is an opening at the toe box which allows the toes to show.

Peep-toe shoes were popular beginning in the 1940s but disappeared by the 1960s. Peep-toe shoes had a brief resurgence in the 1970s/80s, before falling out of fashion by the mid-1990s. More recently, they have become popular again, with variations such as "peep-toe boots" appearing.

Not to be confused with "tow shoes", invented by Scott J. Wiener, which are used to rig and tow small vehicles and floor-bound items.

== See also ==
- List of shoe styles
