= Wedge (footwear) =

Type of shoe or boot

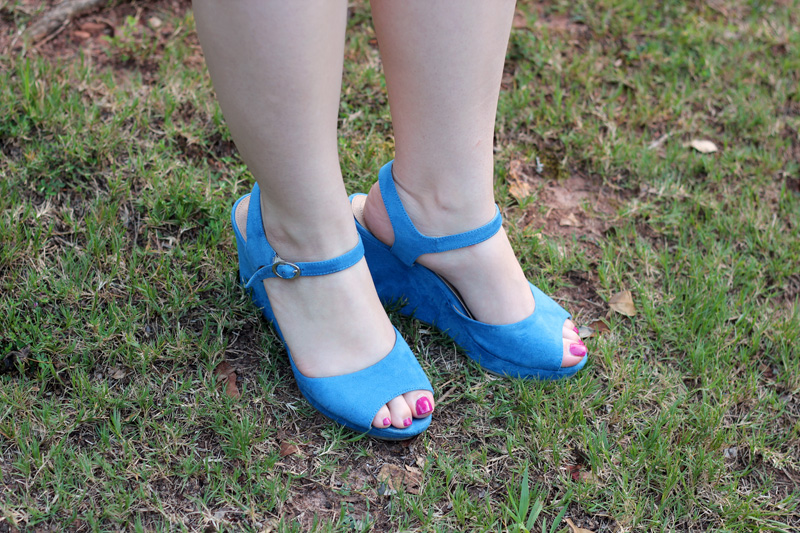
Light blue peeptoe wedge heels

Wedge boots, wedgies, or lifties are shoes and boots with a sole in the form of a wedge, such that one piece of material, normally rubber, serves as both the sole and the heel.

This design dates back to ancient Greece. Greek Actors used to wear these shoes to signify status. These were crucial so the audience can be able to identify who is of importance in stage plays. According to the Kennedy Center, "tragic actors would don shoes called 'buskins', or raised platform shoes, to symbolize their superiority over comic actors, who would wear plain socks."

== Women ==
Wedges for women are more common and often have a sole that is much thicker at the back than at the front, making them high-heeled boots or shoes. Wedgies for women were popularized by Salvatore Ferragamo, who introduced the design to the Italian market in the late 1930s. The evolution of wedge heels became more and more colorful and outrageous through the 1970s-1990s.

== Men ==
Men's wedge boots, usually called "wedgies", typically have low heels. Men's boots of this kind became popular during the 1970s.

Some forms of wedge boots, called platform boots, have thick soles throughout.

There are many styles available under the wedges footwear category; the most common styles are low wedge, t-straps wedge, ankle straps wedge, platform wedge, and closed-toe wedge.

== High fashion ==
In the high fashion world, Ferragamo invented the cork wedge shoe in the 1940s due to the economic sanctions against Italy. Ferragamo could no longer afford to purchase steel for traditional heels. He experimented with pieces of Sardinian cork. It was glued and trimmed until the entire space between the sole and heel was solid.

== See also ==
- List of boots
- List of shoe styles

== Bibliography ==
- Bergstein, Rachelle (2012). Women From the Ankle Down - The Story of Shoes and How They Define Us (Hardback). New York: Harper Collins. pp. 284 pages. ISBN 978-0-06-196961-4.
