= Racing shoes =

Shoes for auto racing and driving

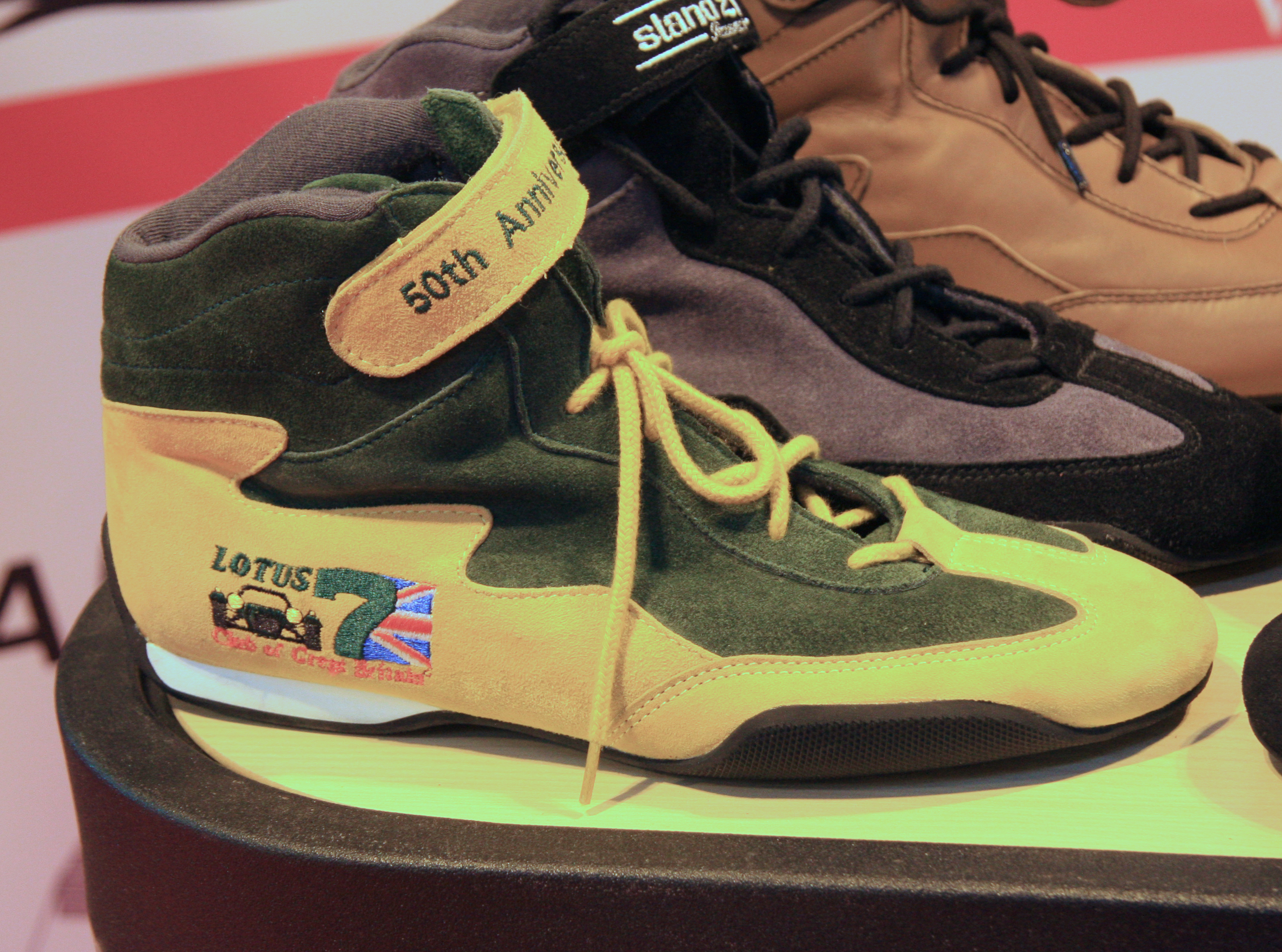
Racing shoes on display. The shoe on the foreground commemorates the 50th anniversary of the Lotus 7 sports car.

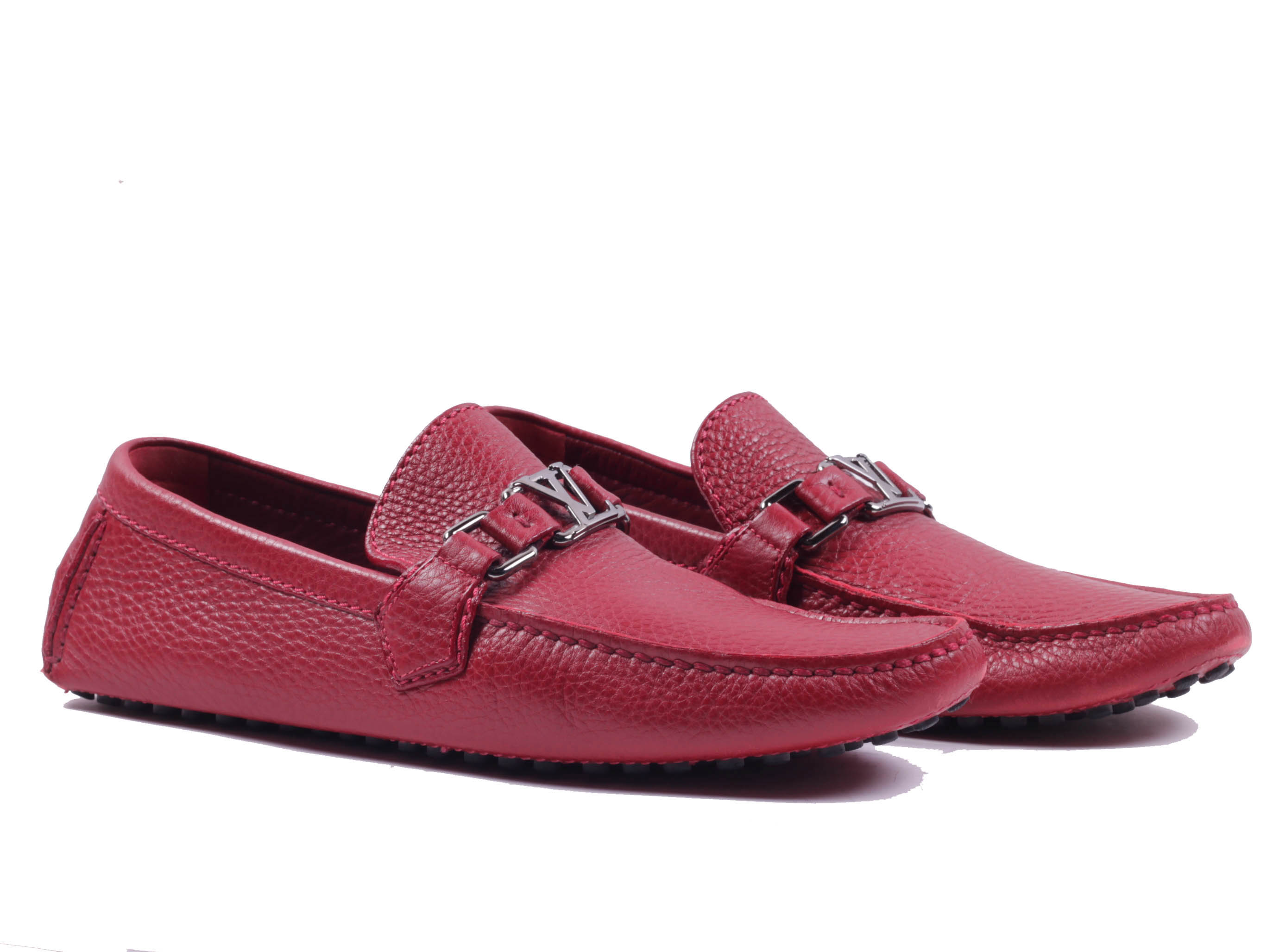
Casual Louis Vuitton driving loafers.

Racing shoes, motorsport shoes or driving shoes are the footwear used for the practice of motorsport or day-to-day driving. They are generally built to provide comfort and precision for operating pedals for an extended period of time, with a narrow, close-fitting construction and thin, flexible soles, as well as to provide protection from fire along with a racing suit, in the context of motorsport. The standards for shoes worn in auto racing, as with other equipment, are regulated by the FIA.

The invention of racing shoes is commonly attributed to Italian shoemaker Francesco "Ciccio" Liberto, in the late 1960s, though another Italian shoemaker, Gianni Mostile, had patented a model of driving moccasins as early as 1963. Prior to that, professional racecar drivers worn ordinary casual shoes for racing, sometimes wrapped in adhesive tape to provide better traction and stability. Racing shoes were popularized among motorsport fans and the general public after the release of the Speed Cat and its successor Future Cat, developed by Sparco and Puma, and their use by use by German Formula One champion Michael Schumacher during the early 2000s.

It is popular among Formula One drivers, especially Australian ones, to drink from their racing shoes to celebrate victories, a practice referred to as a "shoey."

== See also ==
- List of shoe styles
