= Safari boot =

Type of footwear

Safari boots are shoes made out of leather or canvas in brown or tan colors that are specifically made for use during safari in arid environments. They typically have high uppers to provide ankle support, much like combat boots.

Safari boots have multiple types which have distinct features for use on different altitudes and terrains. Boots optimized for mountainous or rock-like terrains often have hard, stiff soles with deep lugs for traction, while boots for flat or rolling deserts tend to be lighter in weight, uninsulated and have ventilation holes on the sides.

Safari boots were in fashion during the late 1980s and early 1990s. Camel Trophy released the range of 'Adventure Boots' as well as various brands such as Travel Fox who made the 'world tour boot' with a side pocket.

== See also ==
- List of shoe styles
- Safari jacket
