= Pointinini =

Shoe popular in Côte d'Ivoire

The pointinini (pointed shoe) is a type of shoe popular in Côte d'Ivoire.

== Description ==
They are shoes whose characteristic is that the front part pointed and is slightly bent, available in all the colors and various materials (leather, deer, synthetic fibre).

== Tendency ==
This fashion strongly developed in Côte d'Ivoire and was quickly exported with Coupé-Décalé and the concept of the "farot" incarnated by JetSet. Ivorian singer Abou Nidal sings about it in "La chaussure qui parle" (The shoe which speaks).

The pointinini is a key component of the "Afrodesign" or modern "Afrostyle". The pointinini is a true phenomenon of style in Africa. The pointinini was not invented by Abou Nidal but finds its origins in the centre of Africa in the Democratic Republic of Congo, via the science of sapeology (which originates from the word sape i.e. Societe Admirer des Persons Elegant).

== See also ==
- List of shoe styles
