= Turkish clogs =

Types of clog originating in Turkey

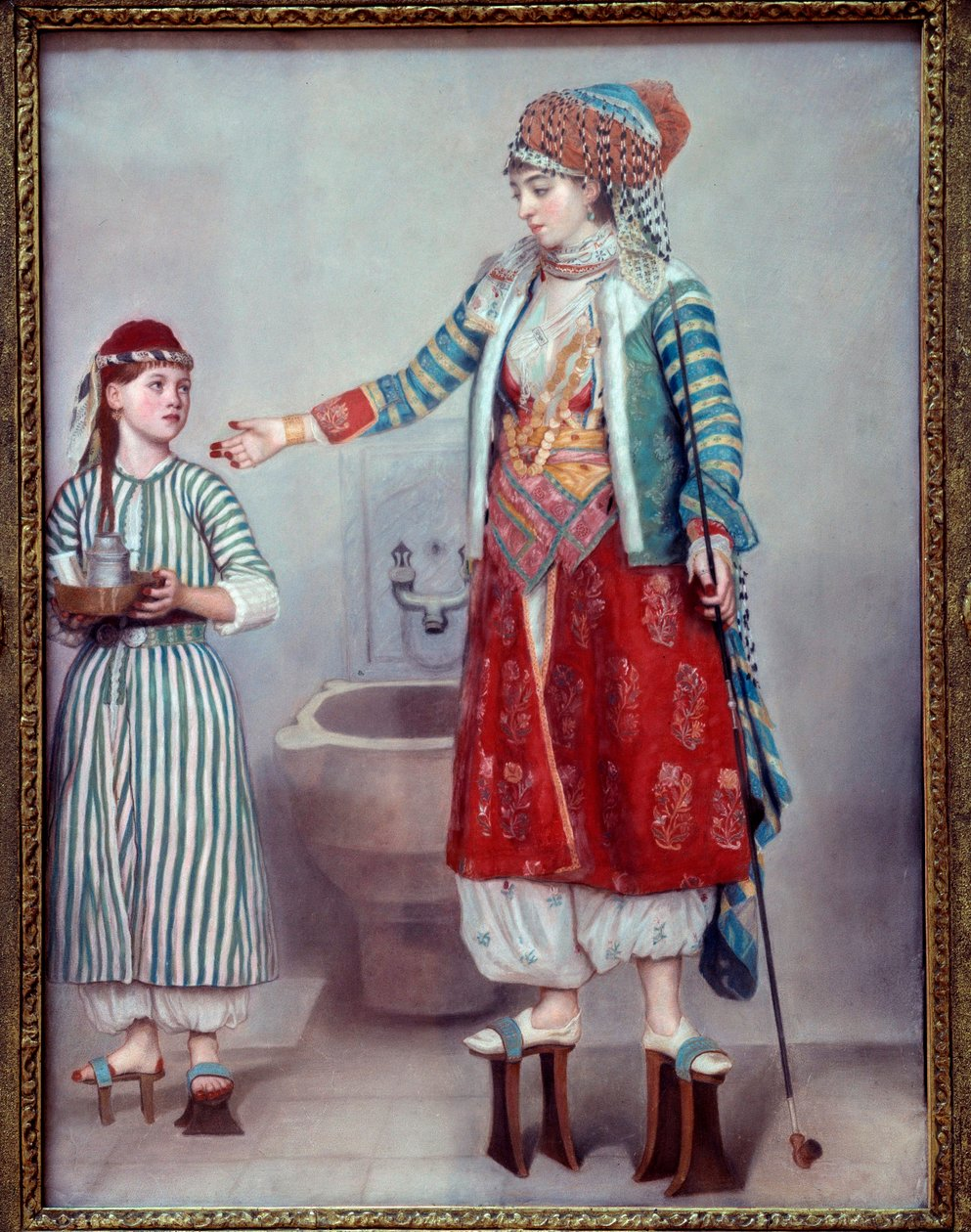
Jean-Etienne Liotard (1702-1789): Turkish lady with her slave at the hamam.

Clogs have traditionally been used in hammams to protect the foot from dirty water and soap. The earlier form were called "nalins" and originated during the Ottoman period. Nalins came to be artistic objects which indicated the wearer's social standing. As domestic baths became more common the rituals of the bath house declined and nalins were replaced with the simpler "takunya". Takunya are also worn outside of the bath house. Since 1960 takunya have in their turn been replaced by plastic slippers which are lighter and quieter.

== Nalin ==
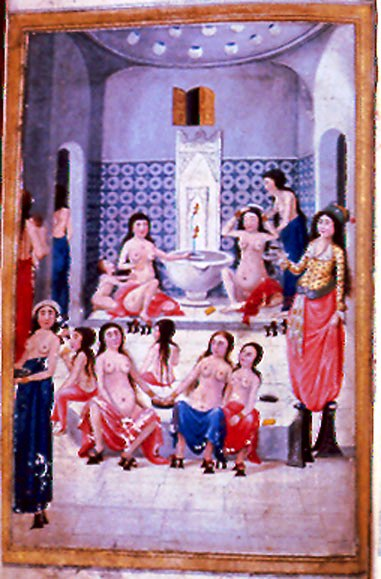
Women's bath, illustration from Husein Fâzıl-i Enderuni's Zanan-Name, 18th century

A nalin was based on a wooden sole supported on wooden plates under the heel and ball of the foot and carved from a single piece. A strap secured the nalin to the foot. The base was carved from a hardwood such as plane, box, ebony, walnut or sandalwood. The base was then embellished with precious metals or inlaid with mother-of-pearl or tortoise shell. The strap was of leather or fabric with jewels and embroidery.

In 1898 a price of five guineas (£5.5s or £5.25 equivalent to £590 in 2025 (Note: UK Consumer Price Index inflation figures from 1209–2024 based on data from "Inflation calculator". Bank of England. London. 18 February 2026.)) was quoted in Notes and Queries for a pair of Nalins. The description of them was (in metric units the quoted dimensions are 23 cm long and 7.9 cm high):

Of wood, covered with red leather, red leather straps, all overlaid with pierced, chased and engraved silver in floral arabesques of Armenian workmanship; length of foot board 9 1/8 in., heels 3 1/8in. high.

The height of the plates and the quality of the embellishments was determined by the status of the wearer. The height varied from 5 centimetres (2.0 in) to 30 centimetres (12 in). Enderûnlu Fâzıl's 18th century painting of a bathhouse shows one finely dressed woman with very high nalins whilst the majority of subjects have much lower footwear. Nalin were often part of a woman's dowry. Babies were sometimes given miniature versions as gifts.

Although mostly associated with hammams or bath houses, they were also worn in stone houses, konaks and palaces.

Turkish nalins are claimed to have influenced Venetian chopines which were similarly tall clogs.

== Takunya ==
Takunya have a lower sole with no plates, the heel is raised on a solid block giving a clear instep. Generally they are made from Oriental Hornbeam. Like the nalin a strap passes over the foot to secure it. The soles have a profile similar to a Träskor or an English clog, but with a simple fabric strap over the front of the foot. They are produced by machine and then the treads from used tyres are nailed to the bottom of the sole.

== Gallery ==
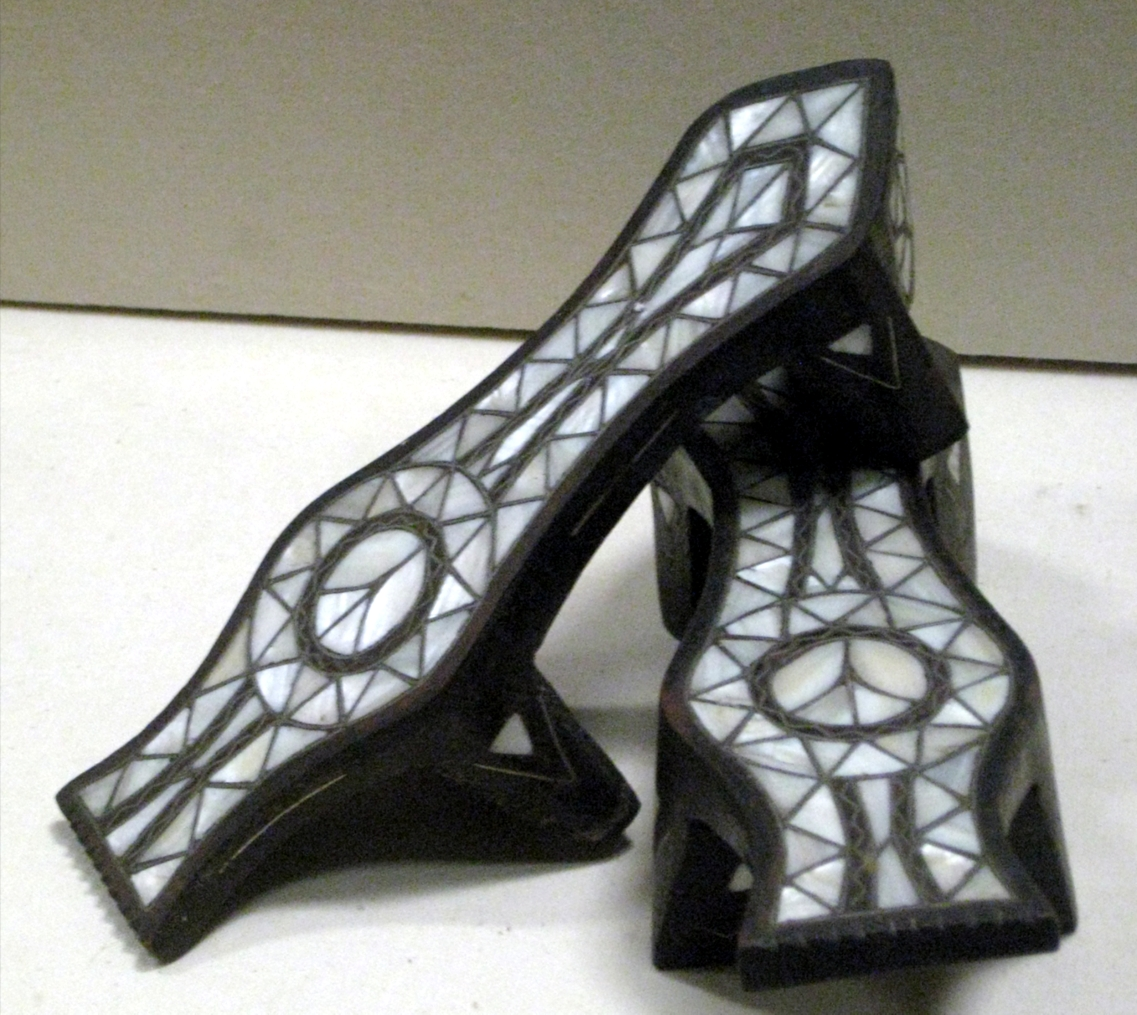
Mother-of-pearl inlaid nalin

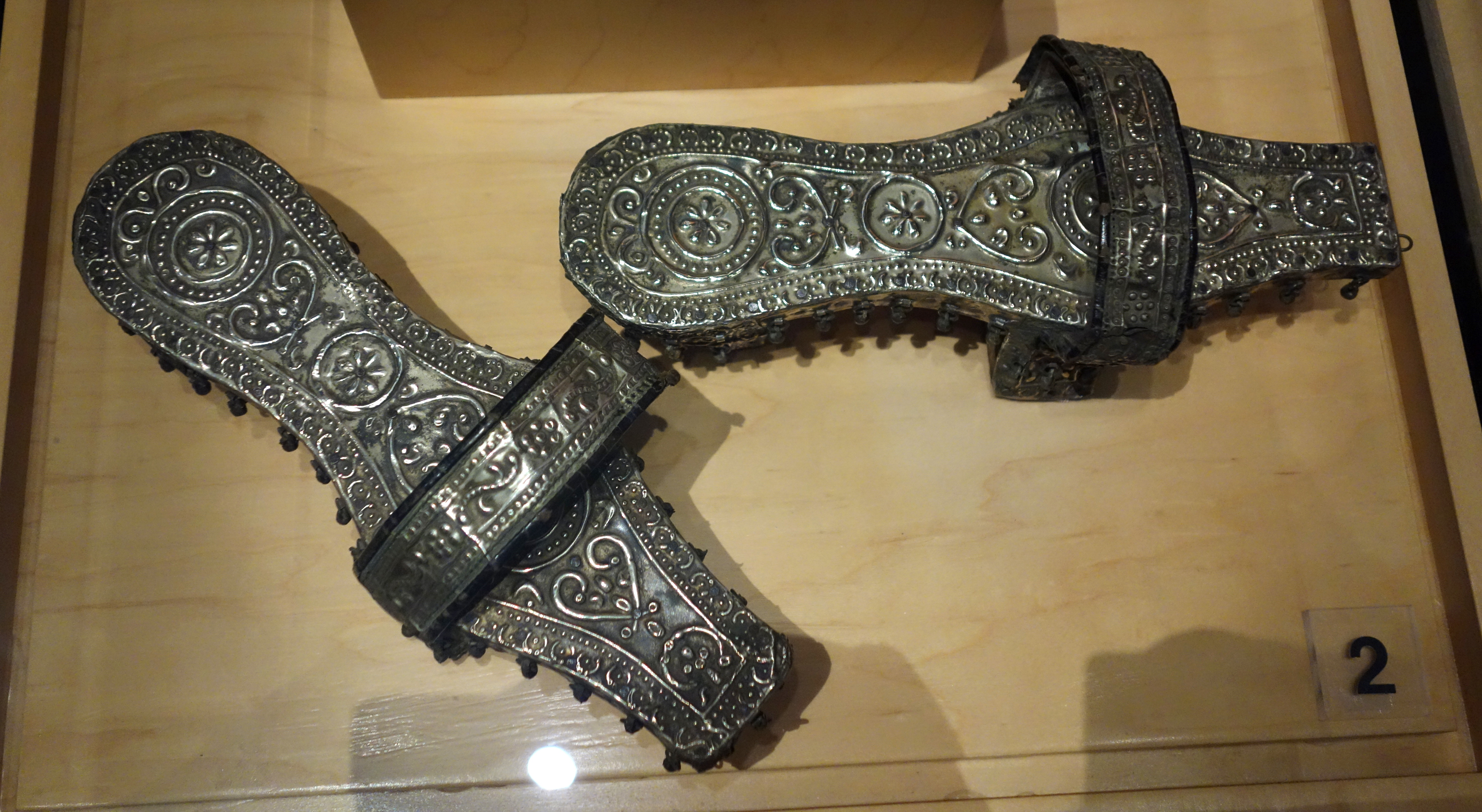
Silver covered nalin on display at the Bata Shoe Museum, Canada

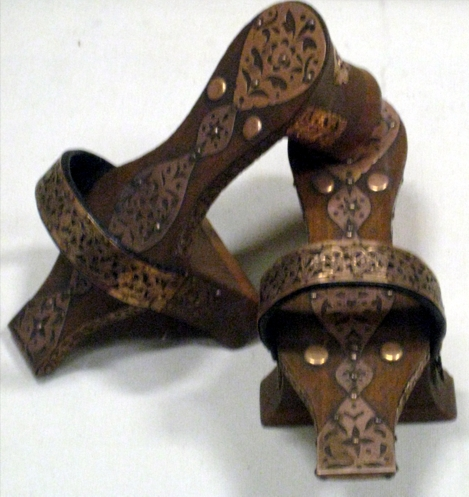
Lower status nalin in copper showing the rounded heel displayed in the Turkish and Islamic Arts Museum, Istanbul

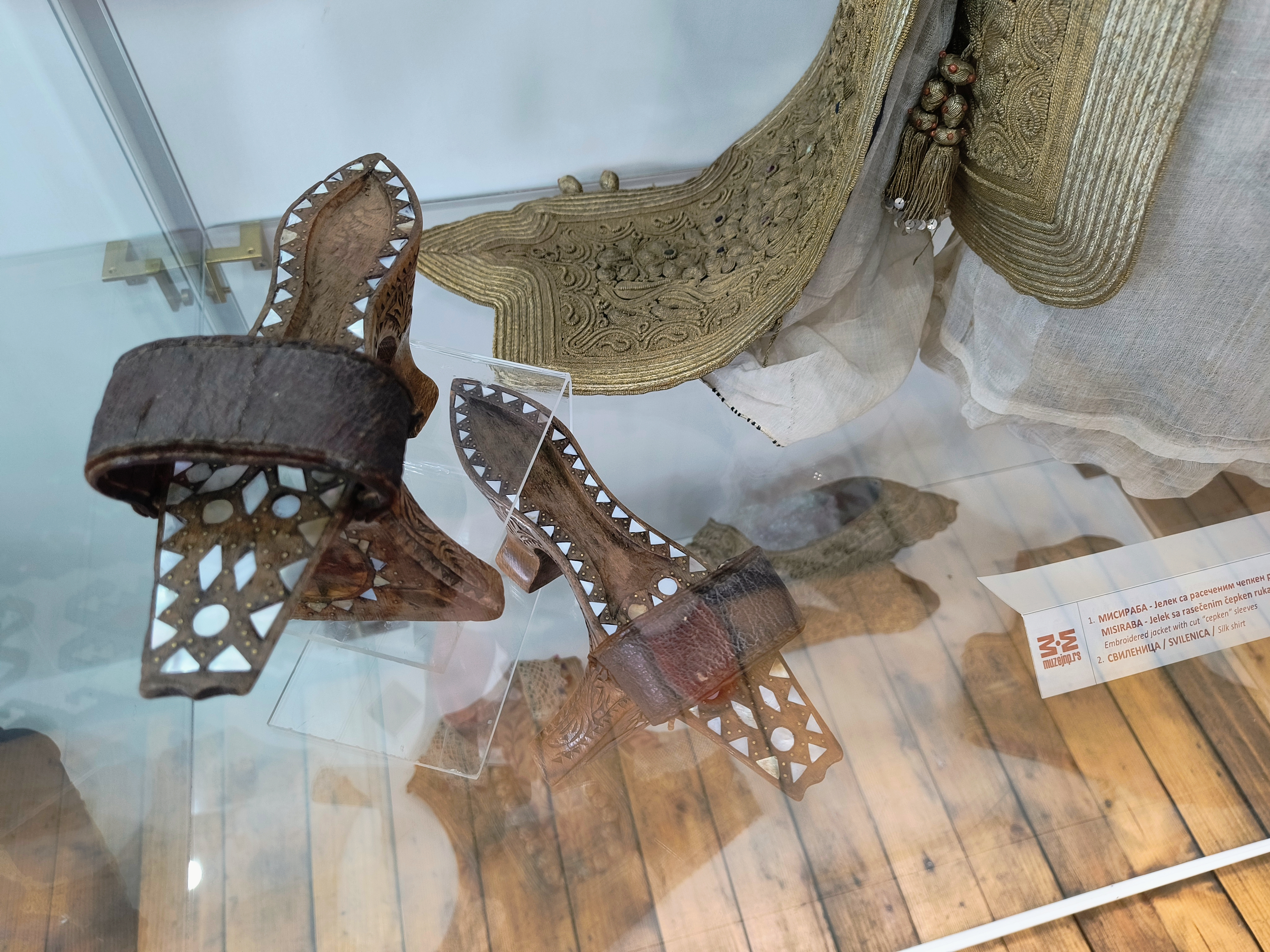
Nalin from Novi Pazar (Ras Museum, Novi Pazar, Serbia)

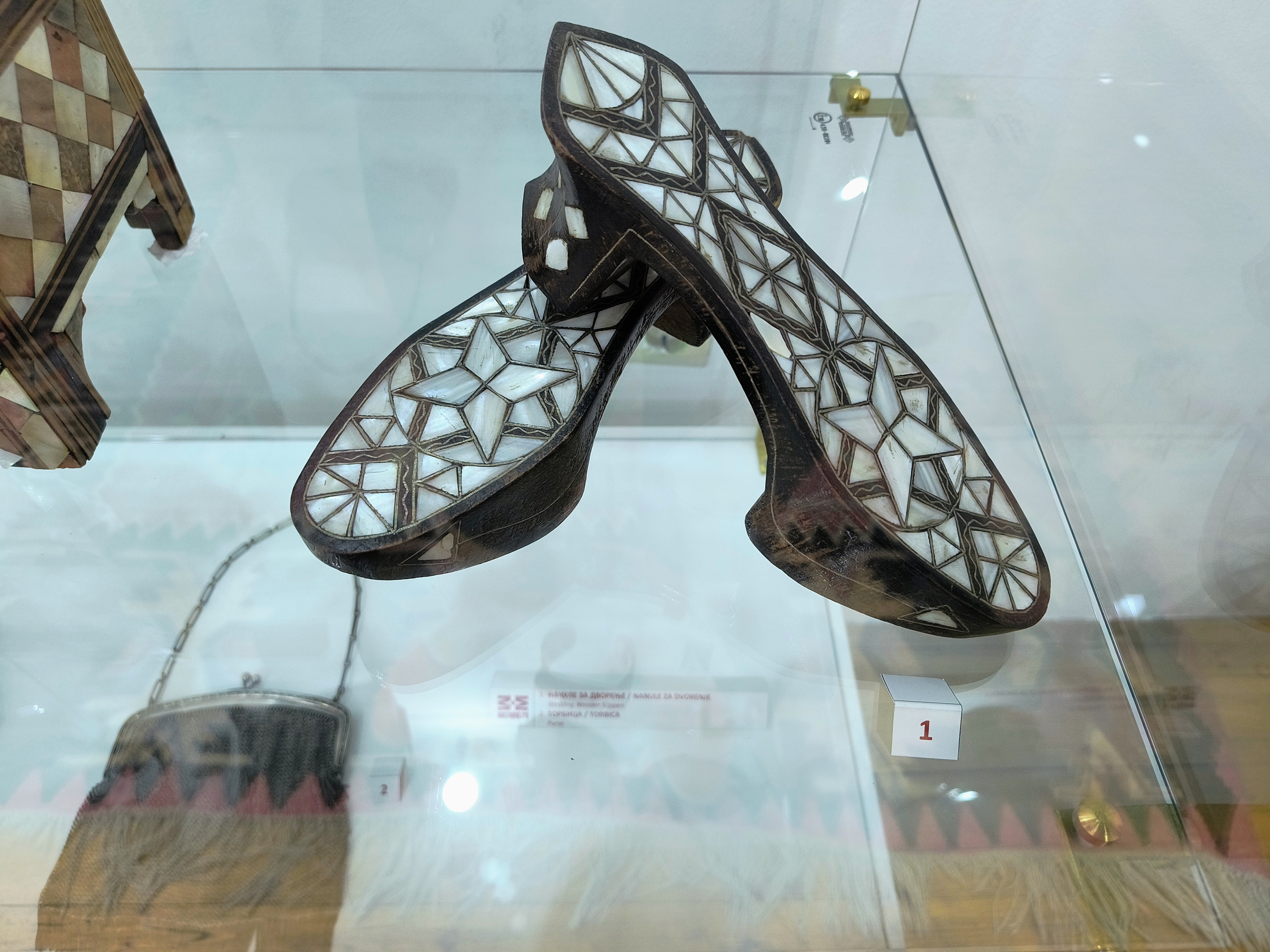
Nalin for serving (Ras Museum, Novi Pazar, Serbia)

== See also ==
- List of shoe styles

== Citations ==
- Demirci, Süheyla; Toker, Ayşe; Kulaçoğlu, Belma (2005), Sivas Ataturk Congress & Ethnography Museum, vol. 2221 of Yapı Kredi Yayınları, YKY, ISBN 9789750809736
- Dörtbaş, Mine Ovacık (2020), "The Bathing Clogs", Turkish Cultural Foundation
- Ergil, Leyla Yvonne (11 August 2017), "Magic slippers: Tales of the Turkish 'terlik'", The Daily Sabah
- Notes and Queries, Oxford University Press, 1898
- The Guide (21 June 2019), How to hammam: first timer's guide to Turkish bath
