= Slingback =

Style of women's footwear

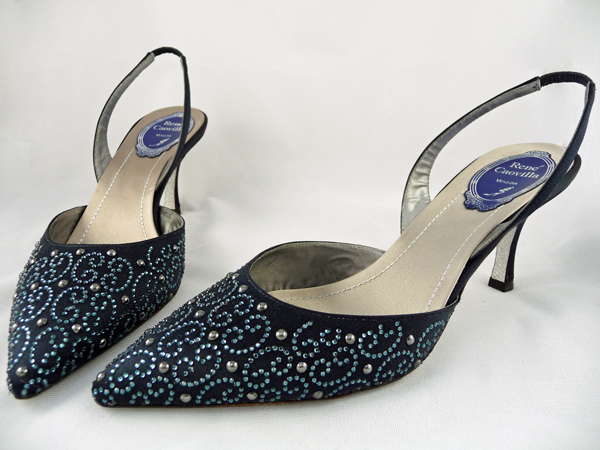
Slingbacks

A slingback is a type of woman's footwear characterized by an ankle strap that crosses only around the back and sides of the ankle and heel, whereas a typical strap completely encircles the ankle all the way around it.

== History ==
Slingback shoes emerged in the early 20th century as designers began experimenting with lighter, more open footwear styles. According to Women's Wear Daily, the style originated in the 1930s, when exposing a significant portion of the foot and heel was still considered improper; as a result, slingbacks were typically worn with full-length evening gowns that concealed the exposed heel. The style appeared alongside a broader 1930s trend toward "strappy" sandals that revealed more of the foot than earlier shoe designs had allowed.

By the 1940s, the slingback became closely associated with pin-up imagery, paired with exposed ankles, pointed toes, and short skirts in a style popularized on posters and in advertising.

Coco Chanel drew on her own 1920s design sensibility and the popular cap-toe shoes of the period when she introduced her now-iconic two-tone slingback pump in 1957, cementing the style's association with the "Chanel look." The design was reissued by Karl Lagerfeld in 2015.

It typically has a low vamp front similar to that of classic full shoe heels.

Slingbacks can be considered a type of sandal and come in a wide variety of styles from casual to dressy, with heel heights ranging from flat to medium and sometimes high, heel types ranging from as thin as a stiletto to as thick as wedges and they can be both closed or open-toe.

Slingback straps are usually adjustable through a buckle or an elastic segment, allowing the wearer to slip their foot into the sandal easily without the need to make further (or any) manual adjustment to the strap or buckle, while still holding the foot in the sandal relatively securely. The buckle can be made of metal, plastic, or even sometimes stone.

Classic designs include Chanel's two-tone slingback, introduced in 1957 and relaunched in 2015 by designer Karl Lagerfeld.

== See also ==
- List of shoe styles
