= Coiled sewn sandals =

Ancient Egyptian footwear

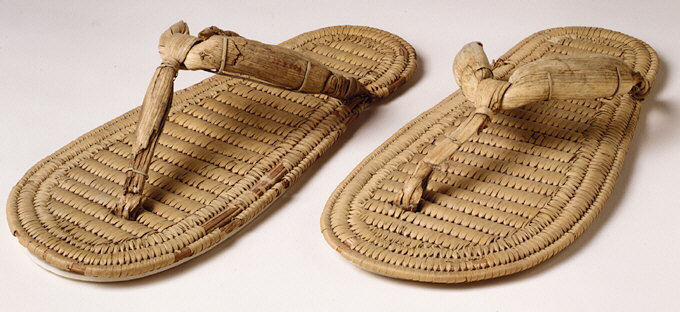
Pair of sandals, ca. 1580–1479 BC; Metropolitan Museum of Art

Coiled sewn sandals are an ancient Egyptian footwear constructed using a technique similar to that used in basket weaving with a technique whereby coils were sewn together with the same material used in construction of the coils. The shoes were typically woven using halfa grass.

== See also ==
- List of shoe styles
- Waraji
