= Clear heels =

High-heeled shoes made from transparent materials

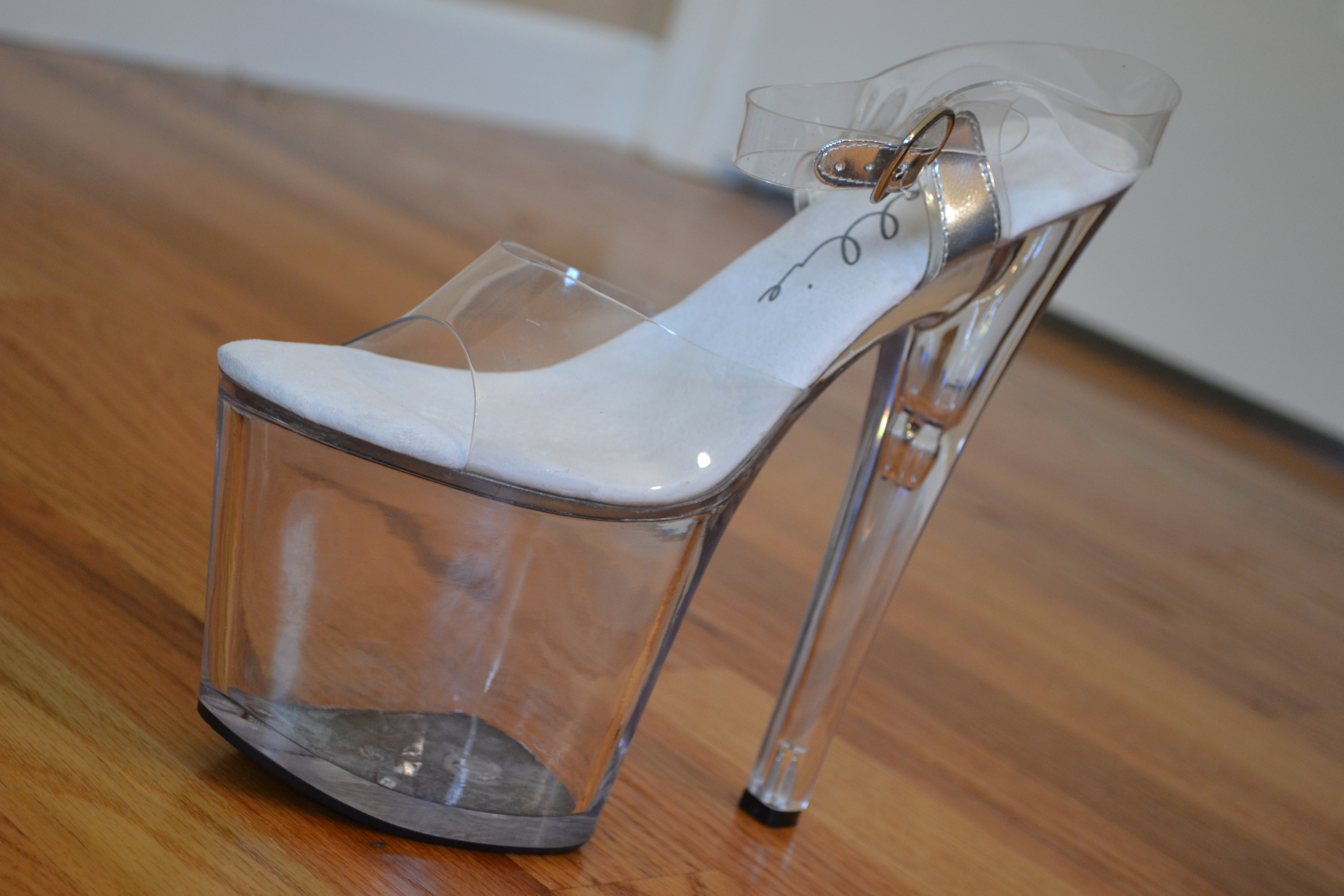
An example of an Ellie-821, an 8-inch clear high-heel.

Clear heels (also referred to as stripper shoes) are high-heeled footwear made from a transparent material.

Heels sometimes contain novelties such as flashing lights, coloured liquid, or even live animals such as fish. Materials used to create the heel design include polycarbonate, PVC, lucite, and acrylic resin. The transparency may be used deceptively with a ballerina style to give the appearance of standing on tiptoe or en pointe.

A more romantic style resembling Cinderella's glass slipper has been designed for social events such as the prom, but generally designs are more provocative with very high heels.

Popular brands include Pleaser and Luscious. In 2009, New York Magazine indicated that the style was "on trend" for the Spring 2010 shows, notably in Milan at Dsquared2, Prada, and Fendi. The association between clear heels and erotic performers and pornography has led to criticism of celebrities for wearing the trend in public. In an interview, actress and singer Taylor Momsen noted that she liked performing in a pair that had a slot for tips, "fans started putting money in them, so now they are filled with tons of bills".

== Notable wearers ==
- Carmen Miranda
- Beyoncé
- John Fuqua
- Taylor Momsen
- Helen Mirren
- Disco Stu
- Courtney Stodden
- Kim Kardashian
- Marina Diamandis
- Kate Beckinsale
- Katy Perry
- Kathryn Newton
- Doja Cat

== See also ==
- List of shoe styles
