= Water shoe =

Type of outdoor footwear

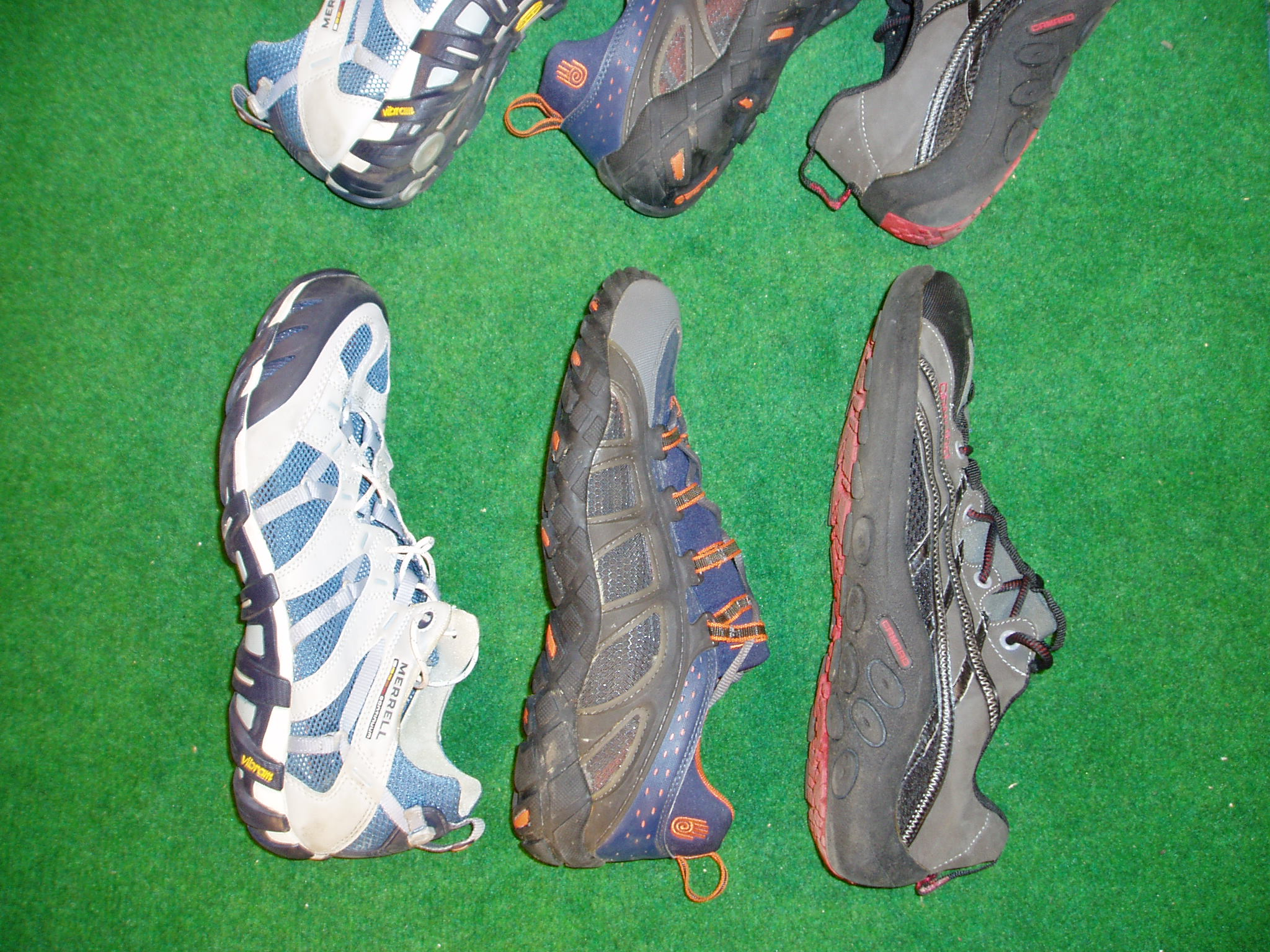
Three pairs of water shoes

A water shoe is a type of footwear that is typically used for activities where the feet are likely to become wet, such as kayaking. Water shoes are usually made of mesh and have a hard sole used to prevent cuts and abrasions when walking in wet, rocky environments. They may often have tiny holes on the bottom or sides of the sole to allow for quick water drainage, which helps the wearer's feet dry faster, keeps the shoe light, and prolongs the lifespan of the material. Additionally, most people do not wear socks with water shoes.

== Types ==
There are several types of water shoes based on the needs of the wearer, ranging from something that resembles a sock to footwear that can function as a sneaker or even a boot.

- Water socks－Maintains the feeling of being barefoot when engaging in water activities. Ideal for swimming and can sometimes be worn inside scuba gear.
- Water shoe－The most common type and can be worn casually in and out of water because it functions as a normal shoe. They can be designed to be able to handle light hiking.

== History ==
Canvas shoes reinforced with rope known as bathing shoes were part of Victorian women’s bathing costumes. They were held in place with ribbons.

Water shoes are also used to protect people's feet in waters with sharp-rocked floors or zebra mussels, in which case their primary purpose is not to keep the wearer's feet dry. In some areas such as the Finger Lakes, wearing water shoes has become essential due to the infestation of sharp-edged mussels.

== See also ==
- List of shoe styles
