= Bakya =

Traditional wooden clogs of the Philippines

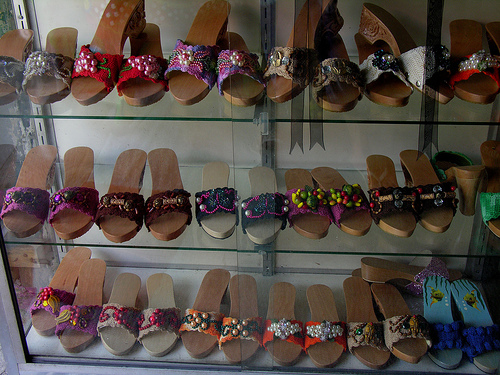
Bakyâ for sale

Bakyâ are wooden clogs that were once the most commonly used footwear in the Philippines before the introduction of rubber sandals. This footwear is made from local light wood like santol and laniti. It is cut to the desired foot size before being shaven until smooth. The side of the bakyâ is thick enough to be carved with floral, geometric or landscape designs, which is unique in Southeast Asia. Afterwards, the bakyâ could then be painted or varnished, traditionally following specifications of the wearer. Uppers of traditional rattan or tight cloth (or modern plastic or rubber) will then be fastened using clavitos (tiny nails). The finished product has long been symbolic of the masses, but it has found renewed favour among the upper classes in the 21st century. A 2014 bill in the Philippine Congress sought to make the bakyâ the "National Slippers" and the "national footwear", and stated that it had "reference to the Filipinos' humble beginnings".

== Use ==
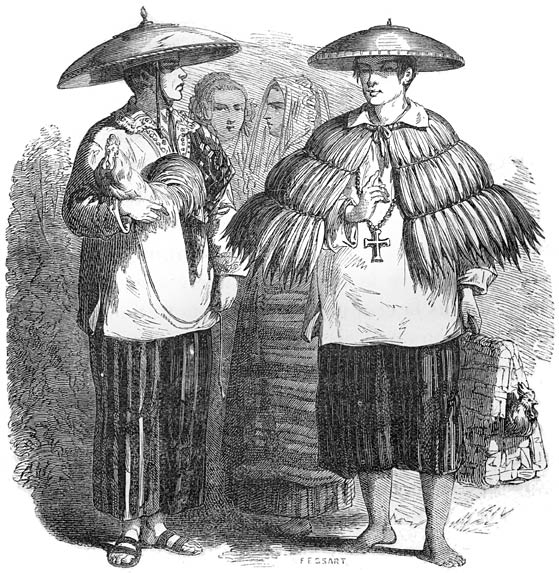
A Tagalog wearing bakyâ in the 19th century. From Aventures d'un Gentilhomme Breton aux iles Philippines by Paul de la Gironiere, published in 1855.

The bakyâ has been in use for centuries in the Philippines, minimally in the pre-colonial era, and widely in the Spanish era in the 16th century to 18th century. Additional designs and motifs were added during the colonial era. Its peak popularity was in the 1950s during the American colonial era and was a common souvenir for Americans visiting the country. However, the bakyâ industry dwindled with the introduction of rubber slippers. By the 1990s it was rarely used although it was a common footwear used during cultural presentations and in Anito lifestyle. By the 2010s, its usage was revived by the upper levels of society and traditionalists. In certain areas in the Philippines, the footwear is also used as gifts for weddings and a form of trophy for competition winners.

== See also ==
- List of shoe styles
