= Venetian-style shoe =

Mid-heel slippers with top part slightly open

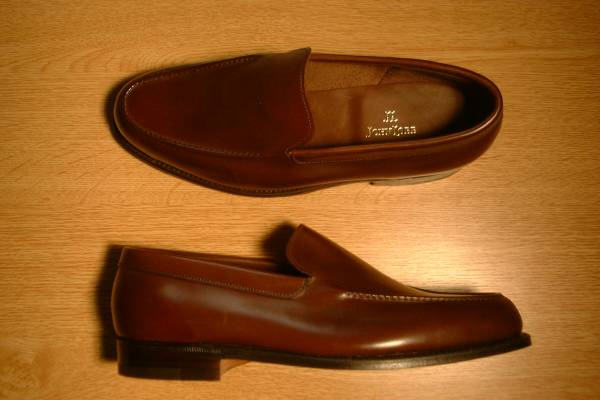
Venetian loafer in dark brown calf made by John Lobb Bootmaker

Venetian-style shoes or Venetian-style loafers are mid-heel slippers with an upper or top part that is slightly open to the kick of the foot and the ankle bone. The venetian-style shoe and its lack of ornamentation contrasts with the loafer which may have slotted straps, vamps and even tassels. The term came from Great Britain.

Loafers are "slip-on shoes with a moccasin toe construction and slotted straps stitched across vamps". A loafer may even be "decorated with metal chains or tassels". A penny-loafer has a "tongue and strap".

By the 20th century, slip-on loafers had become common footwear for men. During this period other popular shoes included low, laced oxfords in various leathers, ankle boots, and specialized sport shoes. During the 1950s, the loafer became fashionable.

== See also ==
- Poulaine
- Shoe
- Slipper
- Chopine
- Loafers
- List of shoe styles
