= Light-up shoes =

Shoe that contains lights

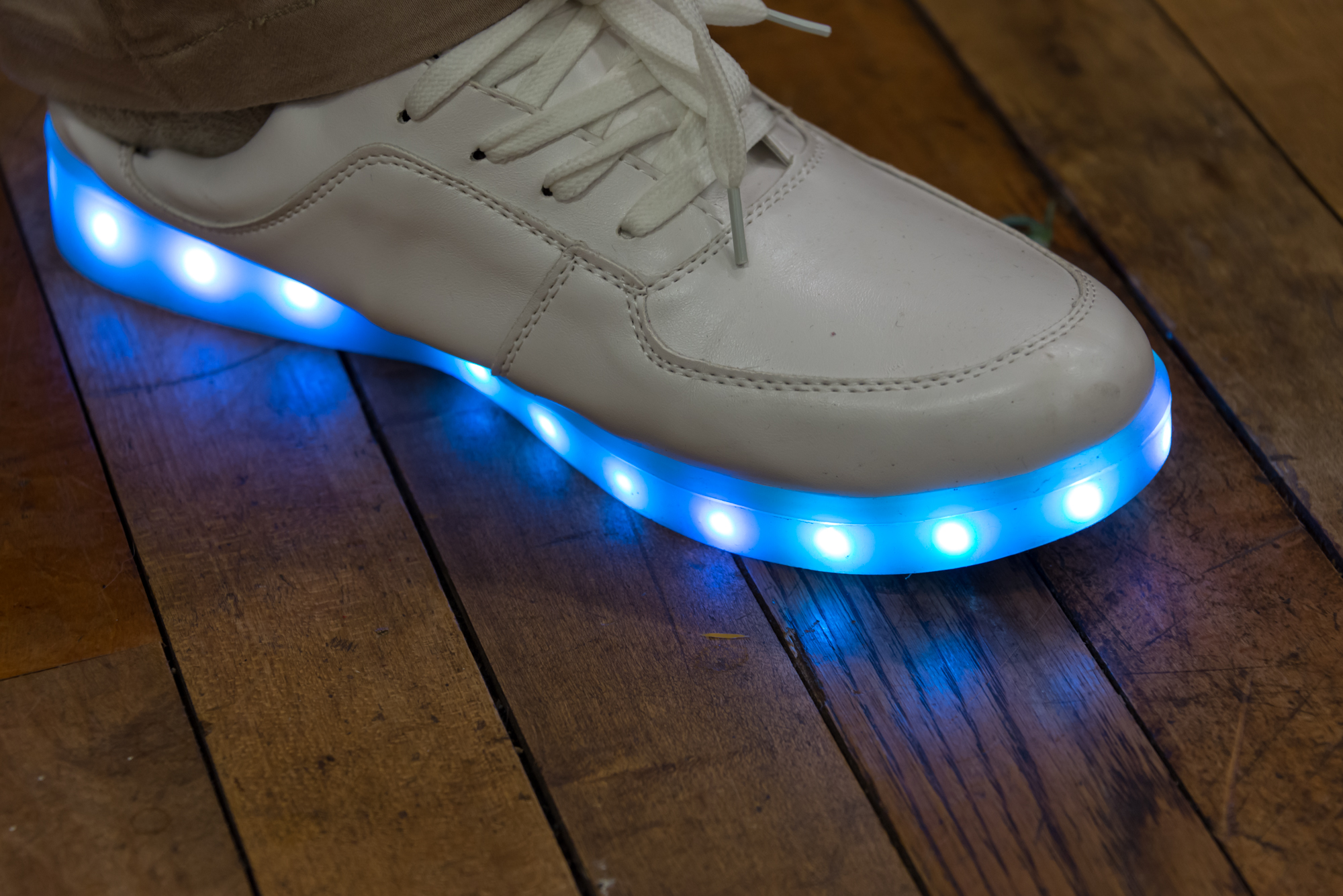
A typical light-up shoe for adults, where the LED ribbon is inside a translucent sole

Light-up shoes or LED shoes are footwear that have built-in LEDs, usually in the sole of the shoe. These specialized shoes may be used at parties, festivals, raves and to increase visibility.

Originally light-up shoes were marketed towards children, and they had a mechanism where the shoe would light up every time the person would step on the ground with them. Ravers use these types of shoes for ostentatious dancing, such as shuffling.

== History ==
The first patent for light-up footwear was developed in the 1930s by Joseph and John Jordan, brothers who owned a boot and shoe repair shop in Oldham, England. In 1934, the Jordan brothers developed a non-flammable celluloid shoe heel containing a hollow space large enough to hold a miniature battery and light bulb. When the wearer brought the heel to the ground, pressure created a contact that caused the bulb to light up.

Despite receiving interest from British manufacturers, the heels never entered mass production.The brothers' insistence on keeping manufacturing local in Manchester, combined with multiple rejections from potential buyers, prevented commercialization. Theater impresario Julian Wylie commissioned shoes for his 1935 production of Puss In Boots at Manchester's Palace Theatre, but the theatrical production ultimately stalled.

British inventor John Mott developed the first piezoelectric light-up shoe in the early 1990s, working with Pennwalt USA to create piezo-electric film technology. This design used a thin, lightweight film that produced a small electrical charge from kinetic energy when the heel impacted the ground. Unlike later battery-powered models, Mott's piezoelectric film could last longer than the average lifespan of a sports trainer and had no impact on the shoe's style or design due to its minimal size and weight.

Asics licensed Mott's technology and integrated it into their GEL performance line, releasing the world's first production light-up running shoe, the Gel Nite-Lyte, in 1993. The shoe was designed as a safety device for runners at night and featured a lithium battery-powered high-intensity lamp in the PVC external counter, utilizing piezo film and computer chip technology.

In 1992, LA Gear introduced "LA Lights," a line of children's shoes with red LED lights in the heels that would illuminate when the wearer's heel hit the ground. Founded by Robert Greenberg, LA Gear marketed the shoes at a $50 retail price at Foot Locker and Kids Foot Locker. The product achieved remarkable commercial success, with LA Gear selling over 5 million pairs of Kids "LA Lights" per year during the 1990s. Light technology for kids became one of the most successful launches in the athletic shoe industry, with over 100 million pairs sold across all distribution channels.

The shoes gained practical utility beyond fashion, as they were used as survival gear to locate stranded individuals and children during blizzards, leading to increased demand prior to storms. In one notable incident in February 1993, seven-year-old Jessica Little of Ripley, Tennessee was found in a cow pasture after dark when the bright orange-reddish light from her LA Gear shoes flickered on and off, making her visible to the 200-person search party.

The original children's LA Lights faced significant environmental and health concerns due to their use of mercury switches. Children's body weight was insufficient to trigger the lights through pressure alone, so LA Gear opted to use mercury to activate the diodes. Mercury is a toxic environmental element that can cause health issues upon exposure, particularly damaging to the nervous systems of children and pregnant women.

As parents became aware of the mercury content, states began taking action. Minnesota banned the sales and distribution of the shoes, and LA Gear was forced to pay $70,000 to aid in disposal efforts. The company also established a toll-free mail-in recycling program that was free to consumers but did not provide refunds or exchanges.

LA Gear subsequently phased out the mercury-based shoes and replaced them with a metal spring mechanism that completed an electrical circuit when jostled. However, these replacement switches were far less precise and prone to issues, with many switches remaining stuck in the "on" position and burning out the shoe's battery in a matter of hours. The diminished quality of the lighting technology contributed to declining sales.

After conflicts with investors over company direction, Robert Greenberg and his son Michael left LA Gear in 1991. Robert Greenberg founded Skechers in 1992, the same year he departed from LA Gear. The company was established in Manhattan Beach, California, initially to handle distribution of Doc Martens footwear in the United States, but quickly pivoted to creating and marketing their own Skechers brand.

Skechers developed the Twinkle Toes line, which became extremely popular with girls who wanted to stand out and have fun.The line features rhinestone-decorated toes, bright lights, and bold colors, with shoes that light up with each step. Unlike LA Gear's original design, Skechers' modern light-up shoes use pressure-activated LED technology and are marketed as providing sparkle to everyday activities for school, playgrounds, and home use.

Beginning around 2015, Skechers light-up shoes, including the S-Lights, Shopkins, and Twinkle Toes lines, faced legal challenges related to the use of Nickel-Cadmium (Ni-Cad) rechargeable batteries. At least one class action lawsuit was filed alleging that the batteries encased in the shoes were capable of exploding and causing severe chemical burns to wearers' lower extremities.

Multiple lawsuits alleged that Skechers was aware of the battery issues as early as July 2017, when the company began routinely contacting consumers who reported problems and offering replacement shoes. In 2018, a New York mother filed a lawsuit claiming her nine-year-old son suffered second-degree chemical burns on his feet after his Skechers S-Lights got wet during a water play day at school.

In 2016, light-up shoes experienced a resurgence in popularity among adults, particularly in festival and rave culture. Modern LED shoes for adults feature significant technological upgrades including USB-rechargeable lithium-ion batteries, full multi-color LED strips, fiber-optic materials, and control features such as on/off switches, remotes, and app integration. These modern shoes are marketed for concerts, parties, raves, and festivals, with LED lights lasting approximately 6 hours on a single charge.

== Market Segmentation ==
The contemporary light-up shoe market operates across three primary segments:

Children's Market: Dominated by Skechers' Twinkle Toes and S-Lights lines, featuring pressure-activated lights primarily marketed to girls and young children for everyday wear.

Nostalgia Market: LA Gear's revival as a heritage brand, selling retro 1990s styles updated with modern USB-rechargeable lights and marketed to adults seeking vintage aesthetics.

Festival/Rave Market: Direct-to-consumer brands offering high-visibility LED and fiber-optic shoes designed for electronic dance music events, raves, and parties, emphasizing visual impact and customization features.

== See also ==
- List of shoe styles
