= Ho Chi Minh sandals =

Sandals made from tires, distinctive to the Viet Cong

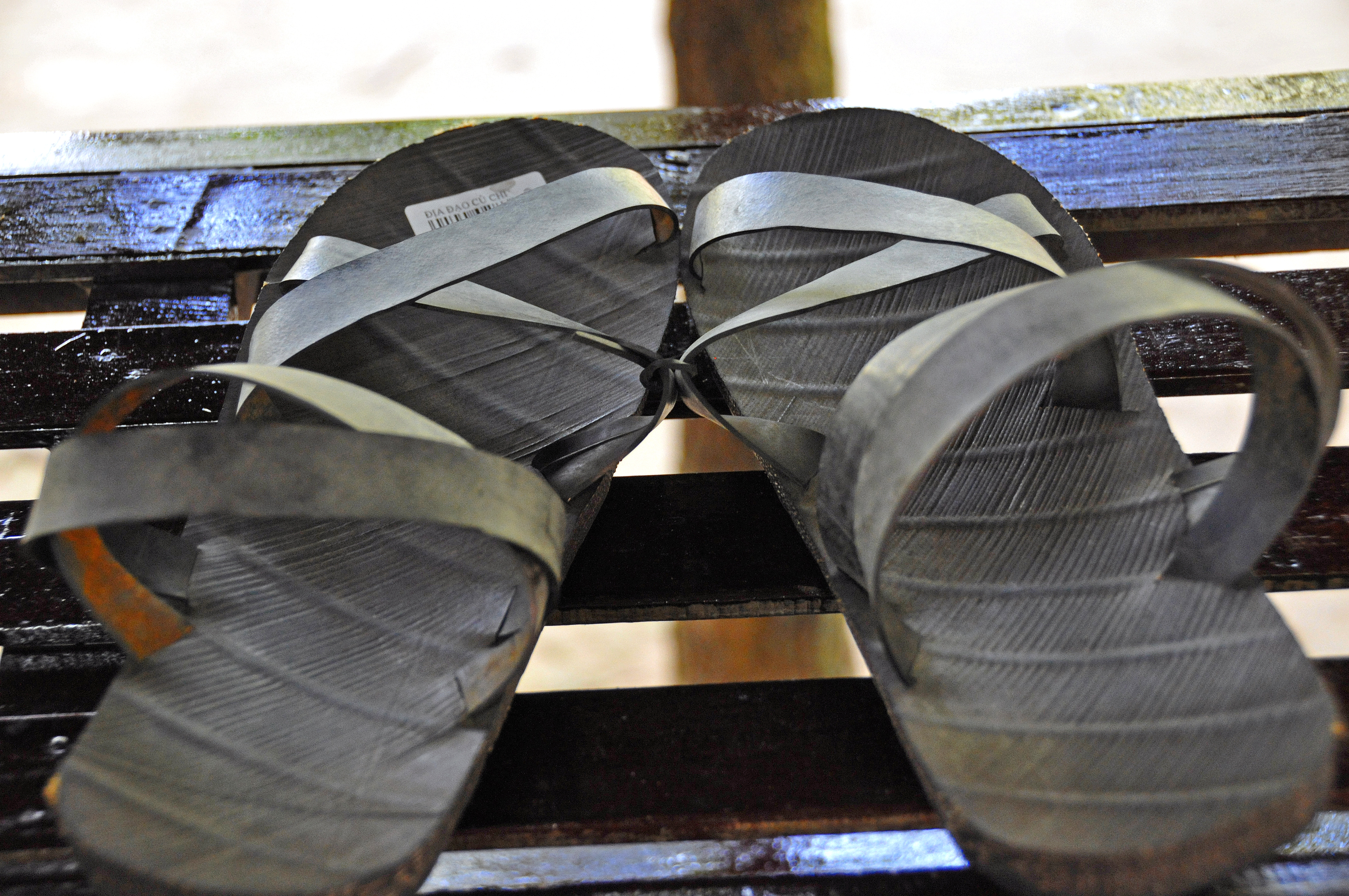
A pair of "Ho Chi Minh sandals" in the Củ Chi tunnels

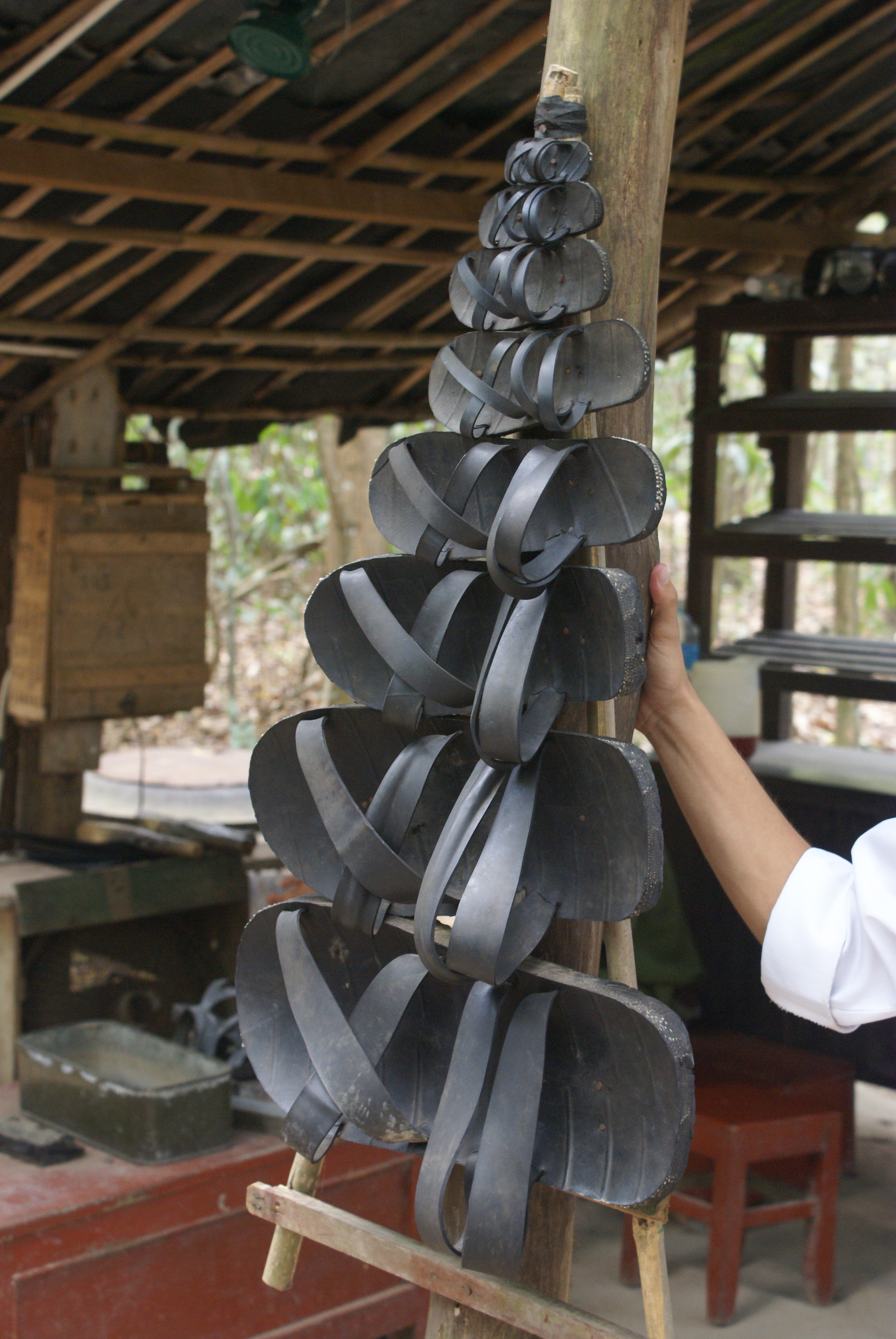
A rack of tire-sandals on sale in the 2000s

The Ho Chi Minh sandals (Vietnamese dép lốp "tire sandal") are a form of sandal made from discarded tires. Along with the khăn rằn scarf, they were a distinctive clothing of Viet Cong soldiers. These shoes were often called "Ho Chi Minh sandals" or "Ho Chis" by Americans, after the Vietnamese leader Ho Chi Minh.

In Kenya, tyre sandals are mostly worn by the Maasai people

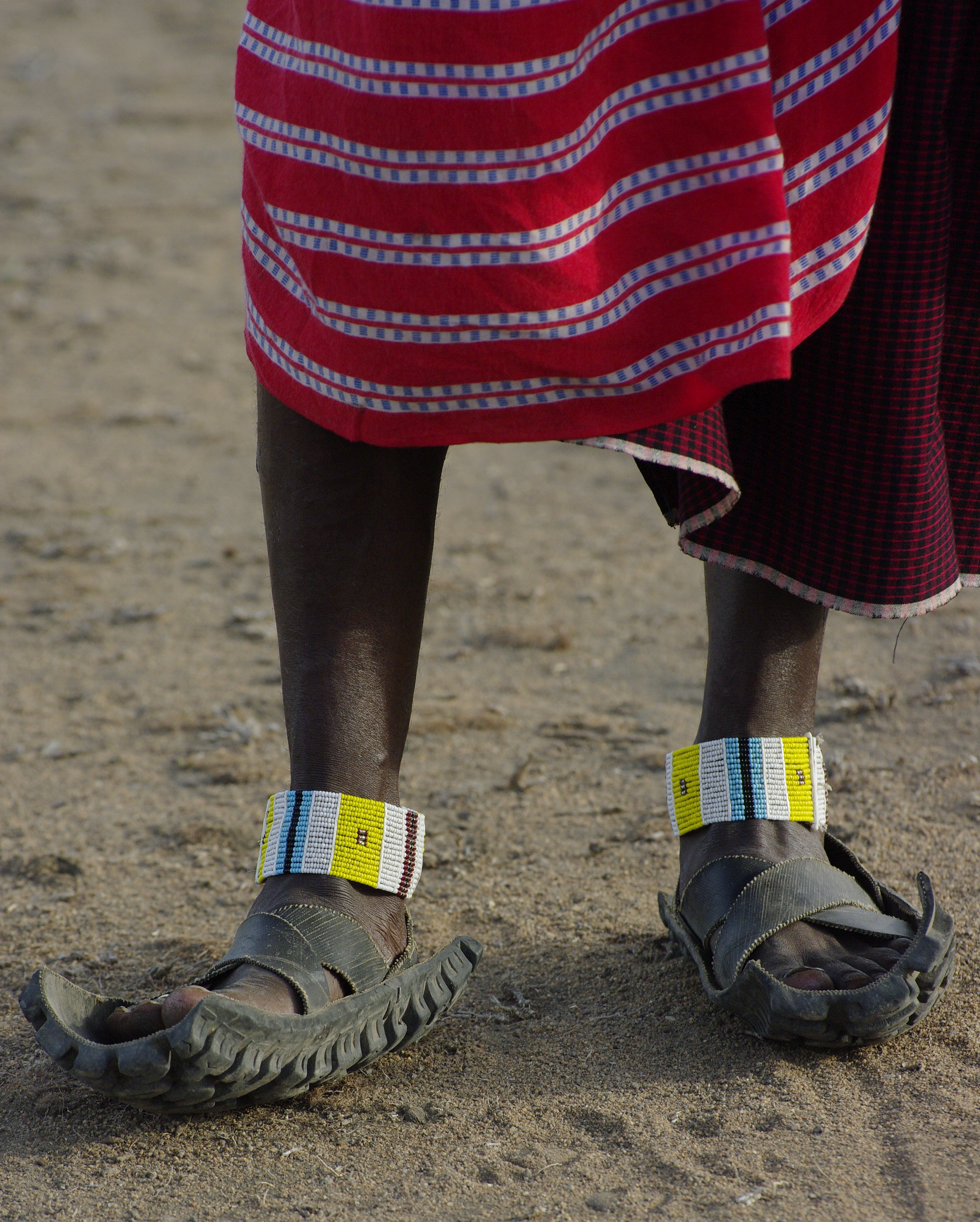
Maasai man in Akala shoes

== See also ==
- List of shoe styles
- Huarache (running shoe)
