= Walk-Over shoes =

American shoe brand

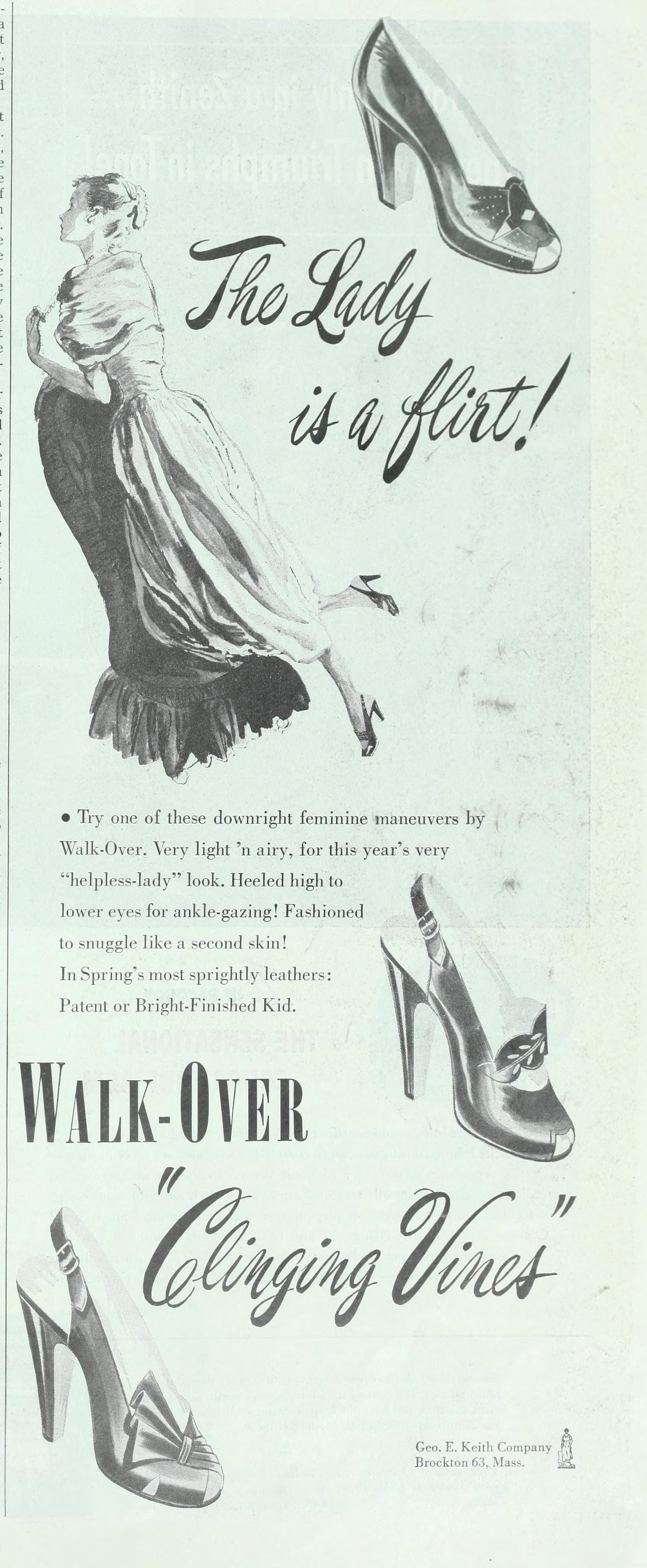
Ad in Ladies home Journal for Walk-Over ladies shoes

Walk-Over shoes is a historic shoe brand in the U.S. It was founded in 1874 by George Eldon Keith under the name George E. Keith Co. He donated land to Brockton, Massachusetts and Keith Park was named for him.

Shoemaking was a family business, though the brand gained recognition and popularity over the years, with George E. Keith (February 5, 1850 – December 8, 1920) opening a factory and expanding the business. In 1899, a store was established in London, and in 1902, a women's shoe line was introduced.

By 1920, Walk-Over had multiple production plants, factories, a distribution center in St. Louis, and stores in England and France. It also had stores in various cities, including Detroit and Chicago, with the Detroit store located at 152 Woodward Avenue. Walk-Overs were even sold by L.L. Bean when it operated as a shop.

The shoes were made in the Campello section of Brockton, Massachusetts, as well as Middleboro, Massachusetts. In 1919, Keith gave a talk at the Waldorf Astoria hotel in New York City about Walk-Over's export business. The company filed an unfair competition suit against a store selling shoes as Walk-Overs that were not from the company.

Walk-Over also made shoes under contract for department stores. Walk-Over released a postcard set of 24 famous Americans to advertise its shoes.
