= Shoe heel =

Built-up or elevated part of footwear that supports the heel of the wearer

The heel is the bottom rear part of a shoe.

== Function ==
Its function is to support the heel of the foot. They are often made of the same material as the sole of the shoe, or of wood, plastic, rubber etc., possibly with a bottom layer a different material. This part can be high heels for fashion or to make the person look taller, or flat for more practical and comfortable use. On some shoes the inner forward point of the heel is chiselled off, a feature known as a "gentleman's corner". This piece of design is intended to alleviate the problem of the points catching the bottom of trousers and was first observed in the 1930s. A heel is the projection at the back of a shoe which rests below the heel bone. The shoe heel is used to improve the balance of the shoe, increase the height of the wearer, alter posture or other decorative purposes.

The heel and the sole come in contact with the ground. The geometry and material of the heel is an important factor in avoiding slipping.

Rocker shoes have a heel which is more elevated than the sole, and thus does not usually come in contact with the ground.

Modifications to heels for orthopaedic purposes include the Thomas heel.
