= List of boots =

In this list of boots, a boot type can fit into more than one of the categories, and may therefore be mentioned more than once.

== Forms ==
- Hip boot
- Knee-high boots
- Over-the-knee boot
- Thigh-high boots
- Wedge boots
- Chap boots
- Moccasins

== Styles ==
- Burki boots
- Chelsea boots
- Chukka boot
- Dress boots
- Cowboy boots
  - Mexican pointy boots
- Fashion boots
- Go-go boots
- Hessian (boot)
- Mukluks
- Pointed toe boots
- Rigger boots
- Russian boots
- Ugg boots
- Valenki

=== Sport boots ===
- Cowboy boots
- Chelsea boots
- Drysuit boots
- Engineer boots
- Football boots
- Harness boots
- Hiking boots
- Motocross boots
- Motorcycle boots
- Motorcycle cop boots
- Mountaineering boots
- Racing boots
- Rain boots
- Sailing boots
- Seaboots
- Ski boots
- Snowboard boots
- Snow boot
- Touring boots
- Waders
- Wetsuit boots

=== Work boots ===
- Australian boots
- Hobnail boots
- Caulk boots
- Cowboy boots
- Gumboots (mainly workwear)
- Hip boots (waders or fishing boots)
- Wellington boots (rubber or farmer boots)
- Galoshes (overshoes)
- Logger boots
- Rigger boots
- Seaboots
- Steel-toe boots (safety boots)
- Snow boots

=== Equestrian boots ===
- Cavalry jackboots
- Riding boots
- Field boots
- Dress boots
- Hunt boots
- Top boots
- Paddock boots
- Jodhpur boots
- Postillion boots
- Cowboy boots
- Hessian boots

=== Military boots ===
- Army Combat Boots
- Cold weather boots
- Combat boots
- Desert Combat Boots
- Jump boots (paratrooper boots)
- Mountain Combat Boots
- Tanker boots
- Cavalry jackboots
- Hobnailed jackboots
- Jungle boots

=== High-heeled boots ===
- Caulk boots
- Cowboy boots
- Desert boots
- Fashion boots
- Go-go boots
- Platform boots
- Pointed boots
- Riding boots
- Thigh-high boots

=== Brands ===
- Alden
- Ariat
- Blundstones
- Chippewa
- Doc Martens
- The Frye Company
- Hush Puppies
- Meindl
- Merrell boots
- R. M. Williams
- Rocky
- Georgia Boot
- Durango
- Red Wing
- Sorel
- Steger Design
- Timberland
- Tony Lama
- Tricker's
- UGG Australia
- Warmbat
- Wesco Boots
- White's Boots
- Wolverine World Wide

==== Licensed ====
- Caterpillar
- Harley-Davidson
- Patagonia Footwear
- Xtratuf

== See also ==
- List of shoe styles
