= Motorcycle boot =

Boots worn to protect a motorcyclist

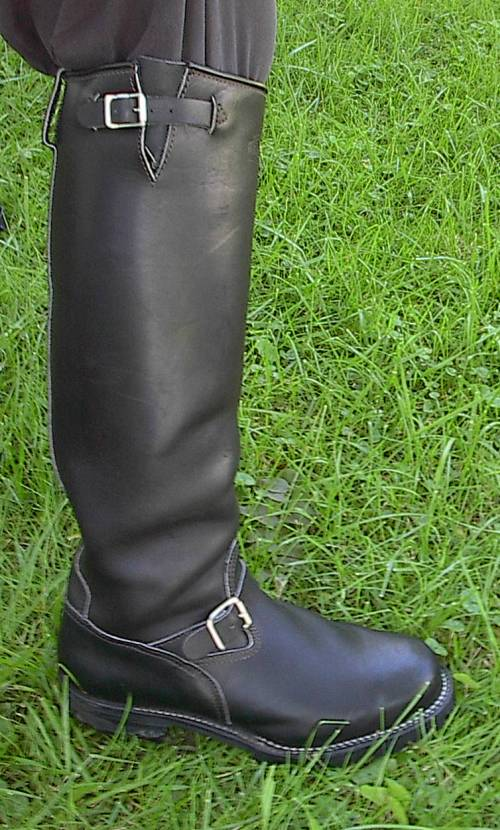
An engineer boot

Motorcycle boots are associated with motorcycle riders and range from above ankle to below knee boots. They have an outside of a typical boot but a low heel to control the motorcycle. To improve motorcycle safety, motorcycle boots are generally made from a thick, heavy leather and may include energy absorbing and load spreading padding, metal, plastic and/or composite materials to protect the motorcycle rider's feet, ankles and legs in an accident. For use in wet weather, some boots have a waterproof membrane lining such as Gore-Tex or SympaTex.

Depending upon how form-fitting the boot is, to allow a rider to easily get the boot on or off, the shaft may be designed to open lengthwise. If so, Velcro or another hook and loop fastener is typically used on the inner sides of the opening to allow the rider to close the boot over the foot, ankle, and leg. This allows for some flexibility for the rider to control the boot's tightness. Some manufacturers also include an internal quick-lacing system between a soft inner leg and the harder outer shell of the boot shaft to further ensure a tight, but comfortable fit. The heel of a racing boot is typically very low: not more than 1/2-inch (13 mm), and sole of the heel and foot is typically rather smooth. A curved plastic or composite plate may be included to cover the shin of the boot to protect the rider's shin.

== Protection from injury ==
Lateef (2002) found: "Lower limb injuries represent the commonest form of injury among motorcyclists involved in [road traffic accidents]." Subsequently, Kortor et al. (2010) also established that: "Lower limb injuries represent the commonest form of injuries among the motorcycle accident victims. Fractures were the commonest type of injury seen and the most common location was shaft of tibia." And an earlier study at UCLA found: “Lower extremity injuries are among the most common injuries sustained by motorcycle riders in crashes and often lead to extended and costly medical treatment and permanent disability.”

Regarding injury risk reduction, University of Lyon research found: "knee-high or ankle boots [...] reduced foot and ankle fracture risk."

== Racing boots ==
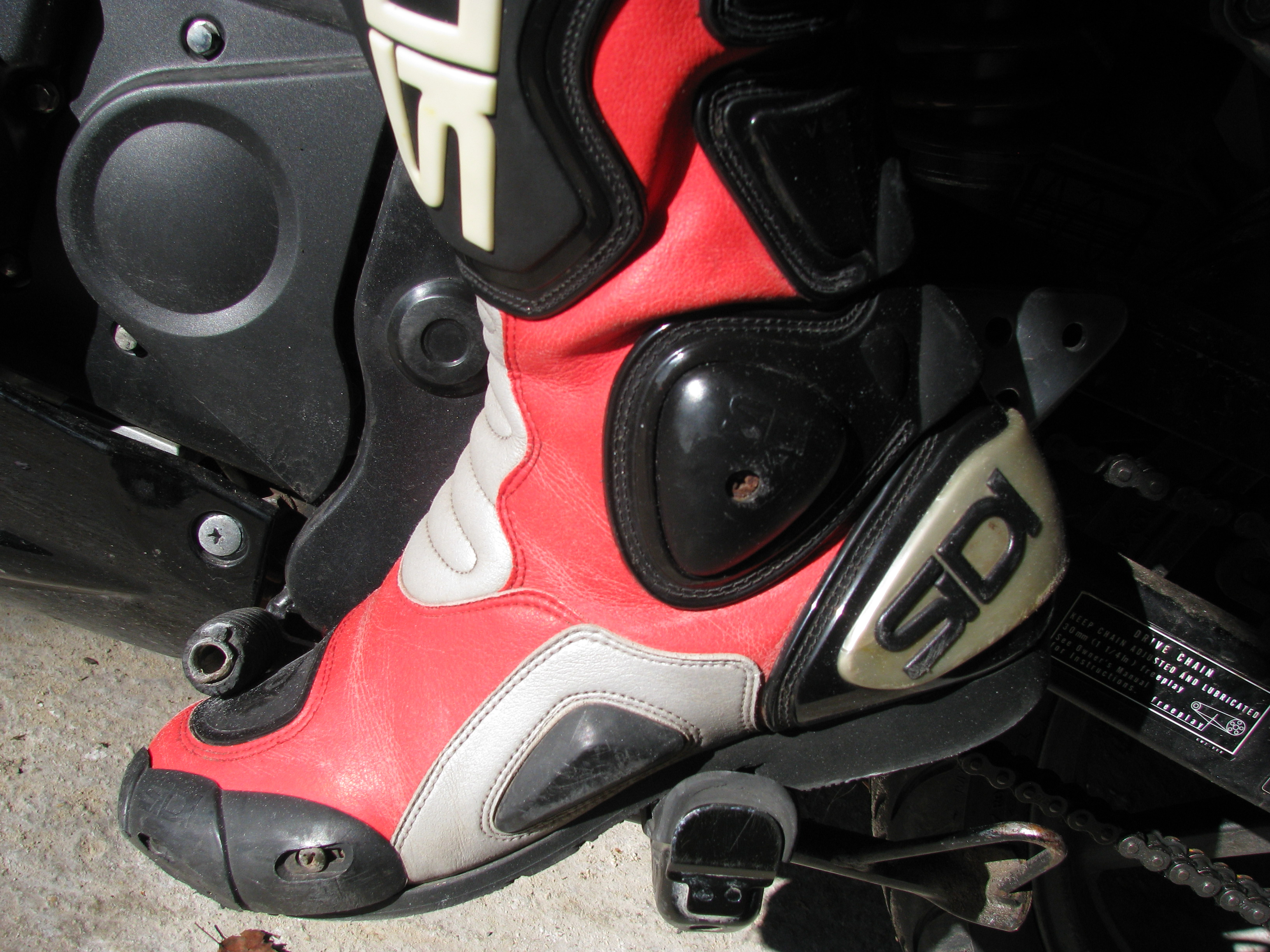
A racing boot

Similar to touring boots, racing boots are designed for riding a motorcycle on hard pavement (either the street or a race track) and are usually between 10 and 14 inches in height and made from a combination of leather, metal, plastic and/or man-made composite materials to create a form-fitting, but comfortable boot. The amount of armored protection provided by racing boots is usually greater than touring boots due to the increased potential for injury at the high speeds needed for racing. Typical protection areas are reinforced to protect the shin, instep, ankle (medial and lateral) heel and toes. Often a high-wear pad of metal or composite is attached to the lateral side (outside) of the toe, as this area can contact the ground during extreme cornering. The optimum racing boot has the necessary protection for impact and abrasion while maintaining excellent single-axis flexibility at the ankle between the boot lower and the shaft; for shifting and braking.

Styles vary between "inside" and "outside" boots. Some types are meant to be worn over the trouser leg. Others, such as Dainese boots for MotoGP, are designed to be worn inside the trouser leg.

== Touring / street boots ==
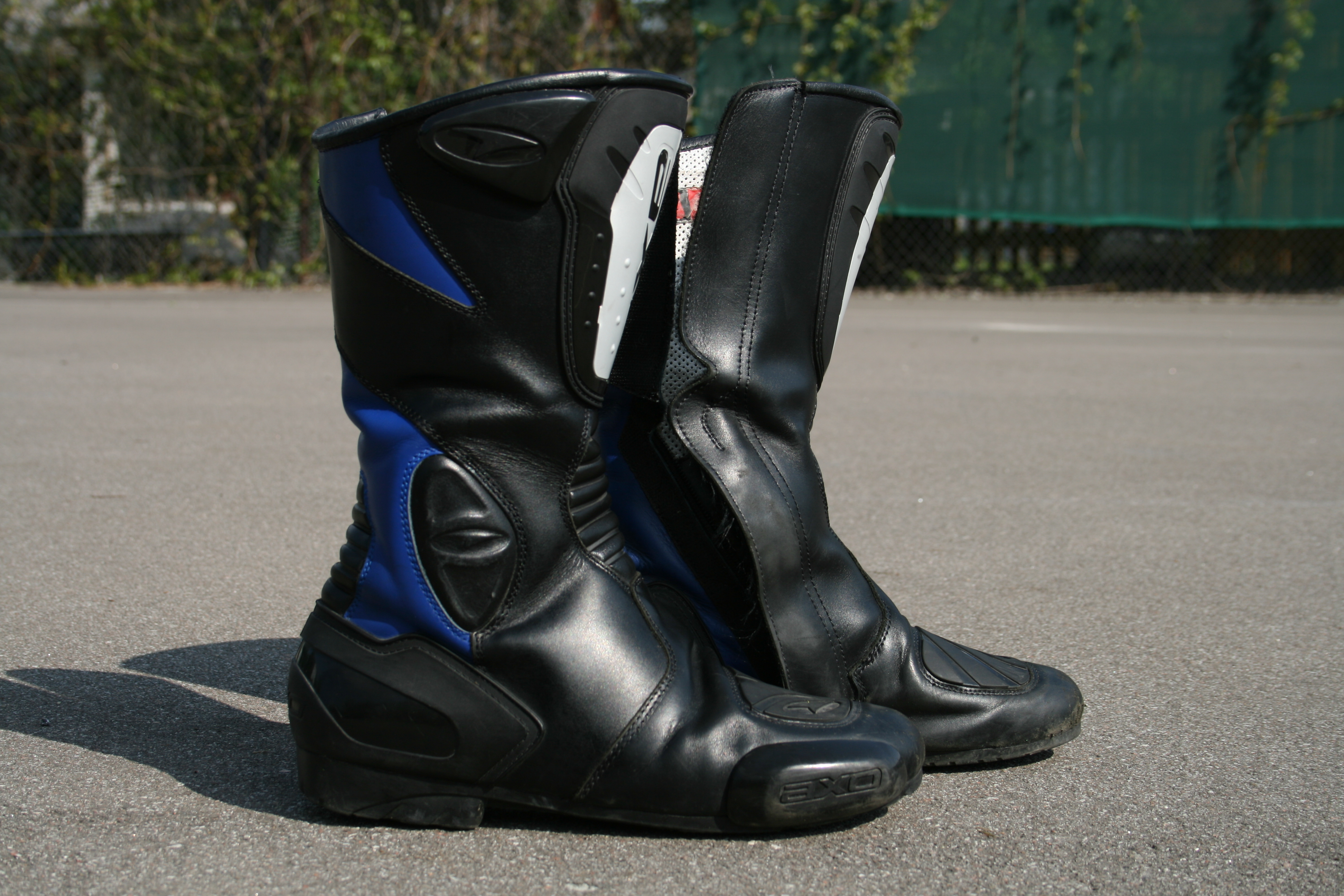
Touring boots by AXO

Similar to racing boots, touring boots are designed specifically for riding a motorcycle on hard pavement, but with less armored protection than racing boots since they are intended for riders that typically ride on city streets and highways, not race tracks. They are usually between 10 and 14 inches in height and made from a combination of leather, metal, hard rubber, plastic and/or man-made fabrics to create a form-fitting, but comfortable boot.

== Motocross boots ==
Motocross boots are designed specifically for off-road, motocross (MX) or all-terrain vehicle riding. To help prevent a rider's feet and legs from being injured, motocross boots are typically much stiffer than regular motorcycle boots or racing boots, but are more flexible than ski boots by comparison.

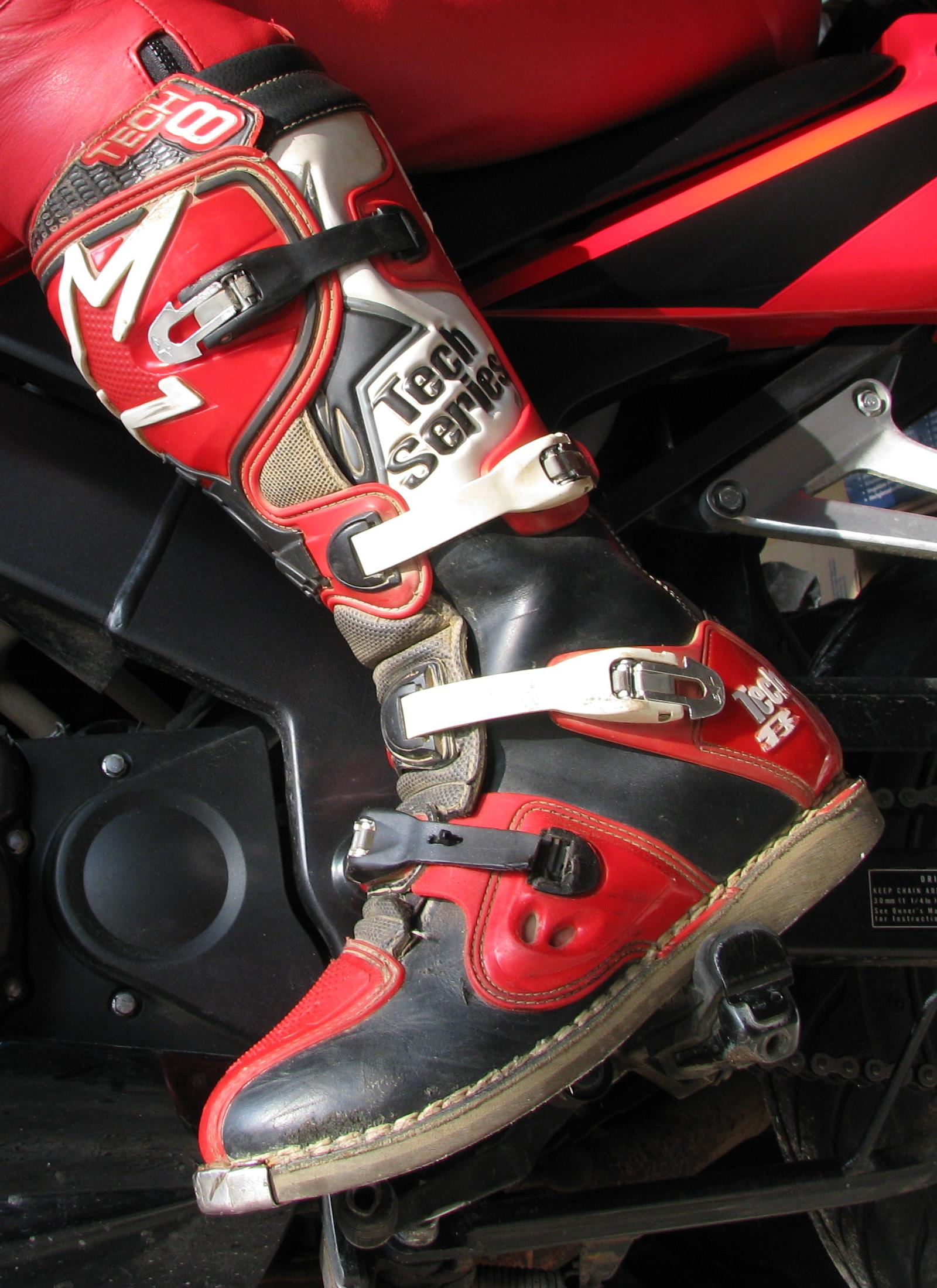
A motocross boot.

Modern motocross boots are usually nearly knee-high (about 16 inches in height) and made from a combination of leather, metal, plastic and/or man-made composite materials to create a very form-fitting, comfortable and tight boot. To allow a rider to easily get the boot on or off, the shaft of a motocross boot is designed to open lengthwise. Multiple adjustable straps (usually 3 to 4) are deployed along the foot, ankle and shaft of the boot to allow the rider to tighten the boot to their preferences and comfort. A curved plastic or composite plate covers the shin of the boot to protect the rider from debris that may be thrown from the front wheel of the motorcycle.

== Police boots ==
Motorcycle police boots are designed specifically to be worn by motorcycle police officers. Very similar to riding boots, motorcycle police boots are typically knee-high (between 18 and 21 inches in height), the foot and shaft are made from black, smooth-grained, high-gloss leather and the low-heeled sole is made from hard rubber. The boots are typically form-fitting and intended to be worn over breeches or jodhpurs as part of the officer's uniform. The most notable manufacturers for boots to the UK police force are Goldtop (pre 1980s), and Alt-berg (post 1980s).

== Engineer boots ==
Engineer boots are a long-established style of boots used by people in a number of occupations in addition to motorcyclists.

== Harness boots ==
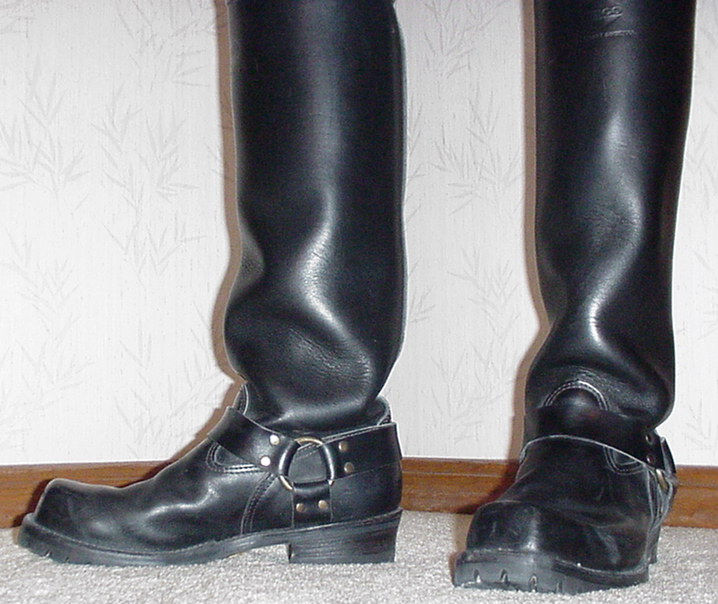
Wesco Harness Boots

Harness boots are very similar to engineer boots. The boots are most often made of heavy weight leather and range in height from short (10 inches) to extra high (38 inches). The most typical height is between 10 and 18 inches. The most common color is black, but brown harness boots are also made.

Harness boots are designed to protect the motorcycle rider from the heat of the exhaust pipes and the engine block and from injury to the foot and leg in the case of an accident while riding and may include a built-in steel toe cap and metal shank in the heel. Whereas engineer boots have a rounded toe, harness boots typically have a square toe. Unlike engineer boots that have an adjustable leather strap across the ankle, harness boots have a non-adjustable system of four leather straps and two metal rings: one strap goes across the top of the foot at the ankle, one strap wraps around the rear of the foot at the ankle and two more straps rise from sole on either side ankle. The four straps are held in place by the two metal rings that are located on either side of the ankle. Typically, these boots possess a pair of pull-straps on either side of the tops of the shafts. Some manufacturers replace these straps with an adjustable leather strap located on the outside top of the shafts, similar to engineer boots. Soles and heels are usually made of hard rubber and may either be relatively flat or may have lugs for increased traction.

Harness boots were originally modeled on the square toed boots prevalent in the 19th century, including those worn by American Civil War soldiers. Leather straps and rings were added to this style in the 1960s, creating the modern version of the harness boot, which quickly became a classic.

== CE certification of motorcycle footwear ==
=== Minimum tests ===
There is a European standard available for motorcycle boots, and it is a legal requirement in Europe and the UK for these boots to be CE certified. This EN13634 standard is titled "Protective footwear for motorcycle riders – Requirements and test methods". It is a European harmonized standard published throughout Europe and in the UK by BSI. It tests them for resistance to abrasion, penetration by sharp objects and lateral crushing. The label consists of a motorcycle icon, the designation of the test they've passed and then a series of four numbers. The more '2's on the CE label, the more protective the boot.

These numbers will be either a '1' for a Level 1 pass (lower protection) or a '2' for a Level 2 pass (higher protection). From the left, the numbers correspond to: the boots' Height, its Abrasion Resistance, its Impact Cut resistance, and its Traverse Rigidity. For Height, 1 is short, and 2 is tall. For other categories, 1 denotes rudimentary protection, while 2 indicates better protection.

==== Abrasion resistance ====
The abrasion resistance test is designed to check how well boots will prevent injury from abrasion. For testing, the boot is divided into two areas – Area A covers the sole, front and back of the boot, where you're most likely to find stretch panels, and everything else is Area B. Three samples of material are cut from the boot, and each is held against a moving abrasive belt until a hole appears. The shortest time it took for a hole to develop in one of the samples dictates the boot's abrasion rating. For basic Level 1 approval, samples cut from area A must last 1.5 seconds, and samples from area B need to last five seconds. To reach the higher Level 2, area A samples need to last 2.5 seconds or longer, while area B must survive at least 12 seconds without wearing through.

==== Impact cut ====
Next, the boots are tested to see how they’d hold up if they came up against a sharp object. For this, a blade attached to a mounting block is dropped onto a sample of the boot; apparatus measures how far the blade goes through the boot. The tests use the same areas as the abrasion test (see above) and the blade is dropped at different speeds to test each area. When testing area A, the knife will be dropped at two metres per second (m/s). For a Level 1 and a Level 2 rating, the knife can't protrude through the material by more than 25mm. Area B is tested by dropping the blade at 2.8m/s. For Level 1 approval, the blade can't go through the sample by more than 25mm. To pass Level 2, the maximum it can go through is 15mm.

==== Transverse rigidity ====
The transverse rigidity test determines how strongly the boot can resist your foot being crushed if a bike's weight fell on it. The boot is laid down with the widest part of the foot positioned between two plates. These plates squash together at a rate of 30mm per min. Apparatus records the force required to compress the sole at that rate. The machine is turned off when the plates stop squeezing the sole, when the force is clearly remaining constant or when the sole has been crushed by 20mm. This test is repeated three times. If it took less than 1kN of force to compress the sole to 20mm, the boot fails. If it took 1kN-1.4kN the boot takes a Level 1 pass and if it needed 1.5kN or more to compress the sole it achieves a Level 2 pass.

=== Optional additional tests ===
Manufacturers can submit their boots for six optional extra tests. Motorcycle News noted that "Manufacturers can also request that their boots are subjected to additional tests in order to receive further accreditation." These tests include 'IPA' for ankle or shin protection, 'WR' for water resistance or 'WAD' for the displacement of water from inside. Passes in these tests will be represented on the label with letters underneath the mandatory test ratings.

IPA/IPS – Impact protection to the ankle and/or shin: These show boots with approved impact protection. For this test, the boot is cut along the sole and opened up; a striker is used to drop 10 joules of force onto the protector. To pass this test, the protector can't allow more than 5kN to be transmitted through it. If the ankle protection passes, the letters IPA will be on the label, and shin armour will be displayed as IPS.

WR – Resistance to water penetration: Boots that claim to be water resistant should be tested in one of two ways. They can be clamped to a machine with the toes flexing to replicate 4600 steps while the foot is submerged in water, or a person can wear the boot and walk 1km (100 x 10-metre lengths) in shallow water. To pass in either method, areas of dampness inside the boot can be no bigger than 3cm².

FO – Resistance to fuel and oil on sole: Two samples of a boot are weighed twice – once normally and once in distilled water. The sample is then left soaking in fuel at 23 degrees for 22 hours, taken out and weighed in the same ways again. To pass, the weight of the samples shouldn't increase by more than 12%.

SRA/SRB/SRC – Slip-resistance of sole: Three tests make up the one rating for slip resistance. Each test is done with a mechanical heel set at a seven-degree angle, which moves to imitate different kinds of slips and falls on different surfaces. If the label shows ‘SRA’, the sole will have passed on a ceramic tile surface treated with diluted soap. ‘SRB’ means it passed on a steel floor treated with glycerol. ‘SRC’ means the boot passed both tests.

B – Breathability of uppers: If a CE label has the letter B on it, it means the boot has gone through an optional test to check that moisture vapour can escape.

WR – Water absorption/desorption of inner: The boots are tested to see how much water the insides hold and how much they release. If the boots pass this test, ‘WAD’ will be displayed on the label.

== See also ==
- Jackboot
- List of boots
- List of shoe styles
- Outline of motorcycles and motorcycling
- Riding boot
