= Geopolymer bonded wood composite =

Geopolymer bonded wood composite (GWC) are similar and a green alternatives to cement bonded wood composites. These products are composed of geopolymer binder, wood fibers/ wood particles. Depending on the wood and geopolymer ratio in the material, the properties of the wood-geopolymer composite material vary.

== Function ==
The main functions of wood in the composite material are weight reduction, reduction of thermal conductivity and the fixture function whereas the main functions of geopolymer are bonding of wood particles, improvement of fire resistance, providing mechanical strength, improvement of humidity resistance and protection against fungal and insect damages.

They serve similar functions and purposes like all other mineral bonded wood composites. The fact that the binder agent (geopolymer) are mostly produced from industrial residue and waste puts these materials at a greater advantage over other mineral bonded wood composites. However, most of the works under this topic remains at the research and development phase. Some of the core difficulties in production and commercialization of standardize product is the variation in the sources of the aluminosilicate binder and the cost involve in activating the binder. Currently, metakaolin binder remains as the one key source to produce or bind these products with huge variations in other sources of the binder such as slag, fly ash etc.

== Uses ==
The inherent properties and the incorporation of wood fiber and particles in this composite, has made it possible to produce GWC building materials that are light weight and has a variety of uses due to its heat storage capacity, for example in areas of thermal insulation, fire and noise protection. The wood-geopolymer composite material in the building walls can serve as a microclimate regulator absorbing the moisture when the air humidity is high and returning the moisture when there is a low air humidity period, thus improving the hygrothermal comfort in the building.

== Commercialization ==
Currently, there is no commercialization of these products. More research is still ongoing on these composite materials as to ascertain the properties and how best to utilize these materials.

== See also ==
- Composite plate
