= Waders =

Waders may refer to:

- Wader, a name for various birds in the order Charadriiformes
- Wading bird, long-legged birds in the orders Ciconiiformes, Pelecaniformes and Phoenicopteriformes, known as waders in North America
- Waders (footwear), a type of waterproof boot
