= White's Boots =

American shoemaking company

White's Boots, Inc.
- Company type: Private
- Industry: Apparel and footwear
- Founded: Pre-Civil War
- Founder: Otto White family
- Headquarters: Spokane, Washington, U.S.
- Website: whitesboots.com

White's Boots is an American shoemaking company based in Spokane, Washington that specializes in making handcrafted leather work boots. The company produces their handcrafted shoes in the U.S. using American sourced leather and materials.

== History ==
White's originally began before the American Civil War as a family business that crafted boots for loggers in Virginia. In 1902 the company relocated to St. Maries, Idaho and then settled in Spokane 13 years later. After moving to the inland northwest region of the United States, White's began selling their boots primarily to members of the forest industry. Following years of service, the company established itself in the area, and became a popular item among loggers, construction workers, and Wildland firefighters. The boots have become especially popular among Wildland Firefighters, and their most popular style is a boot called the "Smoke Jumper" which was created specifically to fulfill the needs of Wildland Firefighters.

More recently the company has drawn interest from members of the fashion community, as there has been a renewed interest in obtaining Americana wear.

== Buyout ==
In July 2014, White's Boots was sold to LaCrosse Footwear of Portland, Oregon, which also owns Danner Boots. LaCrosse Footwear's chief financial officer, Kirk Layton, cited the made-in-America heritage of White's Boots as a motivating factor for the buyout. LaCrosse Footwear is itself owned by Tokyo-based retailer ABC-Mart.

== See also ==
- Red Wing Shoes
- West Coast Shoe Company
- LaCrosse Footwear
