= Hip boot =

Waterproof boots reaching to the hips

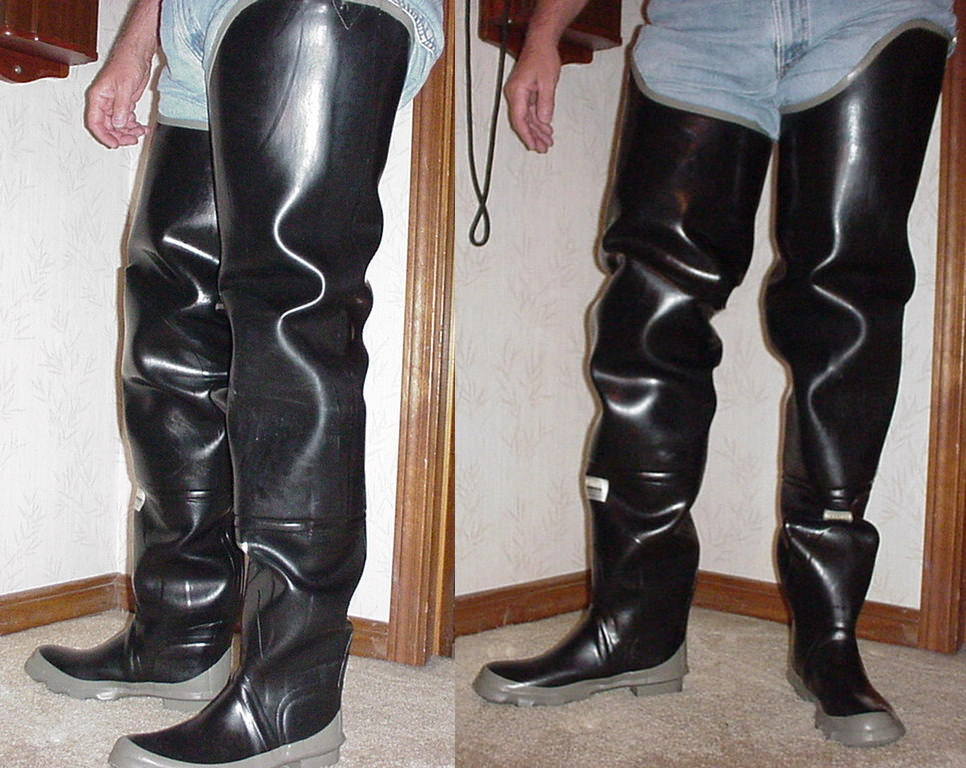
- Type: Footwear
- Material: Rubber

Hip boots, or hip waders as they are sometimes called, are a type of tall boot initially designed to be worn by river fishermen. Hip boots are typically made of rubber, they may also be made of PVC, nylon and/or polyester. Other materials, such as wool, cotton and foam, are used to add warmth and comfort. The boots completely cover the legs, up to the tops of the thighs or all the way up to the waist. Hip boots are designed to protect the wearer from water, and allow wading out into deeper waters. They also help to keep the feet and legs warm.

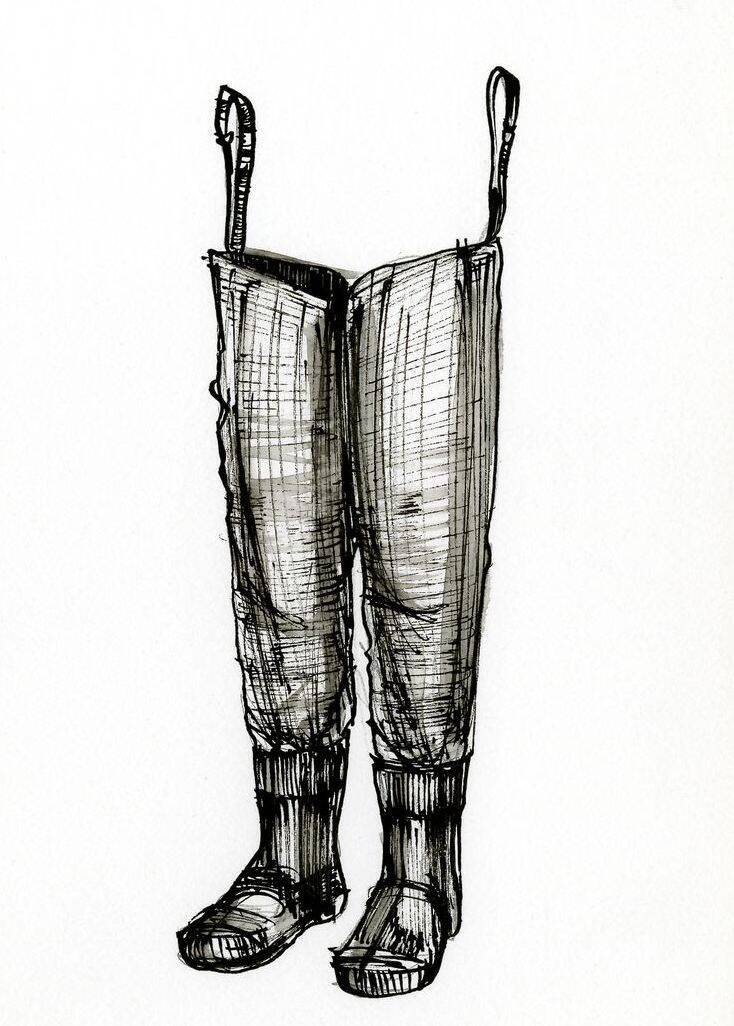
Sketch of hip boots

Hip boots are also worn by many ecologists, environmental scientists, and aquatic biologists who do tests in swamps or lakes to determine the quality of water.

Hip boots are necessary footwear during flooding.

== See also ==
- List of boots
- List of shoe styles
