= Rigger boot =

Type of safety boot in the UK

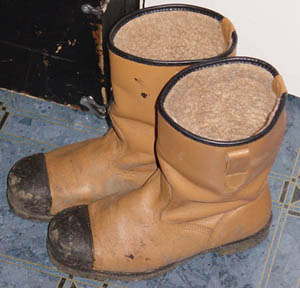
A pair of typical rigger boots

A rigger boot is a type of pull-on safety boot in the United Kingdom. The name "rigger" comes from their use by workers on the offshore oil rigs in the North Sea. Nowadays they are worn by manual workers as a general purpose workboot.

Riggers, as they are commonly nicknamed, are usually tan in colour and go approximately third of the way up the leg and feature a steel toe cap for safety. Other distinguishing features of the boots include pull-on loops around the top of the boot's shaft and internal fur lining.

Many rigger boots are unbranded or generic brands, some of which may have steel toe caps which may not conform to the EN-345 standard, and some workplaces concerned about their lack of adequate ankle support now ban them.

The boots are sometimes made in other colours, such as black, where they can be worn as fashion items in the punk and heavy metal scenes.

== See also ==
- List of boots
- List of shoe styles
