= Snow boot =

Type of footwear

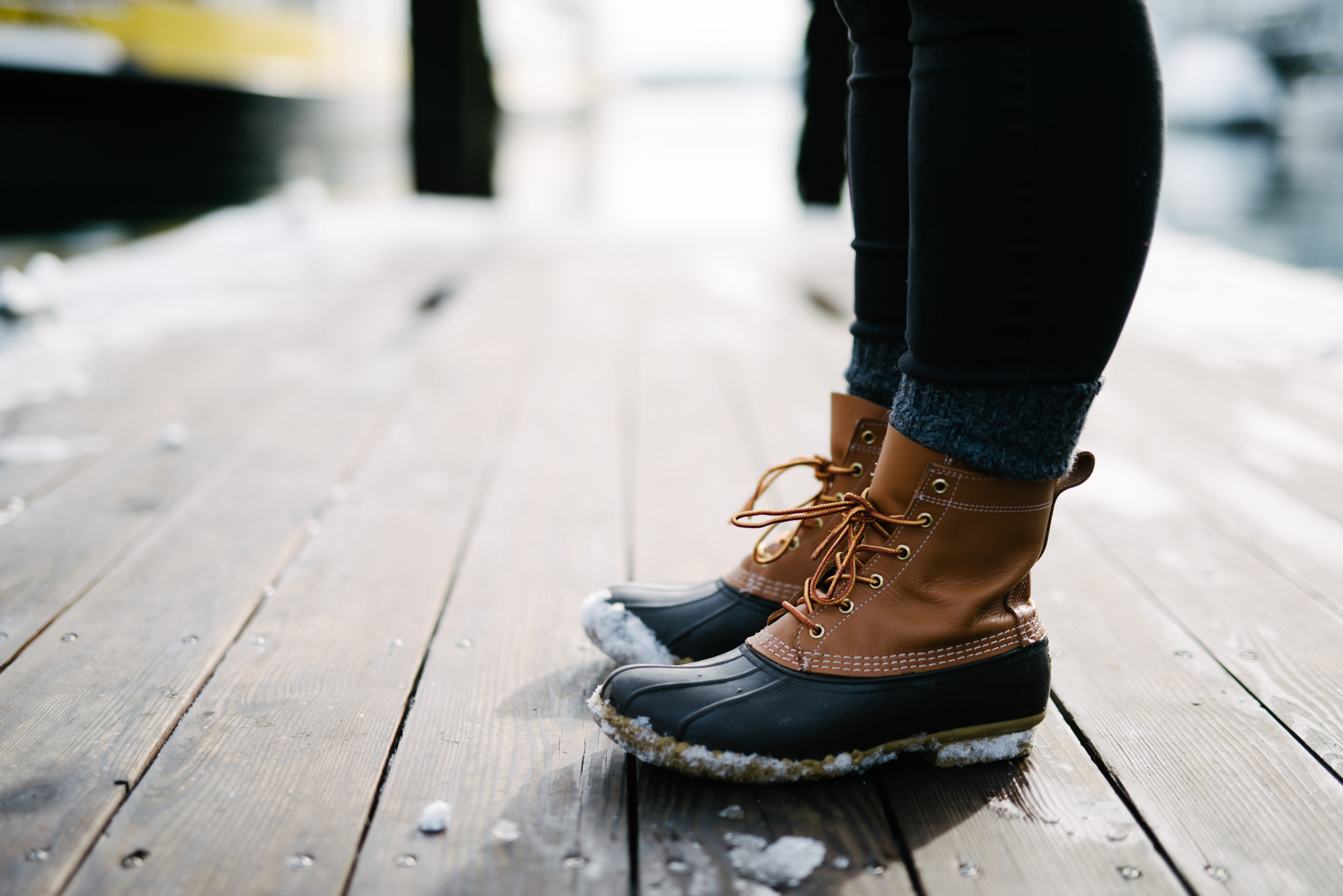
A person wearing snowboots

A snowboot is a type of boot, generally waterproof or water-resistant. The boot, in almost all cases, has a high side, keeping snow from entering the boot, and a rubber sole, to keep water out. Snowboots are used in wet, slushy, muddy, and snowy situations.

== Uses ==
Snowboots are used by people to easily walk in snowy or wet situations, and by children playing in snowy, relatively wet, or muddy lawns, fields, etc. They are also usable for walking in streams in winter, as they are well-insulated, while still waterproof.

== Difference between snow boots and other boots ==
Snow boots have many differences between them

- Snow boots are waterproof or water resistant, but winter boots are not.
- The two boot types have different uses. The snow boot is used on very wet or snowy conditions, while winter boots are better used on well-maintained roads or paths, or even while shopping.
- Snow boots are made of easy-to-clean materials, but winter boots are not. However, this cleanability and waterproofing comes at the cost that snow boots are heavier, less breathable, and more expensive.
- Snow boots always extend partway up the leg, unlike hiking boots.
- Snow boots are always moderately to heavily insulated, with the insulation under the waterproof/water-resistant layer.
Examples of snow boots

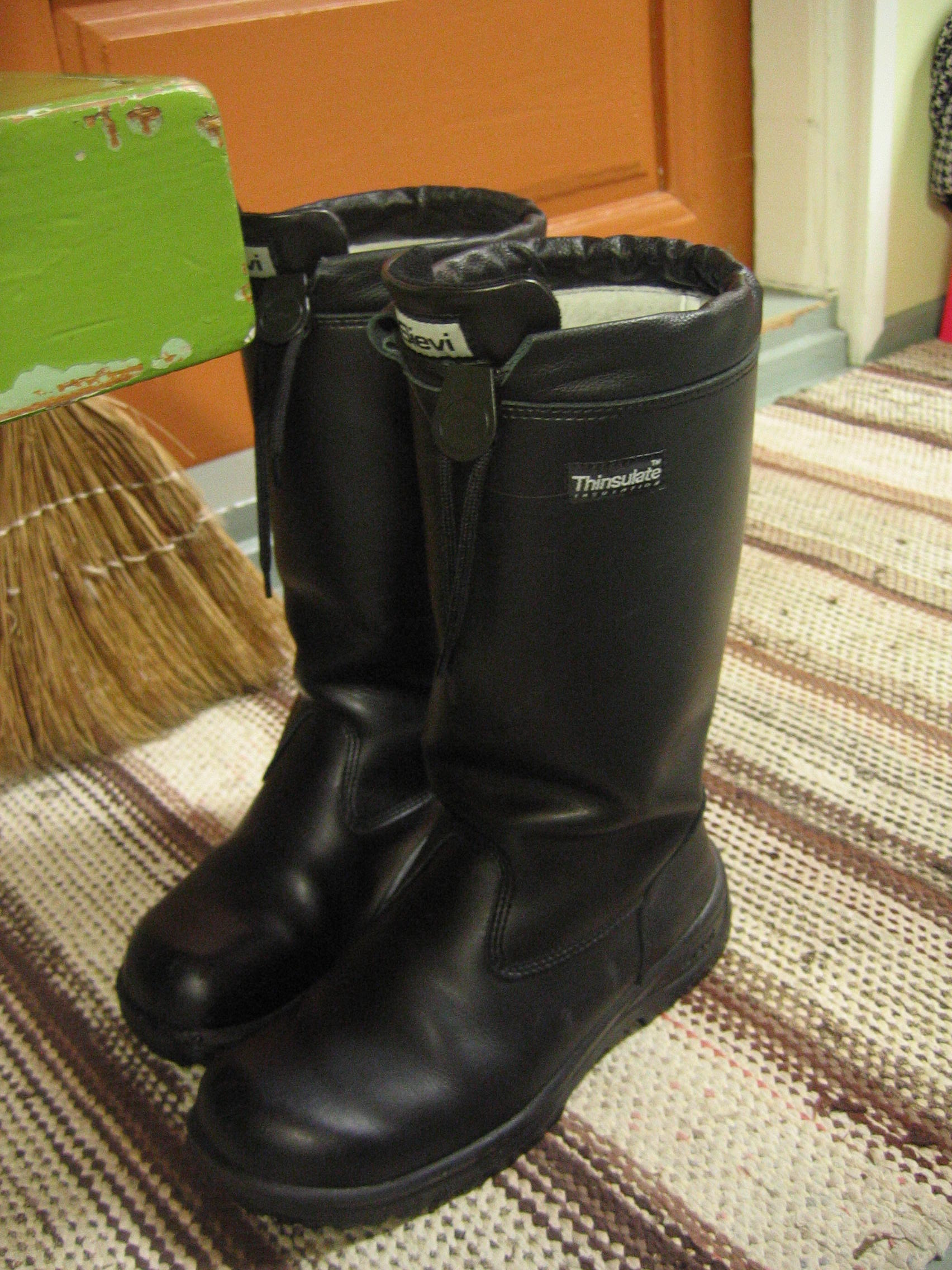
Snow boots

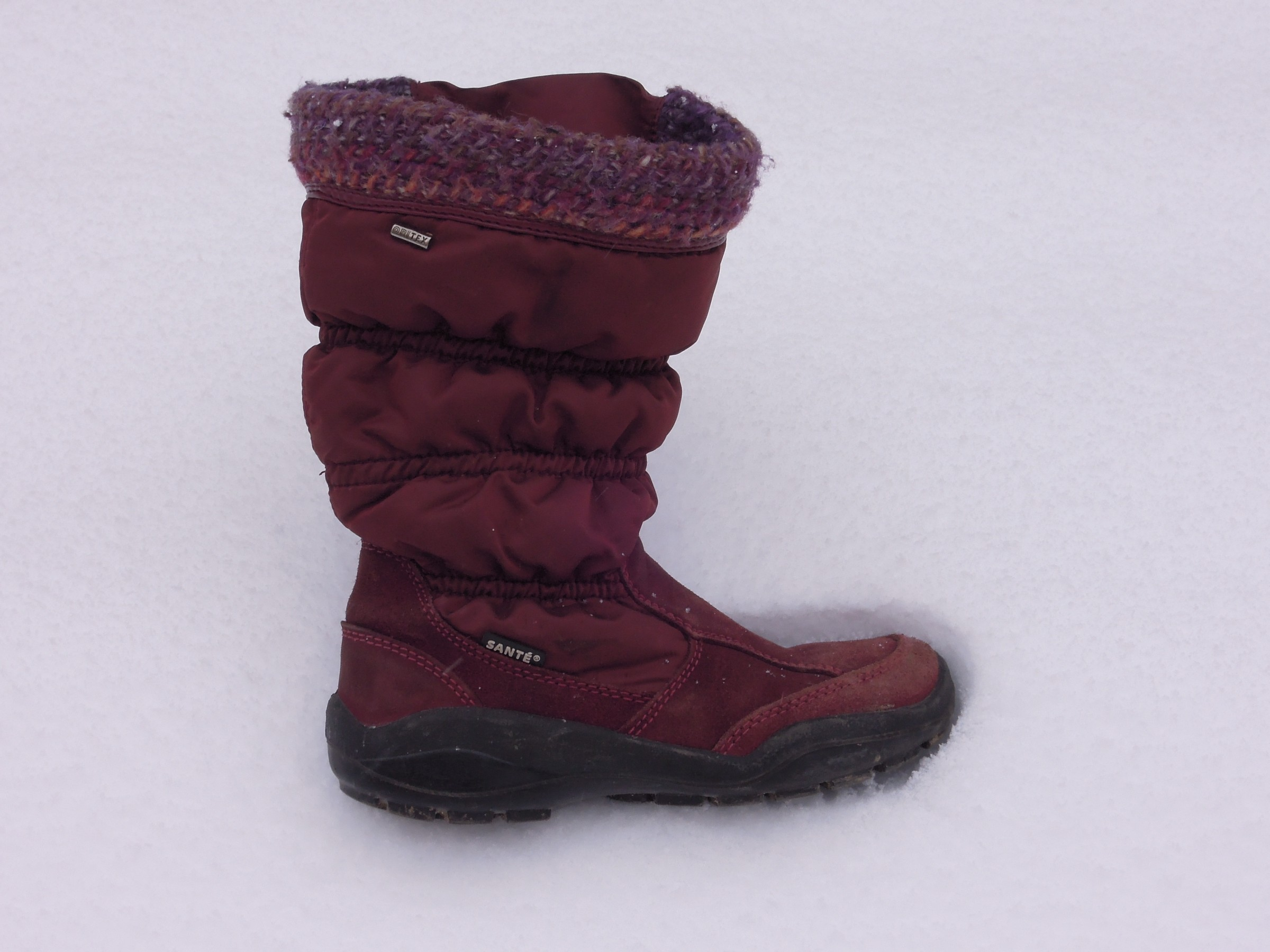
Side view

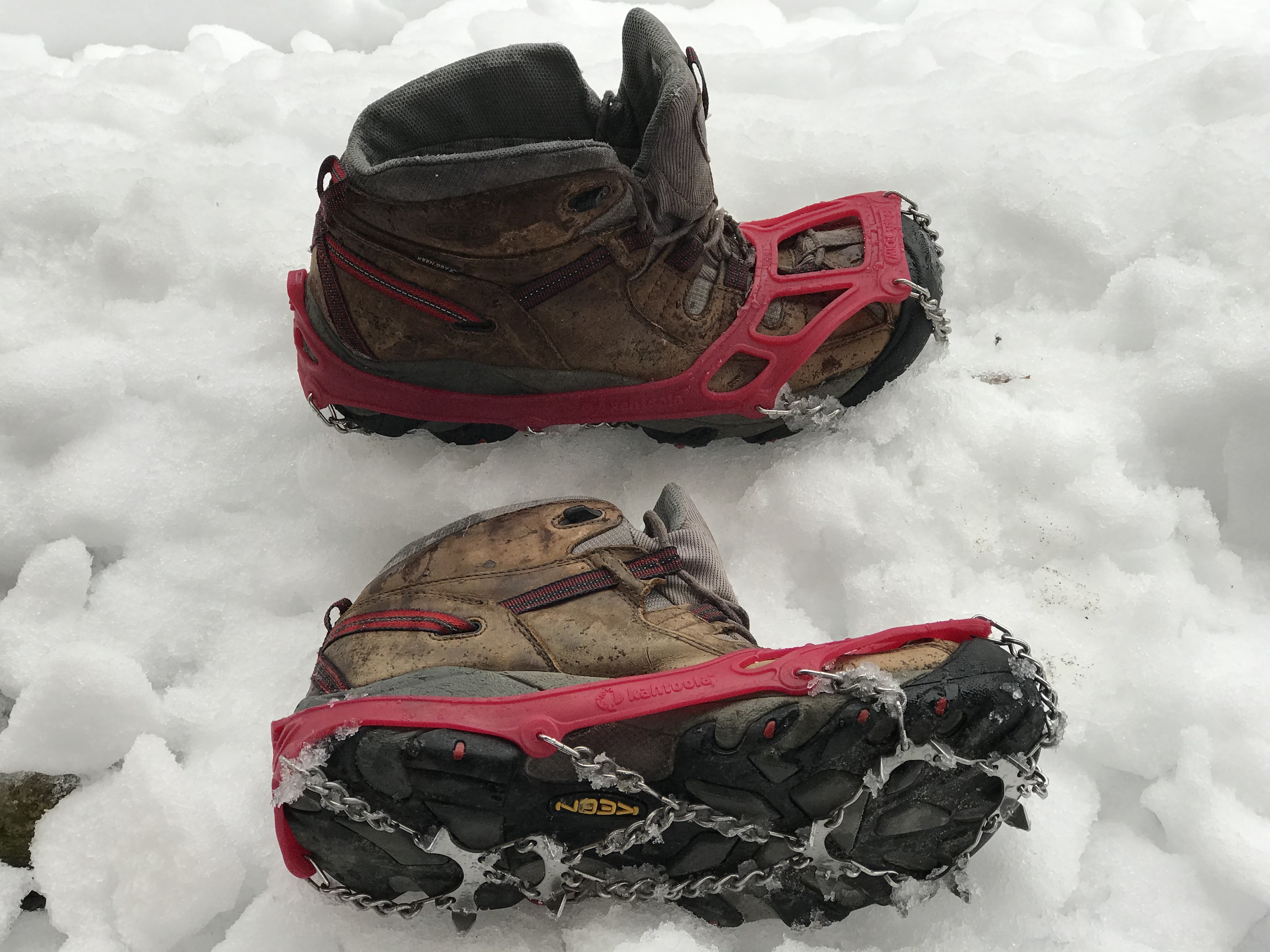
Snow boots with spikes

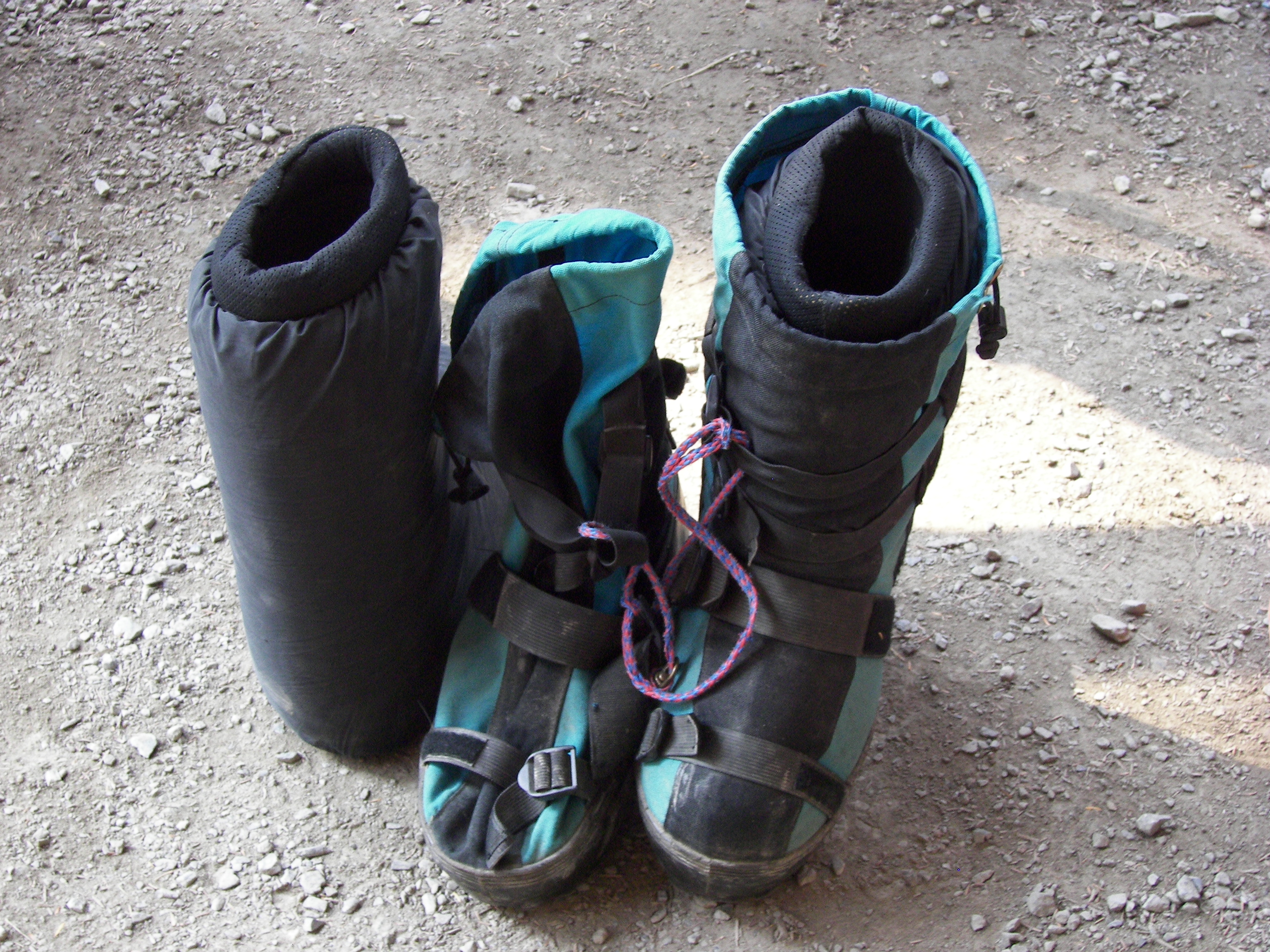
Removable lining

== See also ==
- Ski boot
- Boot
- List of boots
- List of shoe styles
