= Jodhpur boot =

Type of riding boot

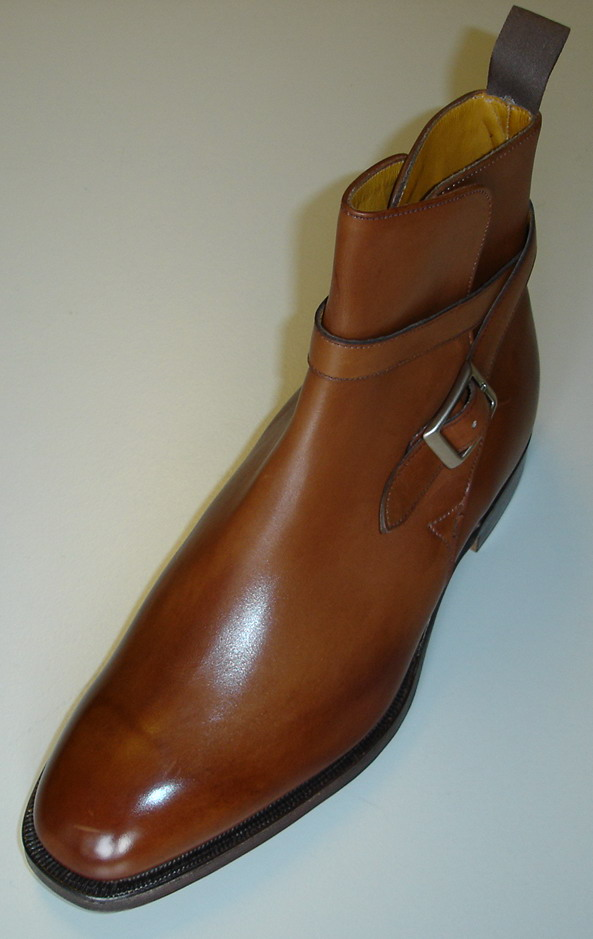
Fashion Jodhpur boot with classic ankle strap

The Jodhpur boot is an ankle boot designed as a riding boot with a rounded toe, strap with buckle, and a low heel.

== History ==
Jodhpur boots originated in India in the 1920s, and were first worn by British polo riders. The wearing of Jodhpurs soon became a trend in the Western world, and Saks Fifth Avenue began selling them in as early as 1927. A Vogue article in that year, titled "A Habit for Informal Cross-Saddle Dressing", wrote that Jodhpur boots were "correct in every detail for summer shows" and meant to be complemented with a swagger stick and canary string gloves.

== Fitting ==
The vamp is sewn on top of the quarters. (A monk strap boot also fastens with a buckle, but the quarters are sewn on top of the vamp.) The strap is typically in two parts, each attached to the vamp. The buckle end is attached to the inboard side and extends halfway around the ankle, counterclockwise on the right boot. The free end is attached to the outboard side and extends entirely around the ankle, clockwise on the right boot. There is typically a loop sewn to the back of the boot that both strap ends can be passed through.

== See also ==
- List of boots
- List of shoe styles
- Jodhpurs
- R. M. Williams (company)
- Blundstone
