= Seaboot =

Waterproof sailing boot

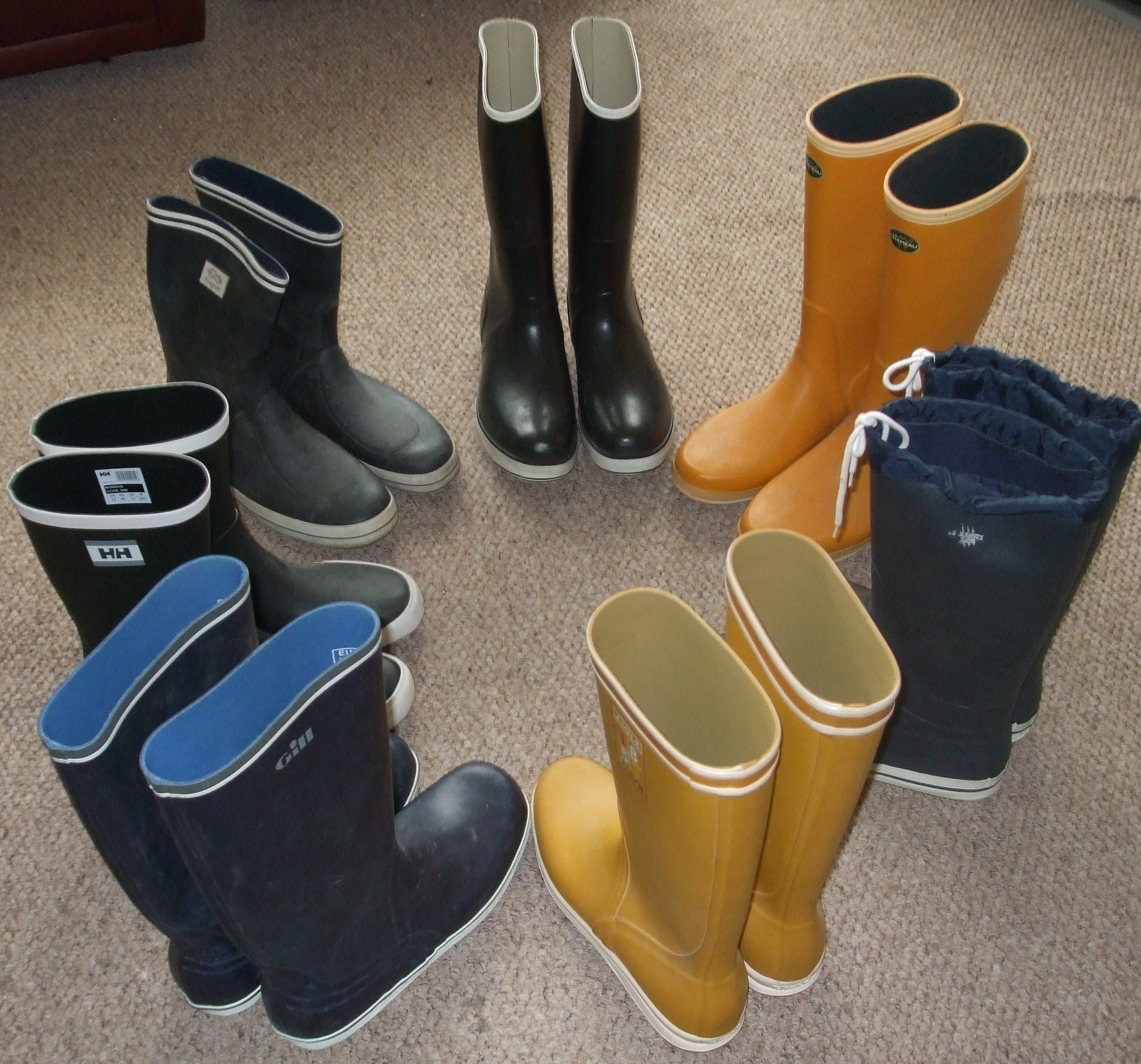
Clockwise from top: Sperry Top-Sider, Le Chameau, Jeantex, Aigle, Gill, Helly-Hansen and Newport short and tall rubber sea boots..

Seaboots, also known as sailing boots, are a type of waterproof boot designed for use on deck on board boats and ships in bad weather, to keep the legs dry, and to avoid slipping on the wet rolling deck. The most common fabrics are Gore-Tex and leather.

Unlike Wellington boots, seaboots have non-marking, slip-resistant soles in order to avoid any damage to the vessel's deck. They are also thinner, and require thermal socks as the rubber does not provide enough warmth.

Seaboots traditionally have large openings to enable a sailor to kick them off in the water to better be able to swim in an emergency.

== See also ==
- List of boots
- List of shoe styles
