= Steel-toe boot =

Footwear reinforcement

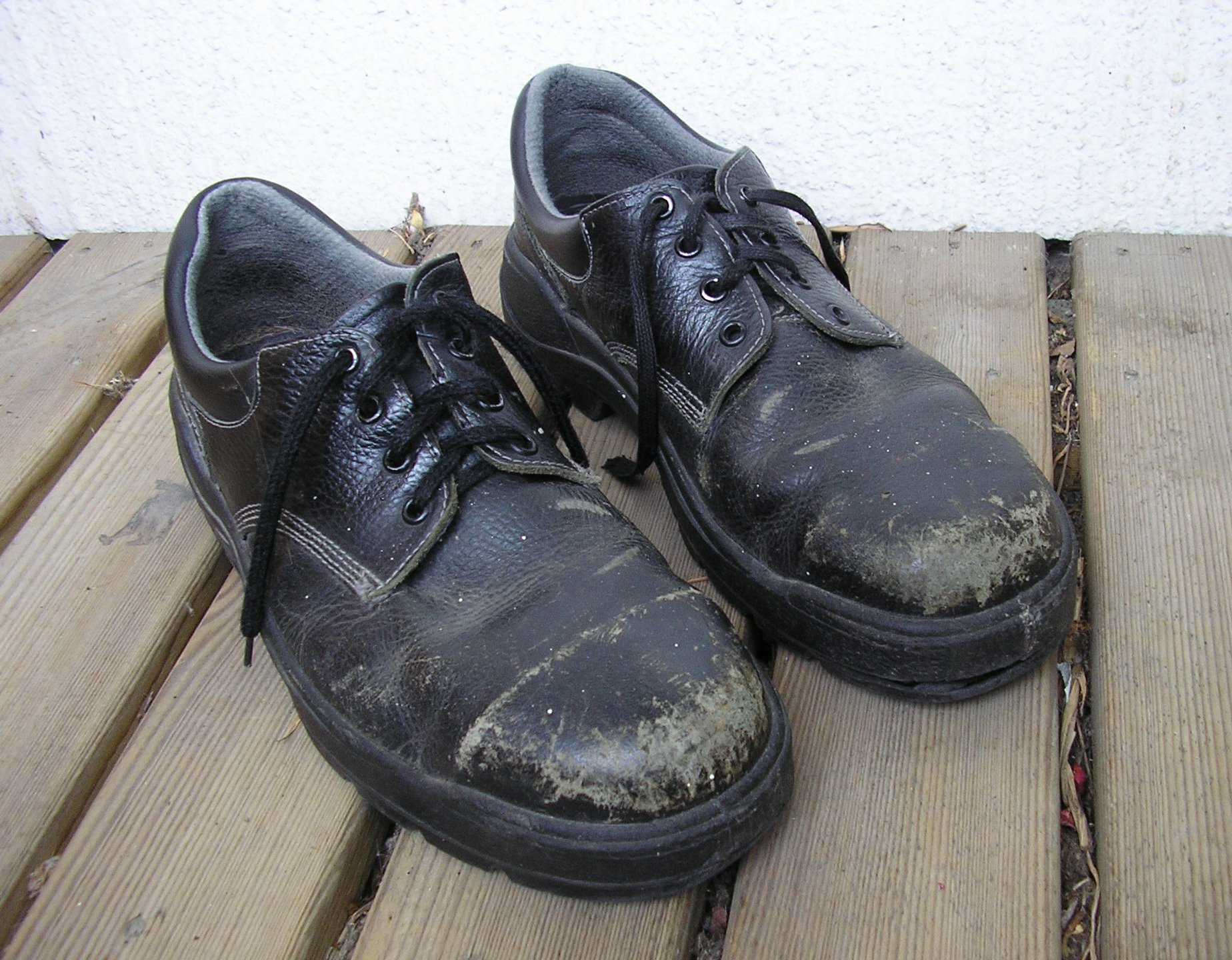
A pair of well-worn steel-toe shoes

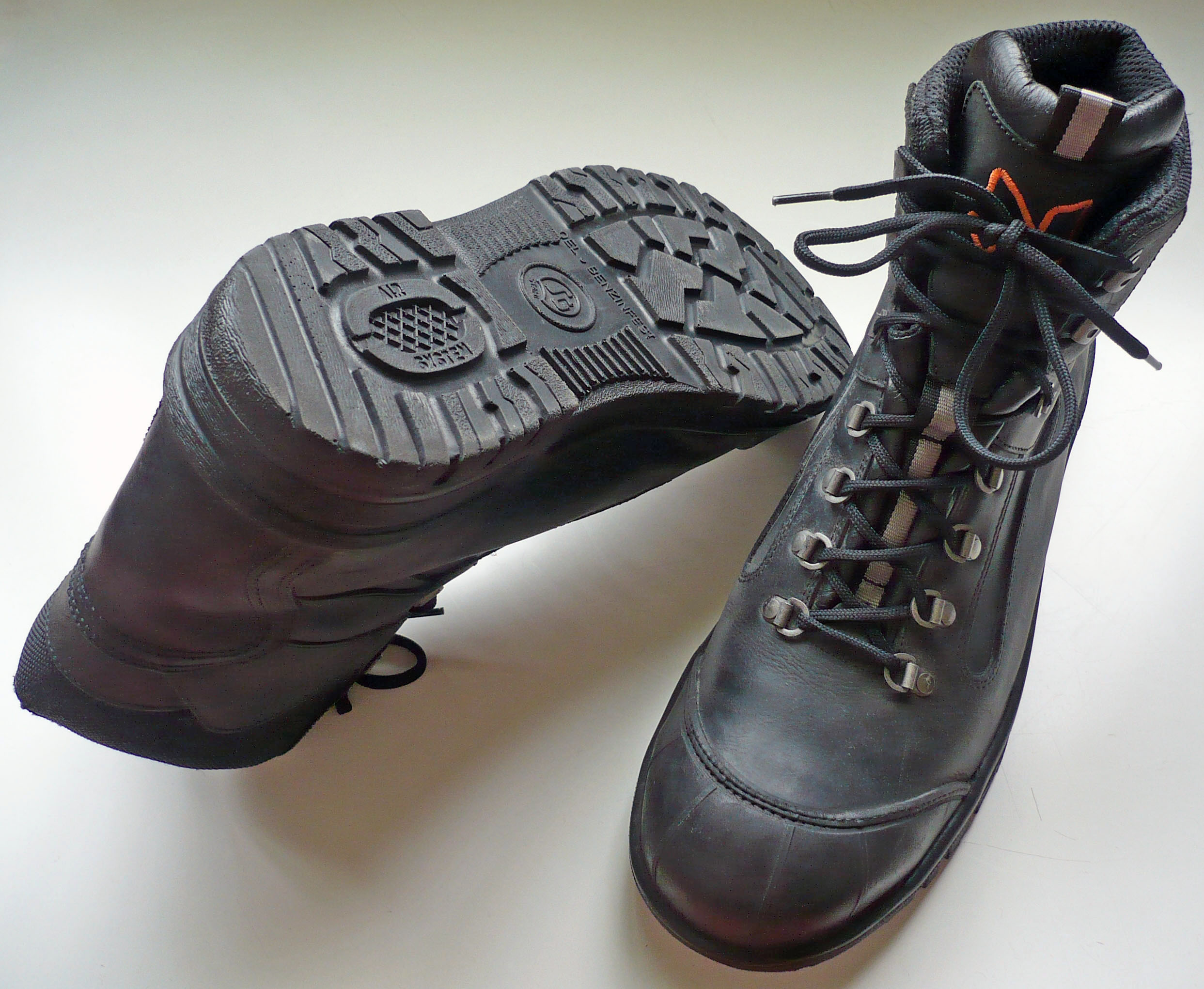
A pair of ISO 20345:2004 compliant S3 safety boots

A steel-toe boot (also known as a safety boot, steel-capped boot, steel toecaps or safety shoe) is a durable boot or shoe that has a protective reinforcement in the toe which protects the foot from falling objects or compression. Safety shoes are effective in keeping the feet of industrial workers safe from sharp and heavy objects while working in factories.

Safety footwear now comes in many styles, including sneakers, clogs, and dress shoes. Some are quite formal, for supervising engineers who must visit sites where protective footwear is mandatory.

Some brands of steel-toe footwear have become fashionable within subcultures such as skinhead, punk, and rivethead. While brands that were previously renowned within the fashion industry have also diversified into the safety footwear market, industrial brands like Caterpillar, Rock Fall and JCB have also issued licenses to produce safety footwear.

== History ==
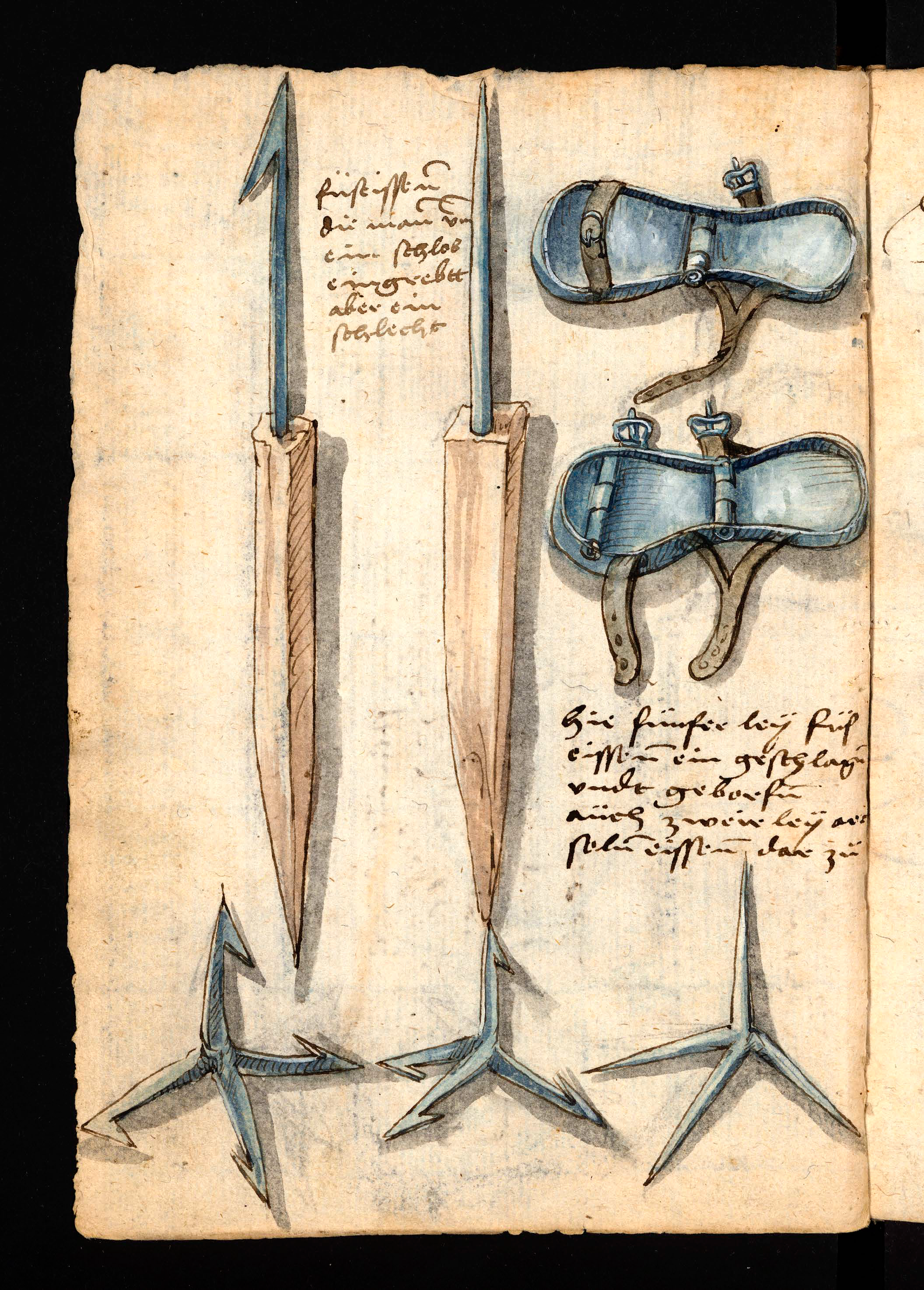
Iron soles as protective footwear against caltrops, Löffelholz codex (1505)

An early approach to safety shoes is the suggestion of several late medieval authors of military manuals - such as Konrad Kyeser (1366–1405) in his bellifortis, suggesting iron soles for protection against foot traps and caltrops in their manuscripts.

== Safety boot ==
Safety boots are used by tradespeople to protect from environmental hazards at a jobsite. They may also be used for outdoor recreational activities or sports such as off-roading, overlanding or woodchopping. Common protections include steel/reinforced toe, metatarsal guard, penetration-resistant (steel plate in mid-sole), electrical hazard (EH), chemical resistance and waterproofing. Modern safety boots are usually laced with a vertical side zipper under a hook-and-loop strap. Chainsaw boots resist cutting, foundry boots resist high temperatures and molten metal, SR (slip resistant) boots resist slips and falls.

=== Safety criteria ===
==== Asia ====
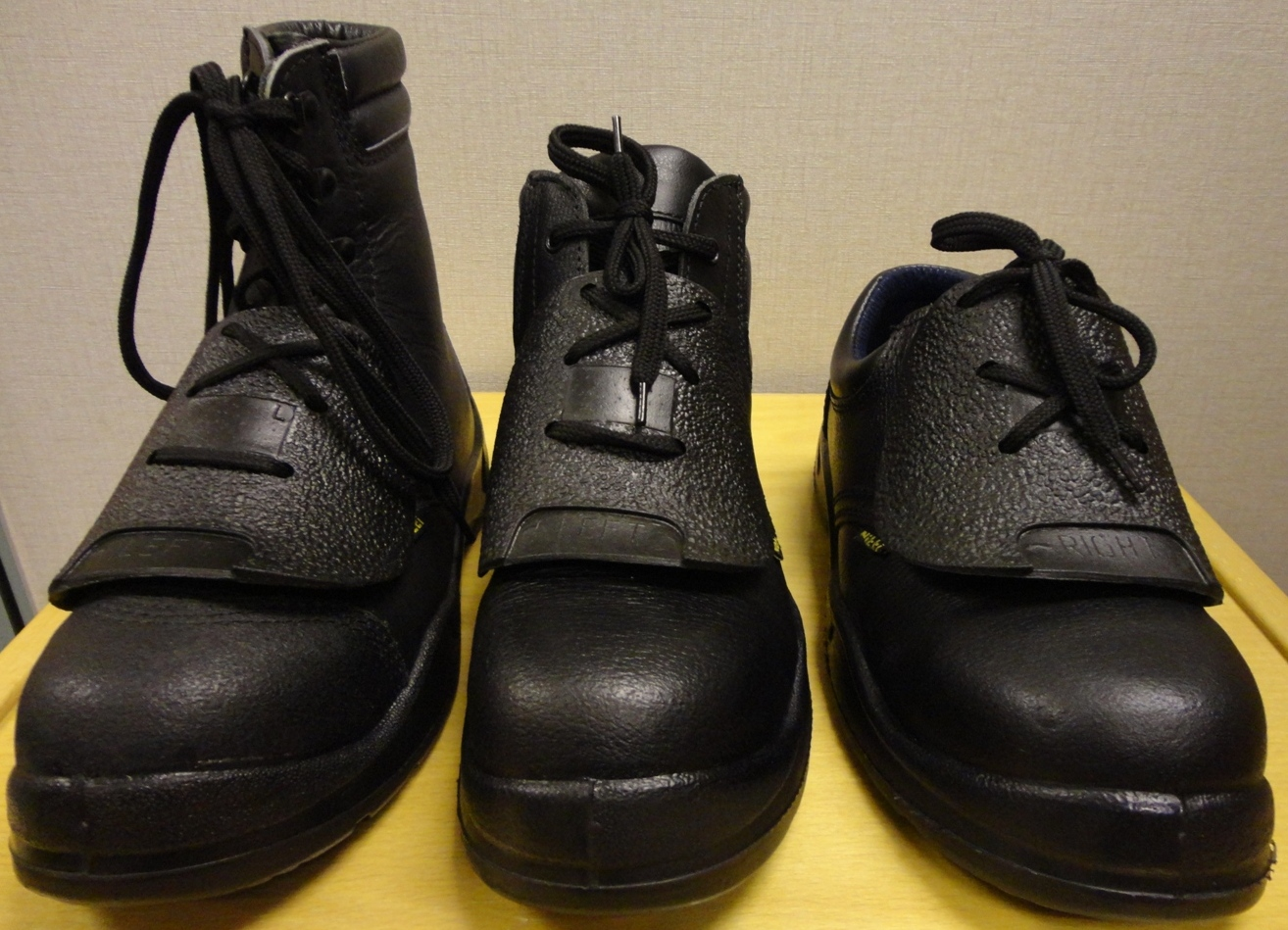
Safety shoes with removable polymer metatarsal guards

Safety shoe standards in Asia are:

- China: GB 21148 & An1, An2, An3, An4, An5
- Indonesia: SNI 0111:2009
- Japan: JIS T8101
- Malaysia: SIRIM MA 1598:1998
- Singapore: SS 513-1:2005
- India: IS 15298-I: 2011 test methods, IS 15298–II for safety footwear, IS 15298-III Protective footwear, IS 15298-IV Occupational Footwear
- Thailand: TIS 523-2011

==== Europe ====
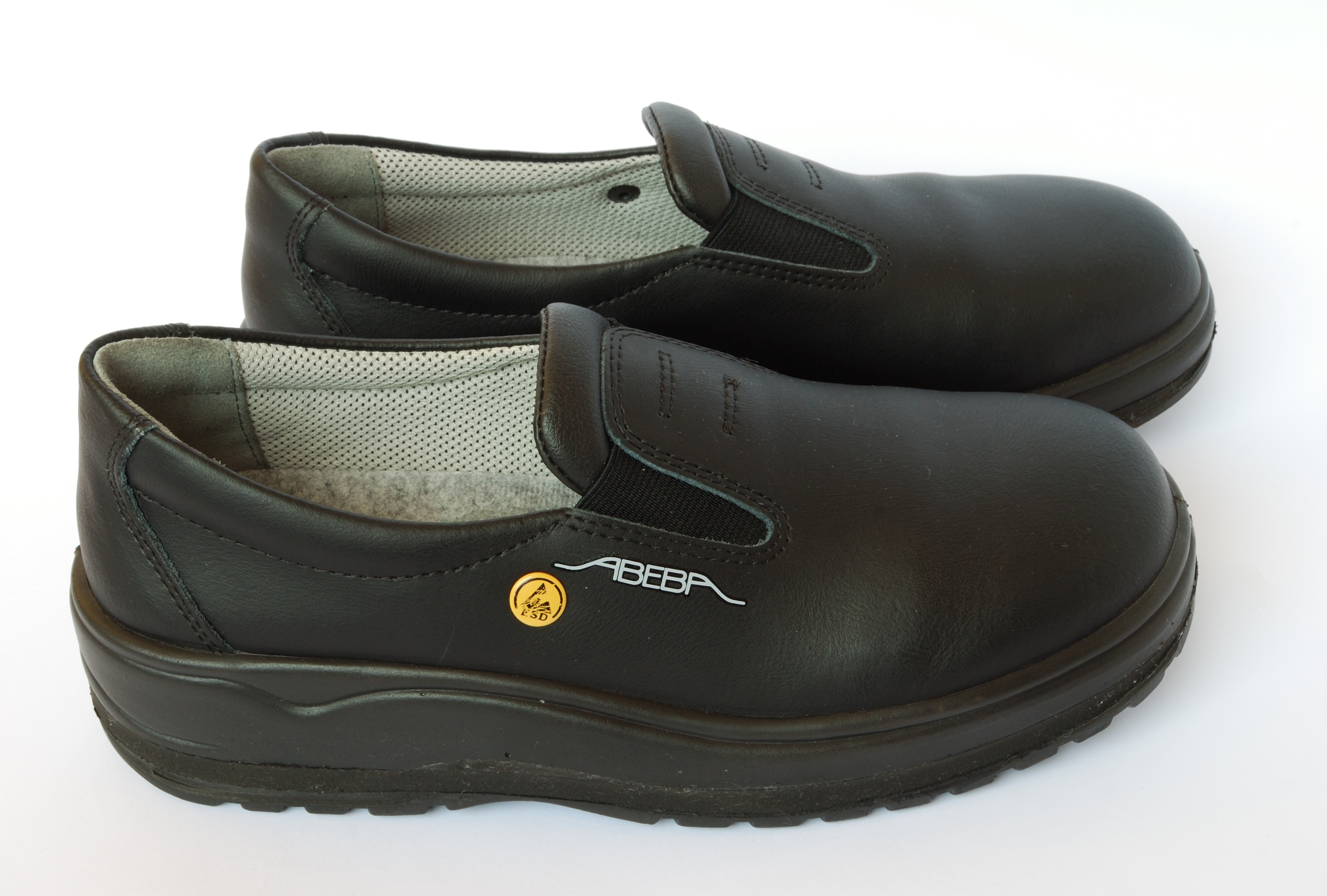
A pair of ISO 20345:2004 compliant anti-static shoes

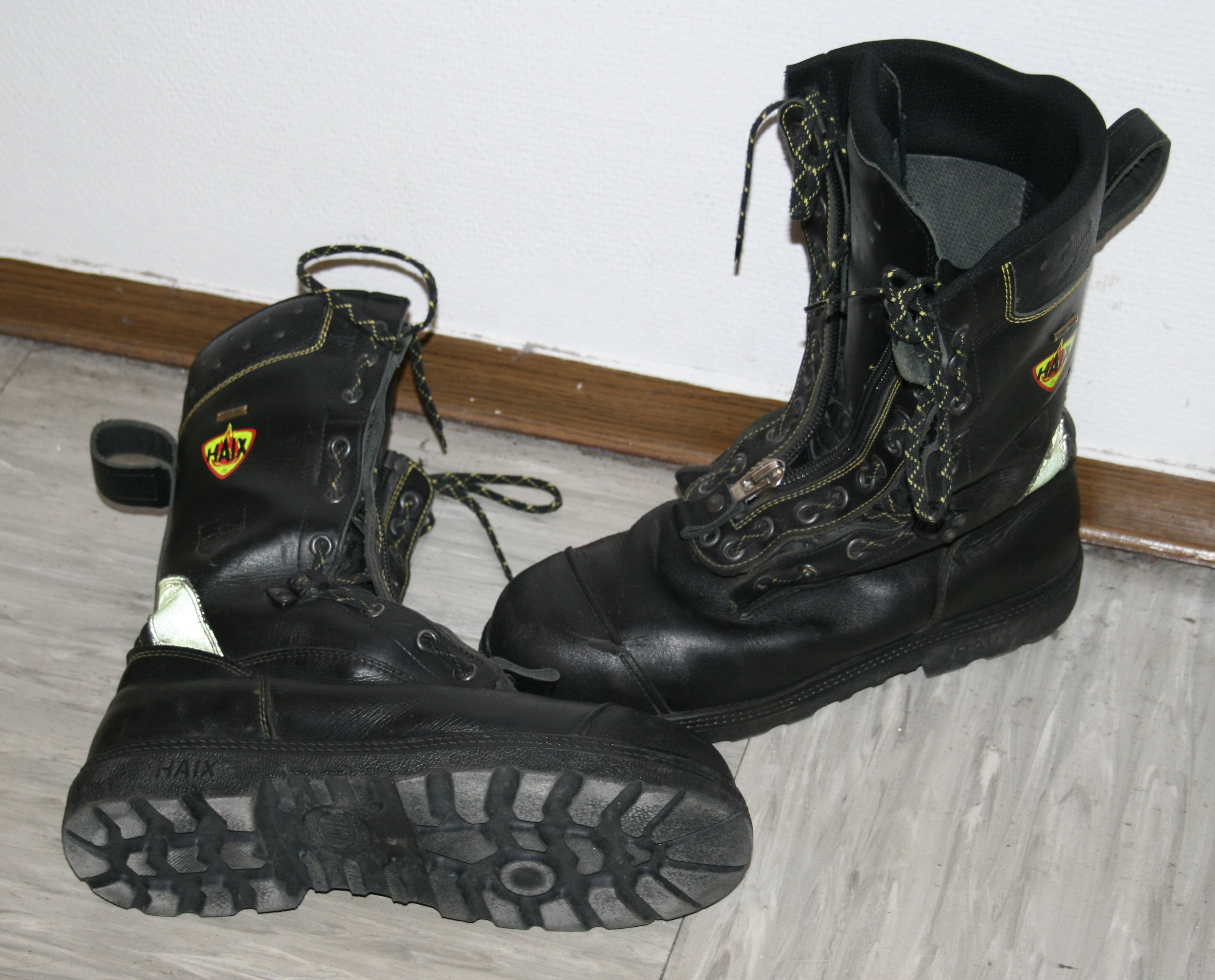
A pair of ISO 20345:2004 compliant S3 HRO HI CI FPA safety boots for firefighters featuring a laced in quickzip boot closure

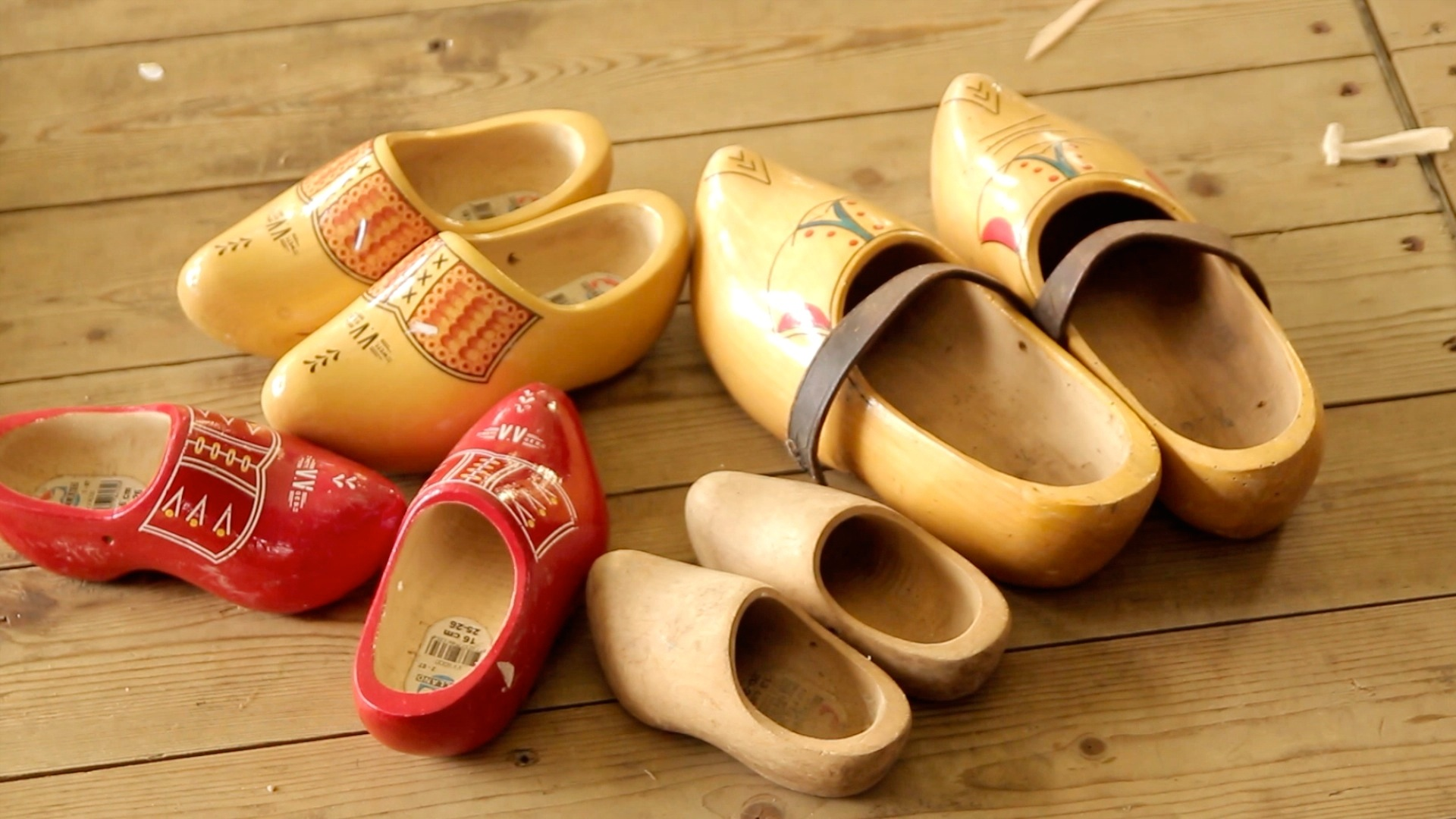
Several types of traditional Dutch whole feet clogs are ISO 20345:2004 compliant S3 safety shoes.

The International Organization for Standardization provides the European standard for safety footwear. The current one is ISO 20345:2011 - previously ISO 20345:2004.

The codes applicable to European safety footwear are:

| Protected area | Type of protection | Code |
|---|---|---|
| Steel toe | Basic Impact 200 joules including compression 15,000 newtons | SB |
| Steel toe | 200 joule toecap protection. Closed seat region (fully enclosed heel). Antistatic properties. Energy absorption of seat region. Fuel resistance. | S1 |
| Steel toe | 200 joule toecap protection. Closed seat region (fully enclosed heel). Antistatic properties. Energy absorption of seat region. Fuel resistance. Water penetration and water absorption resistance. | S2 |
| Steel toe | 200 joule toecap protection. Closed seat region (fully enclosed heel). Antistatic properties. Energy absorption of seat region. Fuel resistance. Water penetration and water absorption resistance. Sole penetration resistance. Cleated outsole. | S3 |
| Additional protections | Heat-Resistant Outsole: shoe sole resistance to hot contact up to 300 °C for 1 minute | HRO |
| Additional protections | Penetration resistance offered by a steel midsole: 1100 newtons | P |
| Additional protections | Heel energy absorption: 20 joules | E |
| Additional protections | Water penetration-resistant uppers | WRU |
| Additional protections | Whole shoe waterproof | WR |
| Additional protections | Metatarsal protection | M |
| Additional protections | Ankle protection | AN |
| Electrical resistance | Conductive: Maximum resistance 100 kΩ | O |
| Electrical resistance | Antistatic: Range of 100 kΩ to 1000 MΩ | A |
| Hostile environments | Cold Insulated: shoe insulated against cold to -17 °C for 30 minutes | CI |
| Hostile environments | Heat Insulated: shoe insulated against heat up to 150 °C for 30 minutes | HI |
| Hostile environments | Skid resistance on ceramic tile floors with sodium lauryl sulfate solution cleaning agent | SRA |
| Hostile environments | Skid resistance on steel floors with glycerine | SRB |
| Hostile environments | Skid resistance on ceramic tile floors with cleaning agent and steel floors with glycerine | SRC |
| Hostile environments | Fuel resistance (oil and gasoline/petrol) | FO |
| Hostile environments | Cut resistance (not against chainsaw cuts) | CR |

There is also Previous EN ISO 20346:2004 and Now the latest one is EN ISO 20346:2021 for protective footwear (must comply to basic safety requirements but toe cap impact resistance requirement is lower - 100 Joules) & EN ISO 20347:2004 for Occupational Footwear (must comply to basic safety requirements with antistatic or slip-resistant properties. This standard does not require a protective toe cap)

==== North America ====
===== Canada =====
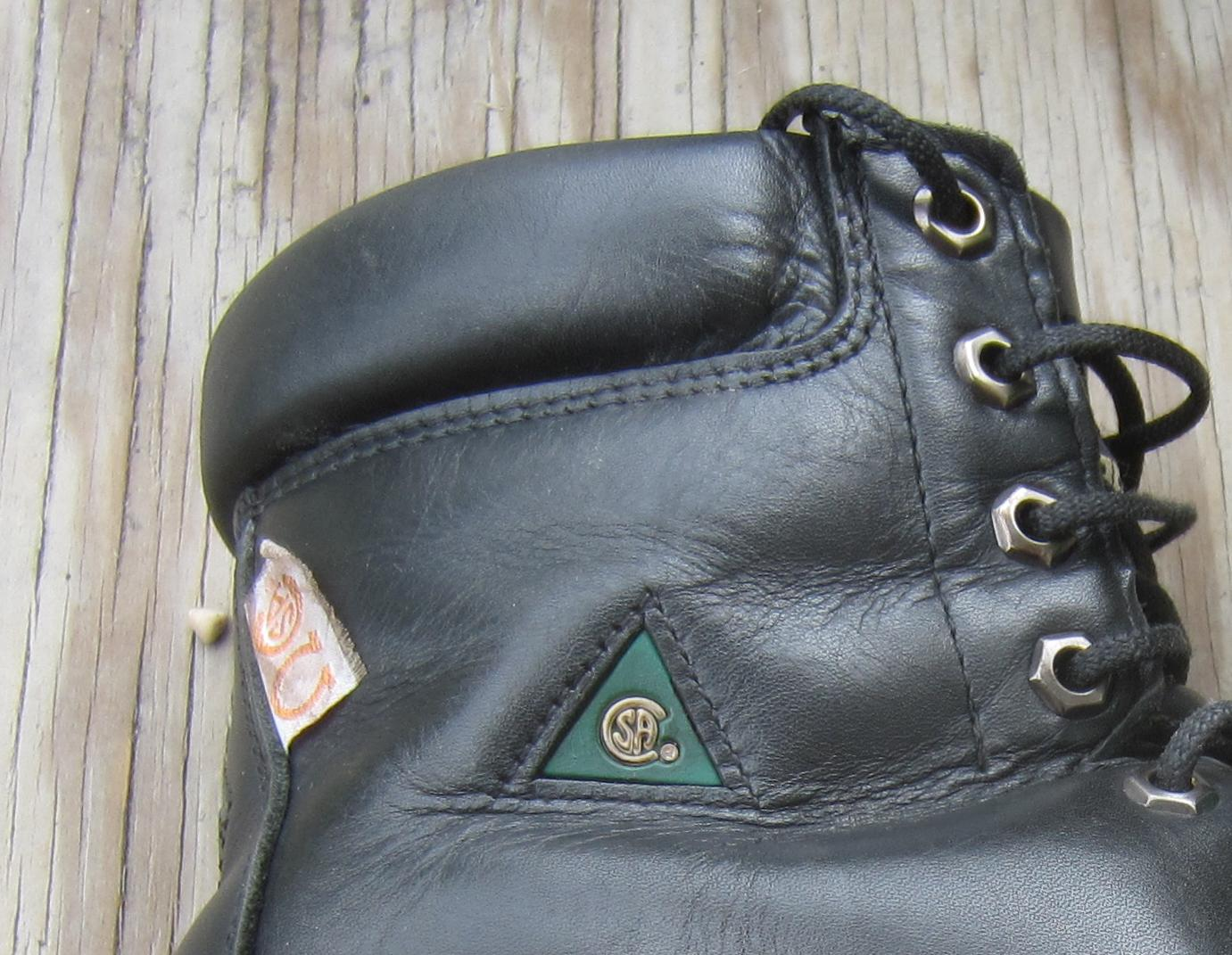
(CSA) green triangle and orange electrical safety tags

In Canada, the most common standards used by employers are those of the CSA Group (formerly the Canadian Standards Association; CSA), published in CSA standard Z195. These standards are similar to the ASTM International standards commonly used in the United States but the testing methods do vary.

CSA standards on shoe labels feature distinct shapes and colors, represents specific safety criteria for all safety footwear and apparel:

- Green triangle with registered symbol - Sole puncture protection with a Grade 1 protective toe. (Heavy work environment: construction; machine shops; where sharp objects are present)
- Yellow triangle with registered symbol - Sole puncture protection with a Grade 2 protective toe. (Light industrial work environments)
- White rectangle with orange Greek letter omega and registered symbol - Soles that provide electric shock resistance, with Ω (capital omega) being the symbol for ohms of electrical resistance. (Any industrial environment where live electrical conductors can occur)
- Yellow rectangle with green letters "SD", a grounding symbol and registered symbol - Capable of dissipating an electrostatic charge in a controlled manner. (Any industrial environment where a static discharge can be a hazard for workers or equipment)
- Red rectangle with a black letter C, grounding symbol and registered symbol - Soles that are electrically conductive. (Any industrial environment where low-power electrical charges can be a hazard for workers or equipment)
- White label with green fir tree symbol and registered symbol - Provides protection when using chainsaws. (Forestry workers and others required to use a chainsaw)
- Blue Square with registered symbol - Grade 1 protective toe only. (For all other environments not listed above)

The registered symbol in each of the CSA Z195 protective footwear markings is a registered identifying logo or mark of the certifying agency. Examples of organizations that certify footwear to this standard include the Safety Equipment Institute (SEI), the CSA Group, and UL Solutions.

Generally, a safety shoe is a shoe that follows at least one of five criteria. The criteria that a safety shoe adheres to can be found by looking for the CSA (Canadian Standards Association) alphanumeric code found inside the shoe. This code is made up of a combination of 5 different symbols:

- 1, 2 or 0;
- P or 0;
- M or 0;
- E, S or C;
- X or 0.
1. The first code indicates whether the shoe has a steel-toe cap (a metal shell embedded on top of the toes part of the shoe). "0" means there is none. "1" means that there is, and it resists an impact of 125 joules (22.7kg object falling from 56cm above). "2" means that it resists an impact of 90 joules.
2. The second code indicates whether the shoe has soles that protect the arches of the feet from punctures. "P" means it does. "O" means it doesn't.
3. The third code indicates whether the shoe has a metatarsus protection against shocks and collisions. "M" means it does. "O" doesn't.
4. The fourth code indicates the shoe's electrical properties. "E" means it resists electrical shocks. "S" means it disperses static electrical. "C" means it conducts electricity.
5. This last code is found only on shoes that protect the foot from chainsaws, i.e. chainsaw boots. "X" it does, "O" does not.

===== United States =====
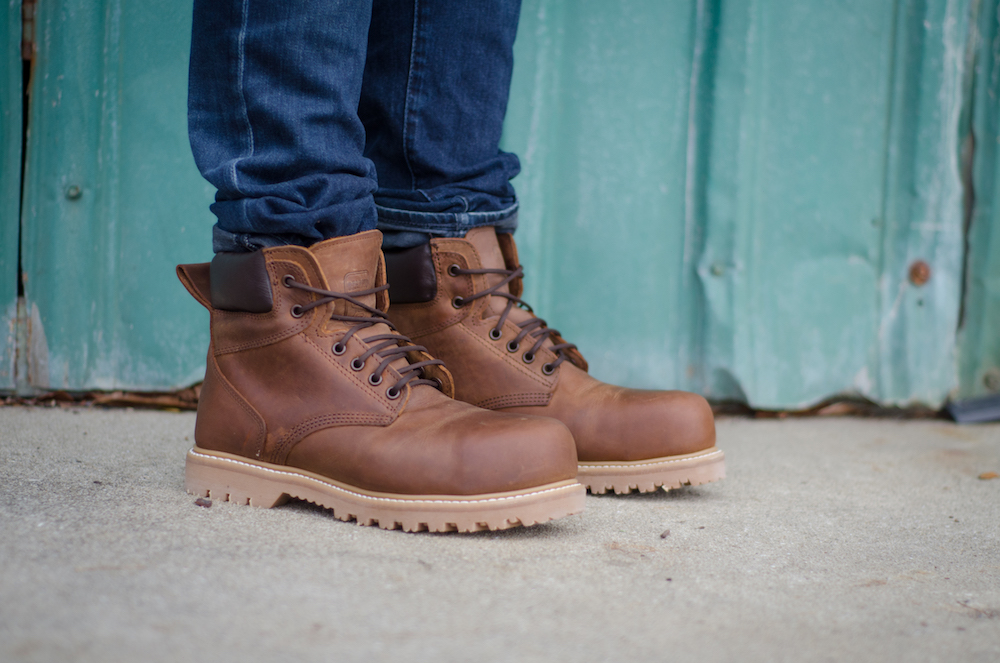
A pair of ASTM 2412-2413 compliant S3 safety shoes

In the United States, the most common standards used by employers for protective footwear are ASTM International standards F2412-18a (Standard Test Methods for Foot Protection) and ASTM F2413-18 (Standard Specification for Performance Requirements for Foot Protection).

OSHA previously required compliance of ANSI Z41.1-1991, "American National Standard for Personal Protection-Protective Footwear," if purchased after July 5, 1994, or ANSI standard "USA Standard for Men's Safety-Toe Footwear," Z41.1-1967, if purchased before that date.

As of March 1, 2005, ANSI Z41 has been replaced by ASTM F2412 and ASTM F2413.

ASTM certified footwear must include a label that indicates which safety standards that particular footwear meets. The various safety standards include:

- I - Impact
- C - Compression
- Mt - Metatarsal
- Cd - Conductive
- EH - Electrical Hazard
- SD - Static Dissipating
- PR - Puncture Resistant

==== Oceania ====
- Australia: AS 2210.3:2019
- New Zealand: NZS 2210.3:2009 [sic]

== See also ==
- List of boots
- List of shoe styles
- Chainsaw safety clothing
- Personal protective equipment
- Combat boot
- Rigger boot
- Safety engineering
- Toe box
