= Chap boot =

Type of footwear

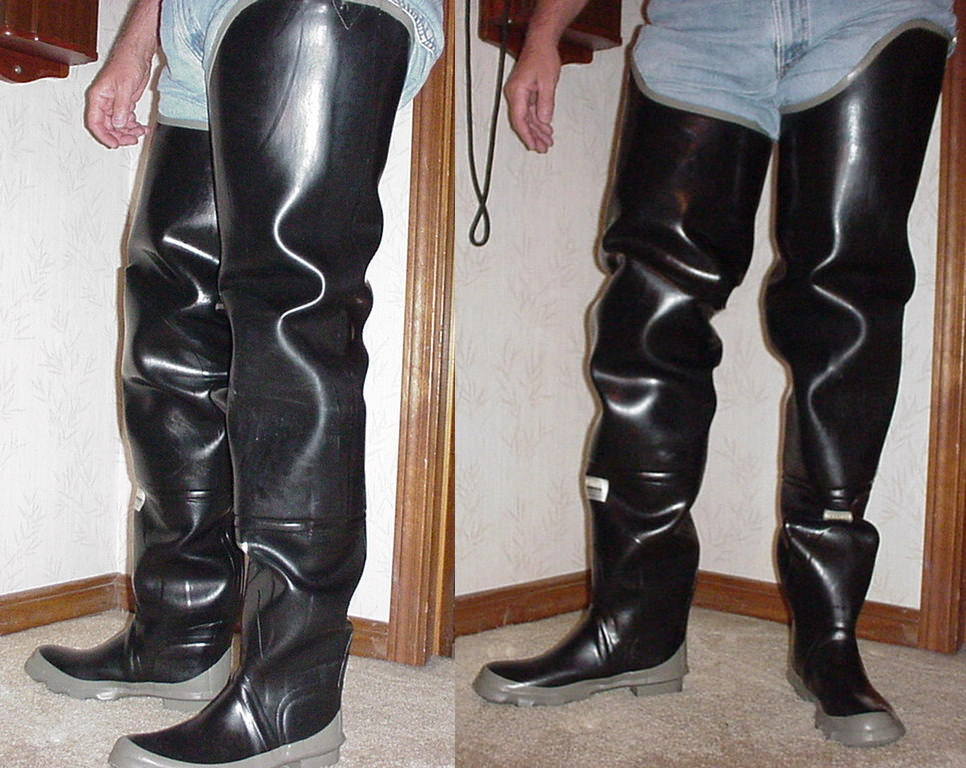

Chap boots are a form of footwear. They are tall boots which cover the whole leg up to the crotch, with a strap attached to the outer side. These straps consist of a loop of material through which a belt is threaded to hold the boots up. Thus the boots act similarly to a pair of chaps. Such boots are often seen as part of boot fetishism.

== See also ==
- List of boots
- List of shoe styles
- Chaps
