= Waders (footwear) =

Waterproof footwear or garment used for walking in water

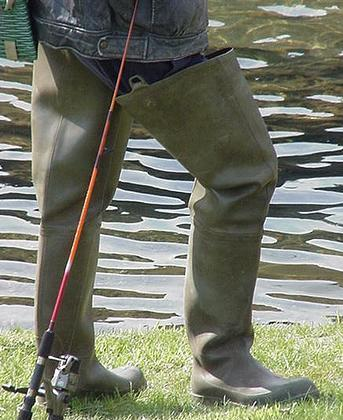
Thigh-length boot foot waders

Waders denotes a waterproof boot or overalls extending from the foot to the thigh, the chest or even the neck. They are traditionally made from vulcanised rubber, but available in more modern PVC, neoprene and Gore-Tex variants. Waders are generally distinguished from counterpart waterproof boots by shaft height; the hip boot extending to the thigh and the Wellington boot to the knee. For the sake of emphasis, therefore, waders are sometimes defined by the extent of their coverage as thigh waders, chest waders or full-body waders. As a drysuit variant, full-body waders come with leaktight cuffs or gloves fitted to the sleeves and with a leaktight collar or hood fitted to the neck, enabling the wearer to remain dry when standing or walking in deeper water. Waders are available with boots attached or can have attached stocking feet (usually made of the wader material), to wear inside boots, or inside swimfins in the case of float tube fishing.

== Origin ==
The first manufactured waders were made as early as the 1850s by a company called Hodgman. When rubber became popular around 1912, they started making the waders out of this particularly waterproof and durable material. Then rubber was more or less perfected in 1942 for World War II, so they used the same technology to make waders that are closer to what we have today.

== Types ==
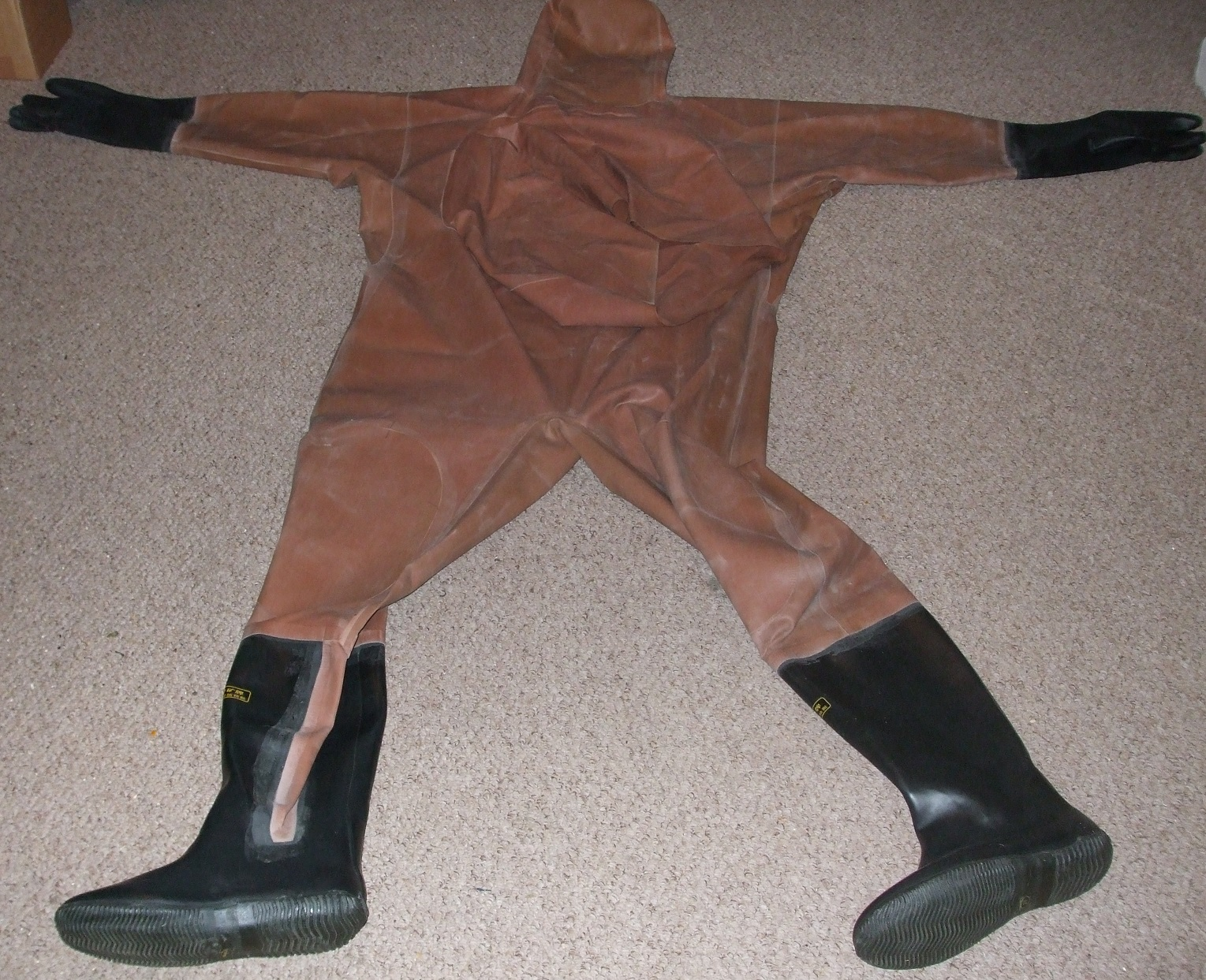
Chinese-made full-body chest-entry wading suit with attached boots, gloves and hood with uncut facepiece.

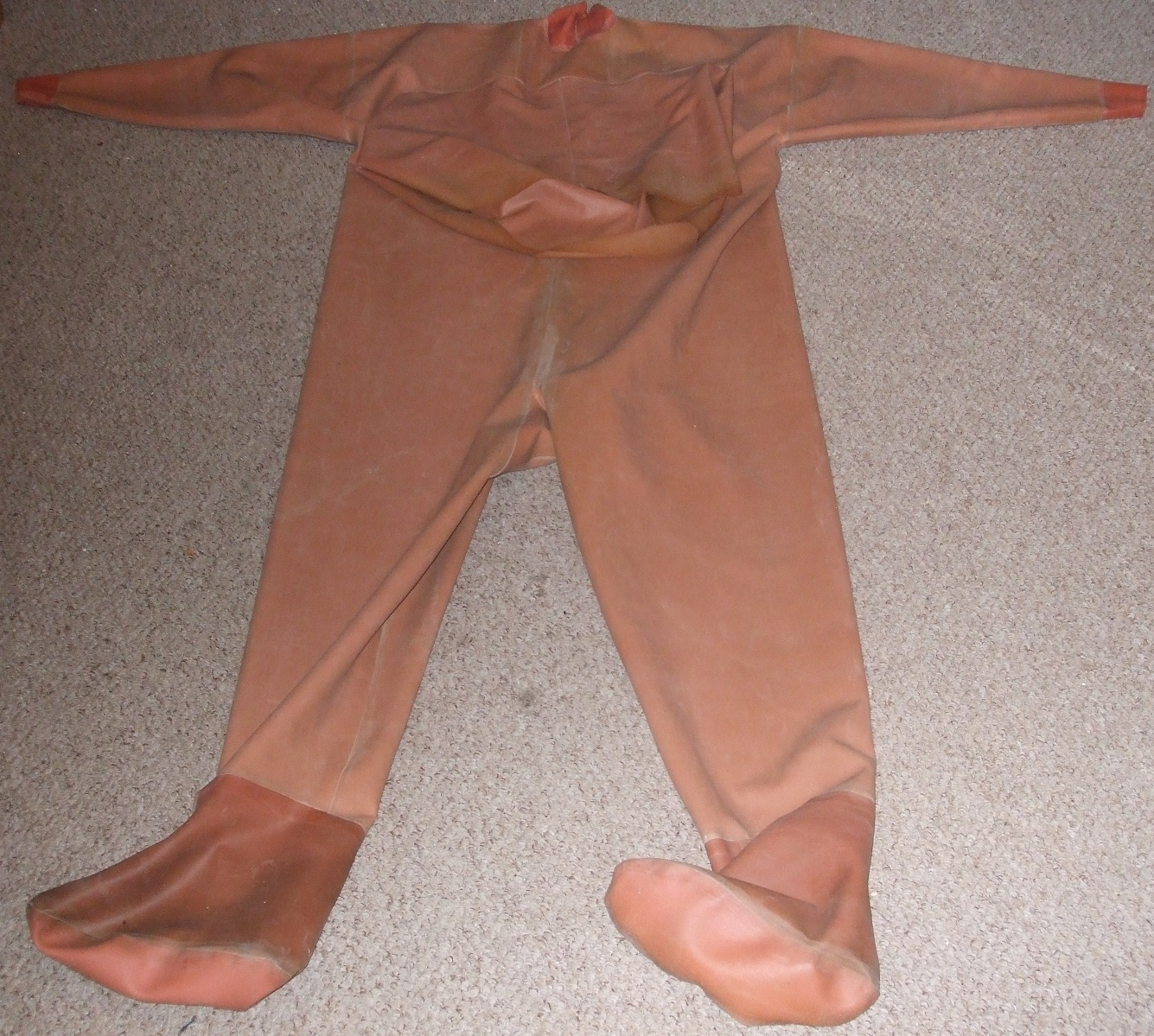
Chinese-made full-body chest-entry wading suit with attached socks, wristseals and neckseal.

There are two main types of waders: stocking-foot and boot-foot. Stocking-foot is separate from the boot and connects to it, while boot-foot includes the boot already.

== Uses ==
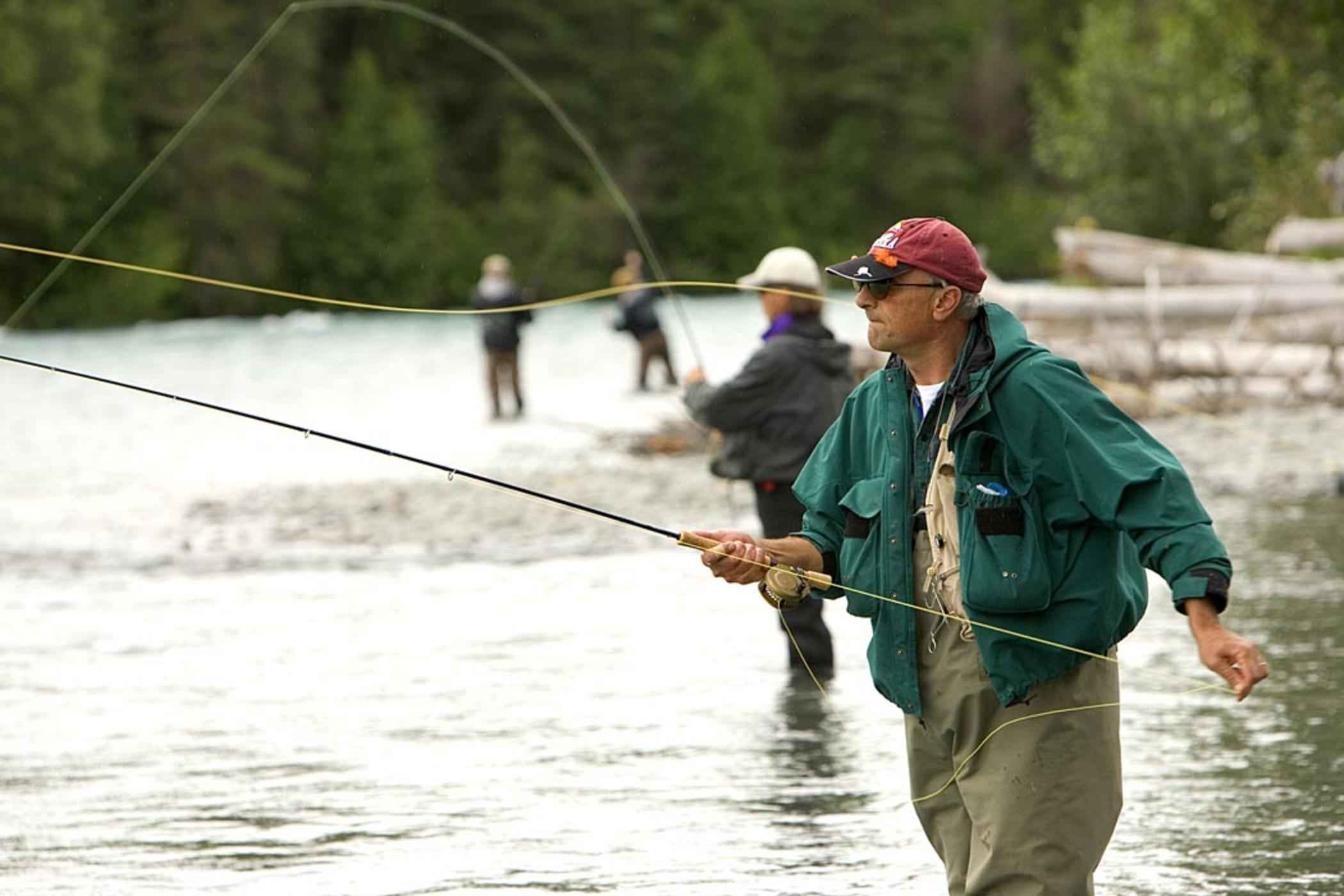
Fly fishermen using chest waders to stay dry.

Waders have a wide range of applications. For leisure purposes, they are worn while angling, water gardening, playing with model boats, waterfowl hunting, and off-road riding of all-terrain vehicles. In the world of work, heavy-duty waders are used predominantly in the chemical industry, agriculture, aquaculture and in the maintenance of water supply, sewerage and other utilities. Waders are frequently worn by pastors during full-immersion baptism and they have an important application during flooding, when walking outdoors or indoors.

Trench foot is common in those who spend a lot of time in the water without proper protection. People like fly fishermen use waders because they stay in the water for hours on end, and they need the proper protection.

Depending on the kind of fish that the fisherman is catching, they might not need waders. Some fish are best caught on land. But some fish are best caught when the fisherman is chest deep in the water. Waders are also essential for keeping warm during colder months, because they keep the cold water off the skin, which otherwise could cause hypothermia or other problems.

== Environmental impact ==
Many states in the US are beginning to ban certain types of waders, specifically those with porous felt soles. These kinds of soles easily host various types of invasive species that could be carried from one water source to another. The invasive organisms and plants pose a threat to fish stocks and important fish habitats. For example, effective March 1, 2012, most counties in Missouri ban these kinds of waders while sport fishing in fresh water. And in all of Alaska, as of January 1, 2012, the same law applies. In New Zealand, the use of felt-soled waders and boots for sports fishing was banned in 2008 as part of the containment measures put in place following the discovery of the invasive alga, didymo, in South Island rivers in 2004.

== See also ==
- List of boots
- List of shoe styles
