= Riding boot =

Boot made to be used for horse riding

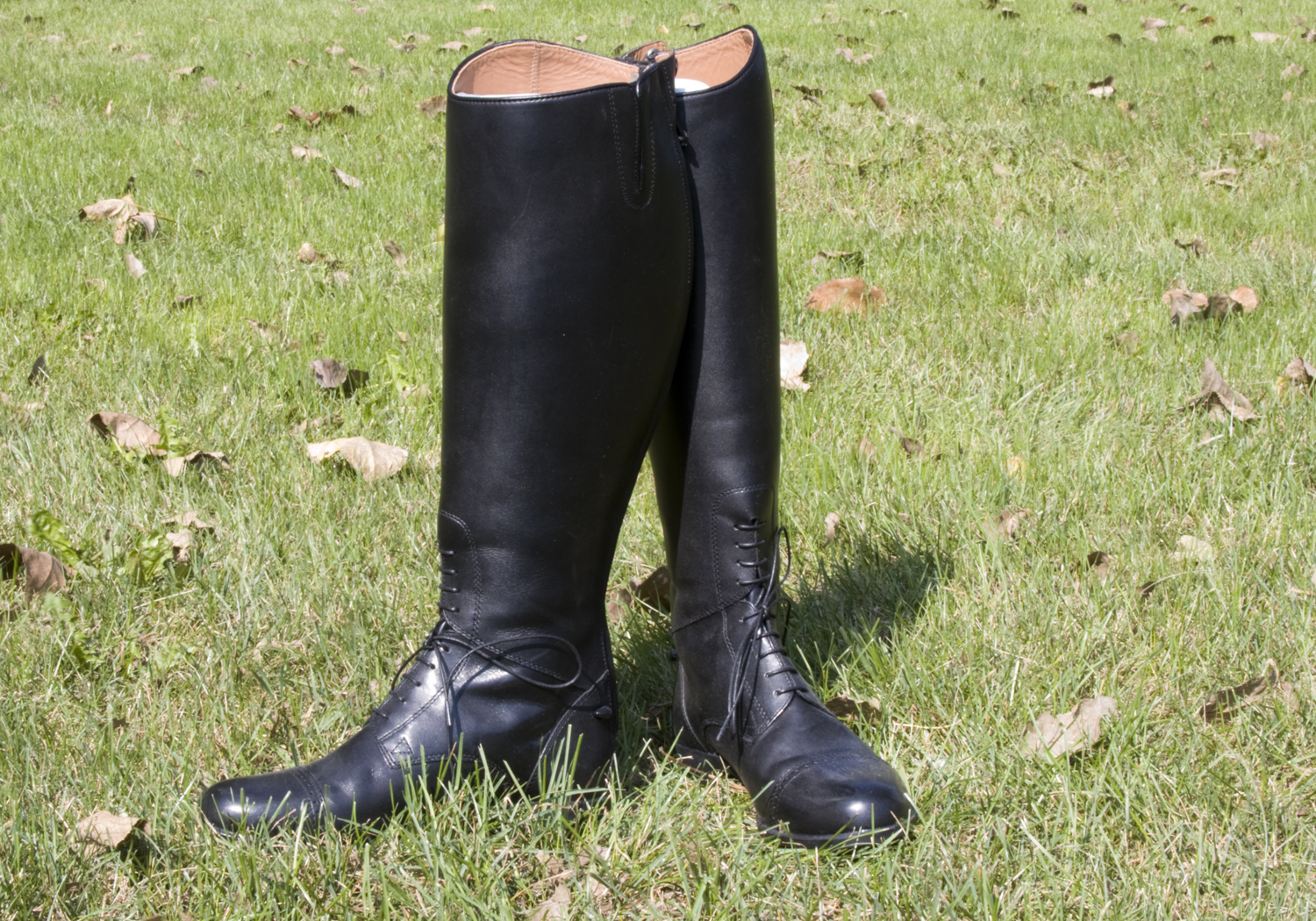
Black English riding field boots

A riding boot is a boot made to be used for horse riding. The classic boot comes high enough up the leg to prevent the leathers of the saddle from pinching the leg of the rider, has a sturdy toe to protect the rider's foot when on the ground and has a distinct heel to prevent the foot from sliding through the stirrup. The sole is smooth or lightly textured to avoid being caught on the tread of the stirrup in the event of a fall.

The modern riding boot is relatively low-heeled, with a heel of less than one inch, though historically a higher heel was common, as it has always been critically important for riding boots to prevent the foot from slipping through the stirrup. Today, only some styles of cowboy boot retain a higher heel than other modern riding boots.

== English riding designs ==
For the riding disciplines that fall into the category of English riding, there are a number of different styles of riding boots, intended for different styles of riding, from horse shows, to pleasure riding. Tall boots, which end just below the knee of the rider, include field, dress, and hunt boots. These are standard show apparel, worn by all competitors in the hunter/jumper and dressage disciplines. A lower paddock boot that stops just above the ankle, is worn by children, by some show competitors in the UK, Australia, and by those that show saddle seat.

Field boots: so called because they were traditionally worn by officers ranked "field grade" or higher, have lacing at the vamp, which allows for some give so the rider is more comfortable riding with the highly flexed ankle that develops from the shorter stirrup length required for work over fences. Therefore, field boots are preferred in all jumping disciplines, including Hunt seat equitation, show jumping, fox hunting, and both jumping phases in eventing. They are also worn by police officers riding motorcycles or on mounted patrols, and by some police agencies as part of their "Class A" uniform or with ceremonial mounted units. The majority of field boots are black, although brown-colored boots may also be purchased.

Dress boots: do not have lacing at the ankle, and are generally stiffer. They are worn by dressage riders, eventers in the dressage phase, and at formal fox hunts. They are also worn by riders of show jumpers. Dress boots are traditionally black in color. A recent fad is dress boots for dressage that are cut to go extra high on the outside of the knee.

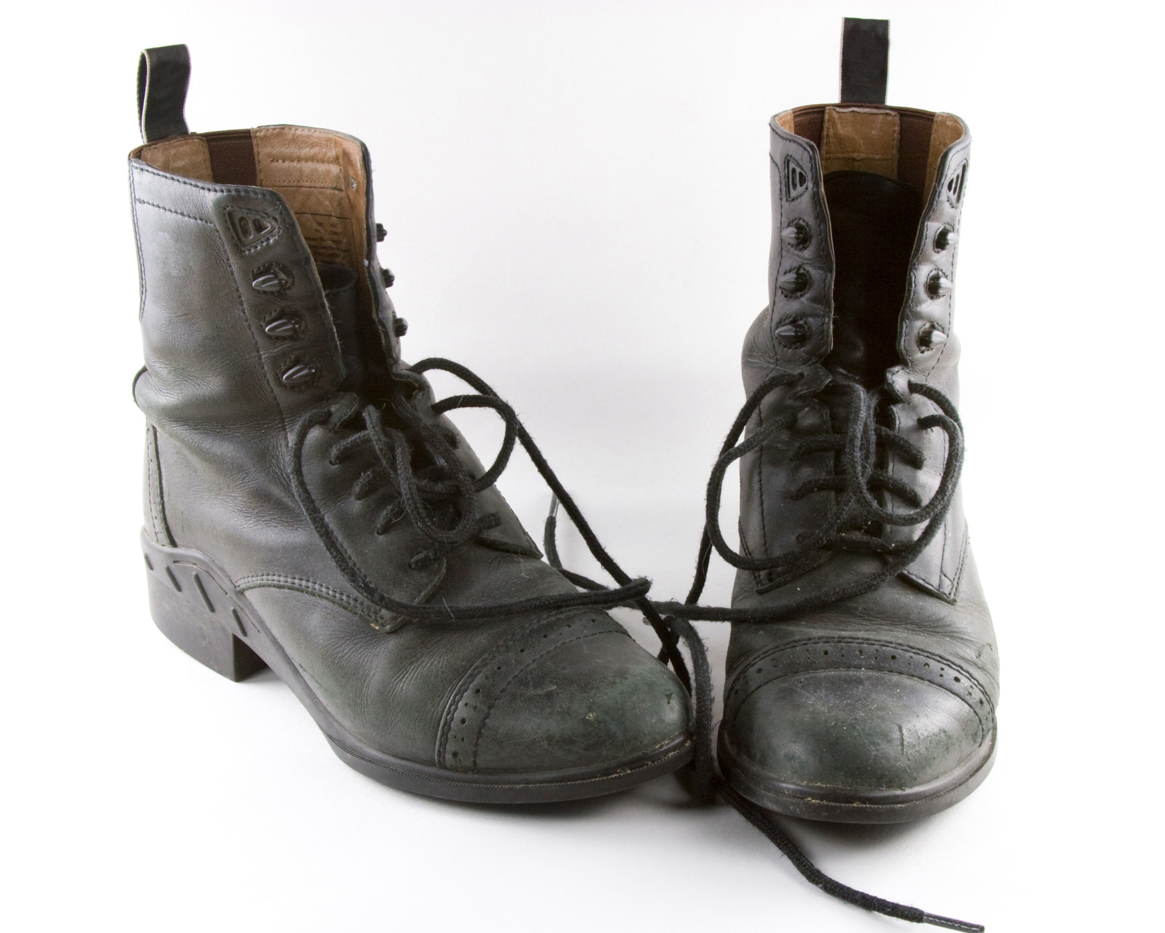
Paddock style black leather boots, well worn

Hunt boots, or Top boots: like the dress boot, except it has a "cuff" at the top. The boot is usually black, with a tan cuff (traditional for male riders). It is appropriate for fox hunting.

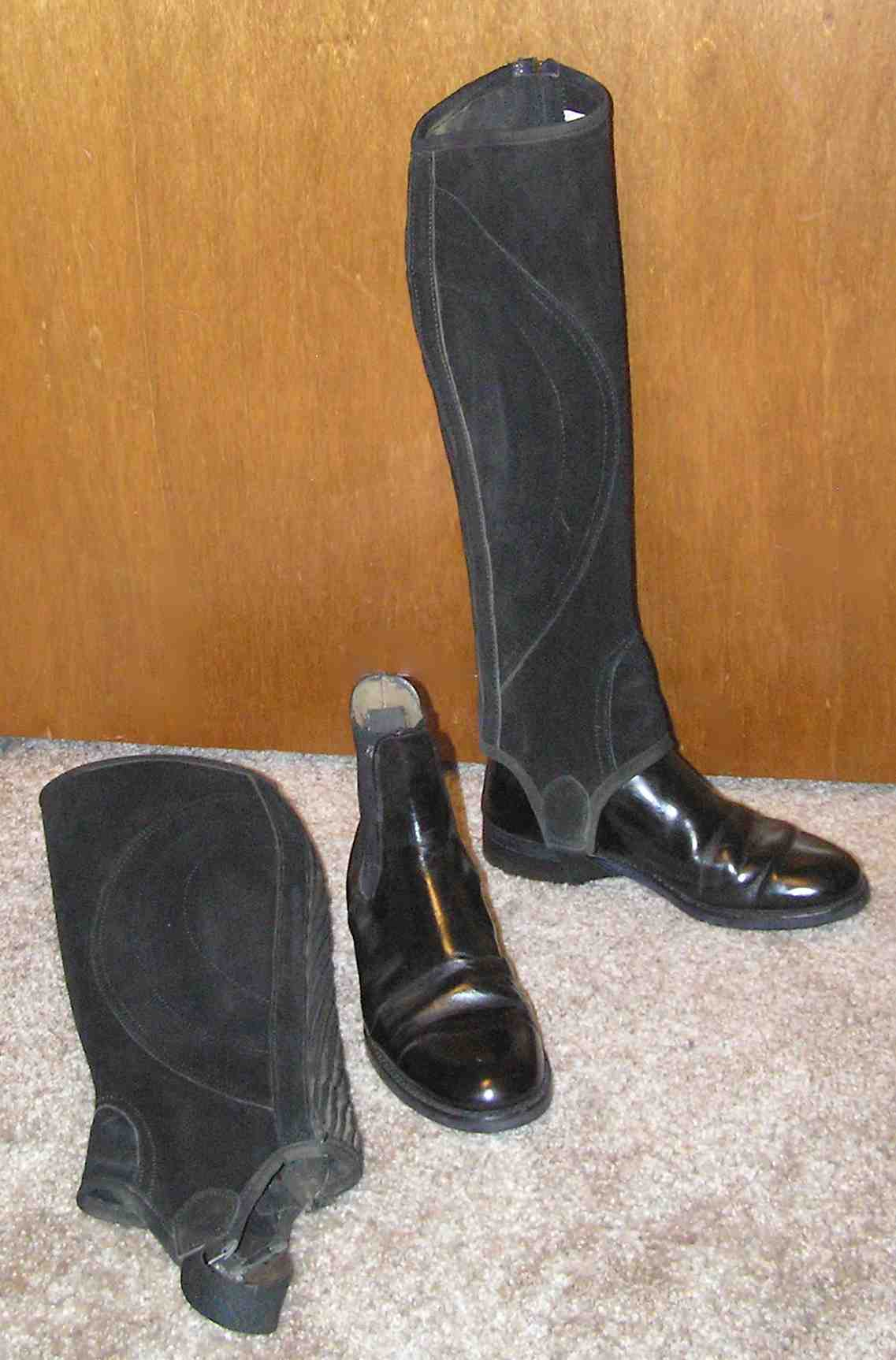
Half chaps worn over paddock boots duplicate the protection and visual line of a tall boot

Paddock boots, also known as Jodhpur boots, are short boots that come just above the ankle, used most often for pleasure riding and everyday use. They are also required for Saddle seat style riding and are frequently worn by children when showing in hunt seat disciplines because they are less costly for rapidly growing children than are tall boots. They are sometimes combined with half chaps, a type of gaiter also known as chapettes, for added protection or to give the visual impression of a tall boot. The lace-up style is primarily seen in hunt seat riding, whereas the elastic-sided Chelsea boot design is seen in both hunt seat and saddle seat disciplines. The elastic side boot is also commonly used in Australia as a riding boot and dress boot. They are part of the required attire in Australian Stock Horse turnout competitions and for Pony Club riding. Heavier versions, such as Blundstone boots, are made for general work and gardening but are not suitable for riding owing to their heavy, deep-grooved soles.

Field boots (and many paddock boots) have an extra layer of leather on the toe, called a toe cap. All styles have somewhat tapered, round toes. Current styles include zip-on boots, with a zipper running down the back of the calf of a tall boot or the front of a paddock boot, making them easier to put on and remove without aid of boot hooks or a boot jack.

Brown tall boots (field or dress) were somewhat more common before World War II, when the English riding habit lost popularity outside of formal and/or horse show events. The U.S. Army, whose officers had worn high brown boots in World War I, abandoned the practice by the late 1930s. For a time, some show sanctioning organizations did not allow brown boots, considering them to be casual attire, although the rule has been relaxed somewhat.

== Cowboy boots ==
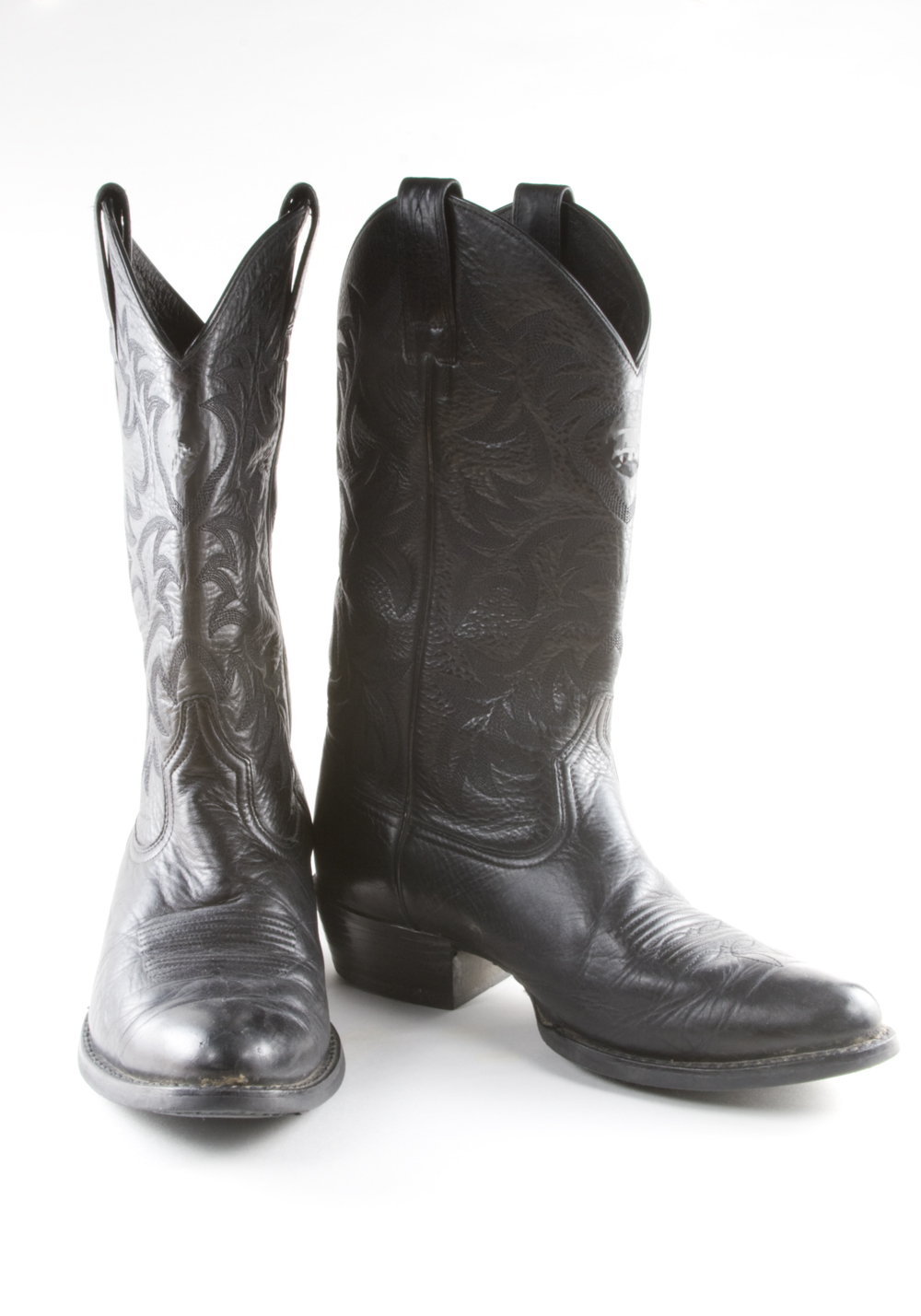
Black leather western Cowboy boots with "walking" heels.

For western riding and showing, western riders wear cowboy boots, with either the high "cowboy" or "riding" heel; the intermediate, somewhat lower "walking" heel; or the low, "roper" style heel that is similar to that of English boots. The uppers may vary in height. The lowest is the "roper" style that stops just a bit above the ankle, about an inch or so higher than the English paddock boot. The most classic length is the mid-calf height that keeps the fenders of a western saddle from chafing the ankle and calf of the rider. The tallest cowboy boots are seldom seen outside of fashion venues, but have an upper that reaches nearly to the knee, are usually extensively decorated, but in the modern day are seldom used for actual horse riding. For pleasure riding, lace-up or zip-up boots similar to English paddock boots, have become popular in recent years, though the classic pull-on boot still is common. Cowboy boots are traditionally made of smooth cowhide, though occasionally a boot style may be of a suede or "roughout" look. However, the uppers of more expensive designs may be made of leather obtained from somewhat exotic creatures, including alligator, ostrich and snakeskin.

== Materials ==
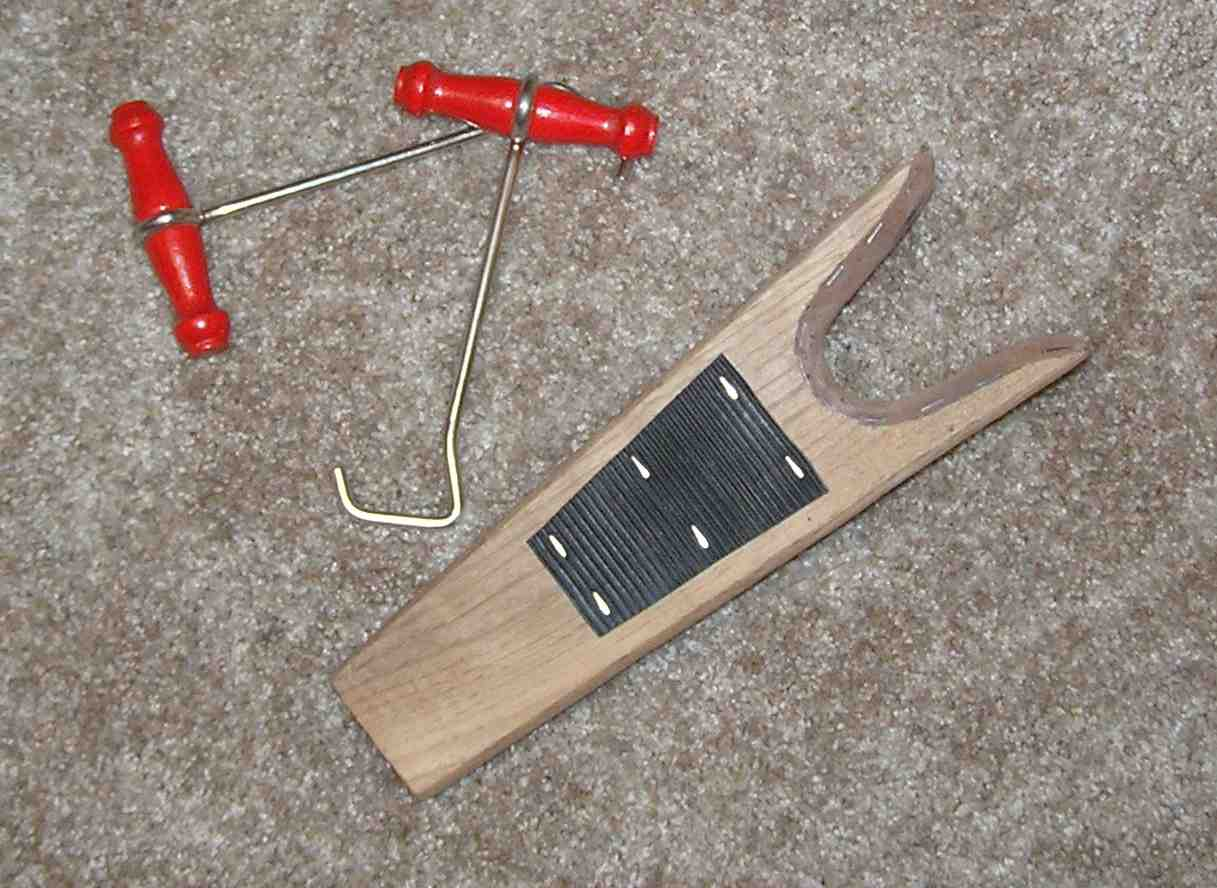
Boot hooks may be required to pull on some riding boots, and a boot jack is often helpful when removing them

Traditionally, English riding boots are made of smooth leather, usually cowhide, or occasionally pigskin, and most show boots remain thus. However, synthetic leather, vinyl and other materials are becoming more common. Quality of leather varies, with softer, finer-quality increasing the value of the boot. For formal wear, patent leather is occasionally seen, particularly in jodhpur boots designed for saddle seat horse show classes held after 6:00 pm, when formal attire may be worn in certain types of competition.

== See also ==
- Hessian (boot)
- Wellington boot
- List of boots
- List of shoe styles
