= Warmbat =

US-based footwear manufacturer

- Industry: Footwear
- Founded: 1969; 57 years ago
- Headquarters: Perth, Western Australia
- Website: warmbat.com

Warmbat was a US-based footwear manufacturer that made Australian sheepskin boots, fashion sneakers, work boots and fashionable footwear. This brand was first introduced in Perth, Western Australia in 1969 making it one of the oldest manufacturers of sheepskin boots. The company had offices in Dayton, Ohio as well as Perth.

== Overview ==
The company used Aboriginal artwork in its logo and various footwear designs and was one of the largest manufacturers of sheepskin boots in the world that used only Australian sheepskin in its products.

Warmbat is trademarked in 26 countries and was sold in various countries including Australia, the United States, Canada, Hong Kong, Japan, Germany, Russia and the United Kingdom.

Featured in the Australian documentary The Good, the Bad and the UGG Boot, Warmbat competes with Deckers Outdoor Corporation, which owns the trademark "UGG" in the US.

Warmbat sheepskin boots were sold in over 20 countries however, in 2009, the CEO and Founder left Warmbat to start a new sheepskin boot company: Green Lizard Australia.

Warmbat is now owned by a Dutch company and is mainly sold in Europe and Japan.
