= Steger Design =

Steger Design, Inc
- Company type: Apparel
- Industry: Footwear
- Founded: Ely, Minnesota 1986
- Headquarters: Ely, Minnesota, United States
- Products: Shoes
- Owner: Patti Steger
- Website: mukluks.com

Steger Design, Inc is a privately held maker of winter boots and moccasins based in Ely, Minnesota. The brand Steger Mukluks was founded in 1986 by Patti Steger when friends came to her with their own piece of leather to be made into mukluk boots.
