= Composite plate =

Plate made out of composite materials

A composite plate is basically a plate made out of composite materials, i.e. a resin and a fibre. Its mechanical evaluation is more detailed than a normal isotropic plate as it has different material properties in different directions. Composite materials are very light and strong and hence much used in aircraft and spacecraft industries. They are also readily available.

Composites are further divided into main two classifications, namely resin and matrix material.
