= West Coast Shoe Company =

American-based shoe manufacturer

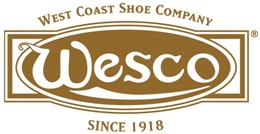
- Type: Private
- Industry: Designing and Manufacturing
- Founder: John Henry Shoemaker (1918)
- Headquarters: Scappoose, Oregon, United States
- Key people: Roberta Shoemaker, President and CEO Peggy LeBlanc, Secretary and Treasurer
- Products: Footwear
- Number of employees: 32
- Website: https://builder.wescoboots.com

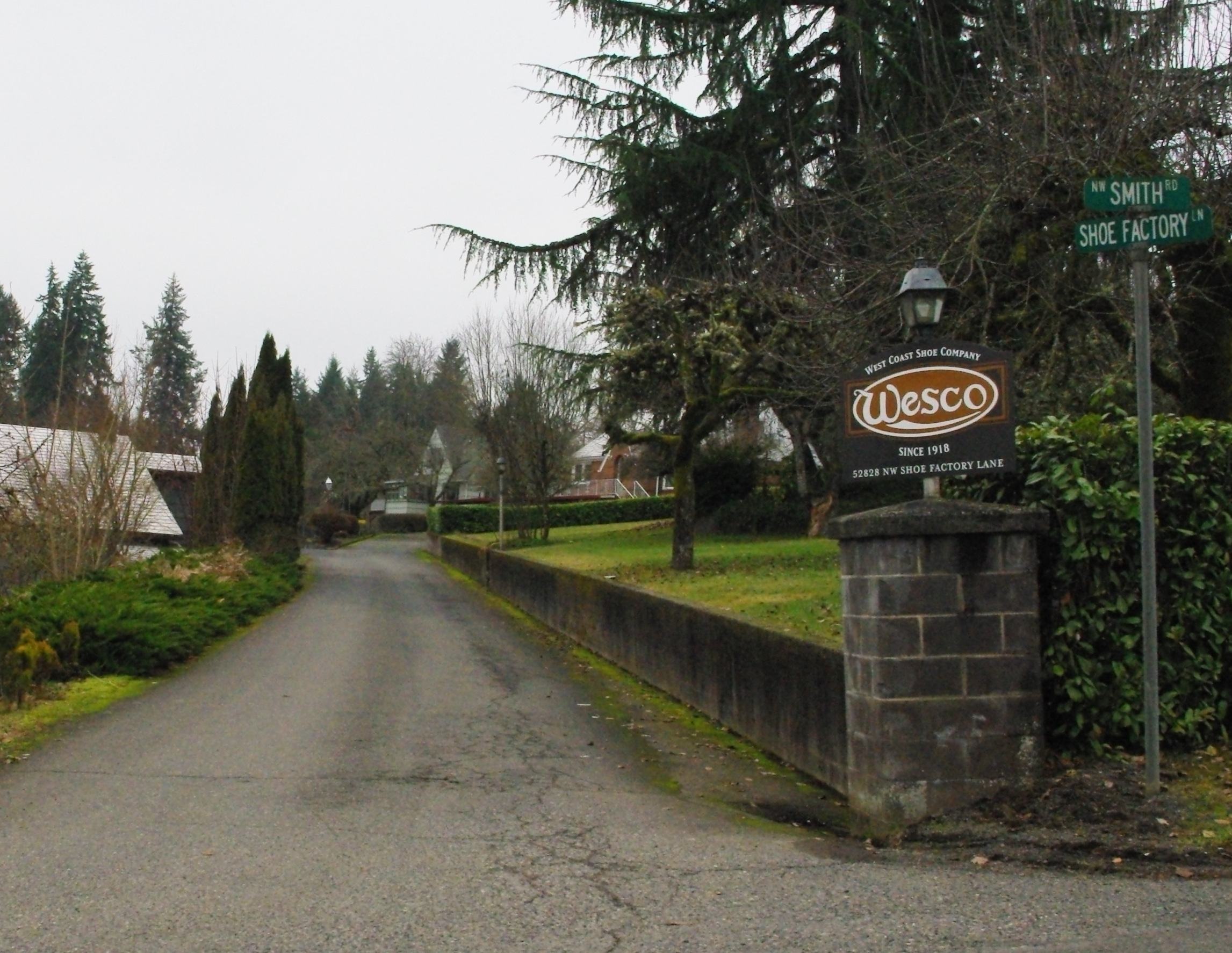
Entrance road to the headquarters

West Coast Shoe Company, commonly known as Wesco, is an American manufacturer of men's and women's boots based in Scappoose, Oregon. The company was founded in 1918 and still manufactures all its boots in the United States. Wesco is especially known for making work boots used by linemen, loggers, wildland firefighters, bikers, and other rugged outdoor use.
