= Clog =

Footwear made in part or completely of wood

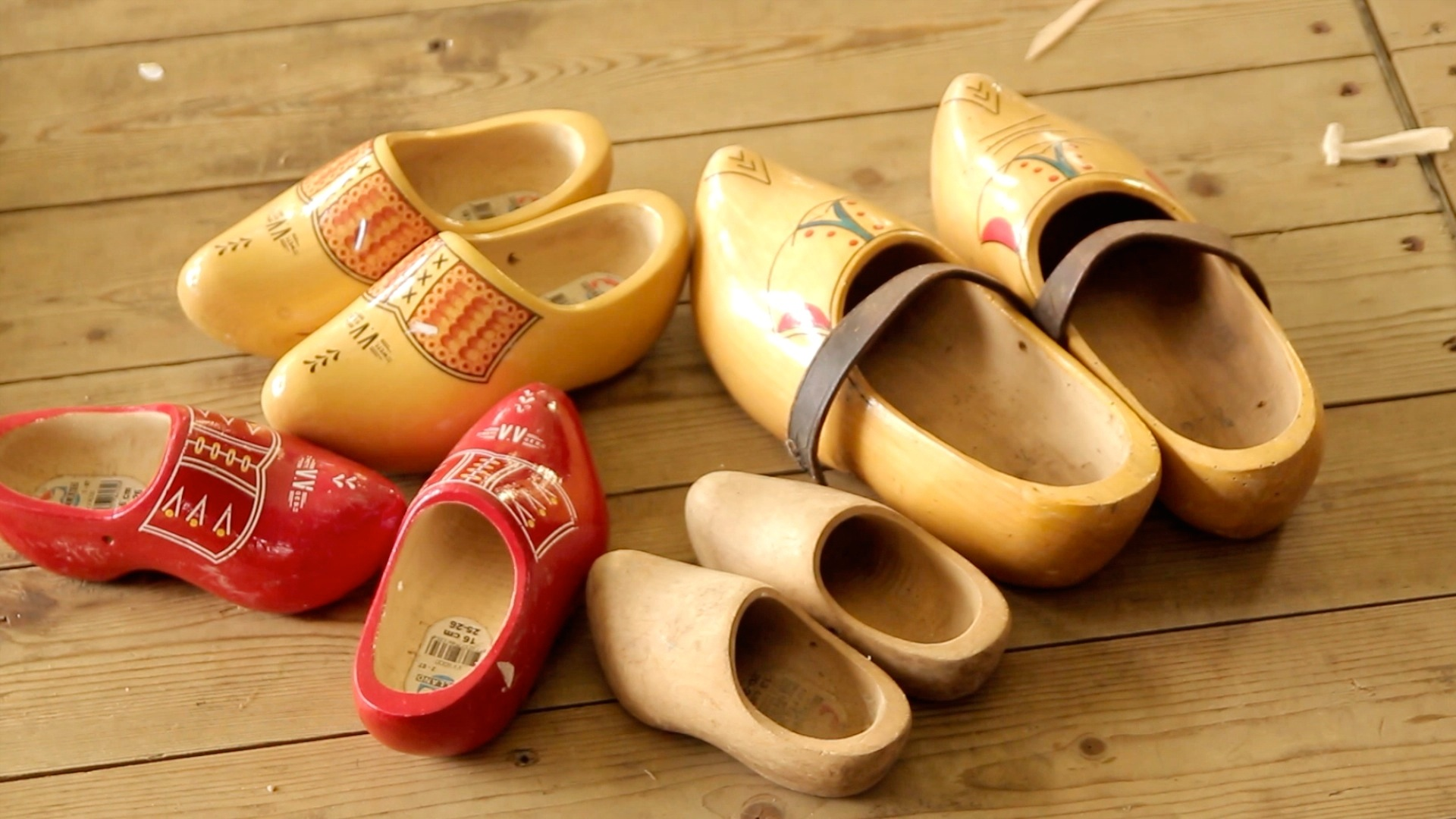
Klompen from the Netherlands

Clogs are a type of footwear that has a thick, rigid sole typically made of wood, although in American English, shoes with rigid soles made of other materials are also called clogs.

Traditional clogs remain in use as protective footwear in agriculture and in some factories and mines. Although they are sometimes associated with rustic and folkloric footwear of farmers and the working class, some types are considered fashion wear today, such as Swedish träskor or Japanese geta.

Clogs are also used in several different styles of dance, where an important feature is the sound they produce against the floor. Clog dancing is one of the fundamental roots of tap dancing, but with tap shoes the taps are free to click against each other and produce a different sound from clogs. In the Netherlands, there is a traditional dance style called the klompendans ('clog dance').

Many modern brands produce clogs, most famously the US company Crocs.

== Typology ==
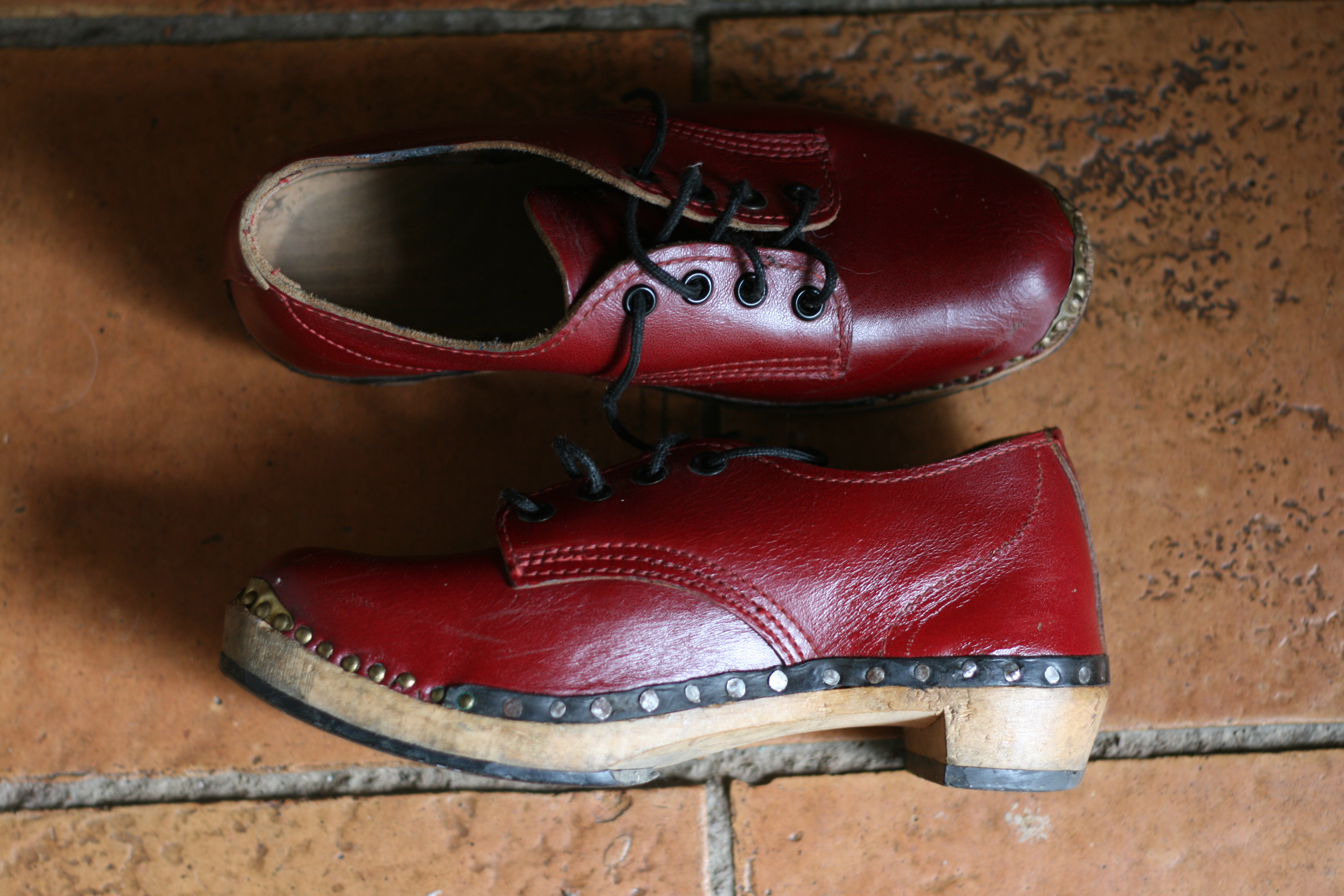
Wooden soled type English clogs

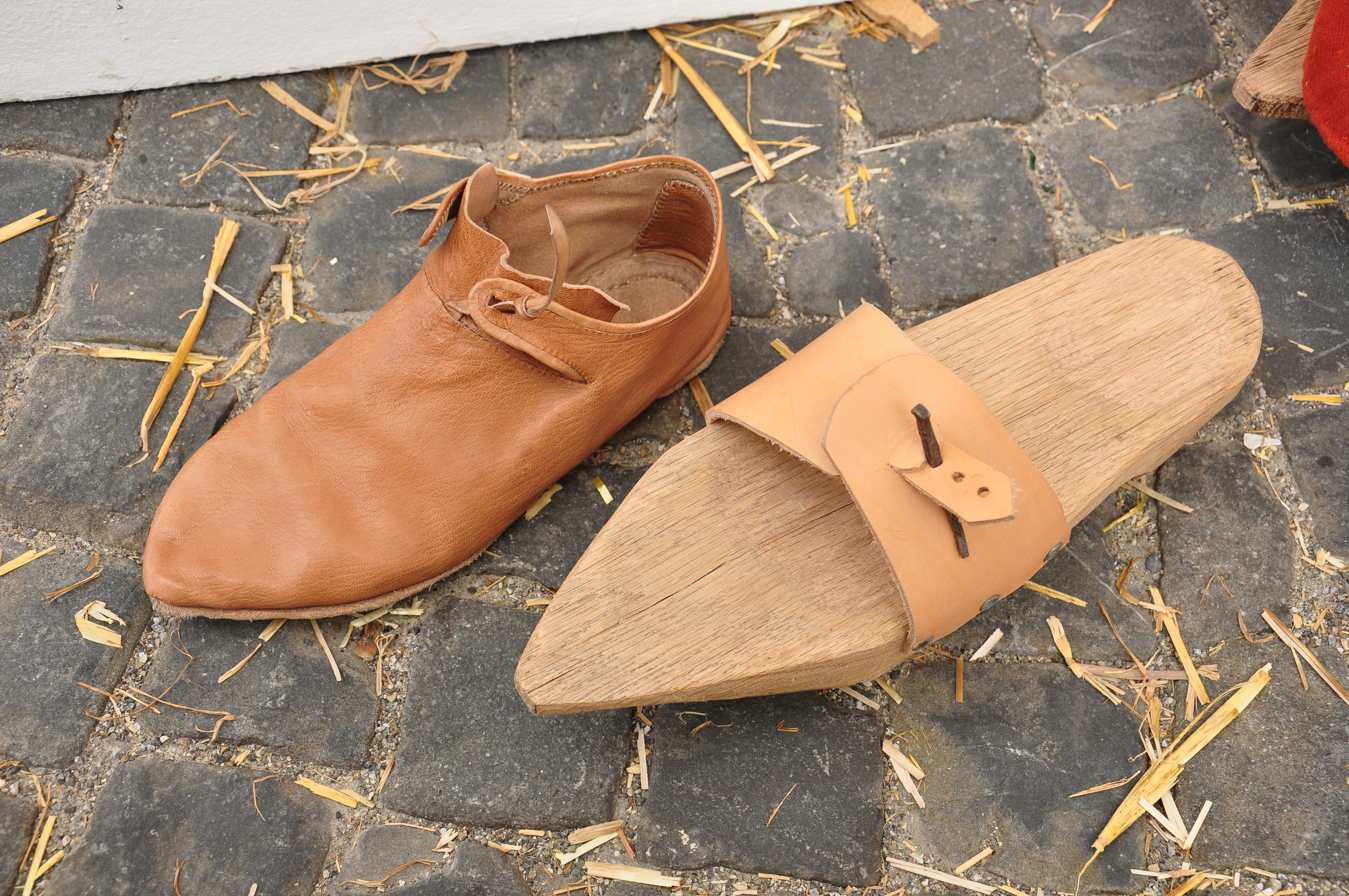
Overshoes type of clogs (pattens) with leather turnshoes (German), reconstruction of the Middle Ages

The Oxford English Dictionary defines a clog as a "thick piece of wood", and later as a "wooden soled overshoe" and a "shoe with a thick wooden sole".

Welsh traditional clog maker Trefor Owen identified three main varieties of clogs: wooden upper, wooden soled and overshoes.

- Wooden upper clogs; are made by hollowing out a lump of solid wood to make a combined upper and lower. Two main variants can be seen:
  - whole foot clogs; where the wooden upper covers the whole of the foot to near the ankle, such as the Dutch klomp. They are also known as "wooden shoes". Whole foot clogs can give sufficient protection to be used as safety footwear without additional reinforcements.
  - half open clogs; where the wooden upper extends over the toes or slightly further, such as the Belgian sabots. The upper is similar in outline to a court shoe. Half open clogs may have additional covering or securing straps in some sort of fabric or leather.
- Wooden soled clogs; use wood for the sole only. Wooden soled clogs come with a variety of uppers:
  - complete uppers made from leather or similar material, such as English clogs. For more protection, they may have steel toecaps and/or steel reinforcing inserts in the undersides of the soles
  - open sandal type fitting. For example, Japanese geta
  - toe peg styles. For example, Indian paduka
- Overshoes; are wooden soles with straps designed to be worn over other footwear for protection, commonly known as pattens. Patten style clogs are not used anymore. However the derivative galoshes are common worldwide.

These divisions are not fixed: some overshoes look more like whole foot clogs, like Spanish albarca, whilst other wooden soled clogs raise and protect clothing in the way that overshoes do, such as Japanese geta.

The type of upper determines how the clogs are worn. Whole foot clogs need to be close fitting and can be secured by curling the toes. In contrast wooden soled clogs are fastened by laces or buckles on the welt and therefore the toes are relaxed as in shoes. Half open clogs may either be secured like whole foot clogs, or have an additional strap over the top of the foot. Some sandal types, and in particular toe peg styles, are worn more like "flip-flops" and rely on the grip between the big and next toe.

== Flexing the foot ==
As they are primarily made from wood, clogs cannot flex under the ball of the foot as softer shoes do. To allow the foot to roll forward most clogs have the bottom of the toe curved up, known as the cast. Some styles of clogs have "feet", such as Spanish albarca. The clog rotates around the front edge of the front "feet". Some Japanese and Indian clogs have "teeth" or very high pegs attached to the soles. The clog can rotate around the front edge of the front "tooth" as the wearer strides forward. Some medieval pattens were in two pieces, heel through to ball and ball to toes. Joining the two was a leather strip forming a hinge, thus allowing the shoe above to flex. Klompen may have a carefully placed ease (space left around the foot), which allows the foot to bend, and the heel to lift within or out of the clog. Thick, springy wool socks provide flexibility in the fit.

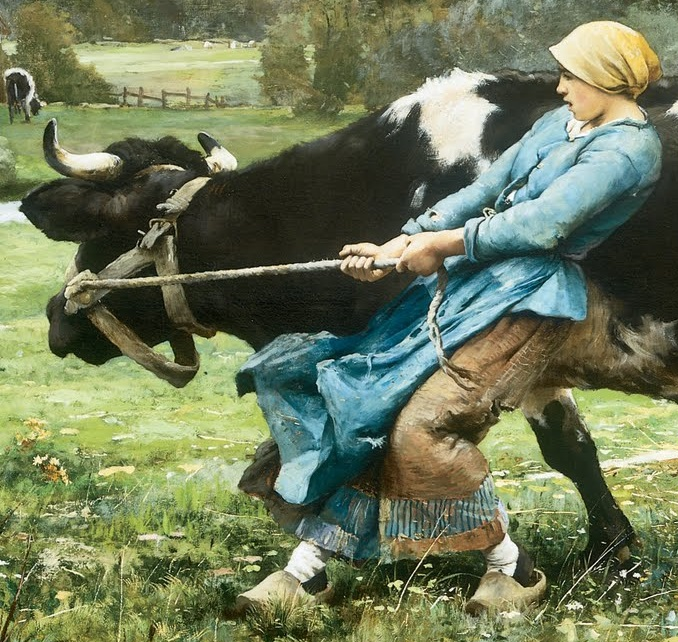
This cowherd appears to be wearing thick white wool socks and black leather turnshoes under her wooden overshoes, which are eased.

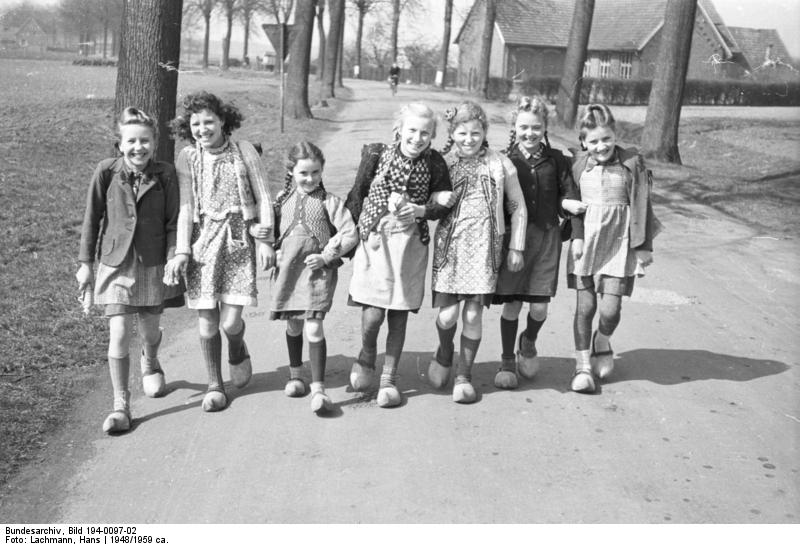
Here the rearmost portion of the vamp is elastic leather, and the shoe rotates using the cast of the toe.

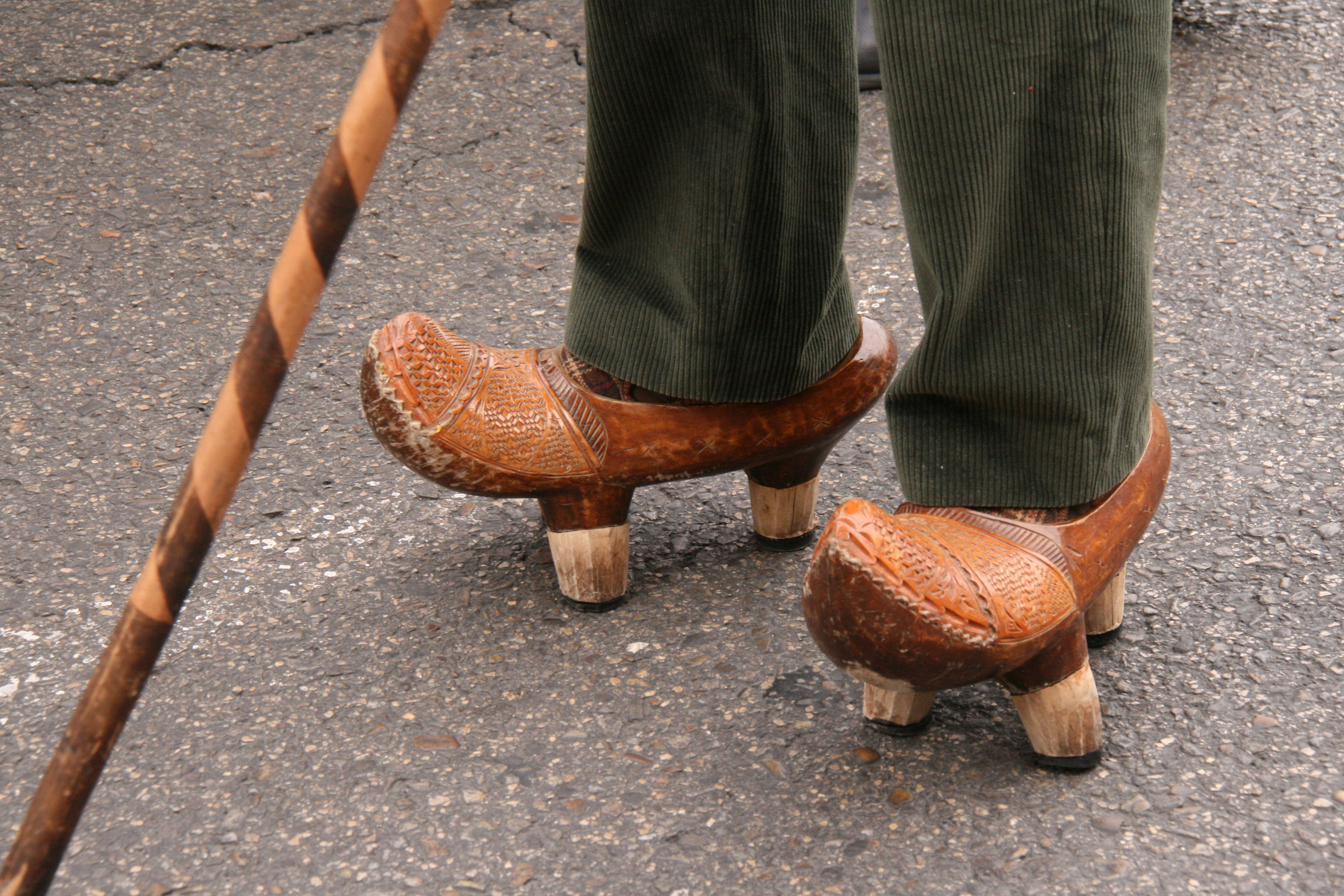
Albarcas have three feet

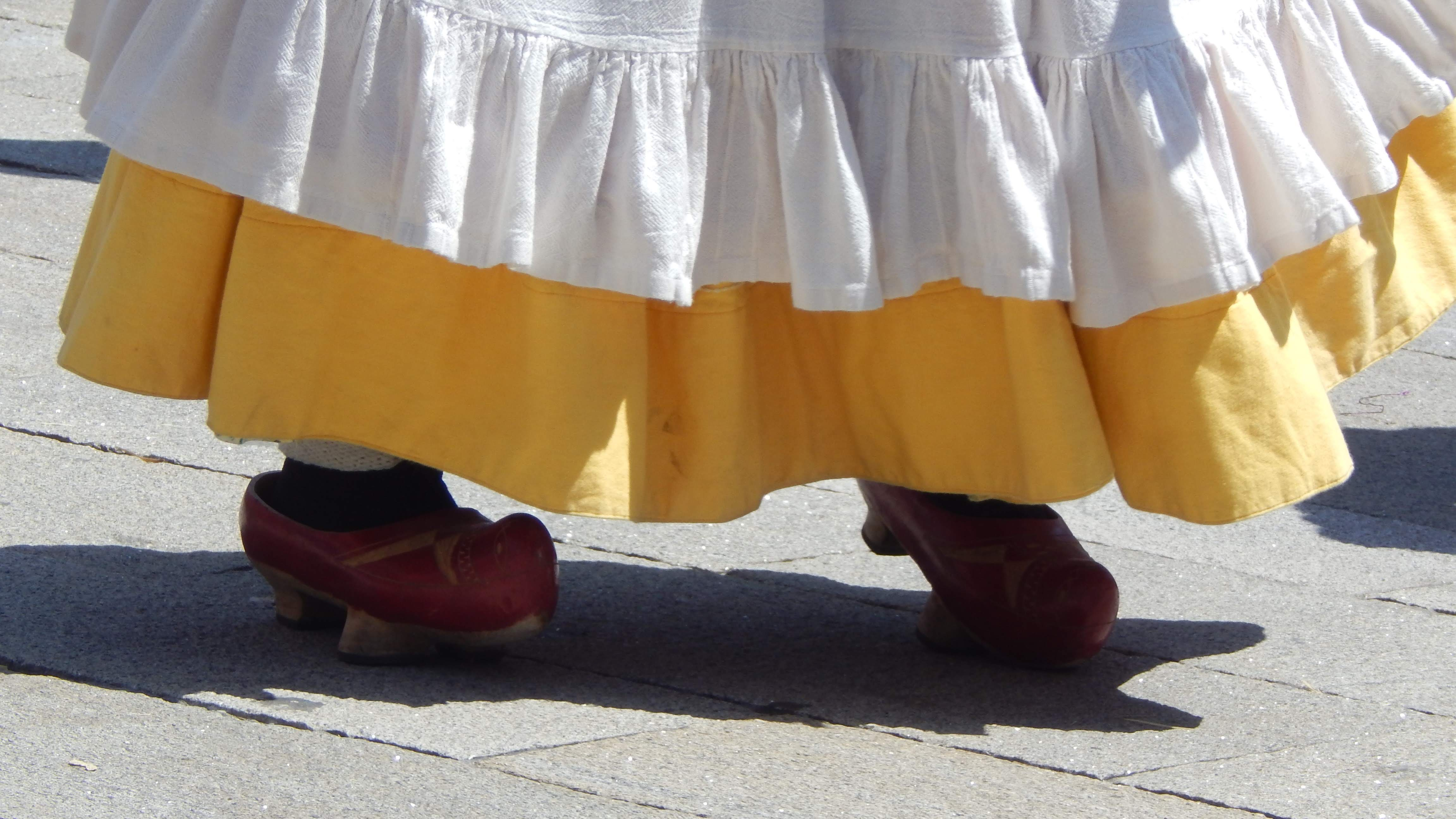
Some clogs rotate around the front clog-feet, located under the ball of the human foot.

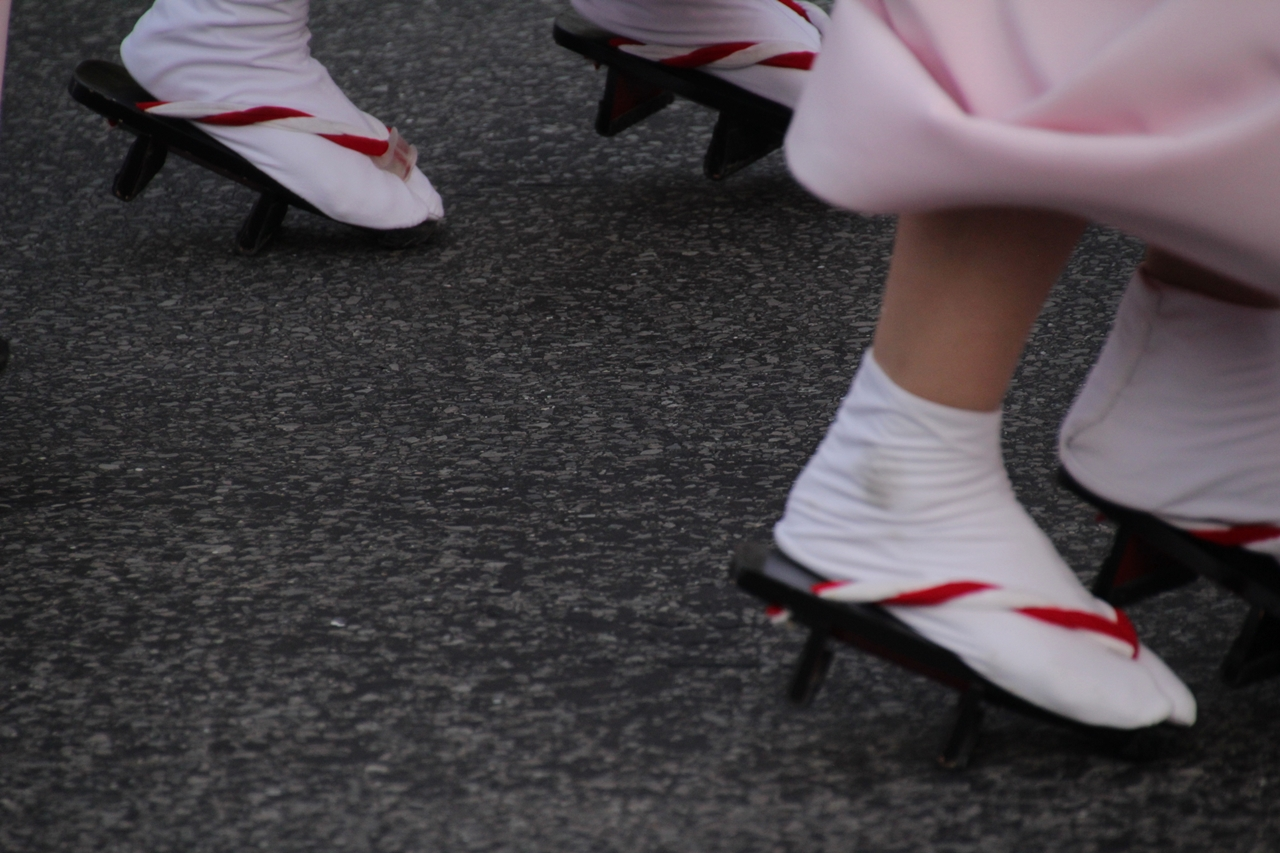
Geta rotate around the front tooth, which must be placed under the ball of the foot.

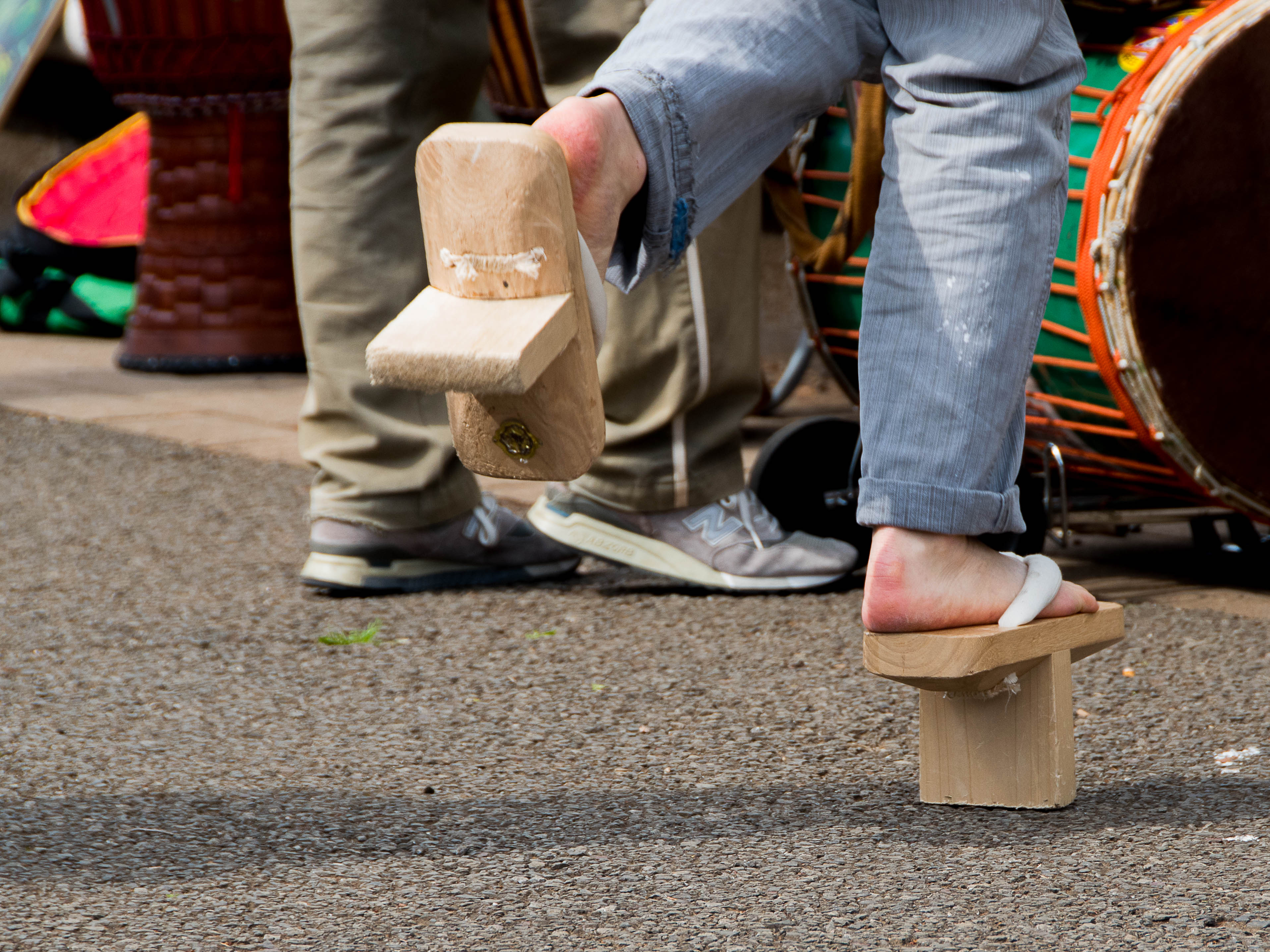
Tengu geta have only one tooth.

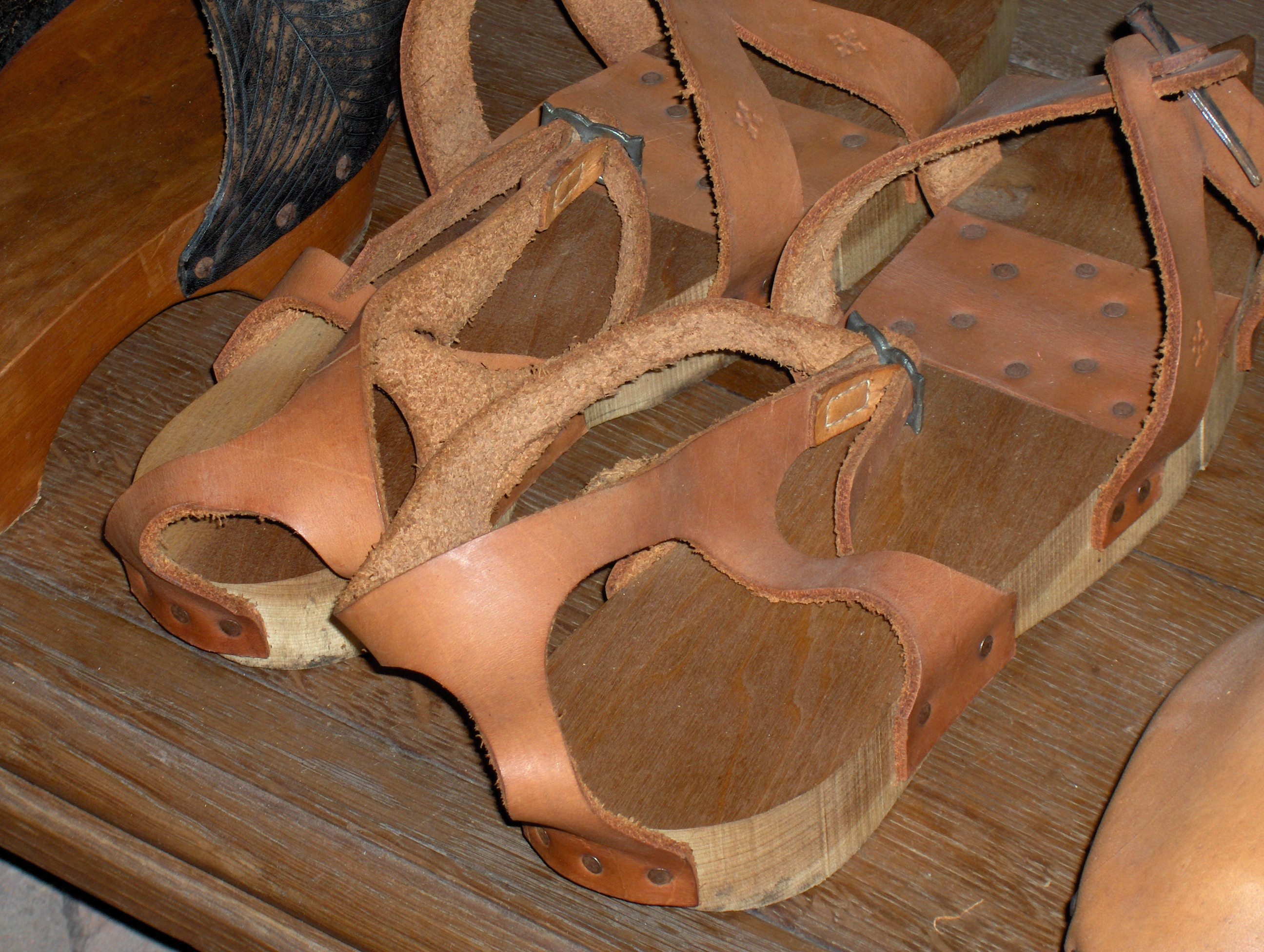
These wooden pattens are hinged at the ball of the foot.

== History ==
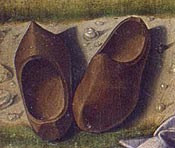
Clogs in a 1400s painting

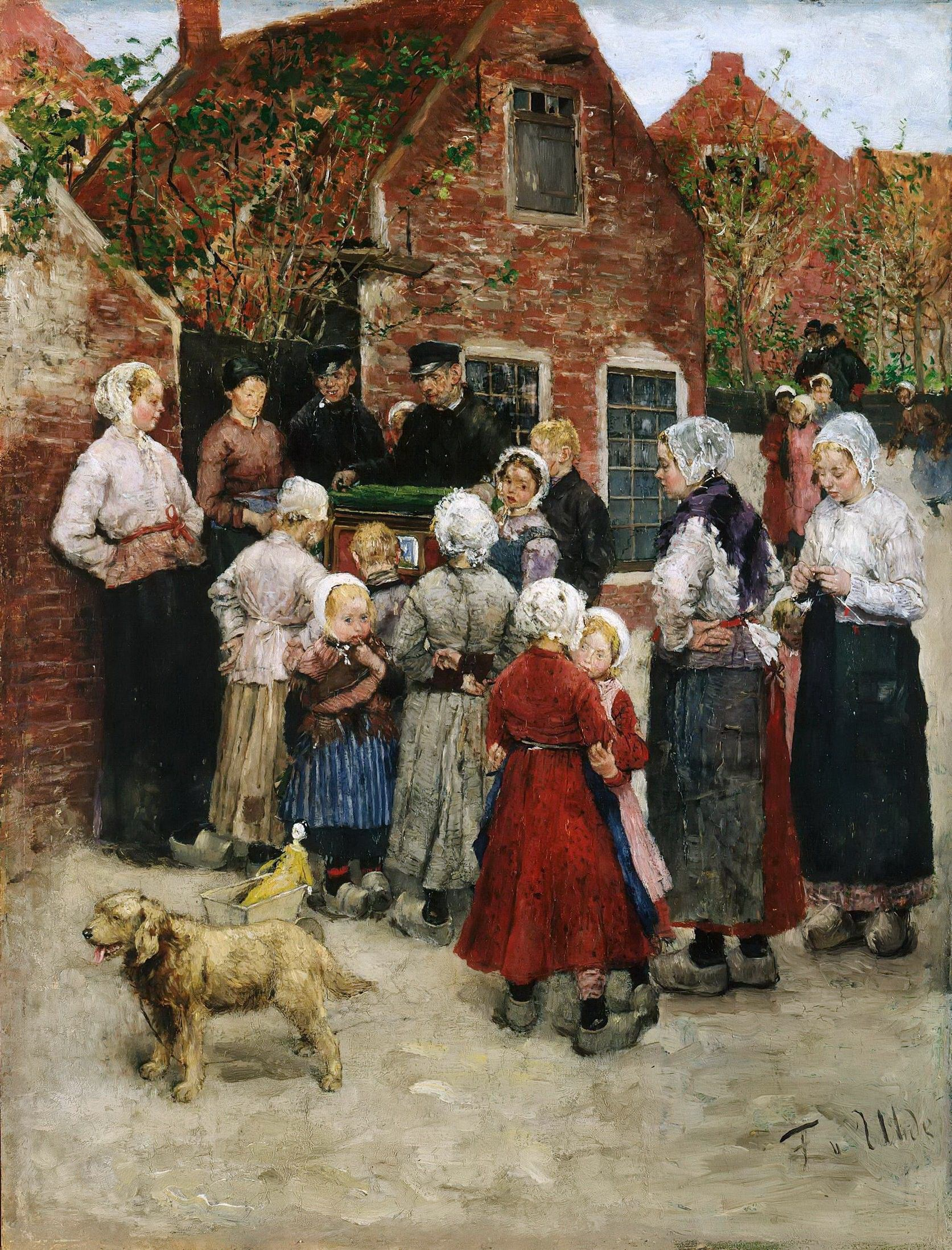
In this 1883 painting by Fritz von Uhde painted in the Dutch town of Zandvoort, klompen are shown to be the 19th century townspeople's common footwear.

The use and prevalence of wooden footwear in prehistoric and ancient times is uncertain, owing both to the ambiguity of surviving records and the difficulty of both preserving and recognizing its remains. Used clogs also tended to be repurposed as firewood.

Some ancient Greeks apparently wore kroúpezai (κρούπεζαι) made of wood. These were known to the Romans as sculponeae. Both the Greeks and Romans also made sandals by attaching leather straps to wooden soles in various ways.

The ancient Chinese wore wooden jī (屐) by at least the Han dynasty, when a form decorated with colorful ribbons and designs was used by women on their wedding days. Under the Jin, a different style shaped the entire shoe from a single piece of wood and, after the Tang, the southern Chinese wore "boot clogs" (靴屐, xuējī). Also in Japan and Korea, there are wooden shoes called geta (下駄) and namaksin (나막신).

The oldest wooden footwear so far recovered in Europe was found at Amsterdam and Rotterdam in the Netherlands. These date from c. 1230 and c. 1280, and looked very similar to the wooden klompen still worn by Dutch farmers to this day.

By about this era, wooden pattens were being used as overshoes to protect the wearer's hose and indoor shoes when walking outside, particularly in inclement weather. Some shoes then began directly incorporating the wooden platform into their soles, like the Venetian chopines.

== Manufacture ==
Since wooden footwear was a hand-made product, the shape of the footwear, as well as its production process showed great local and regional diversity in style. At the beginning of the 20th century machine-made wooden footwear was introduced. After WW2, in particular, wooden shoes became uncommon. They were replaced by more fashionable all-leather and synthetic footwear. At present, only the so-called Swedish clogs (wooden bottom and leather top) is still seen as a trendy fashion item, often as ladies' high-heeled boots. Nevertheless, traditional wooden footwear is still popular in several regions in Europe and in some occupations, for its practical use. Some historic local variations have recently been replaced by uniform national models.

More information on the various methods of manufacture can be found from the gallery below.

== Gallery ==
Presented below are typical clogs from the countries where they are found. Like many folk items, the boundaries of manufacture and use are regional and therefore do not always exactly follow those of modern states. So, in some countries two or more different types can be found. It is also possible that one type can be found in bordering countries. For example, Danish, German, Dutch, Belgian and clogs from Northwest France look quite similar. The links provide access to pages dealing with the different types of clog, their design, origin and manufacture.

=== Traditional European clogs ===
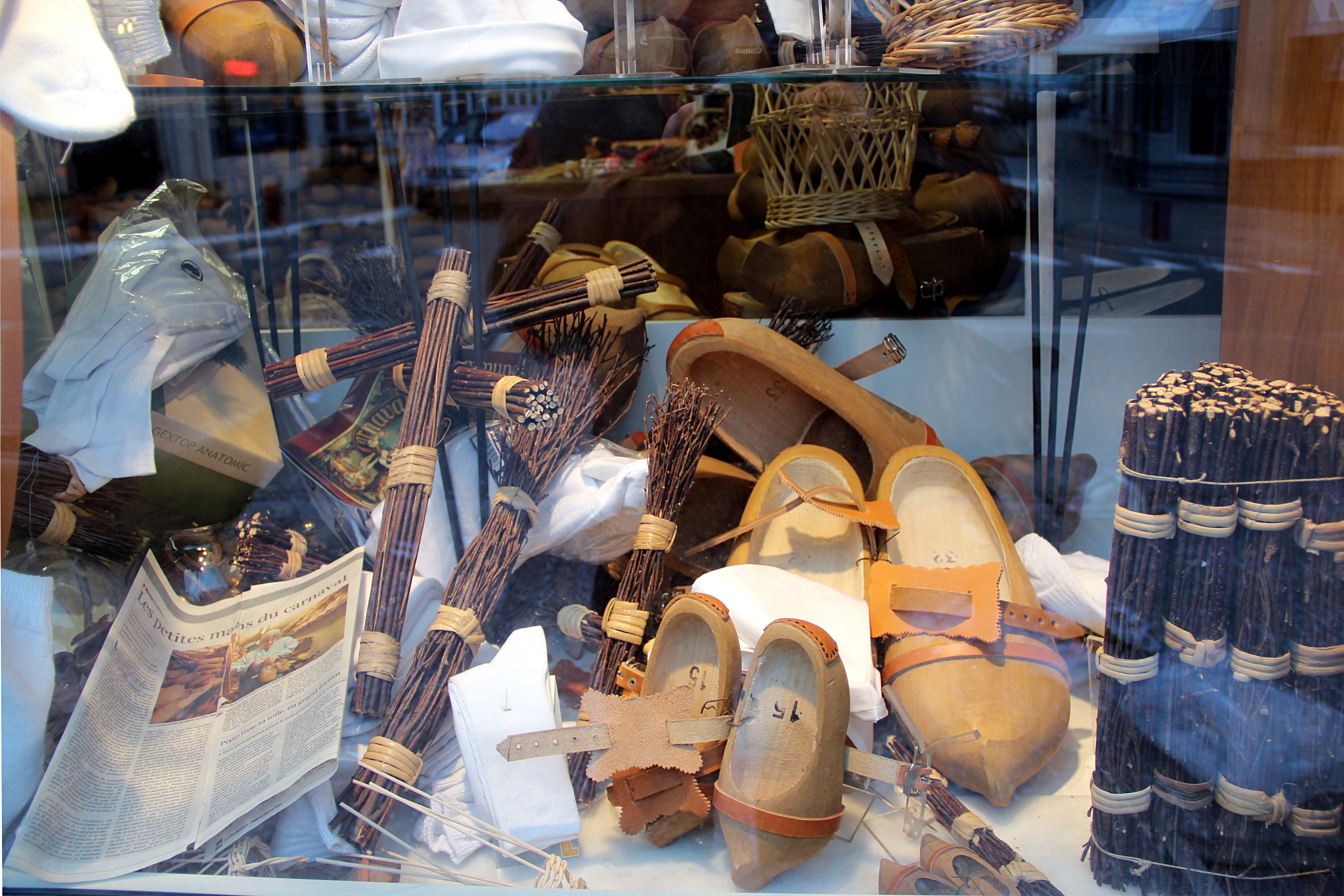
Belgian sabot from Belgium

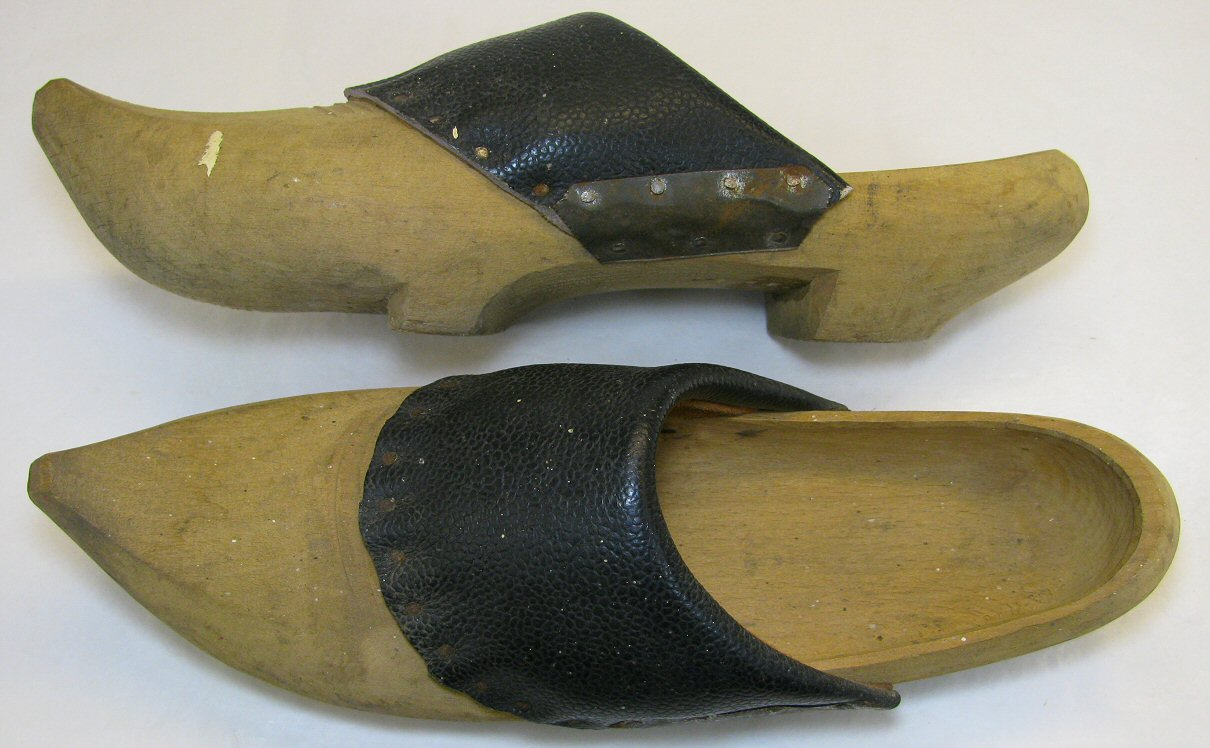
Træsko from Denmark

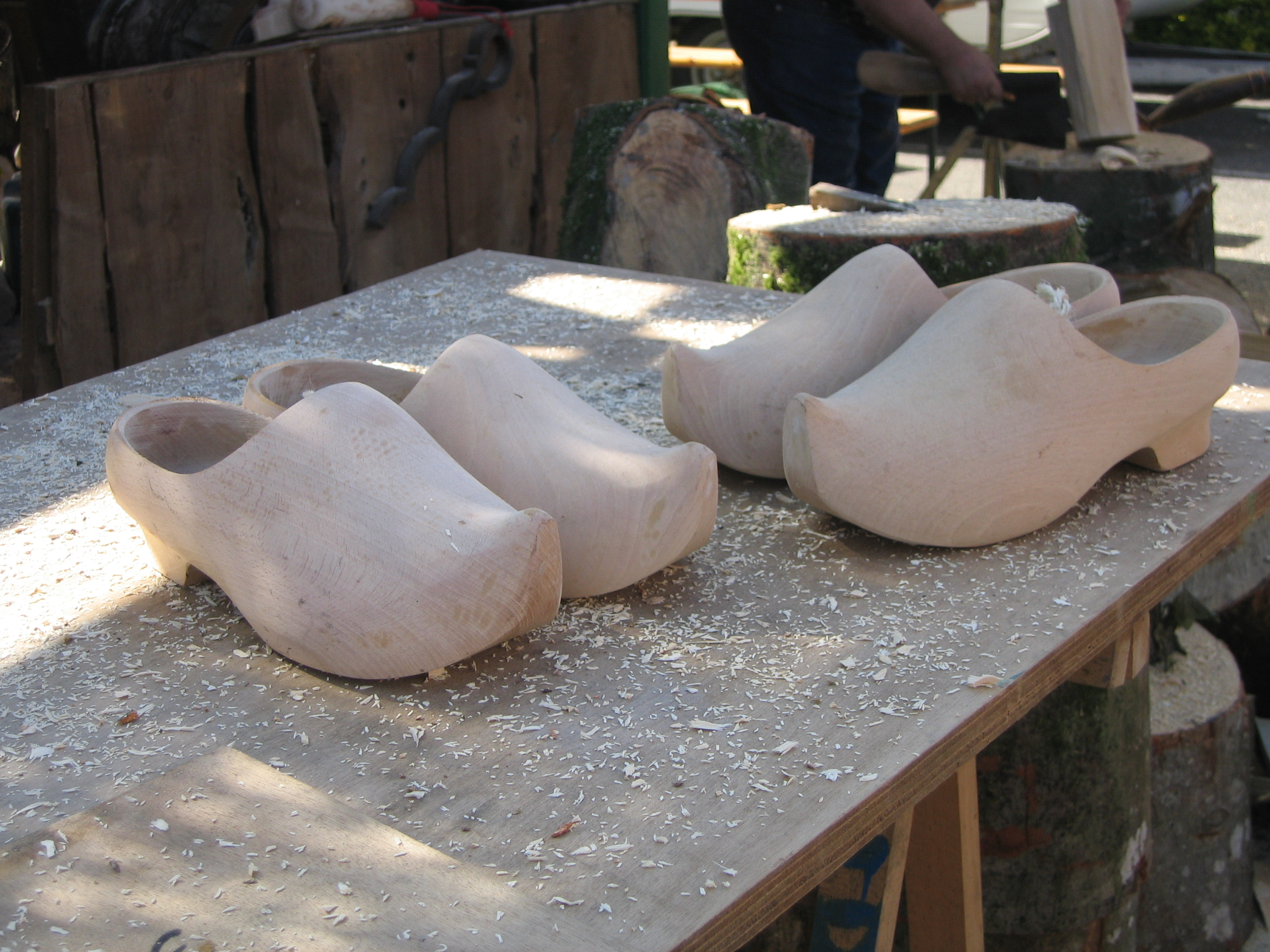
Sabot from France

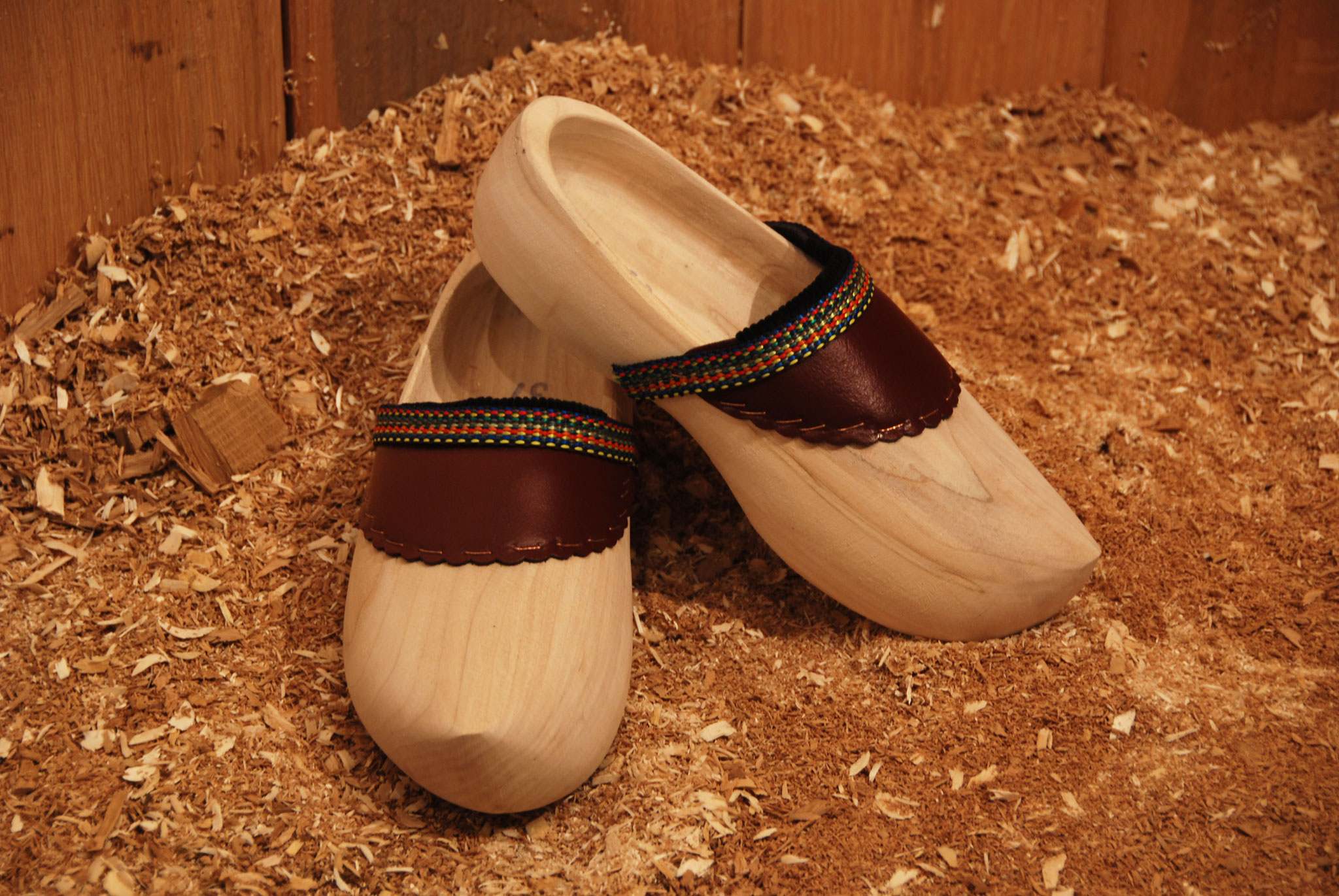
Holzschuh from Germany

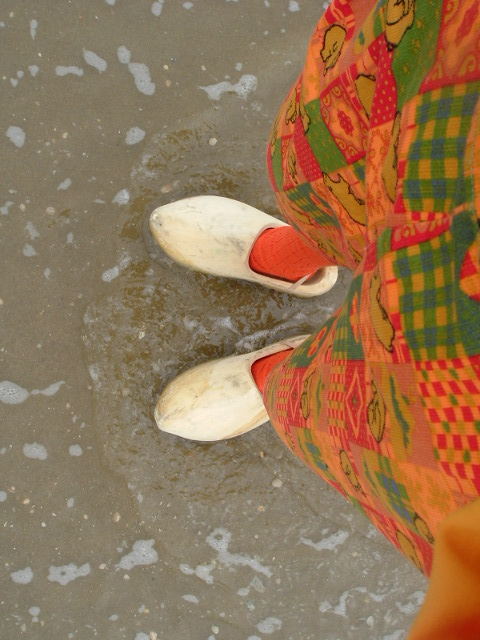
Clogs of the North Sea coasts in surf; they are waterproof.

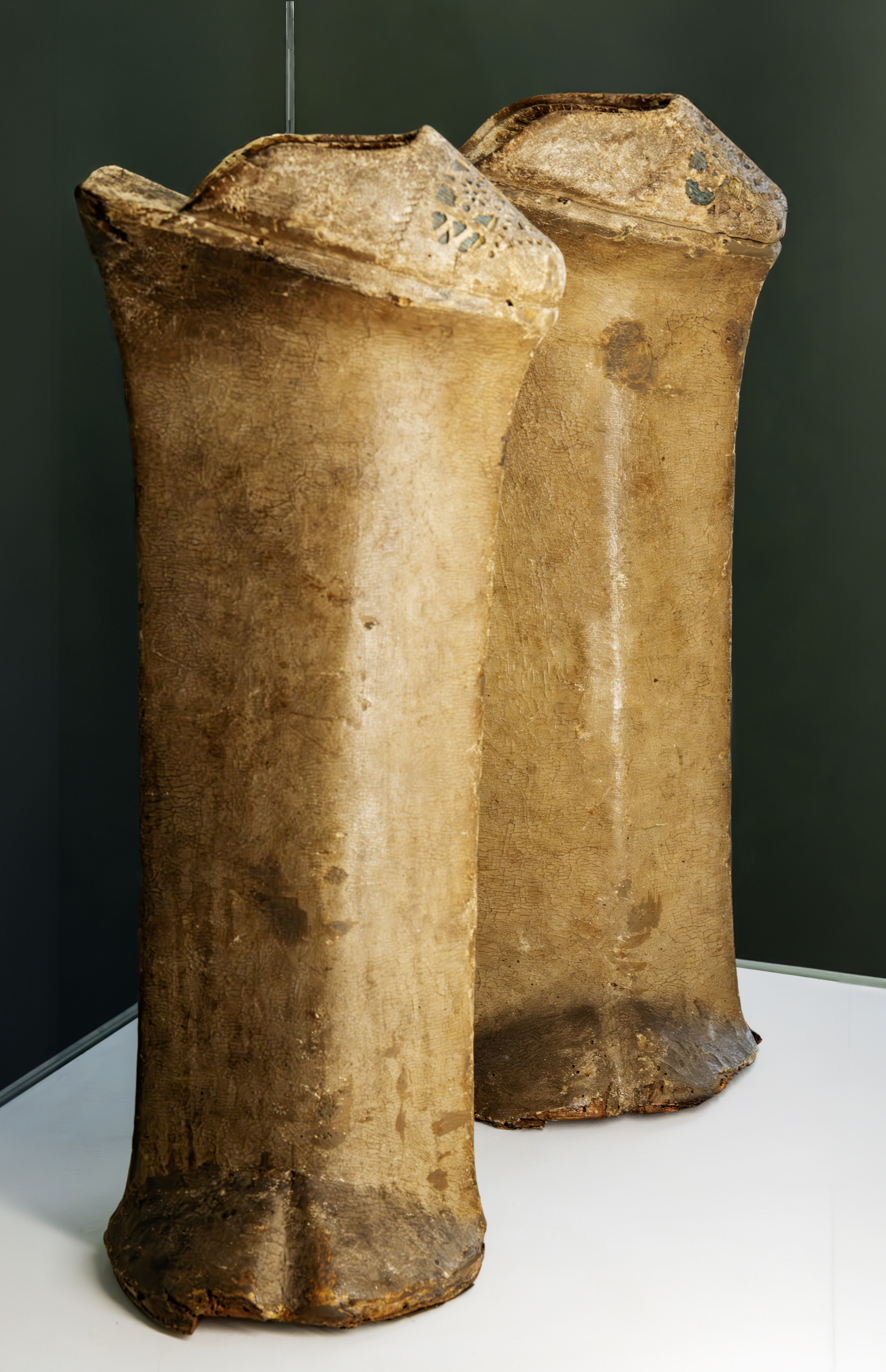
These Venetian chopine models dating from 1500 to 1600 are on display at the Museo Correr Venice.

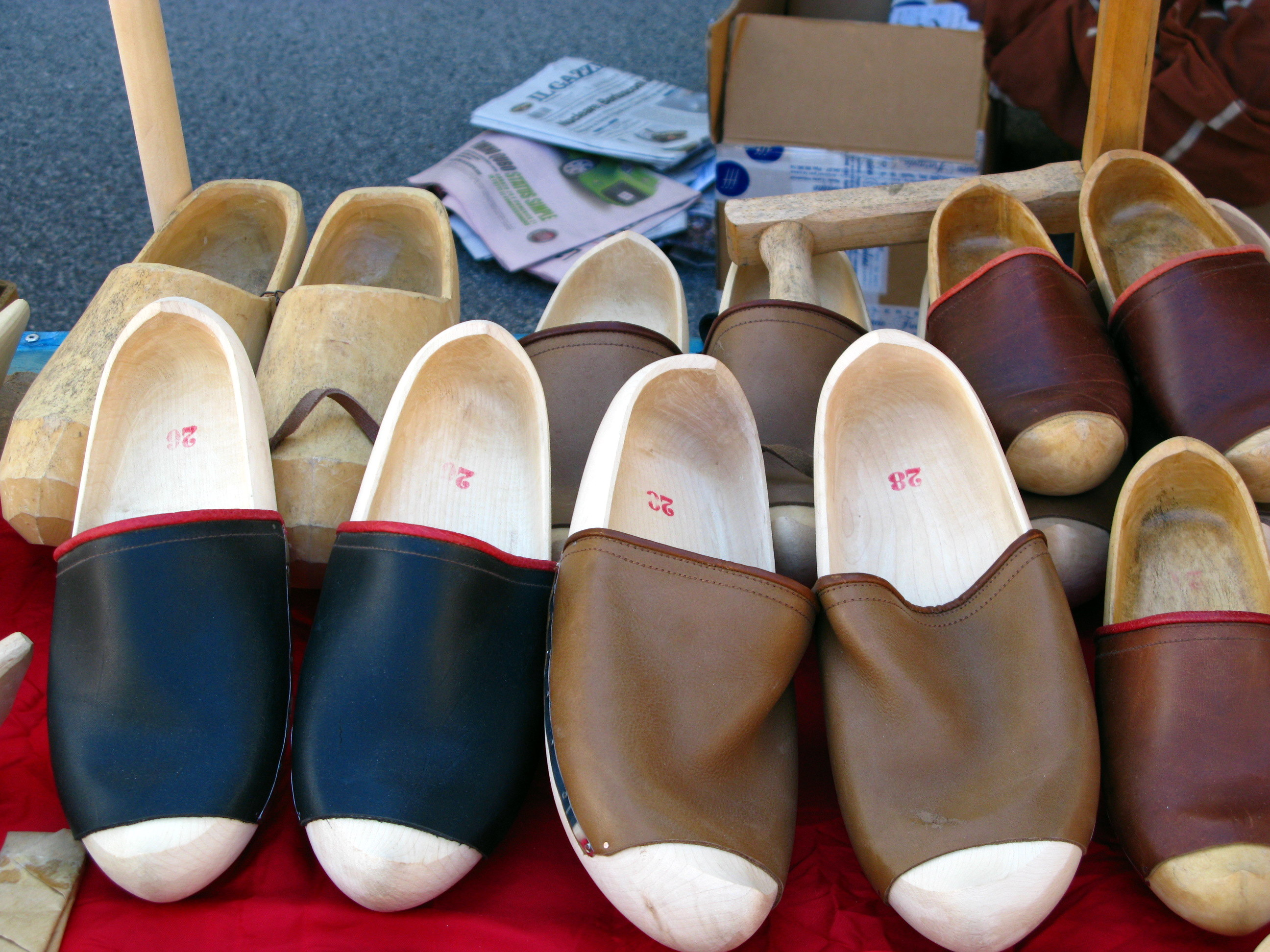
Zoccolo from Italy

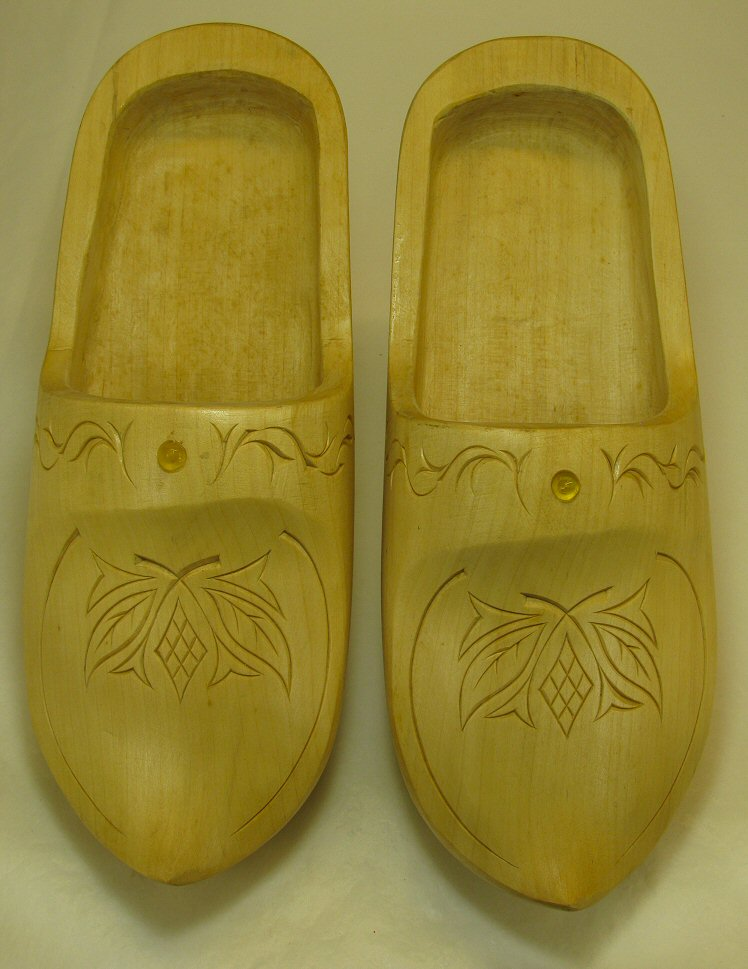
Klumpės from Lithuania

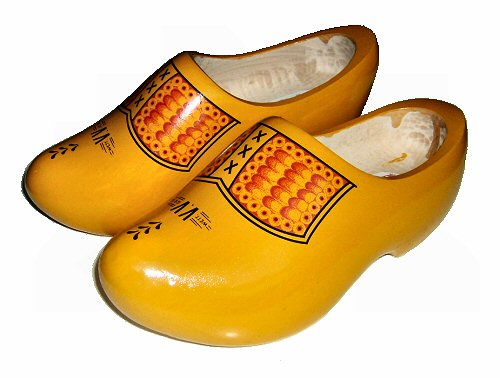
Klompen from the Netherlands

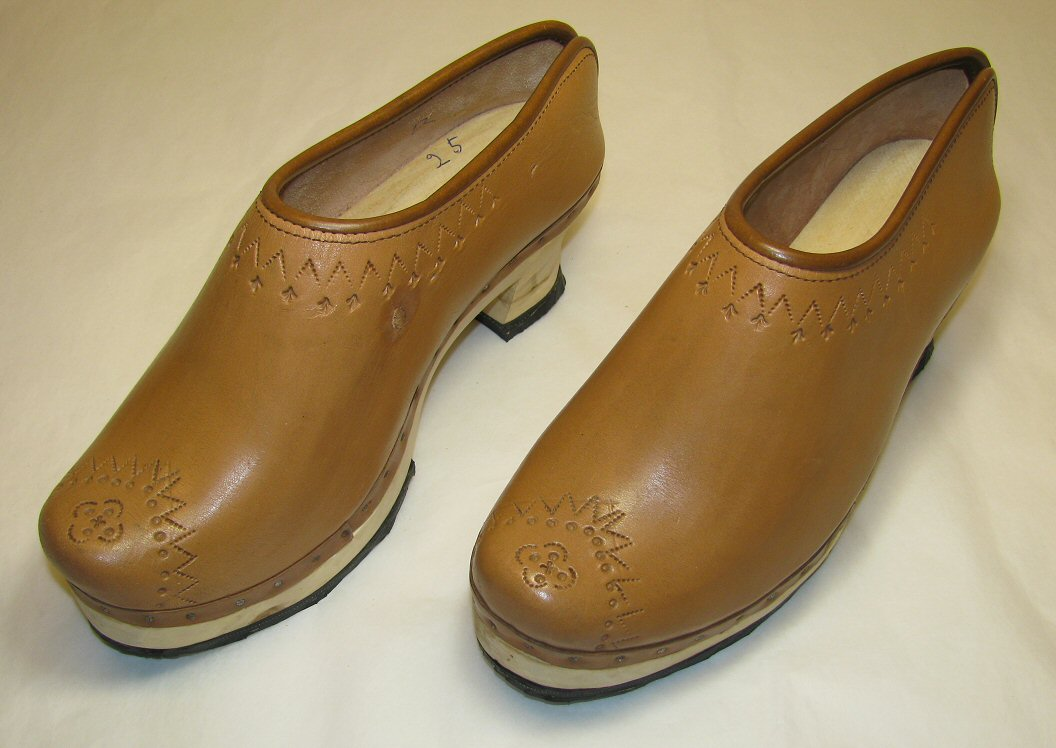
Tamanco from Portugal

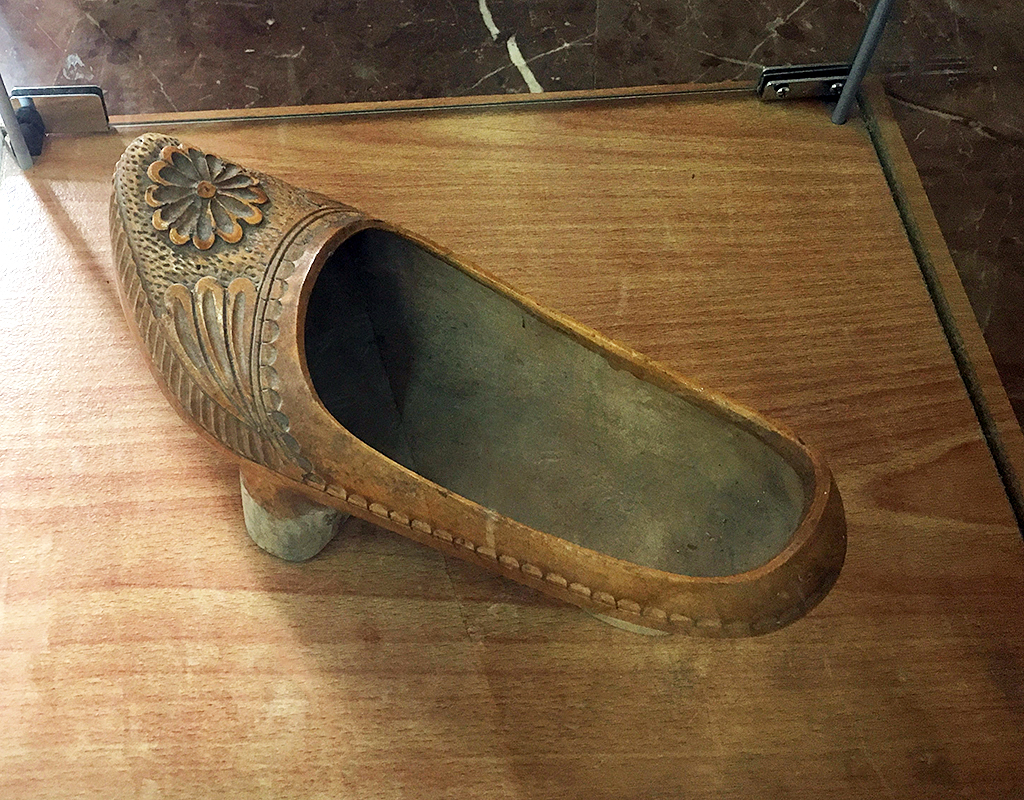
Asturian madreñas from Spain

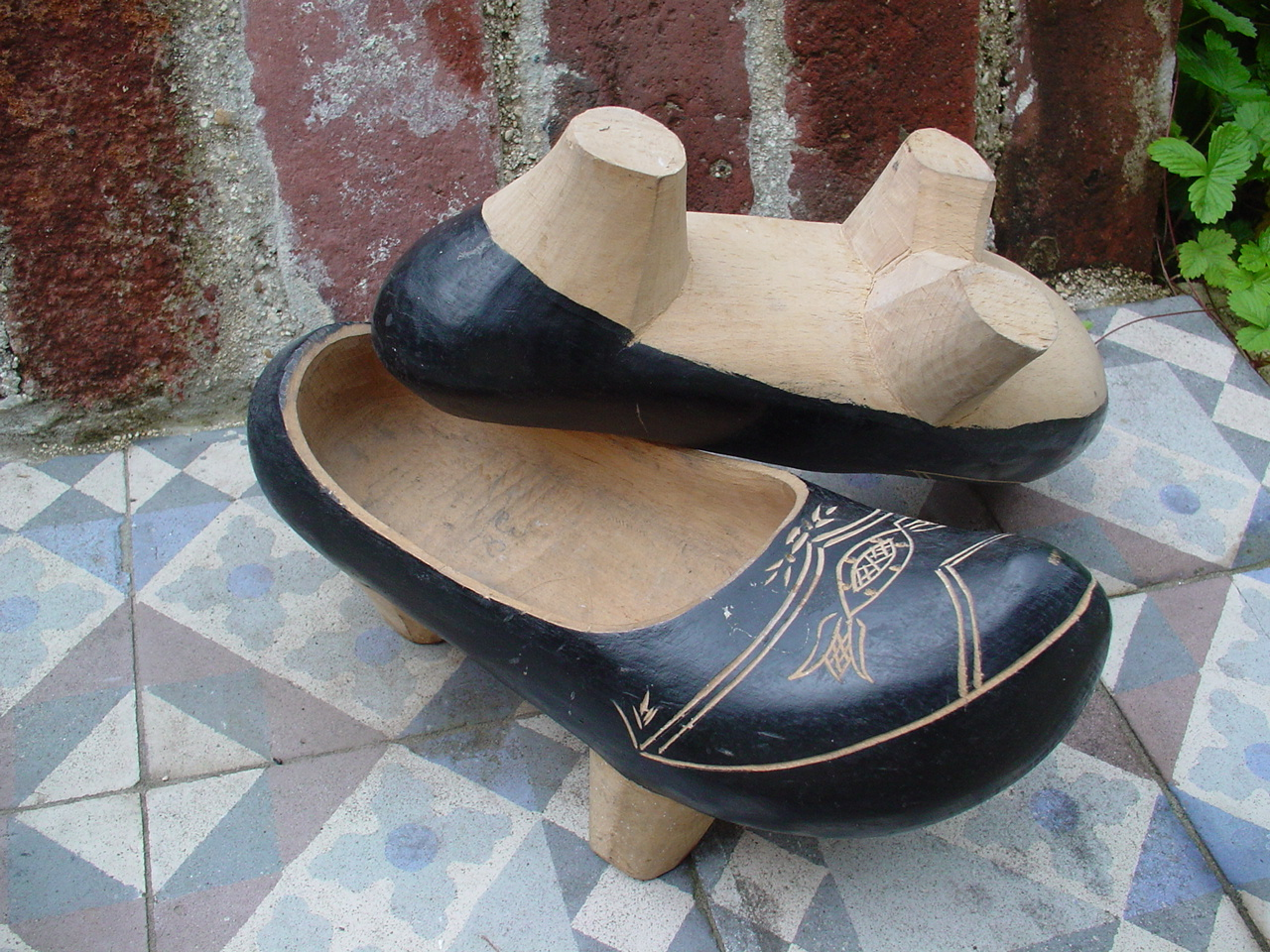
Cantabrian albarcas from Spain

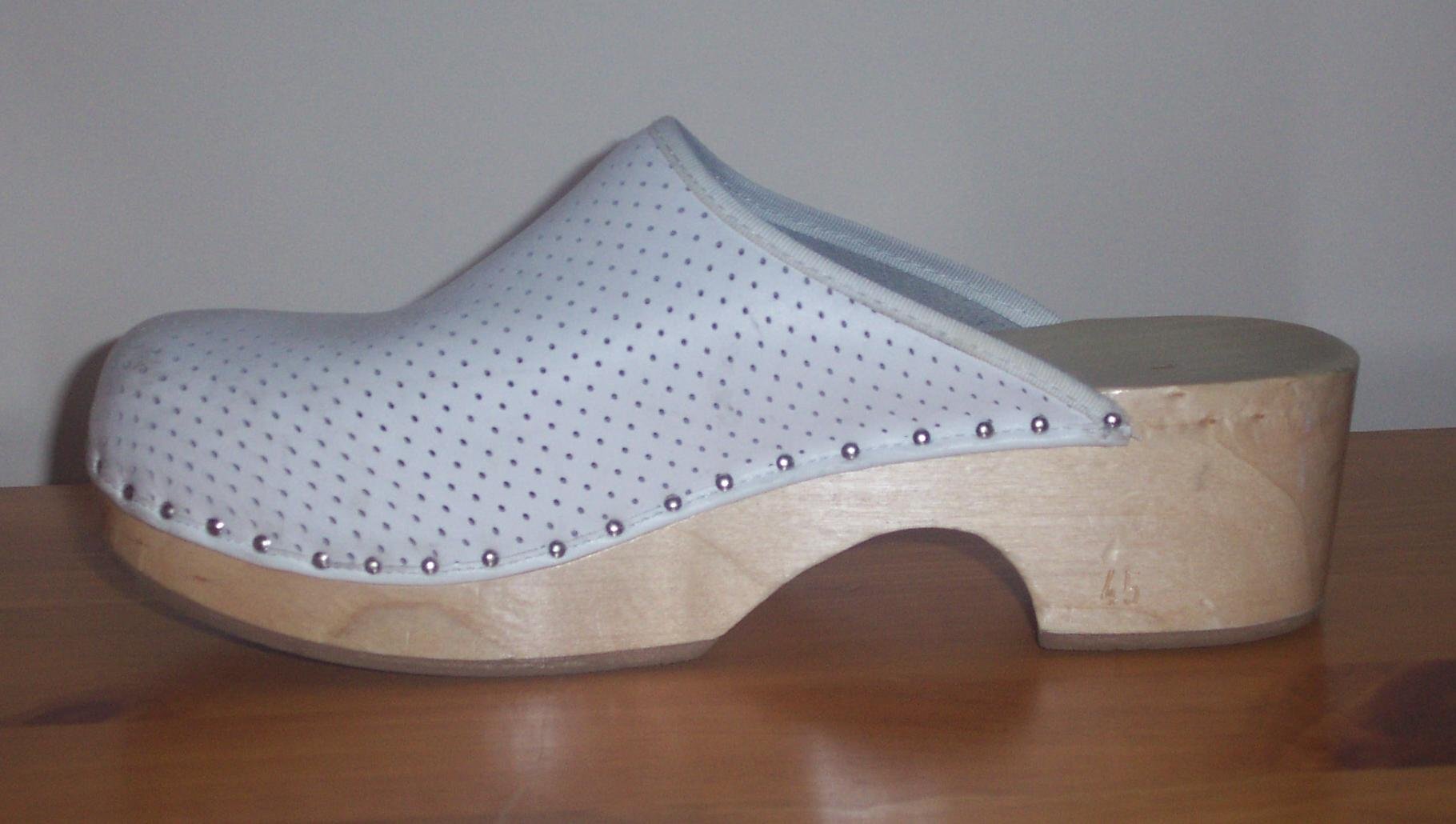
Träskor from Sweden

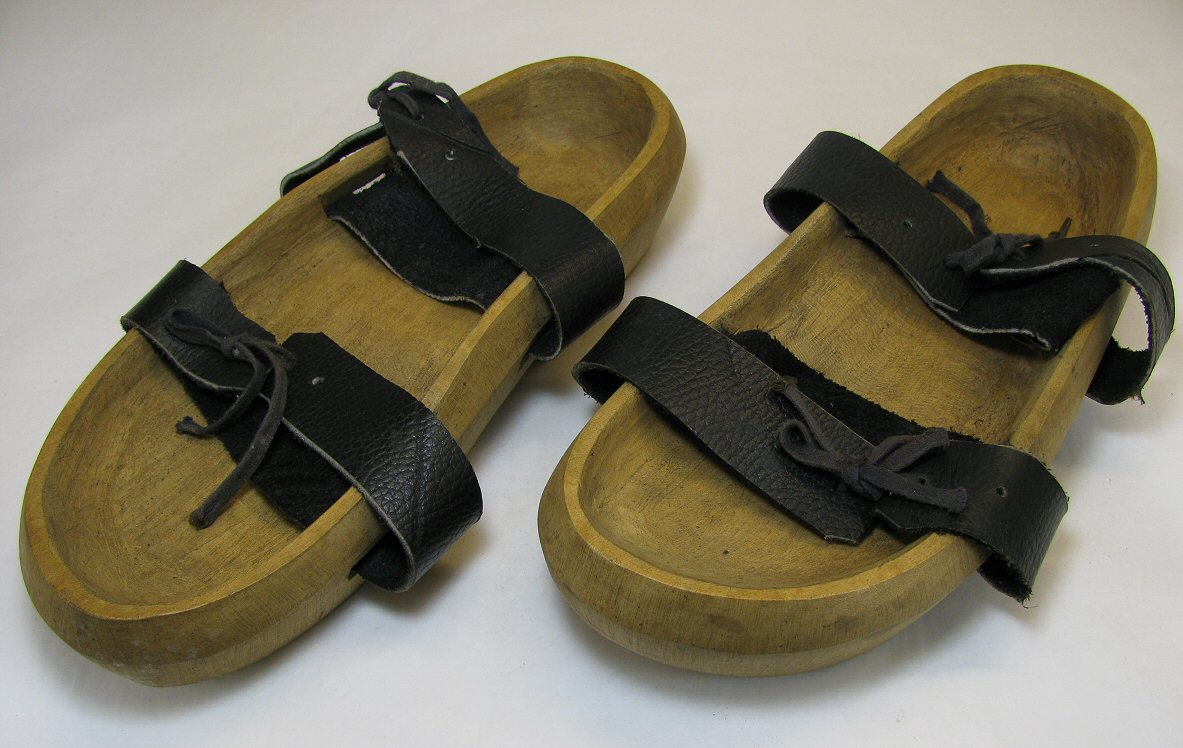
Zoggeli from Switzerland

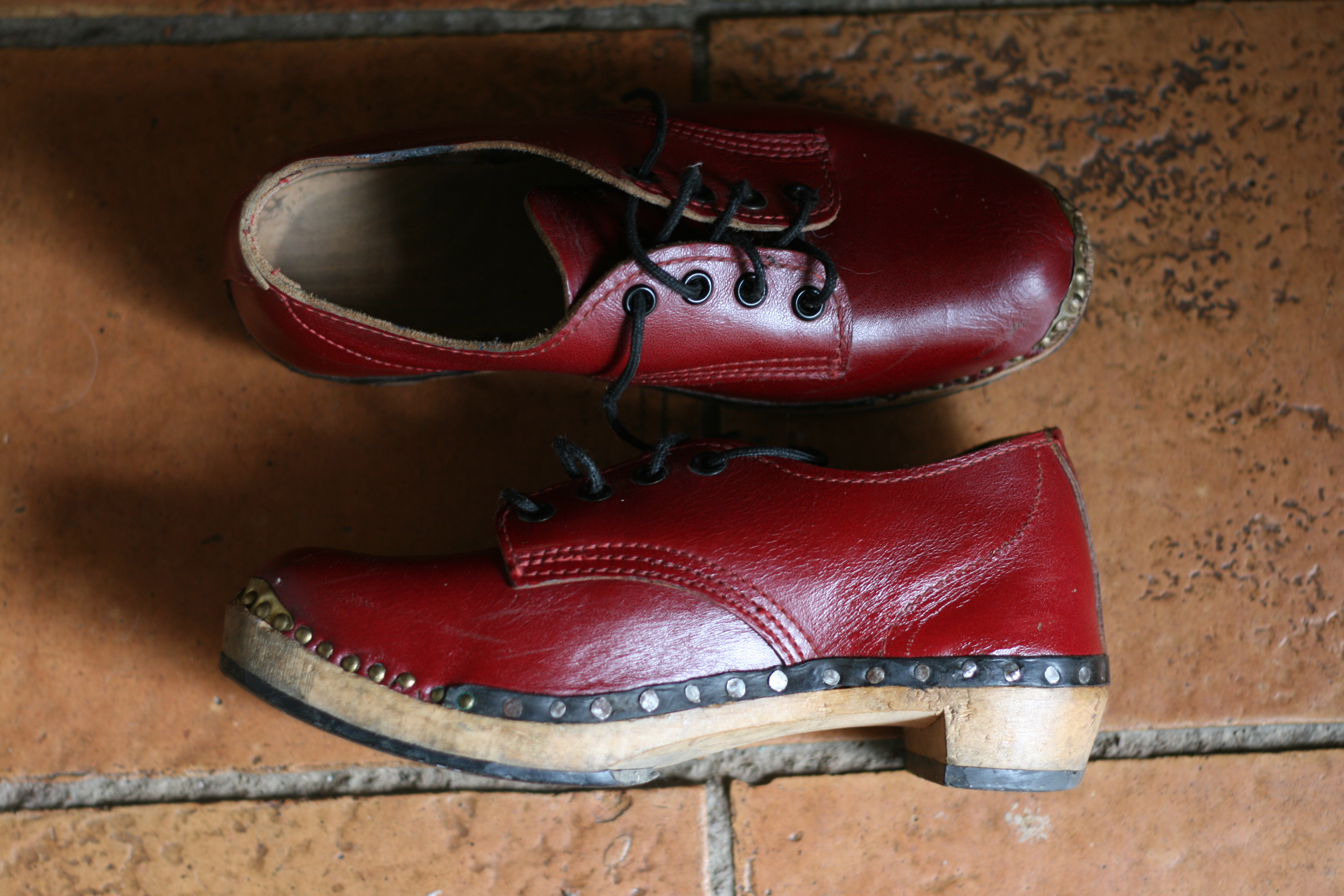
English clog from the United Kingdom

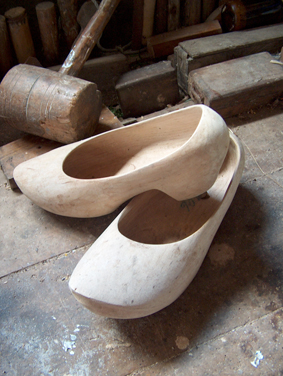
Galician zocas

=== Traditional Asian clogs ===
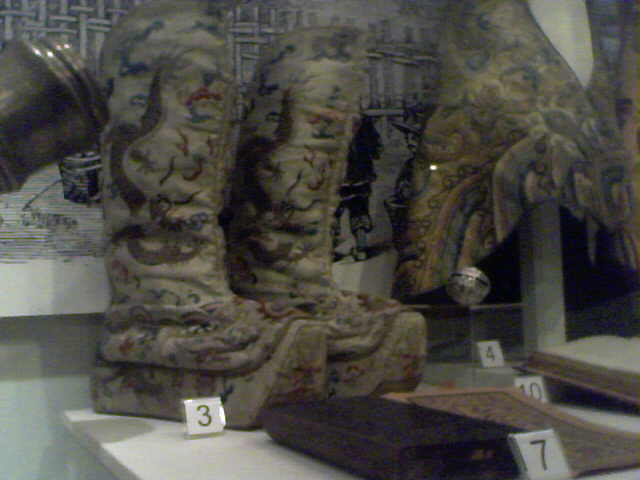
Tai-Ping boots from China

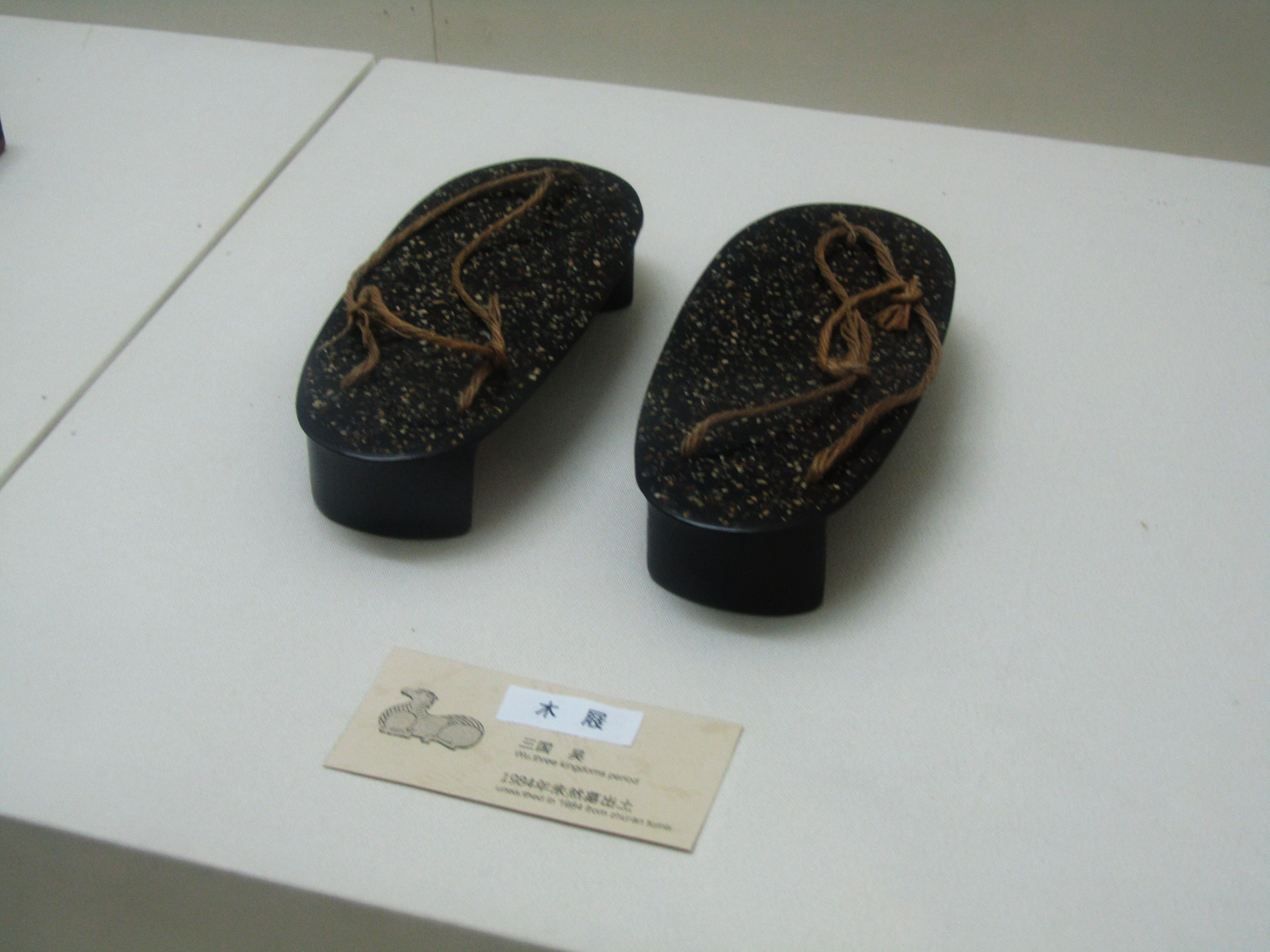
Ji from China

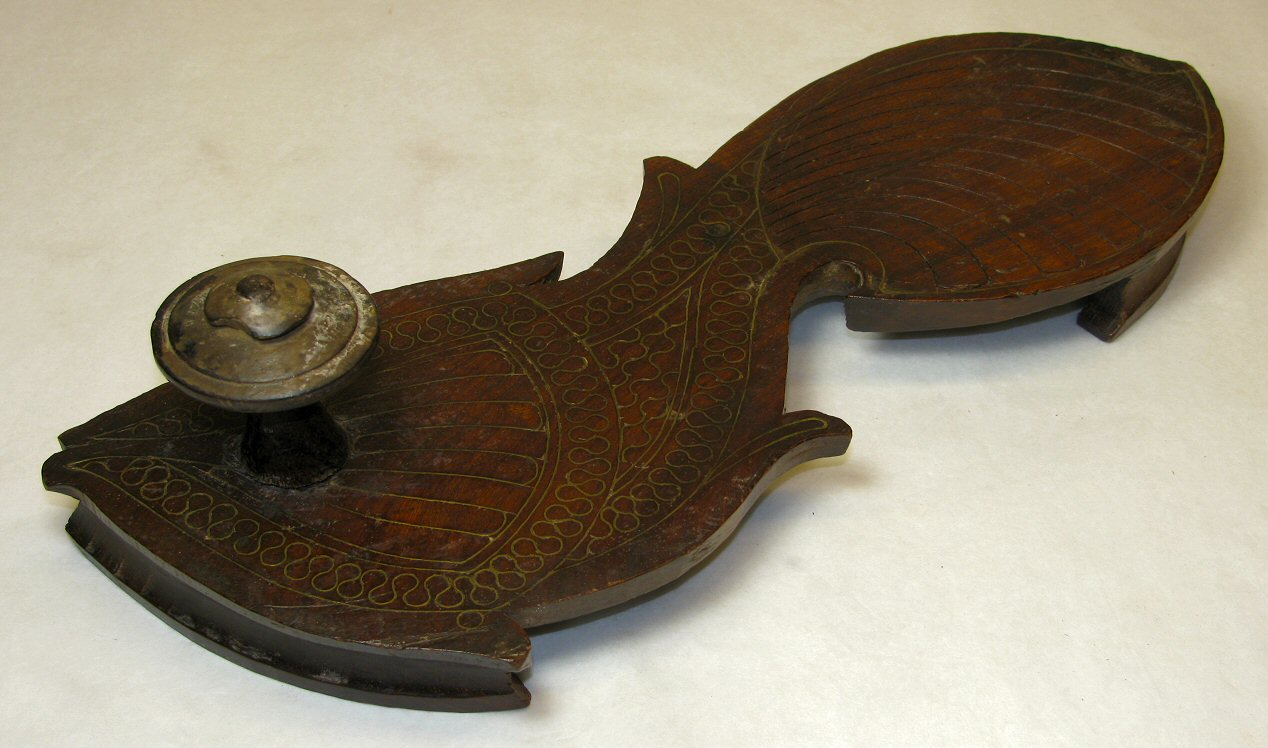
Paduka from India

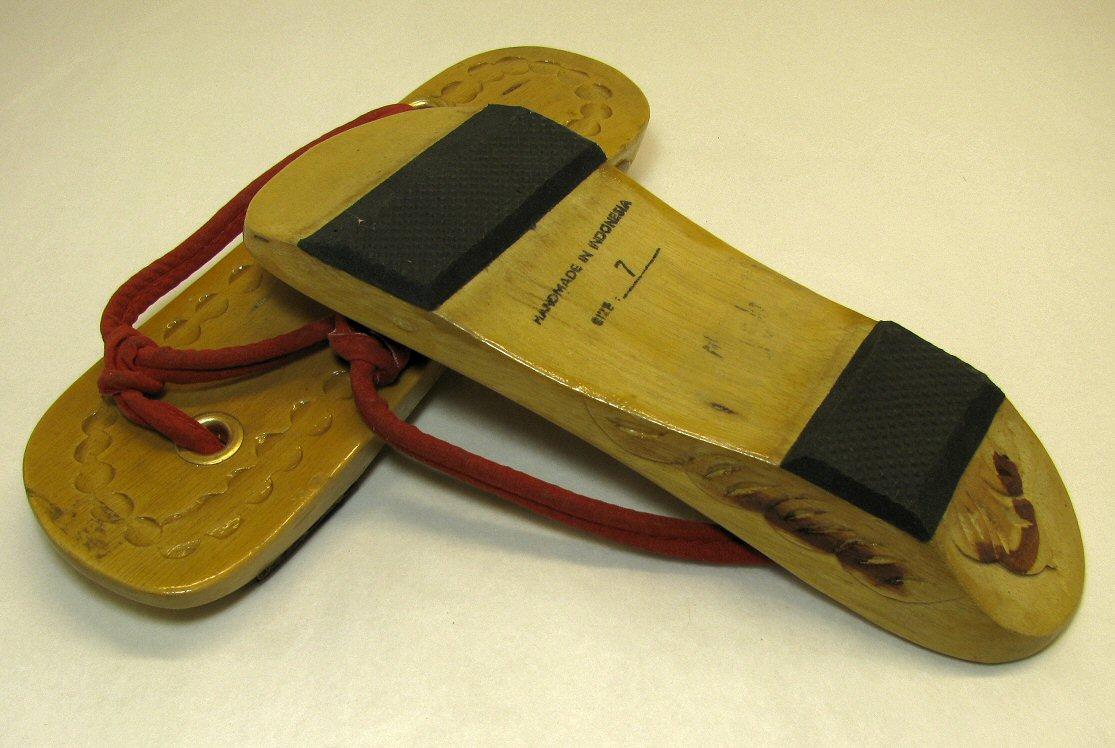
Bakiak from Indonesia

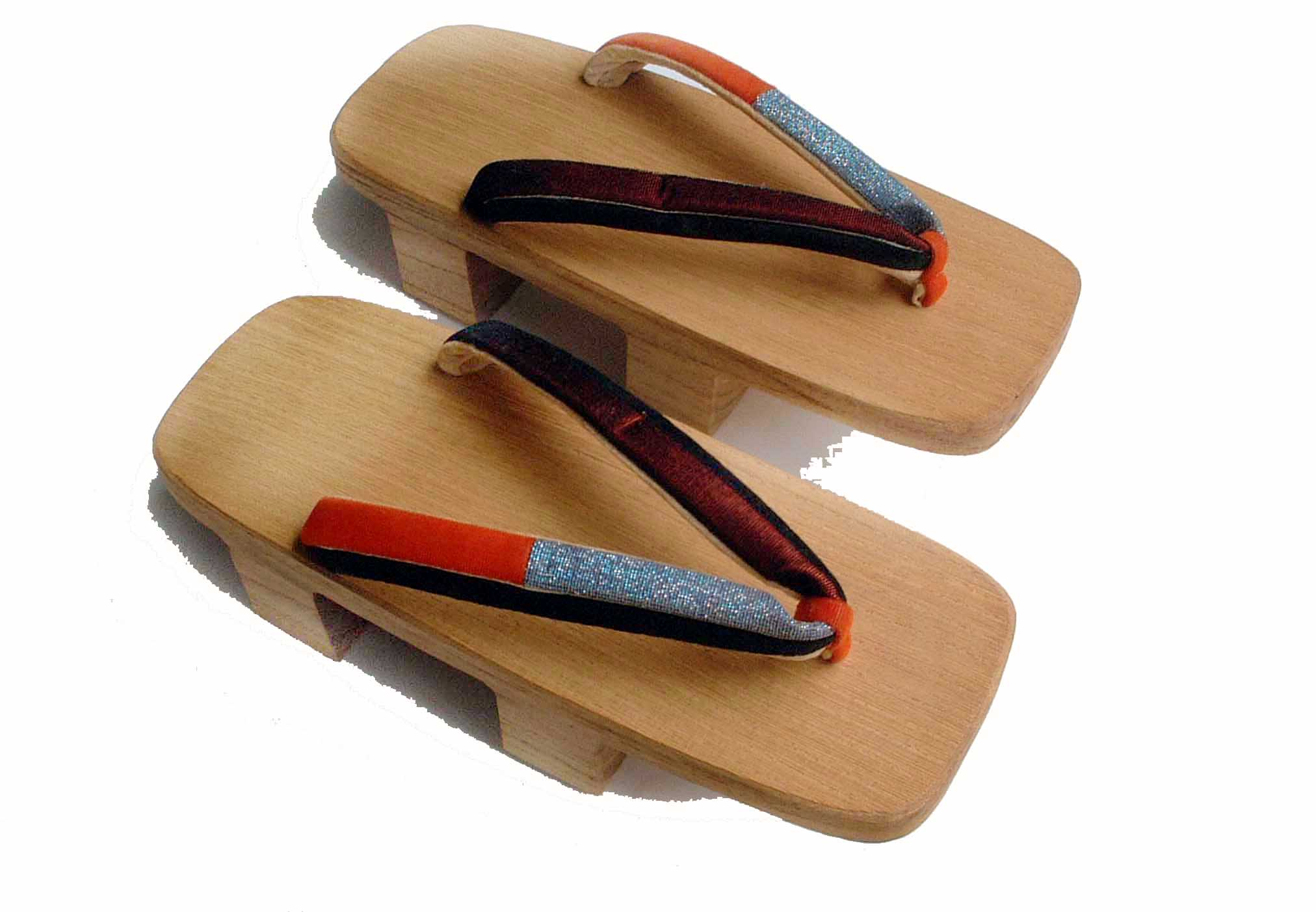
Geta from Japan

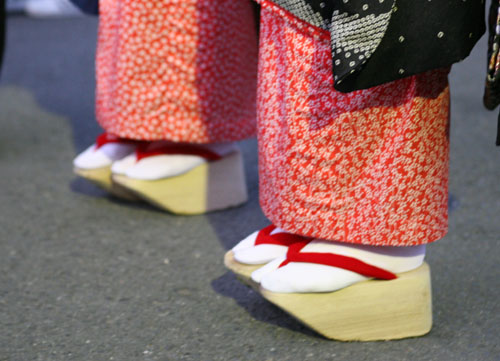
Okobo from Japan

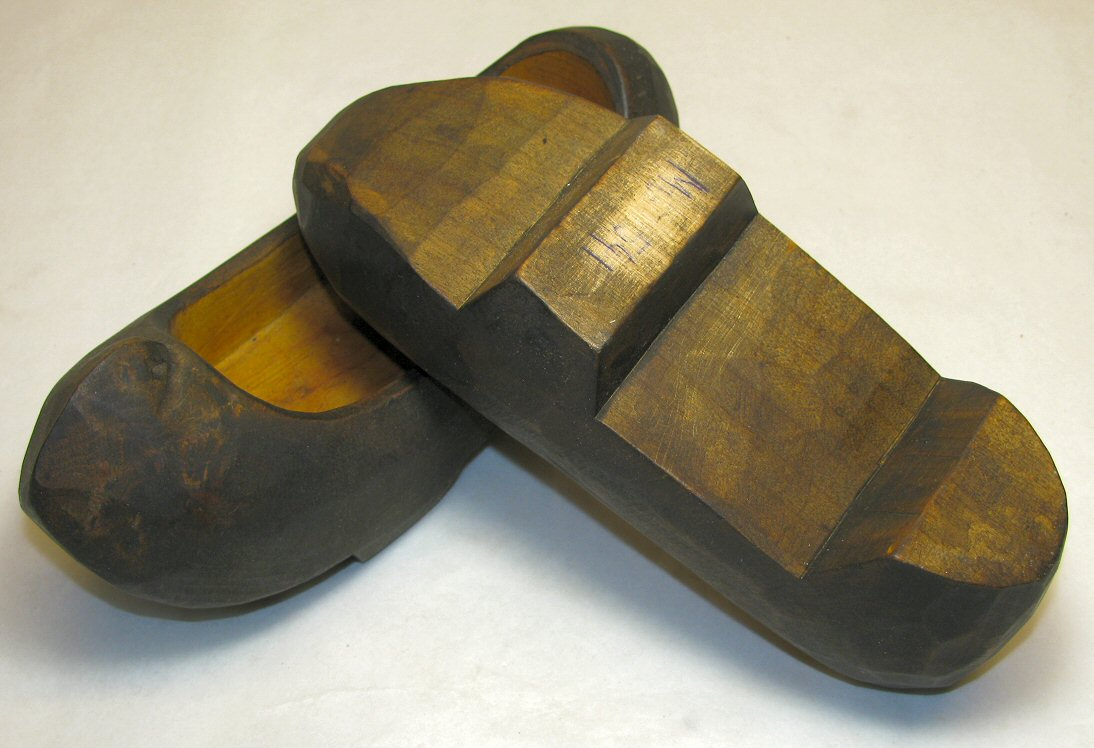
Namaksin from Korea

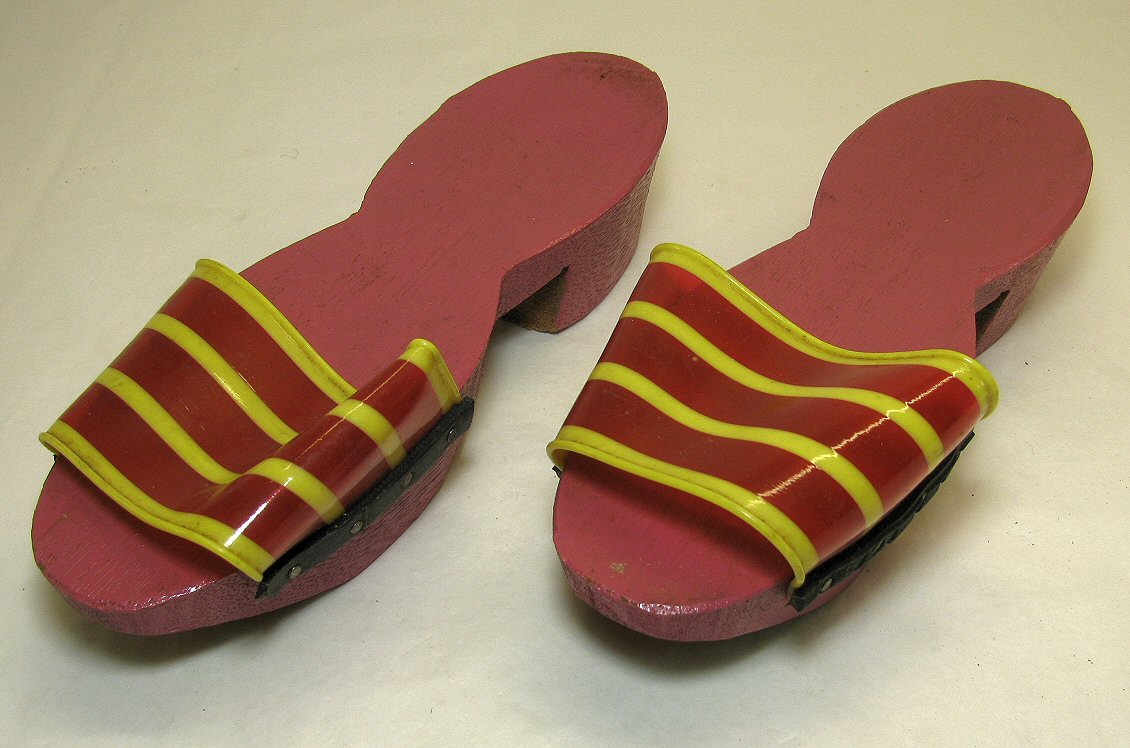
Terompah from Malaysia

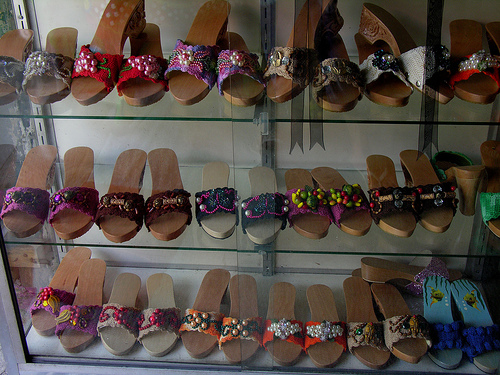
Bakya from the Philippines

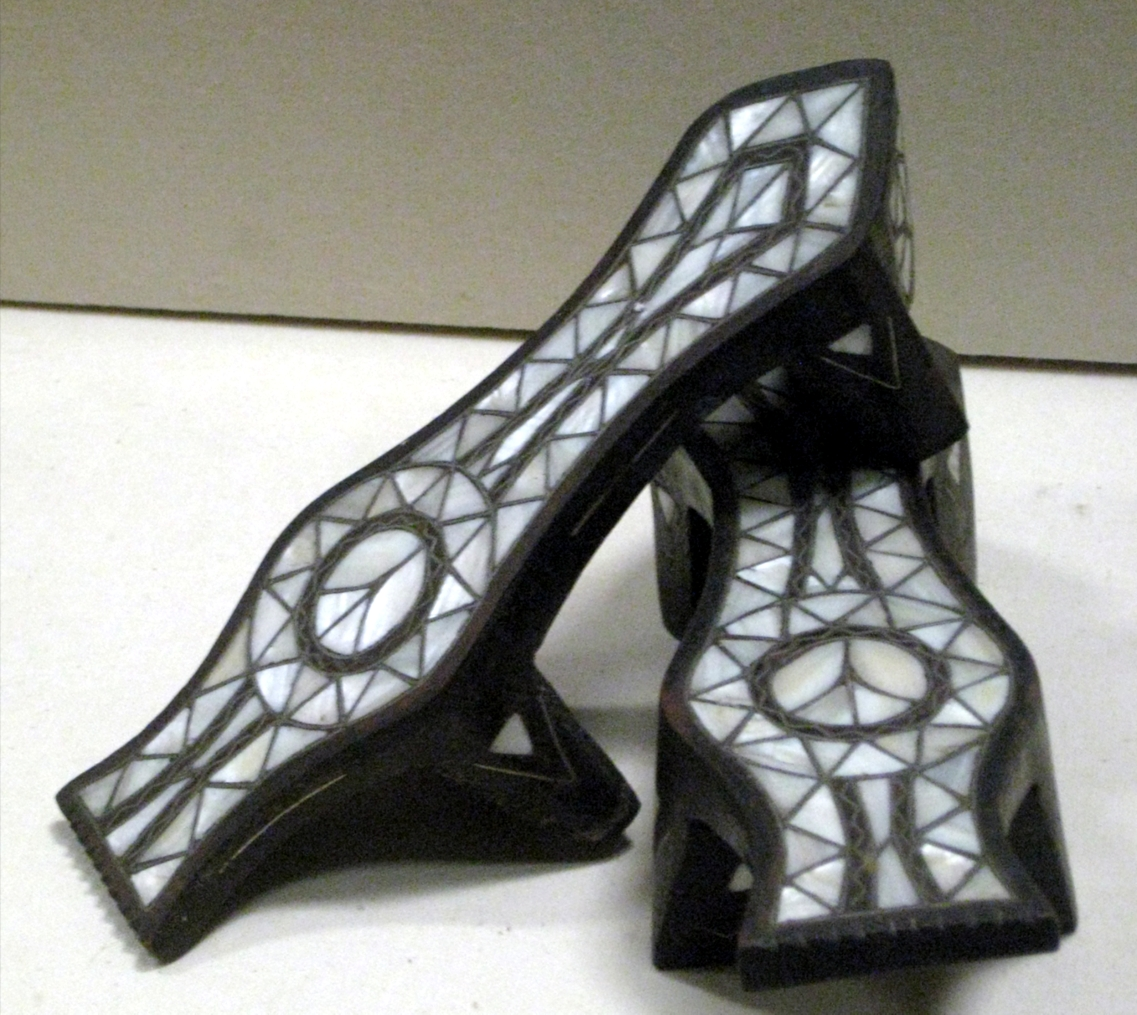
Nalin from Turkey

== Fashion clogs ==
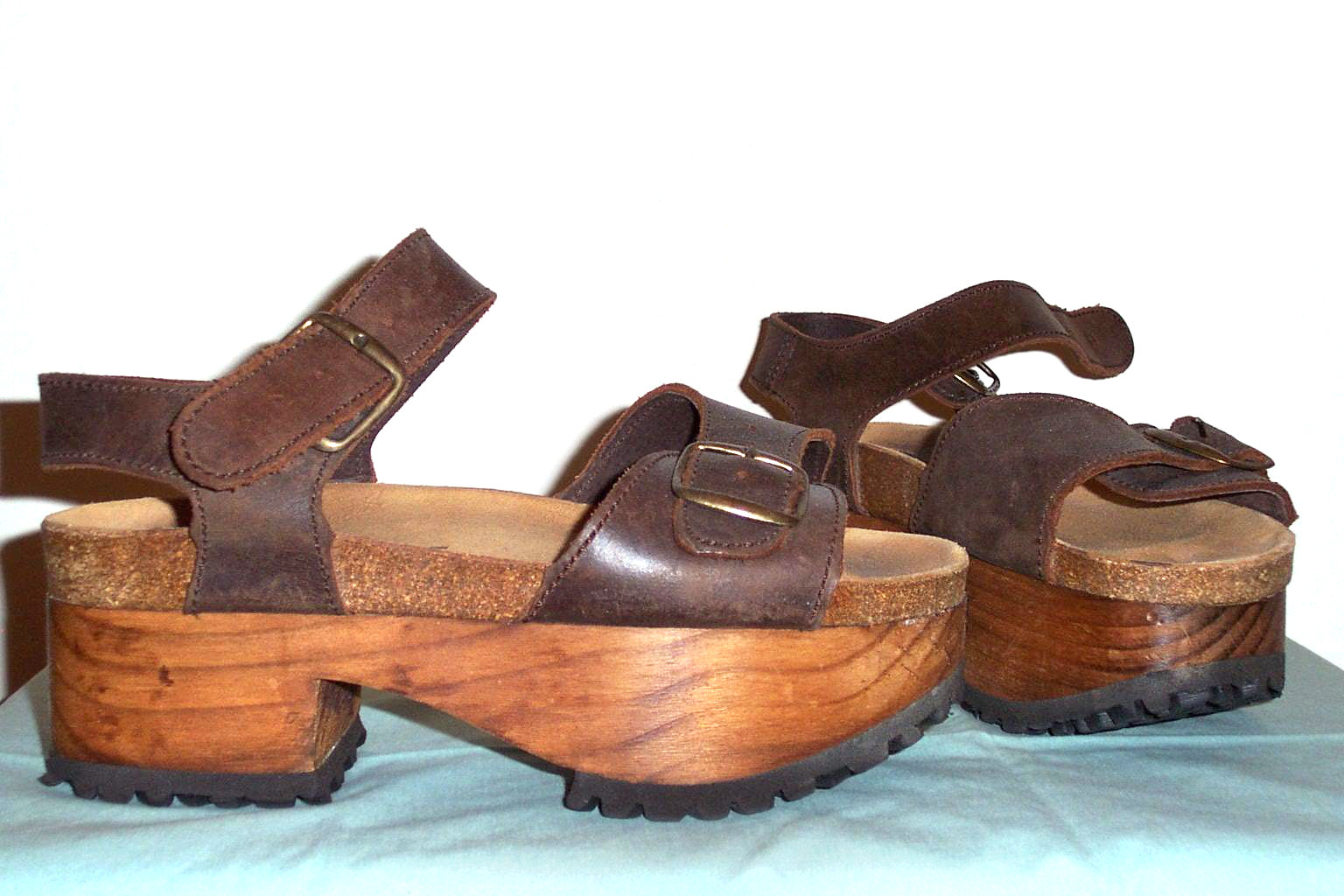
Platform-sandal clog, with cork insole and rubber sole

In the 1970s and 1980s, Swedish clogs became popular fashion accessories for both sexes. They were usually worn without socks and were considered suitable attire for the avant-garde man.

In the 1980s and 1990s, clogs based on Swedish clogs returned in fashion for women. Platform clogs or sandals, often raised as high as 6 or even 8 inches right through between sole and insole, were worn in many western countries. The large mid layer was often made of solid cork, although some were merely of plastic with a cork covering. The sole, more often than not, was made of a light sandy-colored rubber.

In 2007, Dutch designers Viktor & Rolf introduced high-heeled Dutch klompen on the catwalk, with their winter collection of 2007/08. In 2010, Swedish clogs for women returned again in Chanel's and Louis Vuitton's Spring / Summer 2010 collection.

== Museums ==
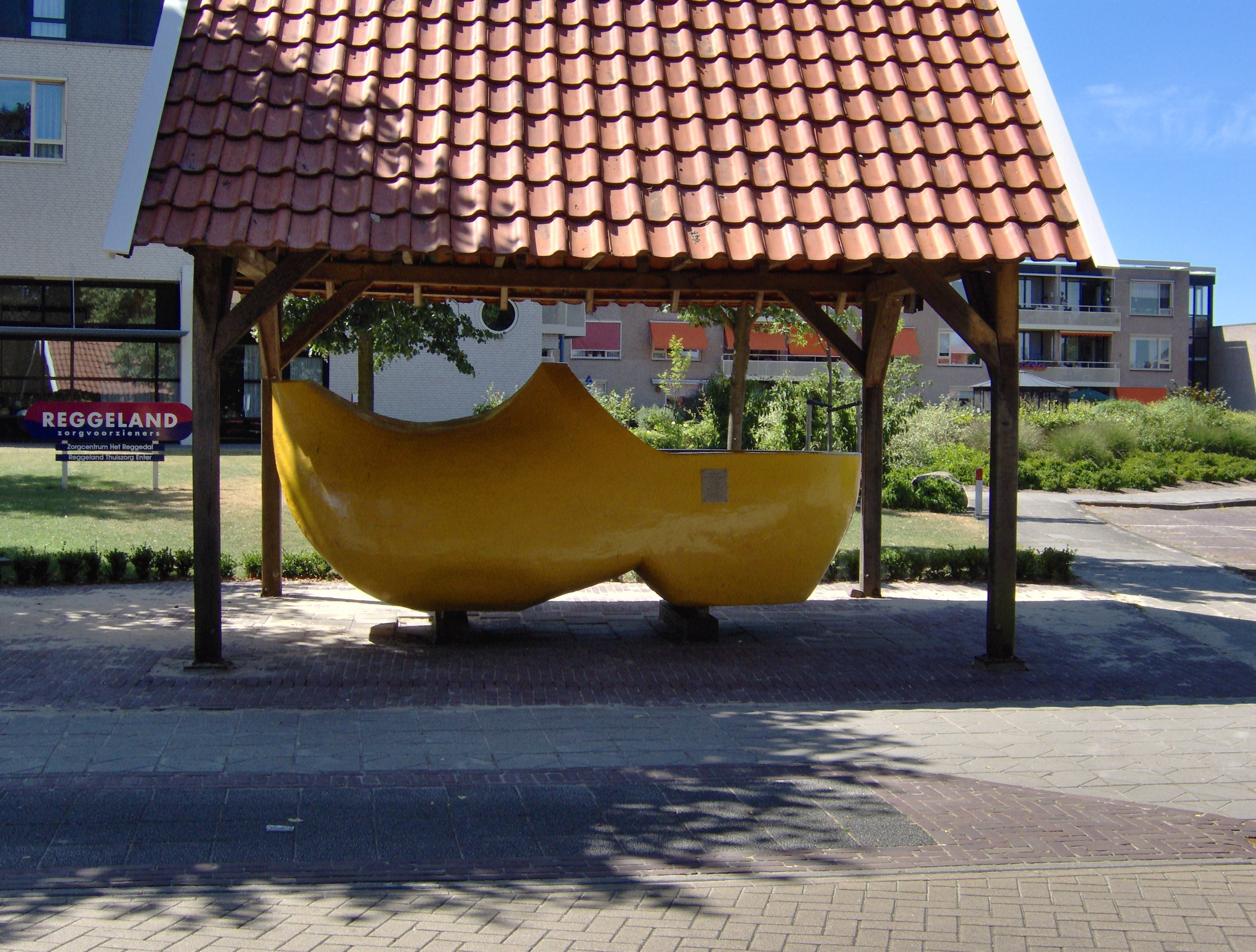
World's biggest clog from one piece of wood, in Enter (Netherlands)

- Bata Shoe Museum, Canada
- International Wooden Shoe Museum Eelde, Netherlands
- Scherjon's Klompenmakerij en Museum, Netherlands
- Bai Mi Wooden Clog Village, Taiwan
- Clitheroe Castle Museum, Lancashire, UK

== See also ==
- List of shoe styles

== Sources ==
- De Boer-Olij, T. (2002), European Wooden Shoes. Their History and Diversity, Stichting Klompenmuseum Gebr. Wietzes, ISBN 90-901544-7-7
- De Greef, J. (27 February 2007), Hollands glorie bij Viktor & Rolf
- Dykes, D. P., Clogs: women's shoe trend, archived from the original on 27 December 2019
- Cochran, Lindsey (28 March 2010), "Before Chanel Clogs...There Was Viktor and Rolf", Every Clog has its Day, archived from the original on 22 January 2013
- Grew, F.; De Neergaard, M. (2004), Shoes and Pattens: Finds from Medieval Excavations in London, Boydell & Brewer, ISBN 0-85115-838-2
- "clog". Oxford English Dictionary (online ed.). Oxford University Press. (Subscription or participating institution membership required.)
- Owen, Trefor (21 April 2012), CPRW article
- "Baimi Clogs Village". Trip Advisor.
- Wiedijk, F. (2000), Wooden Shoes of Holland, Kooijman Souvenirs & Gifts, ISBN 90-71816-12-5
