= Träskor =

Type of clog from Sweden

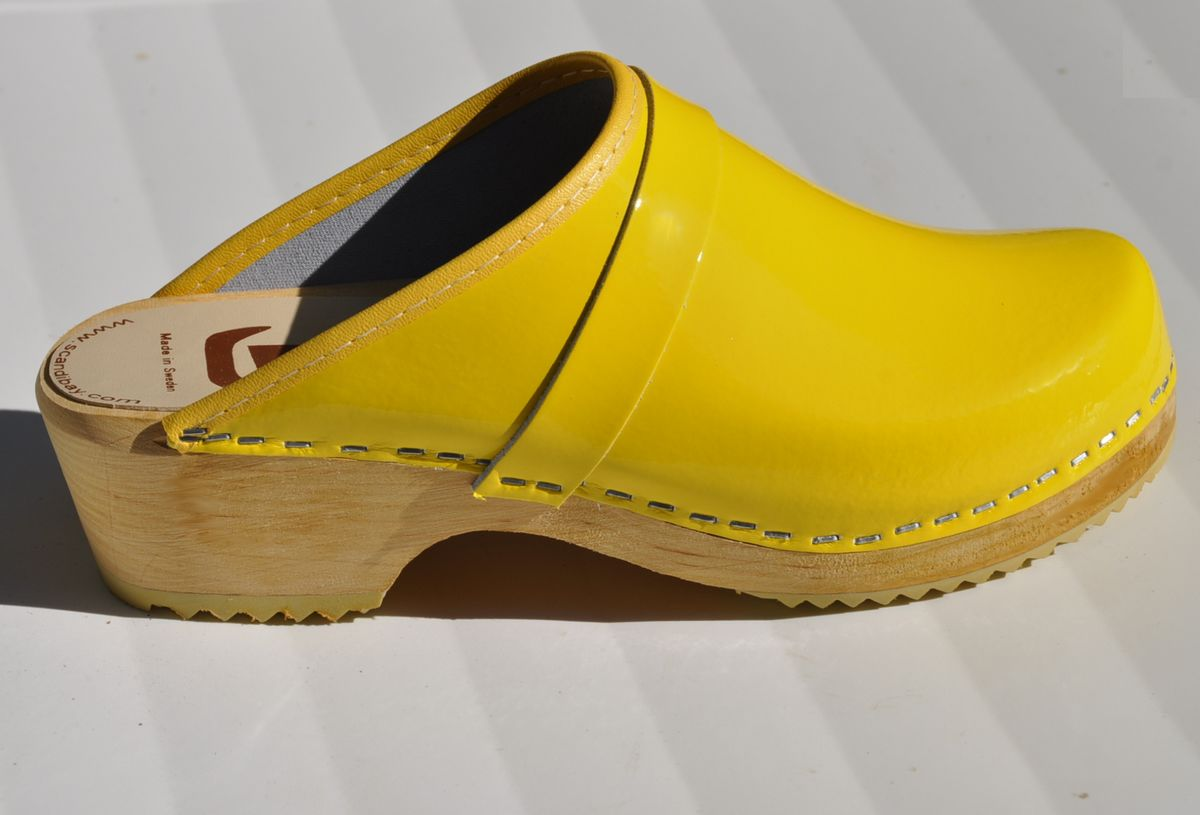
Träsko with leather upper.

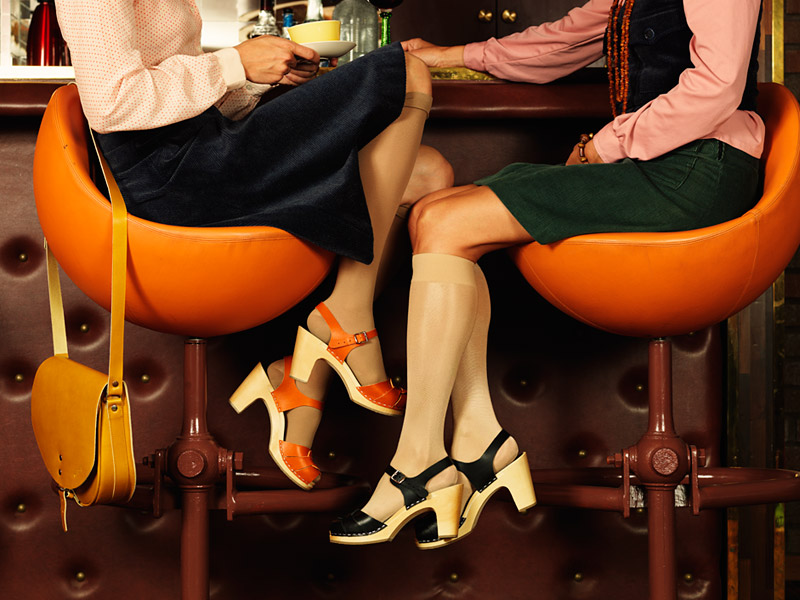
Träskor made by Swedish Hasbeens

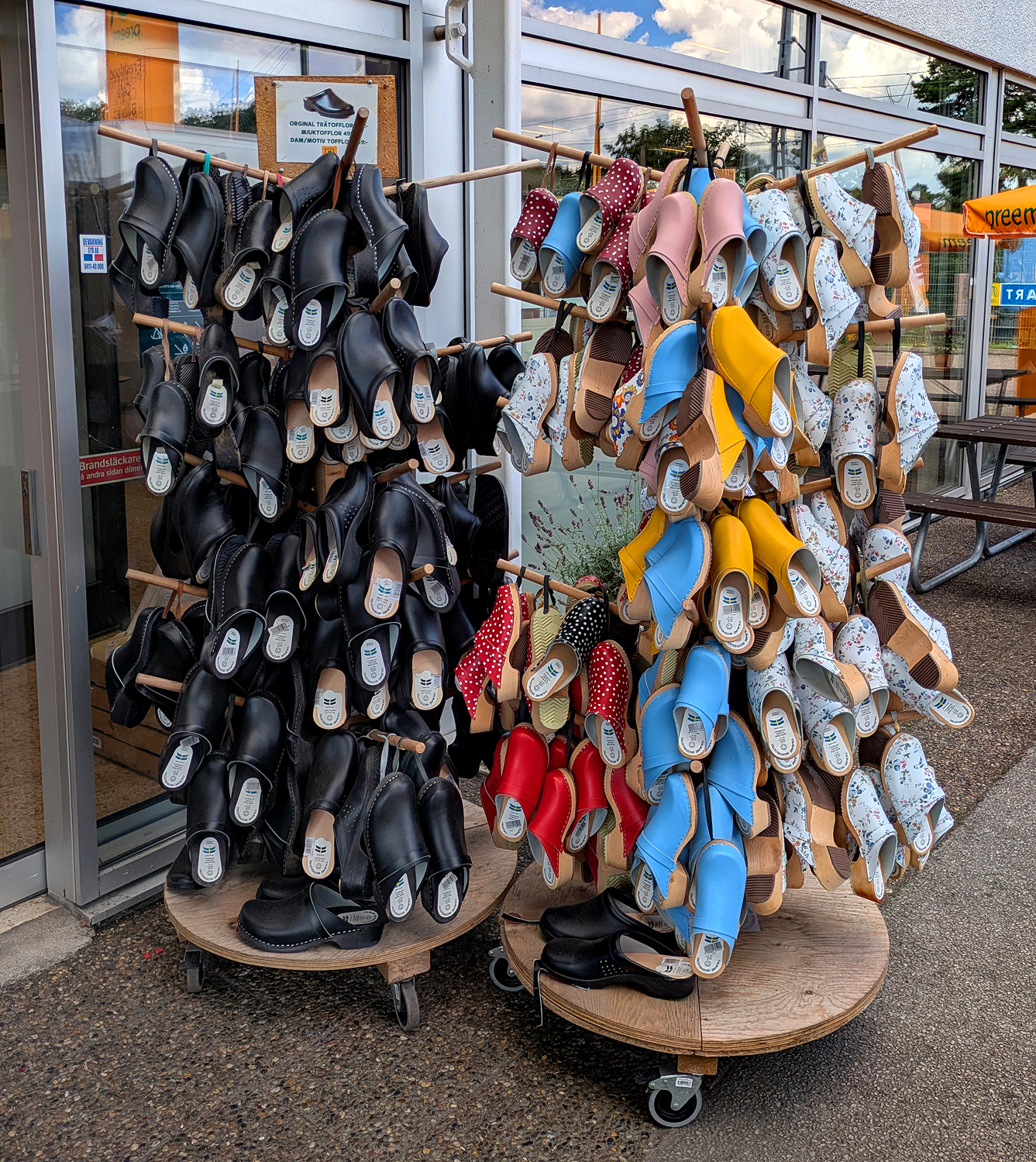
Träskor in different colors and sizes for sale at a gas station in Ystad 2026.

Träskor are Swedish clogs typically made from alder, but sometimes birch or pine. Clogs are mainly manufactured in the southern part of the country, both as handicrafts and in factories. In 1905 there were 22 factories employing 241 people. One manufacturer is based in Vollsjö in Skåne; therefore, clogs for business use are branded "Vollsjö slippers." Other notable manufacturers of clogs include Lotta, Troentorp and Swedish Hasbeens.

The most common model in Sweden is one with soles made of wood and uppers of leather. Older models are usually entirely of wood, painted to mimic leather or sometimes richly painted with floral motifs.

== See also ==
- List of shoe styles
