= Cantabrian albarcas =

Wooden shoe

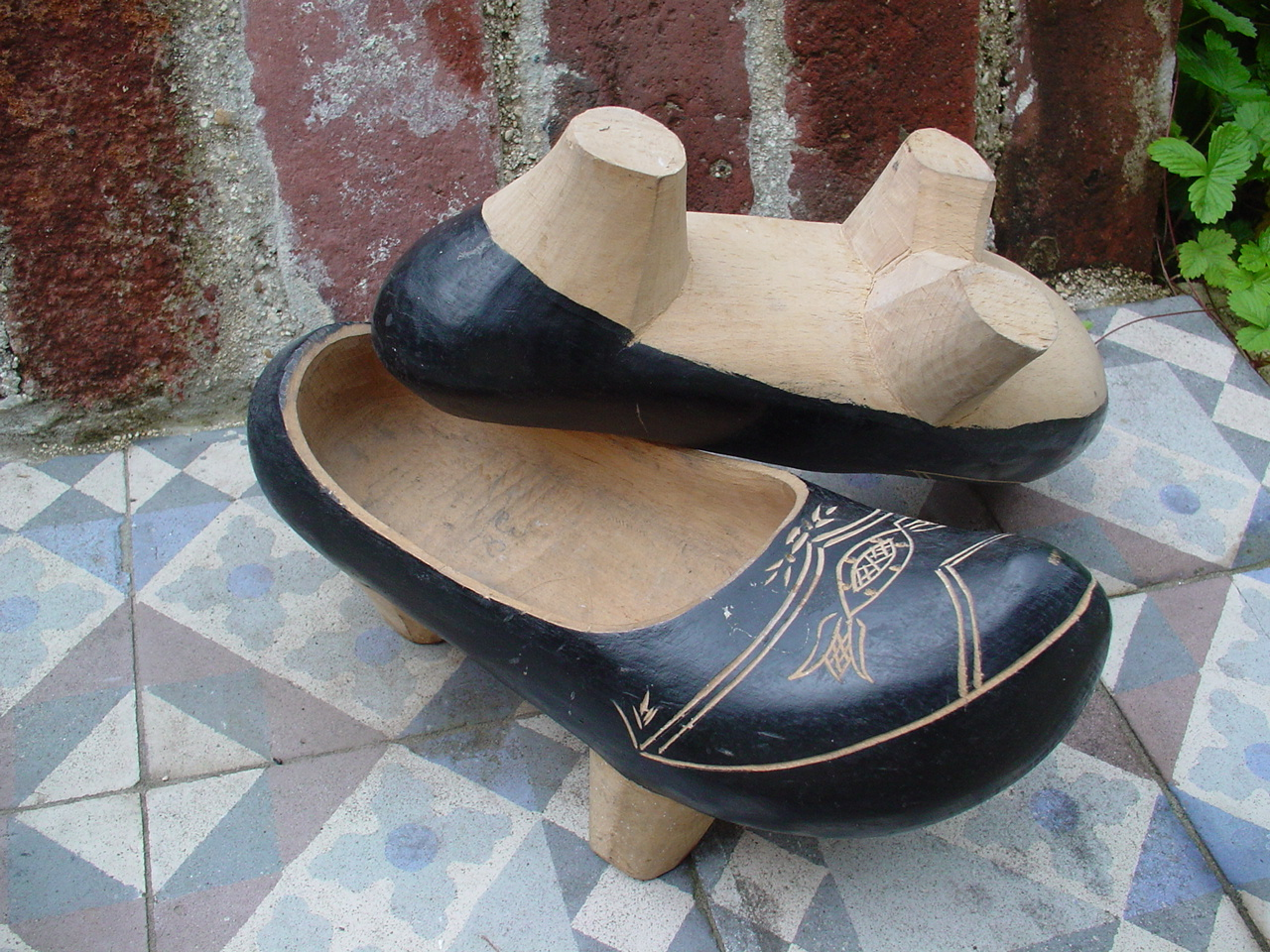
- Cantabrian albarcas coloured in black
- Type: Clog
- Material: Wood
- Place of origin: Cantabria, Spain

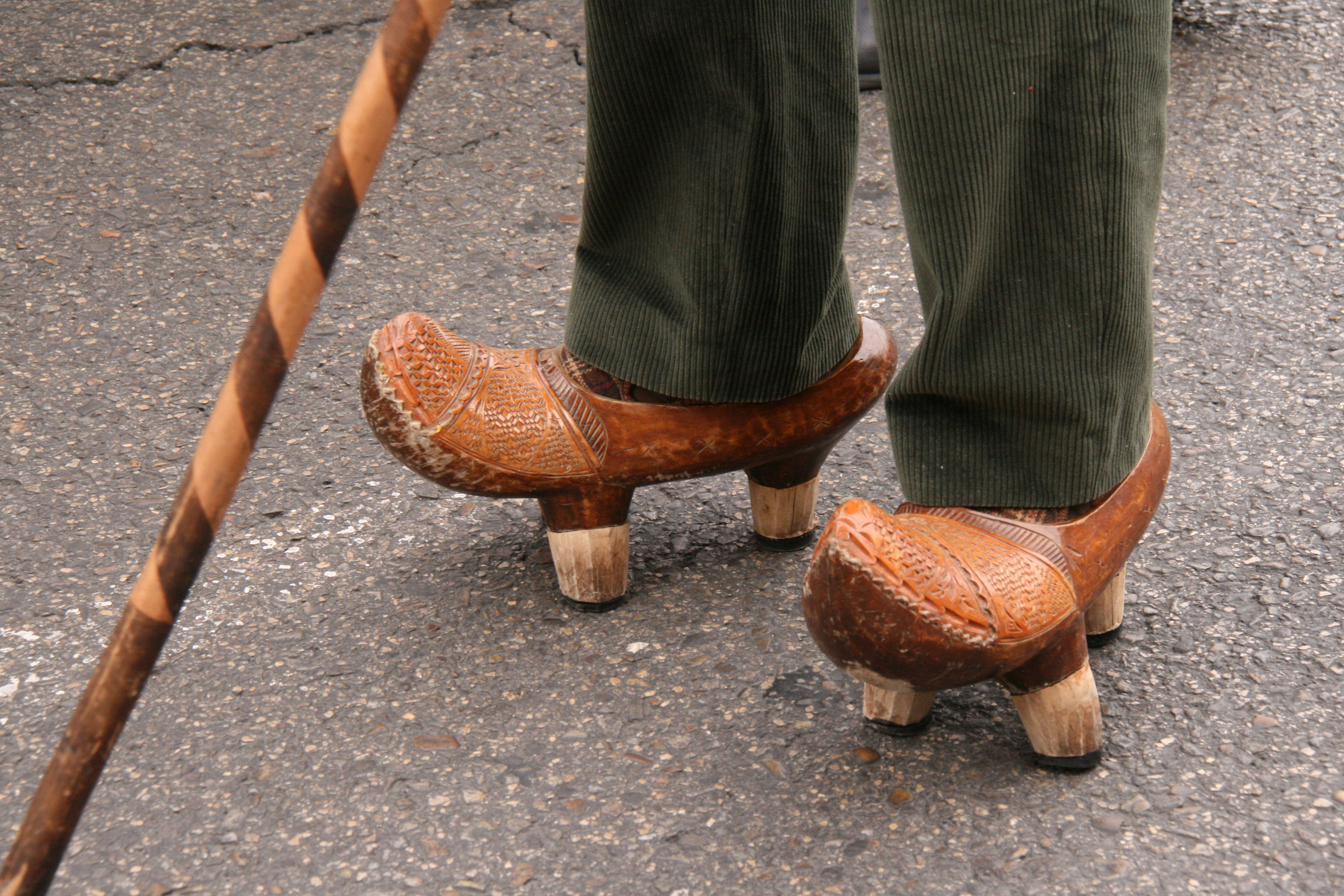
Albarcas

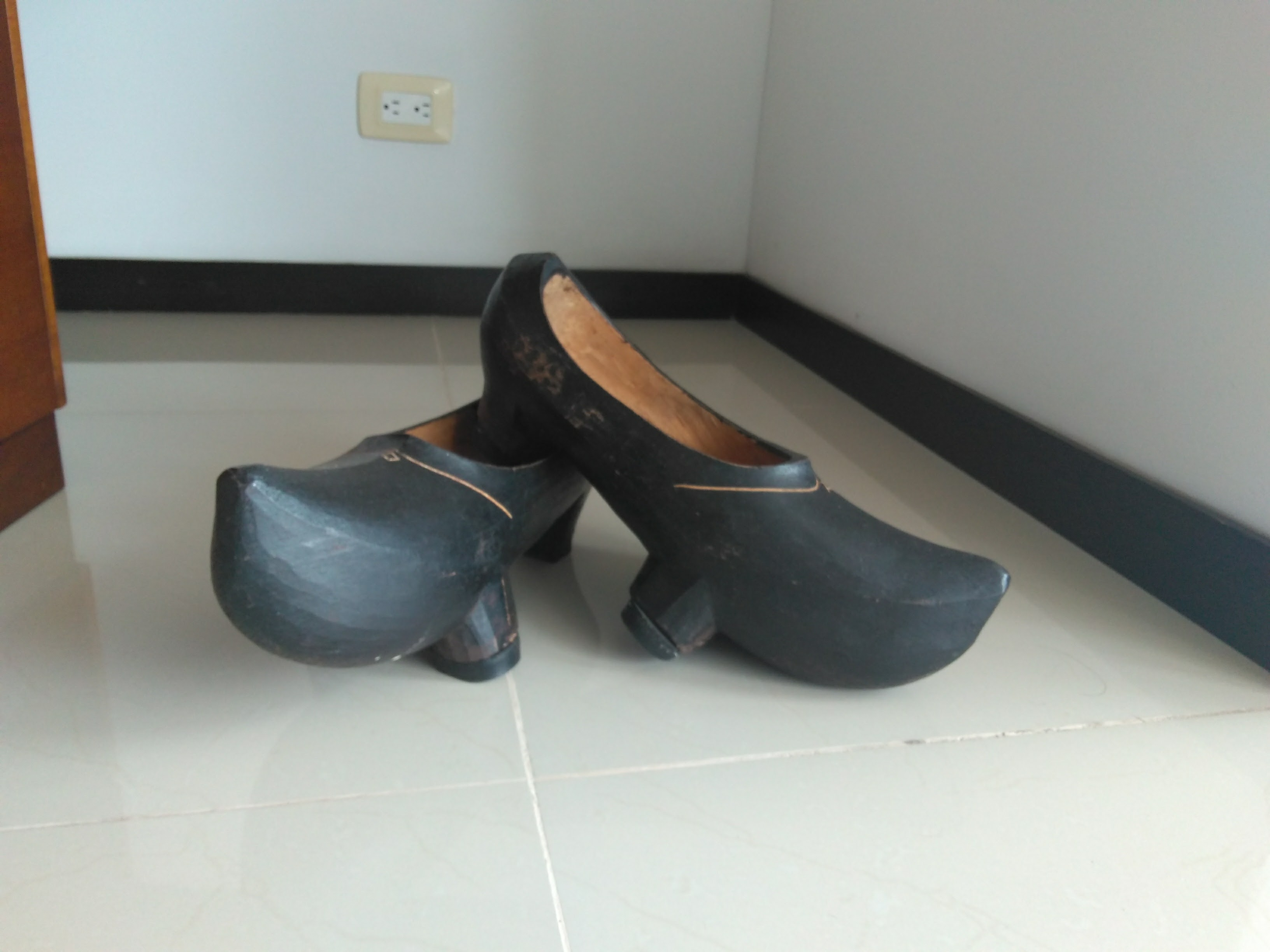
Asturian madreñas

A Cantabrian albarca is a rustic wooden shoe in one piece, which has been used particularly by the peasants of Cantabria, Spain. In the neighbouring province of Asturias madreñas are still being widely used in rural areas.

Cantabrian albarcas are similar to other clogs from Europe, but have significant features and different characteristics in terms of woodworking process and in their use. They have a characteristic set of three dowels on the bottom of the shoe.

== History ==
The beginning of the use of this footwear in the northern regions of Spain (especially in Cantabria) is unknown, but it is already mentioned in a document from 1657, in which King Philip IV requested the Pope to create the Diocese of Santander. In the Cadastre of the Marquis of La Ensenada, in 1752, the profession of albarquero is recorded in several villages in the western part of Cantabria.

Given the humid climate of the area, it is a very appropriate footwear to protect the feet from water and dirt on the ground from certain tasks carried out in the stable, in the meadows and on the farmland. It is practical for walking on rough terrain, muddy ground, and snow, because the ‘tarugos’ or lower heels give elevation to the foot and lend agility to the gait.

Today, this traditional craft has been left to a few albarquero craftsmen, who only make albarcas to order, sometimes for use and sometimes as a typical souvenir of the Cantabrian region. Making the clogs by hand is being replaced by machines, in which a profile reader runs along the surface of the albarca to be reproduced and transports its reading, by means of a set of bars, to blades that cut the excess wood and achieve a perfect duplicate. These machine-made albarcas are the ones that can be bought today in shops, imported to Cantabria from other places.

Although the use of albarcas as footwear has become almost extinct, this has not prevented this typical footwear of the north from being considered a cultural and therefore tourist resource. This is how the albarca plays a role in the Saja-Nansa ecomuseum, as this footwear was typical of this region centuries ago. The Saja-Nansa eco-museum tries to care for and maintain these customs, as well as to conserve and present to new generations this set of heritage elements that aim to produce and communicate a certain knowledge. The Saja-Nansa ecomuseum is a place for the preservation of the albarca.

On the Children's Day of Cantabria, which is celebrated on the Magdalena in Santander, a collection of a hundred albarcas (from the Castro Valnera Cultural Association) was exhibited, which attracted more than 35,000 people.

As a result, the albarca is still present in various associations and festivals in Cantabria. The Castro Valnera Cultural Association is a good example of this, as it brought together a hundred albarcas, belonging to private collections, representative of all the Cantabrian regions in a unique exhibition that had a great impact, both in terms of the number of visitors and the interest shown. The event was attended by both the regional and national press. In an act of collaboration, on the Children's Day of Cantabria (a Festival of Regional Tourist Interest) held in Santander, the pieces that formed part of the exhibition were exhibited on the Magdalena peninsula so that they could be admired by more than 35,000 people. In 2006, the City Council of Cantabria organised an exhibition of the pieces that were part of the exhibition.

In 2006, the Town Council of Cartes (Cantabria) organised in Santiago de Cartes the day of the albarca, on the occasion of the festivities of San Cipriano (a festival of Regional Tourist Interest). In 2006, the exhibition was held in Santiago de Cartes (Cantabria).

== See also ==
- Geta (footwear)
- List of shoe styles
