= International Wooden Shoe Museum Eelde =

Coordinates: 53°8′17″N 6°34′7″E

The International Wooden Shoe Museum Eelde
- Dutch traditional clog making and trading, 1925
- Location: Eelde, the Netherlands
- Collections: Over 2,200 different pairs of wooden shoes and footwear with wooden soles from 43 countries.

The International Wooden Shoe Museum Eelde is a museum in Eelde, the Netherlands, for clogs, clog-making equipment and machinery. It has the largest collection of wooden footwear in the world.

== History ==
The collection had been put together by Eiso Wietzes (1916–1977) and Egbert Wietzes (1925–1988), two brothers, who were the last wooden shoe makers in Eelde. After their deaths, the collection was enlarged by the private collection of wooden shoes owned by H.P. Bongers, a teacher at the Technical College in Enschede. Besides wooden shoes, Bongers’ collection consisted of traditional and early industrial clog-making tools, from Western-Europe. In 2009 the museum acquired a large collection of French clogs.

== Collection ==
Among the museum's collection are:

- Over 2,200 different pairs of wooden shoes and footwear with wooden soles from 43 countries.
- Hundreds of pieces of clog-making equipment from seven European countries.
- Simple machinery dating from the 1920s, from the Netherlands, Germany and France.
- An extensive collection of international literature, including photographs.

The museum provides guided tours and thematic exhibitions are held regularly.
