= Namaksin =

Traditional Korean wooden shoes

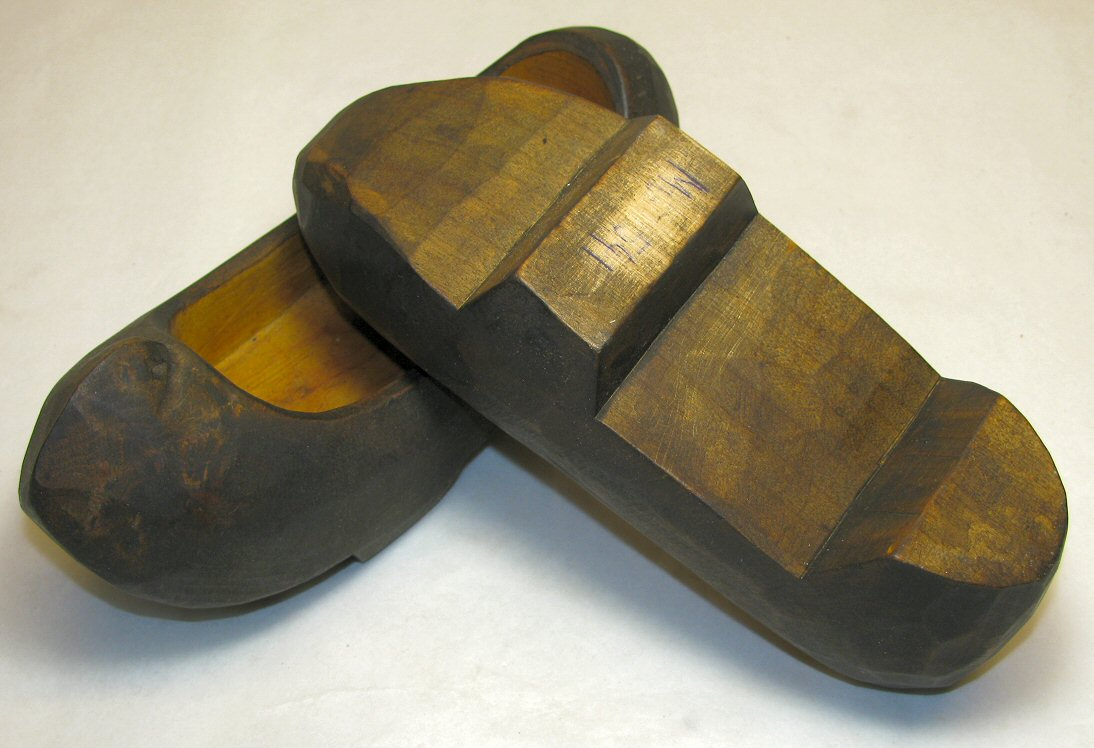
A pair of namaksin

Namaksin (Korean: 나막신) are traditional Korean wooden shoes made for wearing during muddy and rainy conditions.

There was a misconception that these traditional clogs came not from Asia but from the Netherlands in the past, but in reality, there had been clogs at least from Three Kingdoms period of Korea, which were similar to geta, Japanese clogs. Those namaksin were called "pyeonggeuk (平屐)". It is presumed that clogs of Baekje went to Japan, and it became the origin of geta.

Clogs in Baekje had three holes like geta, but clogs in Silla had five holes. How people tied its strings in that era is unclear. In the Three Kingdoms period, there were two types of clogs: open-toes shoes, and close-toes shoes. As time went by, the latter became primary as namaksin. These shoes were worn by Koreans of all ages and social positions, usually in the rainy seasons.

== See also ==
- List of shoe styles
