= Ballet boot =

Style of high-heeled footwear

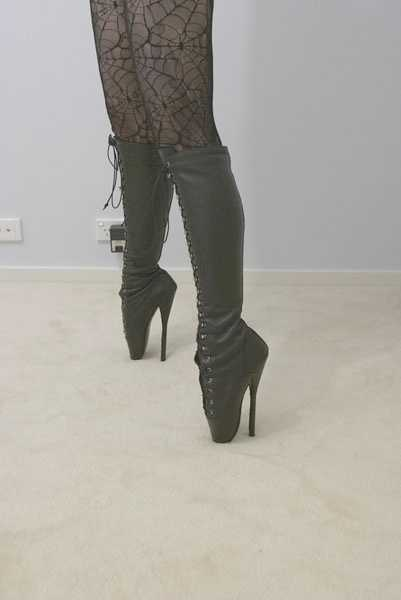
Knee-high ballet boots, impractical boots made expressly for their sexual appeal.

The ballet boot is a contemporary style of fetish footwear that merges the look of the pointe shoe with a high heel. The idea is to restrict the wearer's feet almost en pointe, like those of a ballerina, with the aid of long, slender heels (Dori shoes). When upright, the feet are held nearly vertical by the shoe, thus putting nearly all of the body's weight on the tips of the toes. However, a properly tight fit (firmly laced) will hold the shoe to the wearer's instep and heel, thereby reducing the weight on the wearer's toes.

== Construction ==
The heel height is usually 7 inches (18 centimetres) or more – it is as long as possible, so that the wearer's foot (ankle and toes) are fully pointed/extended in the shoe; any longer would prohibit standing or would require a platform. The boots may rise to any height on the leg. The knee-high and thigh-high versions may also have zippers (zips) to allow them to be donned and doffed more easily. The thigh-high versions may be designed to stop the leg being bent at the knee, further restricting mobility. There are also "ballet shoe" designs, including sandals, mules, and Mary Janes, many of which have buckles.

Some styles are equipped with supports similar to the toe box and shank of pointe shoes, though, unlike those of the pointe shoe, the structural design, construction, and integrity provide only limited mobility.

== History ==
Ballerinas first danced en pointe in the Romantic era, with the first recorded performance in 1832 by Marie Taglioni, in La Sylphide. The soft satin slippers that were used took many decades to develop into the stiff-tipped pointe shoes that we have come to recognize in the 20th and 21st centuries, which allow for a greater range of virtuosic technique. Aside from the ballet pointe shoe, Viennese fetish boots (circa 1900) are another common ancestor to ballet boots and shoes, which sported a dramatic 11-inch (28-centimetre) heel; the heel was longer than the sole of the shoe, thus making standing and walking impossible. Having become more popular since the 1980s, ballet boots and shoes are now available worldwide.

== Usage ==
Ballet boots, unlike shoes, are often used for walking by those with practice. Despite the perception that ballet boots are only used for sexual purposes, they have been shown in pop culture and in the fashion industry. The ballet heels used for walking are of a much higher quality than those that are used primarily for fetish wear. Ballet boots of low quality are not intended for prolonged standing or walking, often they cannot be used for standing at all, nor are they functional for dancing. Instead, they act as a fetish object for sexual gratification, heightening the erotic appeal with the elements of bondage and submission. They are thus sometimes used in BDSM play. The boots, however, can cause enough discomfort by themselves: shortly after they are donned, the calves often begin to cramp and sting from overexertion if the wearer is not used to them. Beginners often find momentary walking or standing in them to be difficult and painful, which may also appeal to masochists. Arch-training devices and techniques are sometimes used to increase the wearer's instep in order to fit high heels such as these.

== See also ==
- List of shoe styles
- Boot fetishism
