= Fashion boot =

Boot worn for style rather for utilitarian purposes

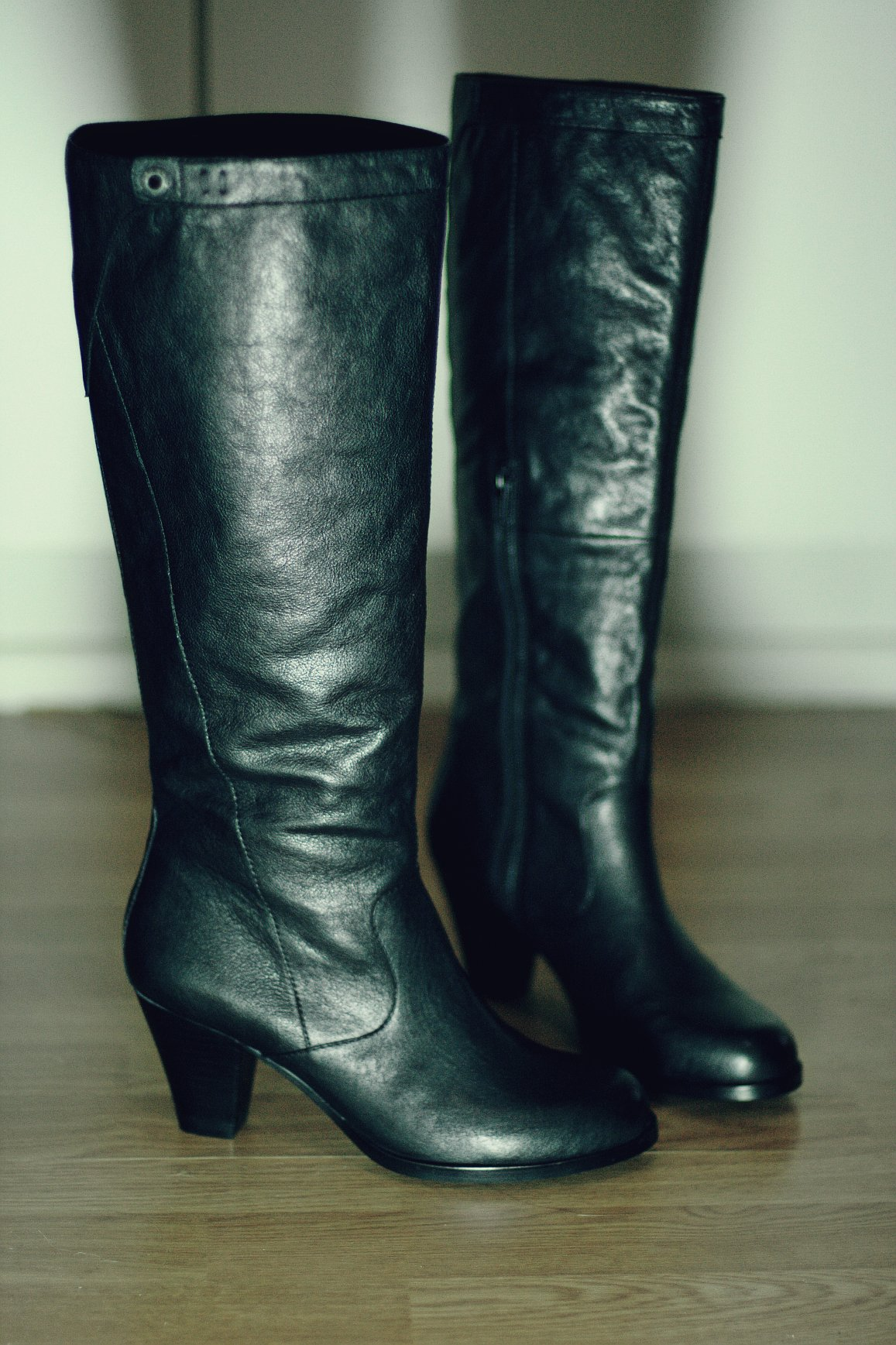
A pair of women's heeled knee-high boots

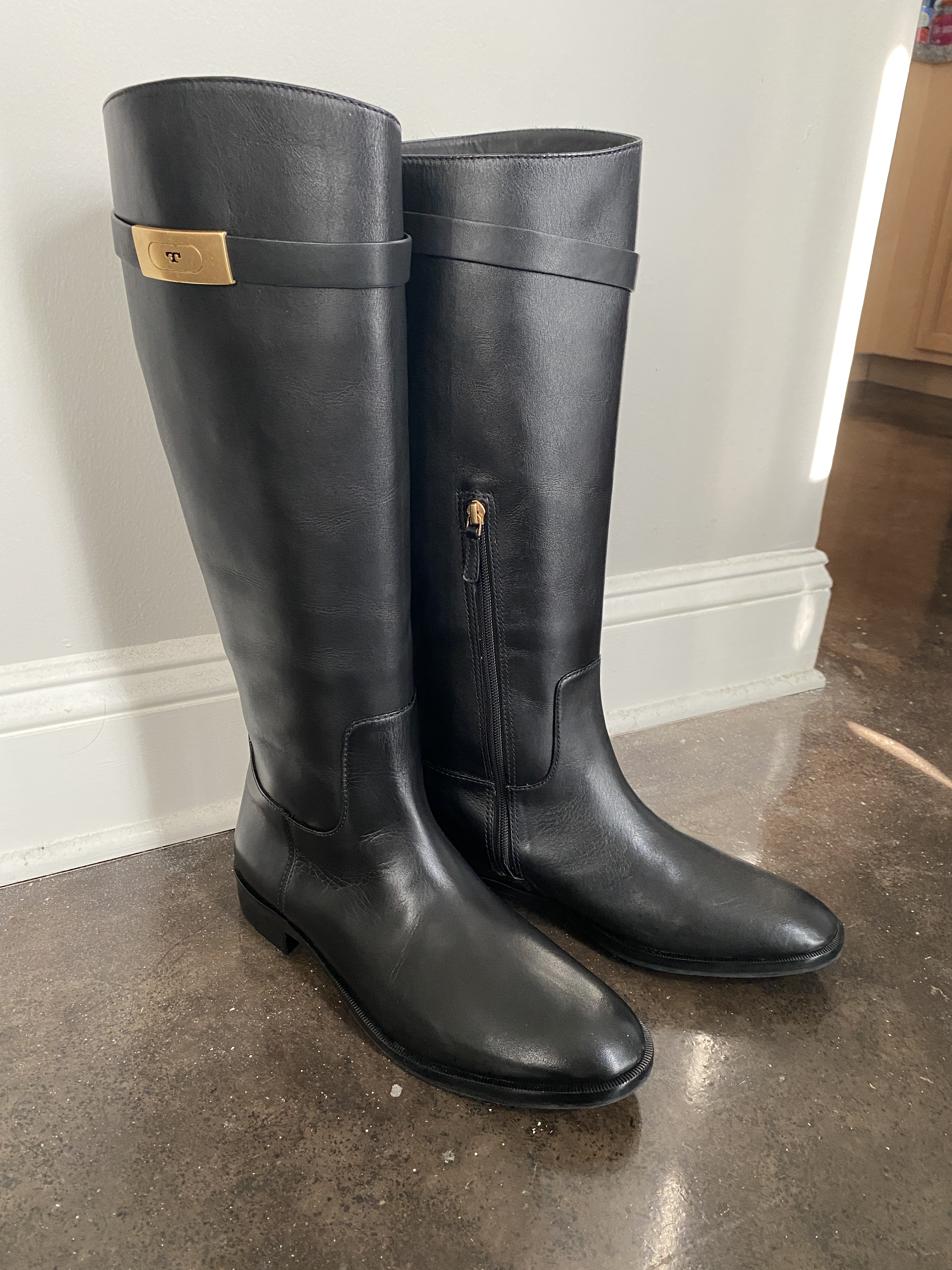
A pair of knee-high leather boots from Tory Burch LLC.

A fashion boot is a boot worn for reasons of style or fashion (rather than for utilitarian purposes – e.g. not hiking boots, riding boots, rain boots, etc.). The term is usually applied to women's boots. Fashion boots come in a wide variety of styles, from ankle to thigh-length, and are used for casual, formal, and business attire. Although boots were a popular style of women's footwear in the 19th century, they were not recognized as a high fashion item until the 1960s. They became widely popular in the 1970s and have remained a staple of women's winter wardrobes, but have declined in popularity in the 2000's.

== History ==
=== Pre-1960s ===
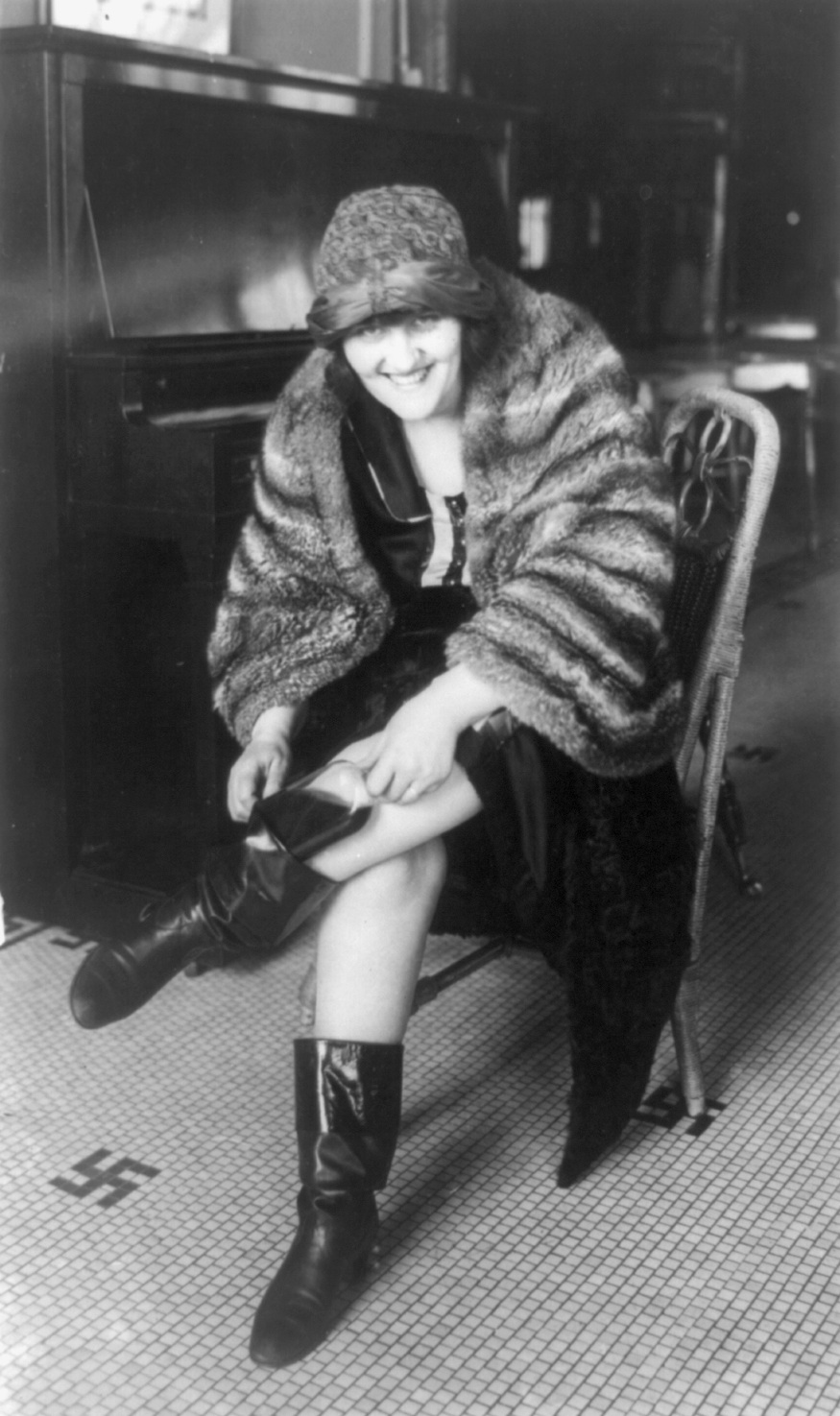
Woman wearing calf-length "Russian boots", 1922

In the 19th and early 20th centuries, ankle and calf-length boots were common footwear for women. Rising hemlines made longer styles of boots popular. In 1913, Denise Poiret, the wife of celebrated French couturier Paul Poiret, caused a sensation in Paris and New York by wearing knee-length boots in wrinkled Morocco leather. Designed by her husband, made by the bottier Favereau, and styled with a low heel and a square toe, she had versions in red, white, green, and yellow. By 1915 The New York Times was reporting that, inspired by Mme Poiret, women had adopted these "Russian boots" as an acceptable alternative to baring ankles and calves. By the 1920s Russian boots were available in a variety of styles, calf- or knee-length, with a Cuban or Louis heel, which could be pull-on, or zip-fastened for a closer fit. Worn with knee-length skirts, they often featured decorative features such as elaborate stitching or fur trims.

Russian boots were popular during the 1920s and the emergence of these tall boots for women was interpreted by some contemporary writers as a consequence of women's transition from the "leisure class" to the world of business. But as their popularity grew, concerns over quality meant that where protection from the elements was needed, Russian boots were increasingly replaced by fashionable variants of the rubber Wellington boot. As roads were surfaced and horse-drawn transport gave way to the motor engine, the additional protection provided by boots was no longer needed. Boots were seen as restrictive and uncomfortable when compared with the new styles of fashionable shoe that complimented a more streamlined and simplified look for women's clothing. Although they were still popular as late as the beginning of the 1930s, within a few years Russian boots had fallen out of favor.

During the late 1940s, women's ankle boots were occasionally worn, and boot choices expanded briefly in 1948. For fall of 1948, Perugia and Casale produced boots that ranged in height from ankle to calf for several Paris couture houses, including the most prominent of the time, Christian Dior. Dior's 1947 debut collection had popularized a voluptuous, Edwardian-influenced mode and these 1948 boots may have been inspired by the prevalence of women's boots during the Edwardian period. Some of the ones Perugia made for Schiaparelli met the hem of her calf-length skirts and fit sleekly on the leg. Roger Vivier for Delman also presented ankle boots at the time, continuing to show them into 1949. Though extensively presented during that brief period and perfectly coordinated with the Dior-influenced styles of the time, couture-quality boots of this sort did not catch on.

Stylish ankle boots, sometimes called booties or demiboots, continued to be worn occasionally during the winter in the 1950s, with some fashionable shoemakers contributing their own versions, particularly in the later years of the decade. These had the pointed toes and low to high, spindly, underslung heels characteristic of the period. A very few taller boots of high quality were available during the decade, particularly the latter years, some with shaped but not stiletto heels, others flat, some intended for inclement weather or rural settings, some with full shafts and some with narrow, none reaching higher than the upper calf. For the most part, though, only a very few adventurous shoe designers produced boots higher than the ankle in the fifties and the vast majority didn't produce any at all.

After Perugia's and Casale's late 1940s production of boots for a number of Paris couturiers, American designer Beth Levine is widely credited as the next person to introduce boots into Haute Couture. As early as 1953, Beth Levine introduced under the Herbert Levine label a calf-length boot in white kidskin, which sold poorly. Most retailers saw boots as a separate category of footwear from shoes, to be worn for protection from bad weather or for work. By contrast, Levine argued that boots were shoes and could be an integral part of a woman's outfit. In 1957, Herbert Levine produced an entire collection based around fashion boots.

Despite widespread skepticism on the part of other designers and manufacturers, calf-high, kitten-heeled fashion boots for women began to grow in popularity in the late 1950s and early 1960s. In 1957, dance clothier Capezio began offering non-dance mass-market versions of flat, knee-high boots for women, sometimes called ballet boots, and refined them further in 1959 into a style that would become popular in the early 1960s. The leading shoe designer of the late fifties, Roger Vivier, resumed showing boots in 1959, initially just ankle height but extending to unprecedented lengths during the following decade.

=== 1960s ===
In the earliest 1960s, ankle-high boots were the most commonly worn boot style, but knee heights were also occasionally seen, with Capezio's 1959 versions now available in normal leather, patent finishes, and imitation reptile in an expanding color range, though still usually black. In 1961, boots became even more emphasized, with Simonetta lending her design skills to utilitarian forms, Roger Vivier bringing out evening demiboots along with several day styles for Dior, and more mass-market manufacturers also offering a spectrum of shaft heights (mostly ankle-high, none higher than the knee), heel heights, fabrics, colors, and levels of formality. Pumps still reigned, but that would begin to change in 1962, when a few boots were presented for spring, the first signs of a trend toward warm-weather boot-wearing that would last through the early 1970s. For fall of 1962, boots became an integral part of many ensembles shown by designers and manufacturers, still at heights from ankle to knee. Balenciaga's fall collection featured a tall boot by Mancini that just covered the knee. The following year, some boot styles were again shown for spring, and boot heights in the fall ran all the way up to the thigh. Yves Saint Laurent's fall 1963 couture collection included thigh-length alligator skin boots by Roger Vivier and Vogue was able to announce that boots of all lengths were the look of the moment. The re-emergence of boots as a fashion item in the 1960s has been interpreted as an antidote to the femininity of Dior's post war "New Look," although Dior had shown very feminine-looking ankle boots with his voluptuous 1948 collections.

Rising hemlines and the availability of new, brightly colored artificial materials such as PVC combined to make boots an attractive fashion option for younger women. In 1963, André Courrèges released the first of his iconic white leather calf-length boots and designers such as Mary Quant, who launched her own "Quant Afoot" line of footwear in 1967, produced inexpensive, machine-molded plastic boots in a variety of different colors to be worn in tandem with miniskirts. The rising price of leather during the 1960s made these plastic and vinyl boots a popular alternative to more traditional footwear. As skirts became even shorter in the late 1960s, there was a resurgence of interest in thigh-length boots or cuissardes. Pierre Cardin featured shiny black PVC thighboots as part of his futuristic 1968 couture collection and Beth Levine designed seamless, stretch vinyl and nylon stocking boots tall enough to do double duty as hosiery. Levine also showed thigh boots in dressier fabrics like velvet, as did designers like Oscar de la Renta, who presented jeweled boots to the upper thigh. The tallest boots from this period were so high that they were equipped with suspenders to hold them up. Leather pants with their own attached foot piece and sole, essentially forming a waist-high boot, were also seen, an idea that Roger Vivier extended further in 1968, creating all-in-one boot-jumpsuits for Jean-Marie Armand. High laced boots, similar to those worn in Edwardian times and called granny boots, were popular at the end of the sixties and earliest seventies.

=== 1970s and 1980s ===
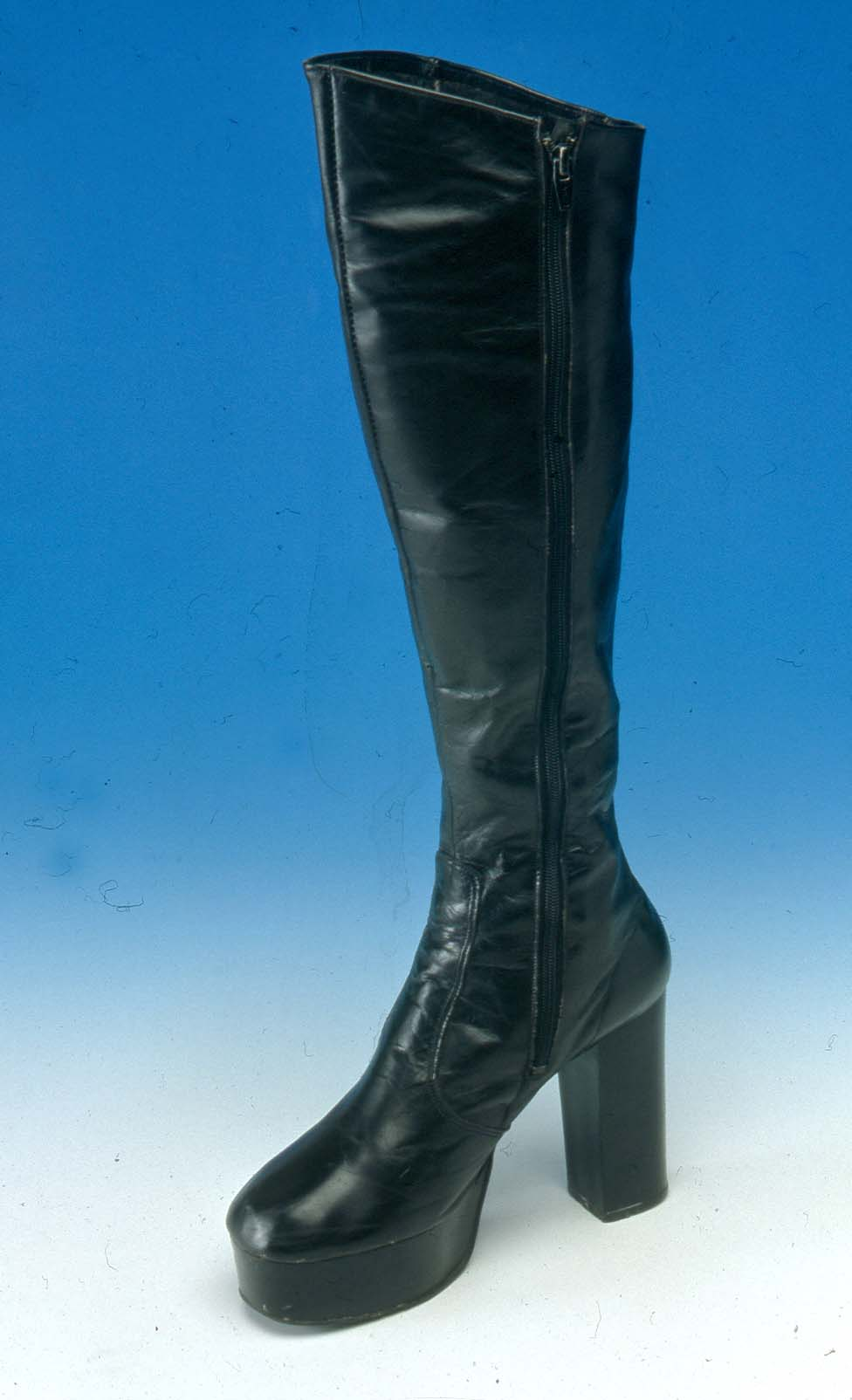
Pair of 1970s platform-soled women's fashion boots in black leather. Northampton Museum #1979.123.1

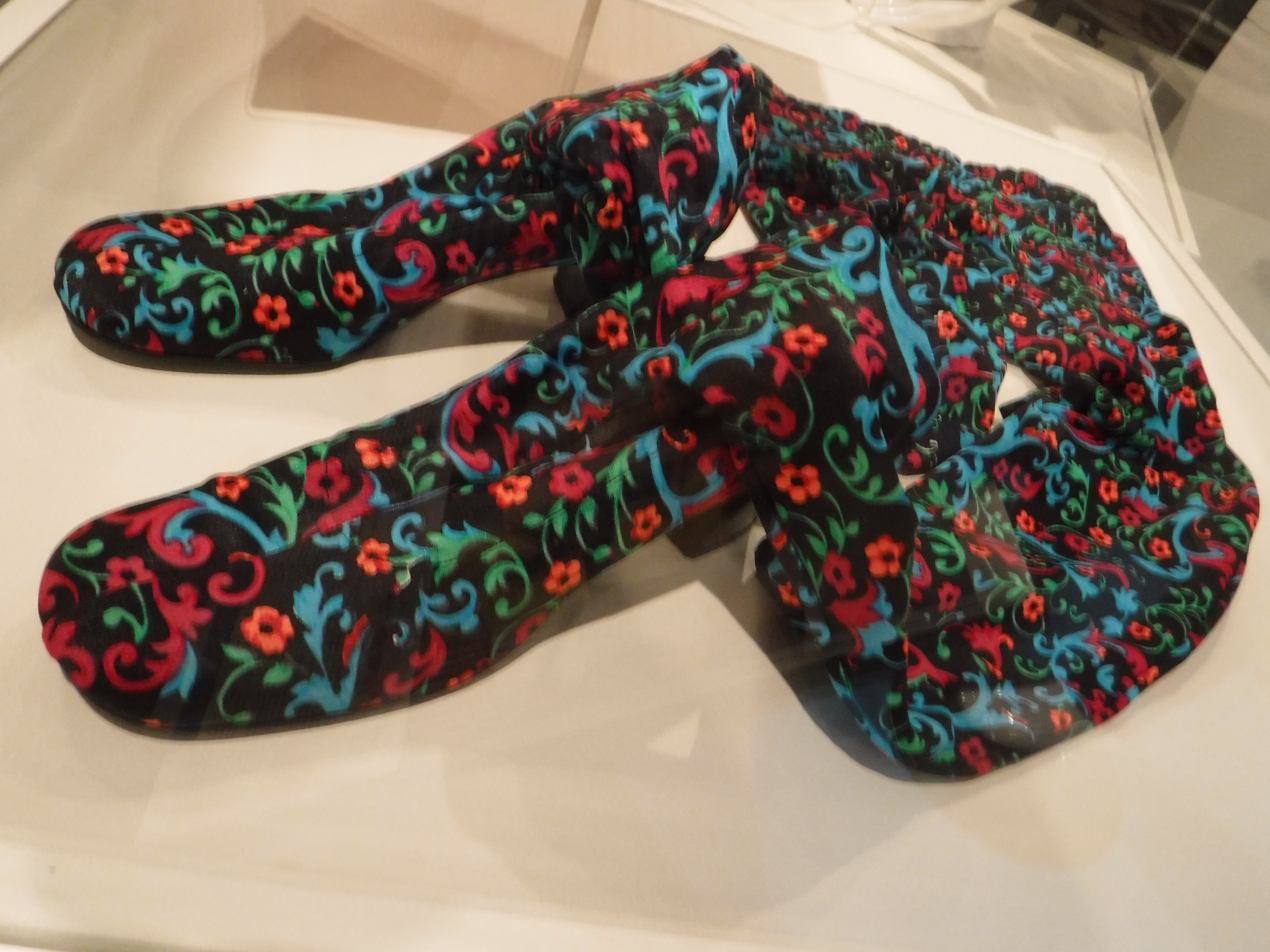
Pan-T-Boots, c. 1971, combined tights and boots

Although fashion boots and particularly "go-go boots" are often described as "typical" of 1960s fashion, it wasn't until the 1970s that boots became a mainstream fashion staple for women; for many women in the 1960s, boots were seen as "a superfluous accessory" more suitable for teenagers and college girls than a grown woman while, in 1968, 75% of office managers surveyed by The New York Times disapproved of their female staff wearing boots to work. By contrast, in 1977, boots made up 20 percent of all women's shoe sales in the United States and the end of the decade saw fashion boots occupying multiple pages of mainstream mail-order catalogs by companies such as Sears, Wards, and Kays.

The early 1970s were typified by tight-fitting, vinyl boots rising to the knee or higher. These sometimes had mock lacing on the front and zipped up at the rear; they could be worn under the new maxi dresses, which had slits in them to show the leg. An even higher combination was the Pan-T-Boot, a single garment combining stretch tights with boots. In summer, pale, high-legged boots in printed or open weave fabric were teamed with summery dresses; these often had extensive cut-outs, so that they were more like high-legged sandals than conventional boots. Platform-soled styles were also popular. The multi-colored suede and canvas over-the-knee boots produced by the London store Biba were so sought-after that queues would form outside the store when a delivery was due. By the late 1970s, form-fitting, shaped-leg boots were being replaced with straight-legged designs, frequently worn over jeans or other pants, which were often pulled-on rather than zip-fastened. As well as high-heeled dress boots, more rugged designs, by companies such as Frye, were widely worn. The end of the decade saw a growth in popularity of shorter, calf-length boots, often worn layered with socks and tights, and a revival of interest in over-the-knee and thigh-length boots, which were popularized by punk and new wave performers such as Blondie's Debbie Harry.

In contrast to the preceding decade, the 1980s saw a sharp decline in the popularity of high-legged boots, a direction that began with the introduction of shoulder-padded 1980s styles in fall of 1978. Instead, ankle boots in a variety of styles were particularly popular, as were low-heeled, calf-length, pull-on styles. Knee length boots, if worn at all, tended to be low-heeled, pull-on styles, sometimes referred to as "riding boots", that were combined with long skirts. In the late 1980s, over-the-knee boots made a reappearance; these were loose-fitting, low-heeled styles in suede, often brightly colored or decorated with brocade. In 1990, Karl Lagerfeld included thigh-length satin boots in his Fall/Winter Couture collection for Chanel, using the boots as an alternative to leggings, but it was not until the following decade that the inherent elegance of classic dress boot styles was rediscovered.

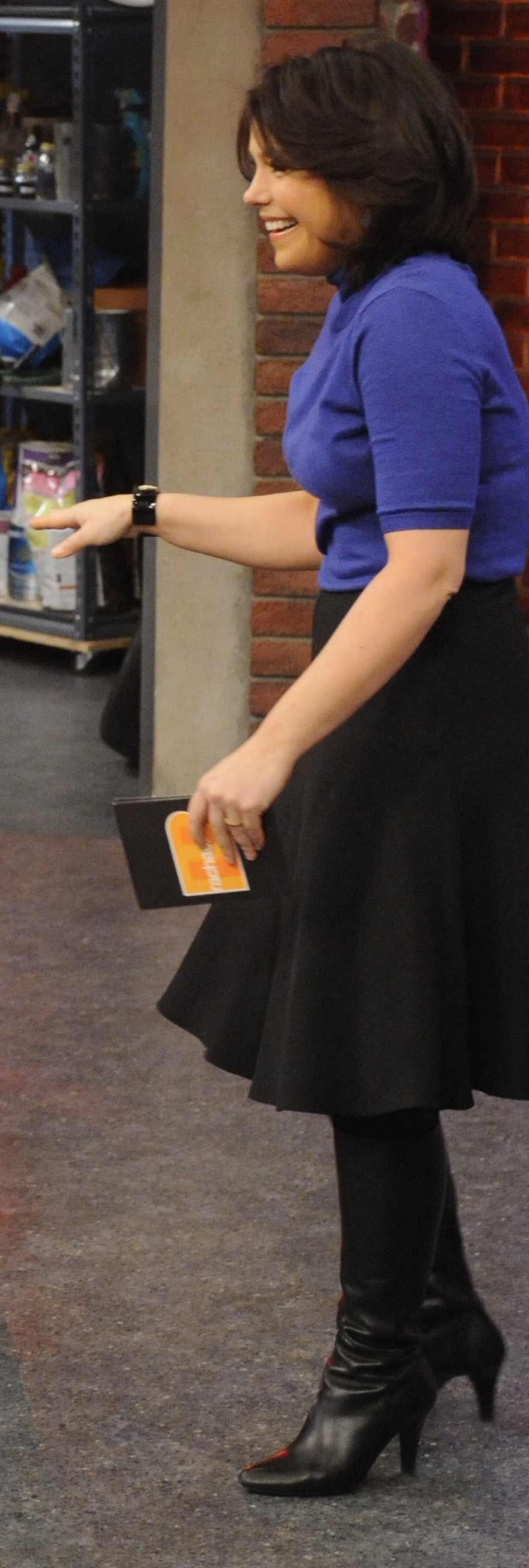
American television personality, Rachael Ray, in knee-length, black leather fashion boots, January 2009

=== 1990s ===
The early 1990s saw an explosion in dance club culture and its associated fashions, many of which looked back to the 1960s and 1970s for inspiration, as well as drawing on fetish-themed elements. Knee-length go-go boots, platform-soled boots, and even thigh-length PVC boots were worn by clubbers, but although some designers flirted with these styles of footwear (e.g. Gianni Versace) mainstream take-up was limited. Nonetheless, by 1993 boots were popular enough for Vogue to declare that it was "The Year of the Boot", with a wide range of styles from ankle-length to over-the-knee, designed to be worn at any time and with any hem length. Knee-length boots became commonplace again, initially as lace-up styles which were subsequently replaced by zip-fastened boots in the second half of the decade. In 1995, Versace's Fall/Winter collection featured slim-fitting, spike heeled boots, rising to just below the knee, which were a precursor of the commonest style of dress boot for the next 10 years. Just as boots in the 1960s were seen as an antidote to the femininity of the 'New Look', this early nineties resurgence was linked to the development of lighter, more feminine clothing styles that were contrasted and complemented by wearing boots.

=== 2000s–2020s ===
By the turn of the 21st century fashion boots in a variety of styles were back to the same level of ubiquity that they had enjoyed in the 1970s. A pair of knee-length boots, often with metal accents, was widely regarded as a must-have wardrobe item for the clothes-conscious woman, paired with knee length skirts and dresses for business and casual wear. Ankle boots also remained very popular and in the latter part of the first decade knee-length styles worn over pants, especially jeans, were common. In 2009 thigh-length boots were a subject of major attention by the fashion press, receiving guarded approval and a level of mainstream acceptance that they had never previously achieved; this trend continued in 2010 and by the following year over-the-knee styles had become commonplace. Also in 2011, ankle boots were being promoted as a popular summer alternative to sandals.

== Design ==
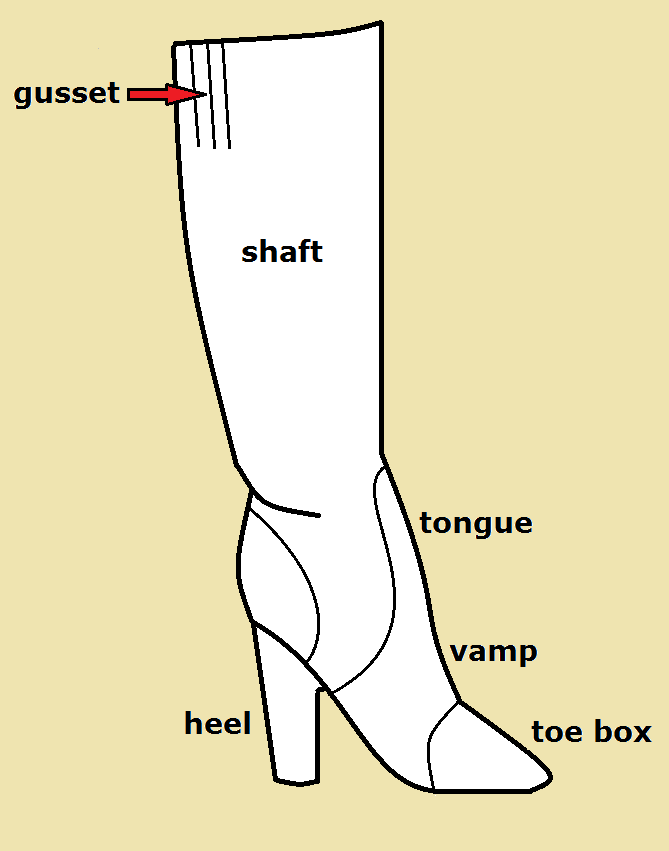
diagram of a typical knee-length fashion boot showing shoemaker's terminology

Fashion boots generally employ the same range of soles and heels as are found in shoes. The defining character of the boot is the length of the shaft. Ankle boots generally have a shaft height of less than 8 inches (20 cm), calf-length boots 8–15 inches (20–38 cm), knee-length boots 15–19 inches (38–48 cm), while over-the knee boots have shaft lengths of 19 inches (38 cm) or more; however these divisions are arbitrary and at the boundaries the decision as to whether a boot is, for example, calf-length or knee-length is largely subjective.

The shaft of a fashion boot can be fitted (i.e. following the curve of the wearer's calf), straight-legged, or loose-fitting (or "slouchy"). In close-fitting boots, flexibility is achieved by the use of gussets; slits in the material either at the top of the shaft (in knee-length boots), or wider panels at the sides of the shaft (in ankle boots), which are backed with elasticized fabric. Compression folds around the ankle allow for movement of the foot. In over-the-knee boots, flexion of the knee is usually attained by a vent at the back of the boot, running from the top of the shaft to the back of the knee. This may be closed with laces, elasticized, or left open. Where a vent is not used, freedom of movement is achieved either by having the top of the shaft flare outwards above the knee, or making all or part of the shaft out of a stretchable material.

A variety of fasteners are seen in fashion boots. Laces are commonly used in ankle boots, but are too time-consuming for longer styles. Zip fasteners are widely employed in all styles of boot – they may run the entire length of the shaft, or just the ankle and lower calf – these partial-length zips make it easier to insert the foot into the toe of the boot by relaxing the fit around the ankle. Pull-on boots have no fasteners and tend to have a looser fit than zip or lace-up boots; they sometimes have a loop of leather at the top of the shaft, called a boot-strap, to assist with pulling the boot on. Finally, button-fastened boots were common at the beginning of the last century but are rarely seen today. If present, buttons are usually employed as design accents on boots; other decorative features include straps, buckles, studs, and decorative stitching.

=== Ankle boot ===
These are the most widely worn style of fashion boots, usually under pants. Ankle boots are also the only type of fashion boot commonly worn by both men and women, and the only one to have remained popular without a break since the 19th century. They vary in length from booties or shoe boots (effectively a shoe that skims the ankle) to boots that cover the lower part of the calf.

=== Calf-length boot ===
Because the top of this boot hits the curve of the leg at the widest point of the calf it is regarded by stylists as particularly challenging to wear; even average legs can look fat. For this reason, calf-length boots are usually worn under pants or with long skirts that cover the top of the boot.

=== Knee-length boot ===
These come in a wide variety of colors and materials (e.g. leather, suede, fabric) and can be worn with skirts or dresses of any length, under or over pants, or with leggings. A boot that hits the leg just below the knee is thought to be particularly stylish.

=== Over-the-knee boot ===
Also known as thighboots or cuissardes, these boots were originally worn by men in the 16th, 17th and 18th centuries to protect the legs while riding before being adapted as a fashion item for women in the 1960s and 1970s. In this context they have sometimes been considered provocative or daring because of past association with fetishism and the sex industry and so have had patchy mainstream acceptance. Even when popular, a combination of one or more features such as lower heels, softer materials (e.g. suede), muted colors, and avoidance of skin exposure (by wearing over pants, leggings, or opaque hose) is usually employed to avoid the so-called "Vivian" effect (a reference to Julia Roberts' character in the 1990 movie Pretty Woman).

== See also ==
- List of boots
- List of shoe styles
- Boot
- Go-go boots
- Knee-high boots
- Platform boot
- Russian boot
- Thigh-high boots
- Over-the-knee boot
