= Boot fetishism =

Sexual fetish

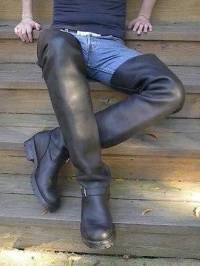
Man wearing high boots over jeans

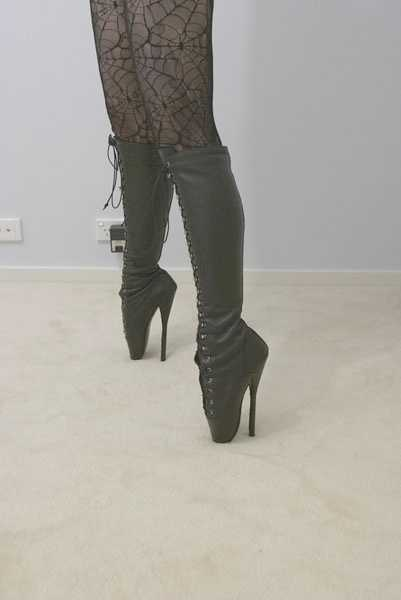
Knee-high ballet boots, impractical boots made expressly for their sexual appeal

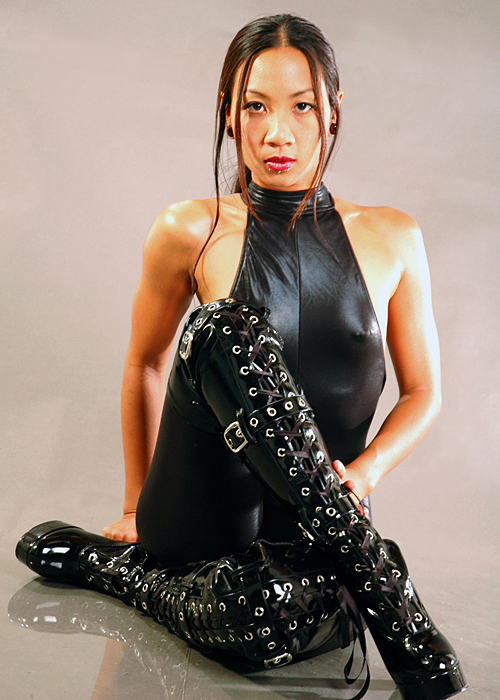
A model wearing boots

Boot fetishism is a sexual fetish focused on boots. Boots have become the object of sexual attraction amounting to fetishism for some people and they have become a standard accessory in BDSM scenes (where leather, latex and PVC boots are favoured) and a fashion accessory in music videos. Boots are seen as perhaps the most fetishistic of all footwear and boots are the most popular fetish clothing attire.

== History ==
One of the earliest descriptions of boots as a fetishistic object can be found in Émile Zola's 1868 novel Thérèse Raquin. Actual boot fetishism is described in the diaries of 19th-century British woman Hannah Cullwick, of which parts have been published.

Hermine Hug-Hellmuth described boot fetishism scientifically in 1915. This article has also been published in English with comments by Arlene K. Richards in 1990, as Female fetishes and female perversions: Hermine Hug-Hellmuth's "A case of female foot or more properly boot fetishism" reconsidered.

Boots were used by Stanley Rachman as a subject for research on conditioning as a cause for fetishism in the 1960s, making men sexually aroused by seeing pictures of boots, but the results have been put into question later, as boots already were very much en vogue for sexually attractive women at the time.

Unlike shoes, boot styles have often appeared as street wear before they inspire fashion designers. Boots are usually seen as a sign of empowerment for the wearer, especially when worn by women. This may be a reason for the connection to BDSM, where boots usually are seen as a statement of dominance. So-called boot worship became a common subcultural practice among sadomasochists and related fetishists in the early 20th century.

There is also a very prominent subsection of mostly gay men who fetishize men's boots, with "boot worship" being a common practice in this group, to the point where there is a yearly contest to see who is the best bootblack.

== Causes ==
Kevin Hsu and J. Michael Bailey (2019) argue that there is little evidence for "sexual conditioning" explanations of boot fetishism, since only a small minority of men who have seen attractive women in boots develop boot fetishes. They also say that "boot fetishes would not occur in a world without boots, and in a world where men and women switched boots, different patterns of fetishes would likely develop". They argue that random developmental processes which are still poorly understood make some men more prone to developing paraphilias and fetishes.

== Popular culture ==
The television series The Avengers, which ran in the 1960s, often featured fetishistic clothing, with Emma Peel, played by Diana Rigg, wearing thigh-high boots as a characteristic sign of her as a sexy and strong woman. Patrick Macnee and Rigg's predecessor Honor Blackman (as Cathy Gale) released a 45 RPM single in 1964 entitled "Kinky Boots".

Female comic book super heroines and villains, like Wonder Woman and Catwoman, also often wear boots as a sign of combined female power and sex appeal.

Jill, protagonist of the video game Mighty Jill Off, is a sexual submissive with a fetish for boots.

== See also ==
- List of boots
- Foot fetishism
- Fuck-me boots
- Shoe fetishism
- Bootblacking (BDSM)
- People:
  - Charles Guyette
  - Eric Stanton
  - Gene Bilbrew
  - Irving Klaw
  - John Willie
  - Lionel Bussey
