= Fuck-me shoes =

Slang term for high heels

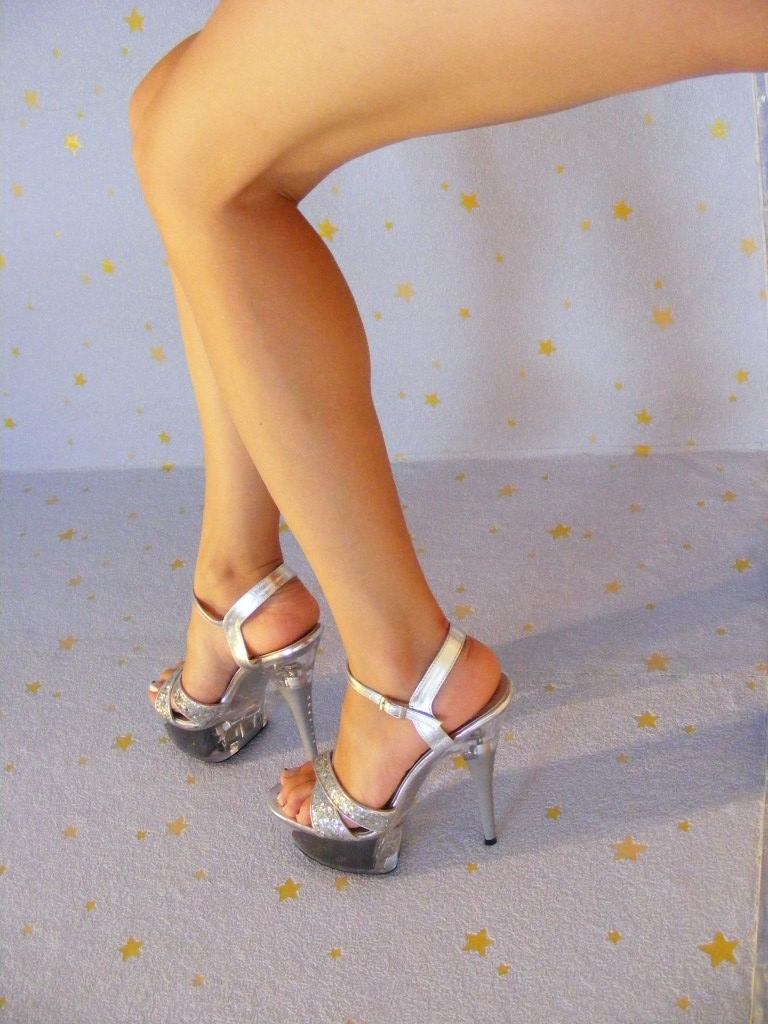
High-heel shoes worn in an overt sexual context

Fuck-me shoes, alternatively fuck-me boots or fuck-me pumps (occasionally extended to knock-me-down-and-fuck-me shoes), is a slang term for women's high-heeled shoes that exaggerate a sexual image. The term can be applied to any women's shoes that are worn with the intention of arousing others. It is sometimes used to imply condemnation against the women who choose to wear them or in a misogynistic fashion toward the women who wear them.

The term is similar in meaning to kinky boots, although typically kinky boots refer more specifically to boots suited to a particular fetish.

== Term and usage ==
The phrase possibly originated in the United States, where two similar terms are used: "'fuck-you shoes' implying a disregard for convention or propriety, or 'fuck-off shoes' where 'fuck-off' means both outsize and aggressive". Tight trousers were called "come fuck-me's" as listed in a 1972 British dictionary of slang (The Queens' Vernacular: A Gay Lexicon), while a 1974 book (Myra & Gore: A New View of Myra Breckinridge and A Candid Interview with Gore Vidal: A Book for Vidalophiles) is cited as making a reference to a person wearing "a pair of fabulous 1940s-Joan Crawford-fuck-me's". The song "We are the Dead" from David Bowie's 1974 Diamond Dogs album mentions "fuck-me pumps".

In Shelley Winters' first autobiography, Shelley: Also Known as Shirley, she recounts a memory from being Marilyn Monroe's roommate: "These were a special kind of sandal–tied in front with a bow–that Marilyn and I used to 'borrow' from the studio. Giggling, we called them our 'fuck-me shoes.' They really were the sexiest shoes I've ever seen. Whenever we did pinup photos for the soldiers, we wore them."

Prominent feminist Germaine Greer brought what had been an "obscure" term to more mainstream notoriety when she used it in 1995. Greer used the term in referring to fellow Guardian columnist Suzanne Moore as having "hair bird's-nested all over the place, fuck-me shoes and three fat inches of cleavage". Greer made the remark – in a column originally submitted to The Guardian but then published in a toned-down version, sans the above quote, in The Spectator – in response to a comment Moore had made to the "Londoner's Diary" over Richard Neville's (false) claim that Greer had a hysterectomy scar on her abdomen, with Moore framing Greer's supposed hysterectomy as a voluntary decision to have herself sterilized. Greer was also quoted during the 1990s as criticizing a number of women writers that she termed "lifestyle feminists" who were, in her view, espousing feminism at nothing more than a superficial level. Pamela Church Gibson identifies Greer as a dominant player in defining an anti-fashion feminist rhetoric.

Moore's response to Greer was that her fashion choices were dictated by her own tastes and not to please men: "As someone who grew up with punk and Madonna, I take it for granted that women dress to please themselves and not men". Moore has said her footwear is "not worn just for the benefit of men", implying that the intention is twofold, to please both her and observers, although she also says "Most of the pleasure [of buying shoes] involves a private fantasy that starts with me and ends at my feet. Men don't get a look in."

The incident, and the term, received coverage in British media and beyond, and the term has become associated with Greer in popular culture. Greer had been denouncing stiletto shoes as symbols of women's subordination as early as 1970 (in The Female Eunuch).

The expression was further popularized by the success of British soul singer Amy Winehouse’s single "Pumps", originally listed as "Fuck Me Pumps" on her 2003 album Frank.

In January 2011, in a forum with teenaged students in Cartagena, Colombia, Greer noticed the popularity of silicone breast implants in the audience. She asked students why they thought women tennis players wore skirts, and asked why a young woman would choose to wear stiletto shoes: "So you think the shoes are her fetish? […] I call them fuck-me shoes," she said, "because you can't walk in them but you can wear them in bed."

=== Cultural debate ===
The underlying conflict arises from the question of what is considered an appropriate way for women to present their bodies, particularly in public spaces. Feminists are divided on the issue, with first-wave feminism more likely to condemn certain forms of clothing, whilst second-wave feminism began to take a more sex-positive stance, and third-wave feminism has largely come to view criticisms of fashion choices to be "slut-shaming", an action viewed as misogynist, even when coming from other women. The development of the SlutWalk protest demonstrations against dress codes is influenced by this position.

When punk fashion was on the rise during the late 1970s, young women consciously played with the symbolism inherent in their accessorizing, mixing choices that created a jarring visual clash; leather was combined with lace, steel spikes with velvet, stiletto heels with heavy ankle chains. The result was to exaggerate a look of sexual aggression, turning "'fuck me' shoes into signifiers of 'fuck you'". The punk influenced youth counterculture continues with this trend, part of the wider trend of fetish fashion.

== See also ==
- Alternative lifestyle
- Boot fetishism
- Damsel in distress
- Gender roles
- Go-go boots
- List of boots
- List of shoe styles
- Lordosis behavior
- Objectification
- Shoe fetishism
- Thigh-high boots
