= Over-the-knee boot =

Type of footwear

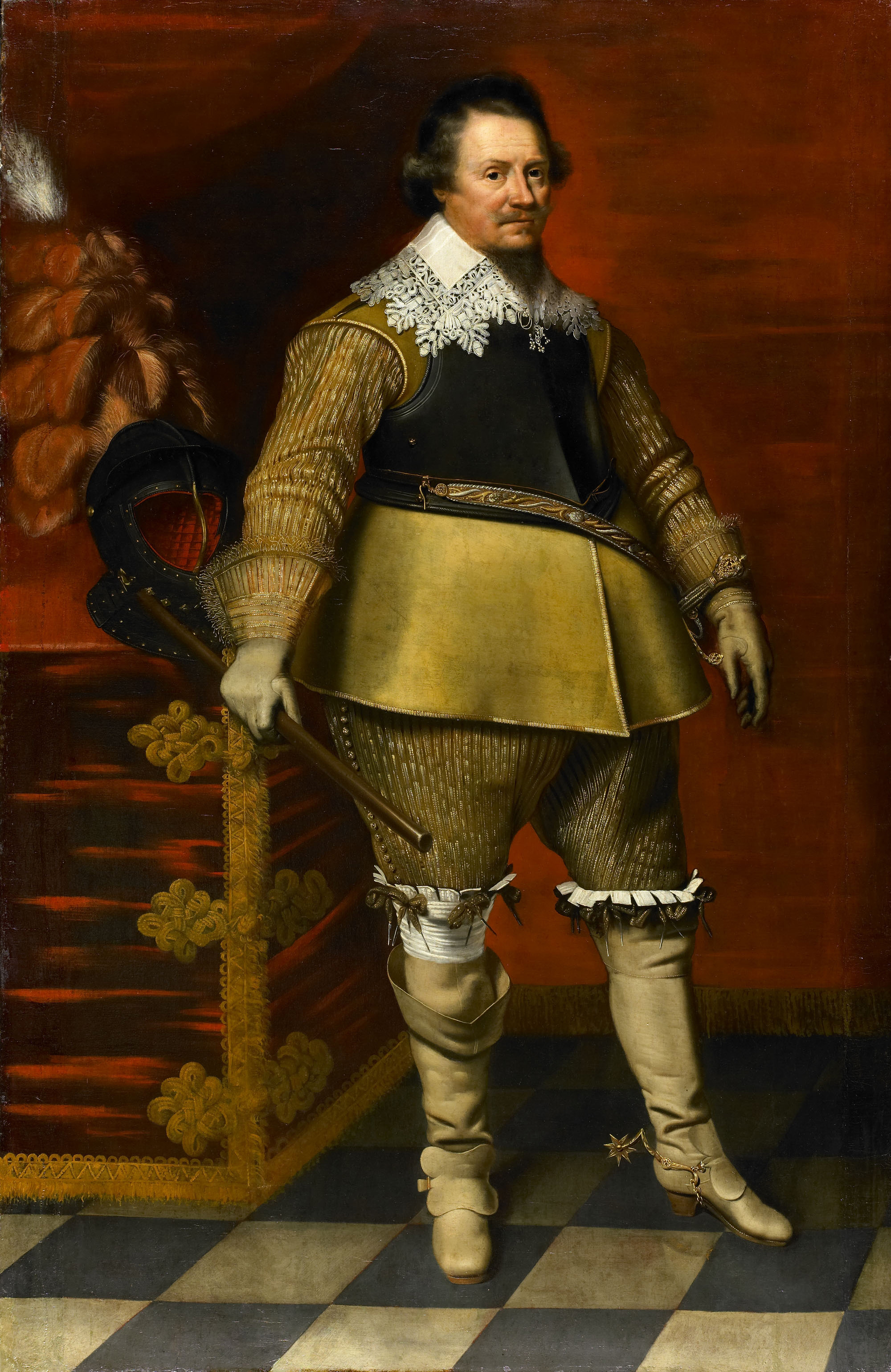
Portrait of Ernst Casimir (1573–1632), count of Nassau-Dietz, wearing over-the-knee riding boots

Over-the-knee boots (or cuissardes, which include thighboots, top boots, hip-boots, and waders), OTK boots, are long boots that fully or partly cover the knee. Originally created as a man's riding boot in the 15th century, in the latter part of the 20th century, the style was redefined as a fashion boot for women. Over-the-knee boots are also used as a work boot in circumstances requiring additional protection for the legs (e.g. fishing waders).

== As men's footwear ==
Over-the-knee boots first became popular as riding boots for men in the 15th century, when the growing popularity of doublet and lightweight hose meant that extra protection was required for the legs when on horseback. This was also linked to the decline in the use of full plate armour as the use of firearms became more widespread in warfare. Heavy cavalry in the 16th and 17th centuries had only limited armour, in the form of a helmet and breastplate, or cuirass. Thigh-length boots in heavy leather provided additional protection for the legs. Today, many cavalry regiments still retain these high boots for ceremonial dress.

Riding boots of this style were widespread in the 17th and 18th century, and remained in common use through to the late 19th century. They are the likely source of the term bootlegging, which originally came from the practice of concealing hip flasks of alcohol in the legs of boots. Because of these historical associations, cuissardes came to convey an image of potent masculinity, conjuring up images of cavaliers, pirates, or musketeers.

== As women's footwear ==
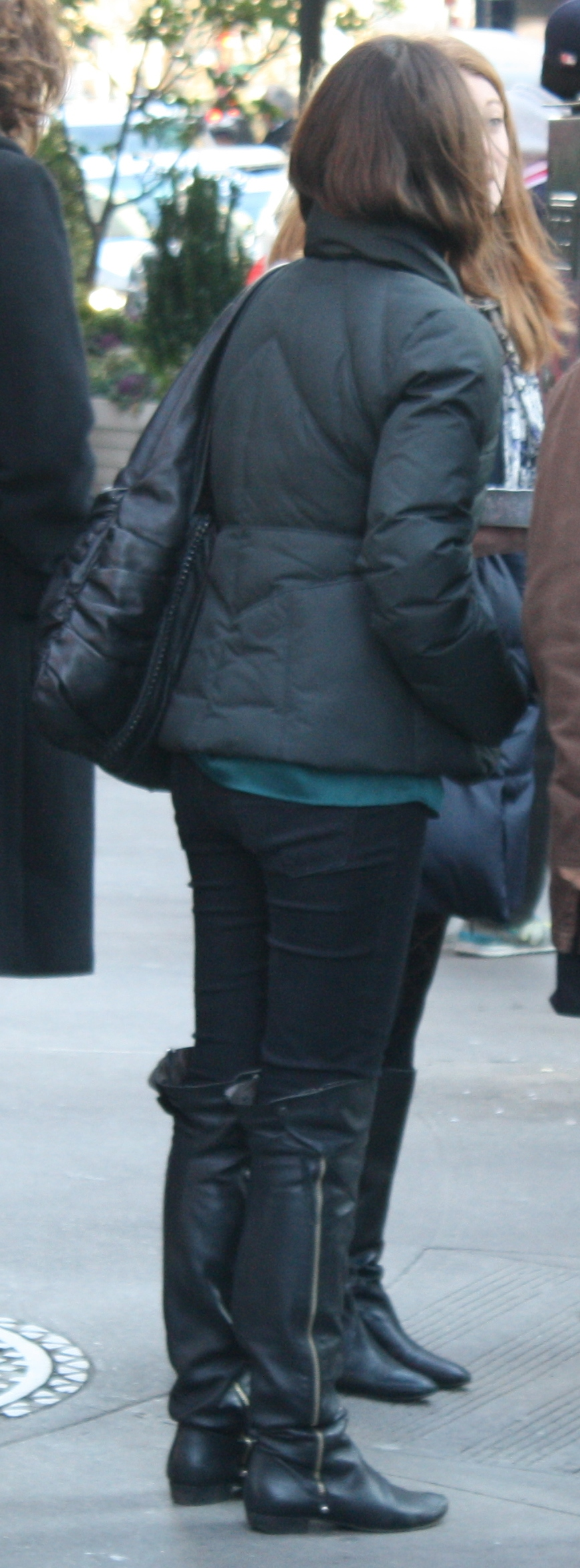
Woman wearing over-the-knee fashion boots, 2011

The earliest examples of women wearing over-the-knee boots come from the traditional principal boy role in pantomime theater, in which the young male protagonist of the play is played by a young actress in boys' clothes. These breeches roles were also a rare opportunity for an early 20th century actress to wear a revealing costume, potentially increasing the size of the audience. When playing historical characters such as Dick Whittington, the principal boy would often wear over-the-knee boots as part of her costume, emphasizing her swashbuckling, heroic character.

The adoption of over-the-knee boots as a fashion item for women began in the early 1960s. In 1962, Balenciaga's fall collection featured a tall boot by Mancini that just covered the knee and the following year, Yves Saint Laurent's couture collection included thigh-length alligator skin boots by designer Roger Vivier. These were based on a design originally produced by Vivier for the dancer Rudolf Nureyev in the ballet Swan Lake. The adaptation of hyper-masculine boots as fashion footwear for women has been interpreted as part of a broader 1960s trend against the femininity of Dior's post-war "New Look".

Rising hemlines and the availability of new, brightly colored artificial materials such as PVC, combined to make boots an attractive fashion option for younger women. As skirts became even shorter in the late 1960s, there was a resurgence of interest in thigh-length boots or cuissardes. Pierre Cardin featured shiny black PVC thighboots as part of his futuristic 1968 couture collection and Beth Levine designed seamless, stretch vinyl and nylon stocking boots tall enough to do double duty as hosiery. The tallest boots from this period were so high that they were equipped with suspenders to hold them up.

Over the next three decades, the popularity of over-the-knee boots as a fashion item for women waxed and waned. In the early 1970s, the multi-colored suede and canvas over-the-knee boots produced by the London store Biba were so sought-after that queues would form outside the store when a delivery was due. The end of the decade saw a second-wave of over-the-knee and thigh-length boots; these were a longer version of the stack-heeled knee-length boots popular in the late 1970s and were usually worn over jeans. In the late 1980s, over-the-knee boots made a reappearance; these were loose-fitting, low-heeled styles in suede, often brightly colored or decorated with brocade. By 1990, Karl Lagerfeld had included thigh-length satin boots in his Fall/Winter Couture collection for Chanel, using the boots as an alternative to leggings; there was a brief vogue for thigh-length "riding boots” in the early 1990s and over-the-knee styles were intermittently popular throughout the first decade of the 21st century. In 2009, thigh-length boots were a subject of major attention by the fashion press, receiving guarded approval and a level of mainstream acceptance that they had never previously achieved; this trend continued in 2010 and by the following year, over-the-knee styles had become commonplace.

Thigh-high boots are more flattering on women with longer legs: "The shorter you are, the less leg there is above the top of the boot, when wearing footwear that ends above the knee. A very high heel helps to give the illusion of height, but when there is much more boot visible than leg; the effect is to optically foreshorten you."

== As work boots ==
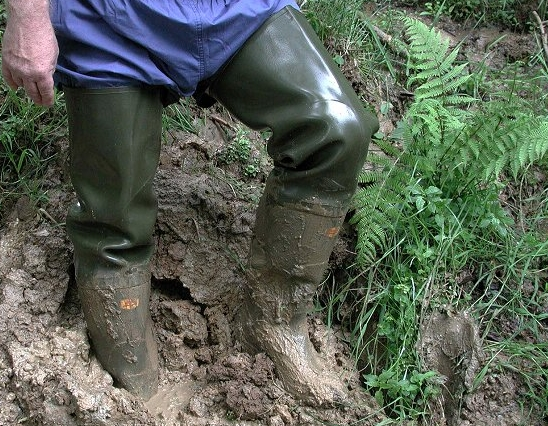
Hip boots in mud

Hip boots (sometimes colloquially called "waders"), are a type of boot worn by river fishermen. Hip boots are typically made out of rubber, and cover the legs to the tops of the thighs or to the waist. They are designed to protect the fisherman when wading into deeper waters and keep the feet and legs warm in autumn and winter. Hip boots are also worn by ecologists and environmental scientists who do tests in swamps or lakes to determine the quality of water.

In contrast to hip boots, waders are waterproof boots that extend from the foot to the chest. Waders are available with boots attached or can have attached stocking feet (usually made of the wader material), to wear inside shorter boots. In addition to being used for leisure purposes, such as angling or waterfowl hunting, industrial, heavy-duty waders are used as protective clothing in the chemical industry, agriculture and in the maintenance of water supply, sewerage and other utilities.

== See also ==
- List of boots
- List of shoe styles
- Boot
- Fashion boot
- Hip boot
- Waders
- Jackboot
- Go-go boot
- Knee-high boot
- Thigh-high boots
