= Russian boot =

Style of footwear

Russian boot is the name applied to a style of calf- or knee-length fashion boot for women that was popular in the early part of the 20th century. Russian boots fell out of favor in the 1930s, but were the inspiration for the high-leg fashion boots that returned to popularity in the 1950s and 60s. Today the term Russian boot is sometimes applied to the style of low-heeled boots worn by some folk dancers.

== History ==
The original Russian boot was the valenki, a flat-heeled, wide-topped, knee-length boot worn by Russian soldiers. Designed to combat the extremely cold Russian winters, valenki were normally made of thick felt. The boots' uppers were loosely constructed for convenience and comfort, which produced the style's distinctive wrinkling effect around the ankles. The term was later applied to women’s boots in leather that appeared in the second decade of the 20th century.

In the late 19th and early 20th centuries, shoes with high uppers, buttoned or laced and reaching to the lower calves, were common footwear for women. Rising hemlines made longer styles of boots popular, particularly when the alternative was an exposure of the leg, which was still considered shocking. In 1913, Denise Poiret, wife of celebrated French couturier Paul Poiret, caused a sensation in Paris and New York by wearing knee-length boots in wrinkled Morocco leather. Designed by her husband and made by the bottier Favereau, these boots were styled with a low heel and a square toe; she had versions in red, white, green, and yellow In 1915 the New York Times reported that, partly inspired by Mme. Poiret, these so-called "Russian boots" were becoming an outré statement by some cutting-edge fashionable women. However, no boots of any kind caught on with the general public in these years, women being accustomed to traditional high-top shoes, either laced or buttoned. Russian boots remained a forward fashion statement, however, adopted by stage and film stars, including Mary Pickford, Irene Castle, Cécile Sorel, and Gloria Swanson, and endorsed by such leading designers as the London-based Lucile (Lady Duff Gordon), who also famously wore them herself.

From the mid-1910s into the early '20s, as hemlines rose from ankle length to mid-calf, high-heeled Russian boots with pointe or rounded toes, were increasingly popular. They were available in a variety of styles, calf- or knee-length, with a Cuban or Louis heel, which could be pull-on, or zip-fastened for a closer fit. Worn with calf-length and finally knee-length skirts, they often featured decorative features such as elaborate stitching or fur trim. Russian boots were stylish throughout the 1920s as the fashionable alternative to galoshes in winter. They also acquired a racy reputation, as the sort of footwear worn by girls who frequented saloon bars and speakeasies.

By the mid-1920s, British shoe manufacturers were reporting record orders for high-legged women’s boots and they were so popular that they were being blamed for causing women to catch colds, have accidents in the street, and even injure themselves. Initially popular in Britain, the new boot style quickly spread to Paris and the United States, while English women in India complained that Russian boots were not yet available in Bombay. The emergence of these tall boots for women was interpreted by some contemporary writers as a consequence of women’s transition from the “leisure class” to the world of business.

With increasing sales, however, complaints began to be made about the poor quality of leather used in the cheaper pairs which were not adequately waterproofed and had a tendency to sag around the ankle; although manufacturers took steps to address issues of fit by introducing taller, better fitting styles. This was ultimately blamed for their decline in popularity. Where protection from the elements was needed, Russian boots were increasingly replaced by fashionable variants of the rubber Wellington boot. Mass popularity was also seen as a barrier to chic women adopting boots as a fashion item. Although they were still popular as late as the beginning of the 1930s, within a few years Russian boots had fallen out of favor. It was not until the 1950s that boots were again regarded as fashion items for women.

== Today ==
Russian boots were the inspiration for the modern fashion boot, some of which closely resemble styles that first appeared in the 1920s. The term “Russian boot” is usually applied to the flat-heeled, calf-length boots popular with some traditions of folk dancing, especially those from Eastern Europe. In 2009, The New York Times reported that the original felt valenki was being reinvented as a fashion item in Russia.

== See also ==
- List of boots
- List of shoe styles
- Boot
- Fashion boot
- Valenki
- 1920s in fashion
