= Thigh-high boots =

Boots extending above the knee

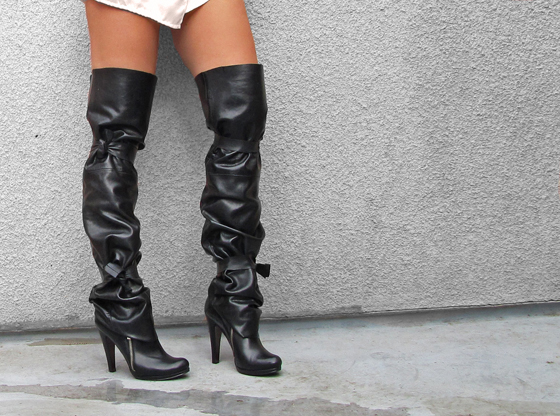
Leather thigh high boots being worn

Thigh-high boots, known also as thigh-length boots or simply thigh boots, are boots that extend above the knees to at least mid-thigh. Other terms for this footwear include over-the-knee boots, a name originally used for 15th century riding boots for men. Over-the-knee boots are sometimes abbreviated to OTK boots. Lengths vary from reaching just over the knee to reaching almost to the crotch (referred to as crotch boots or crotch-high boots).

Thigh boots are made of materials such as leather, synthetic materials (including vinyl and sheet latex) or fabrics (including silk and polyester microfiber). Many are constructed with zippers, but some are designed as pull-on boots. Heel heights vary, but most styles are either flat or have high heels greater than 3 inches (7.5 cm). Heel styles vary from metal spikes to chunky. Like other boots, they can also have platform soles.

Thigh boots are considered by many to be erotic or kinky. They are used as fetish clothing in boot fetishism and shoe fetishism and also as part of leather fetishism and rubber and PVC fetishism. Cheaper thigh boots are often worn by female models, prostitutes and dominatrices, so many people consider them icons of such trades. Because of the latter, they are often associated with sadomasochism. Nevertheless, they are frequently sold by couture designers, perhaps because of the implied eroticism. Thigh-high boots are considered by many a symbol of women's power, authority and sex appeal.

The visual appearance of thigh-high boots depends on the length of the legs. Samantha Clark, in her book Outfits in Minutes, writes: "The shorter you are, the less leg there is above the top of the boot, when wearing footwear that ends above the knee. A very high heel helps to give the illusion of height, but when there is much more boot visible than leg; the effect is to optically foreshorten you."

== History ==
=== Late Victorian era ===
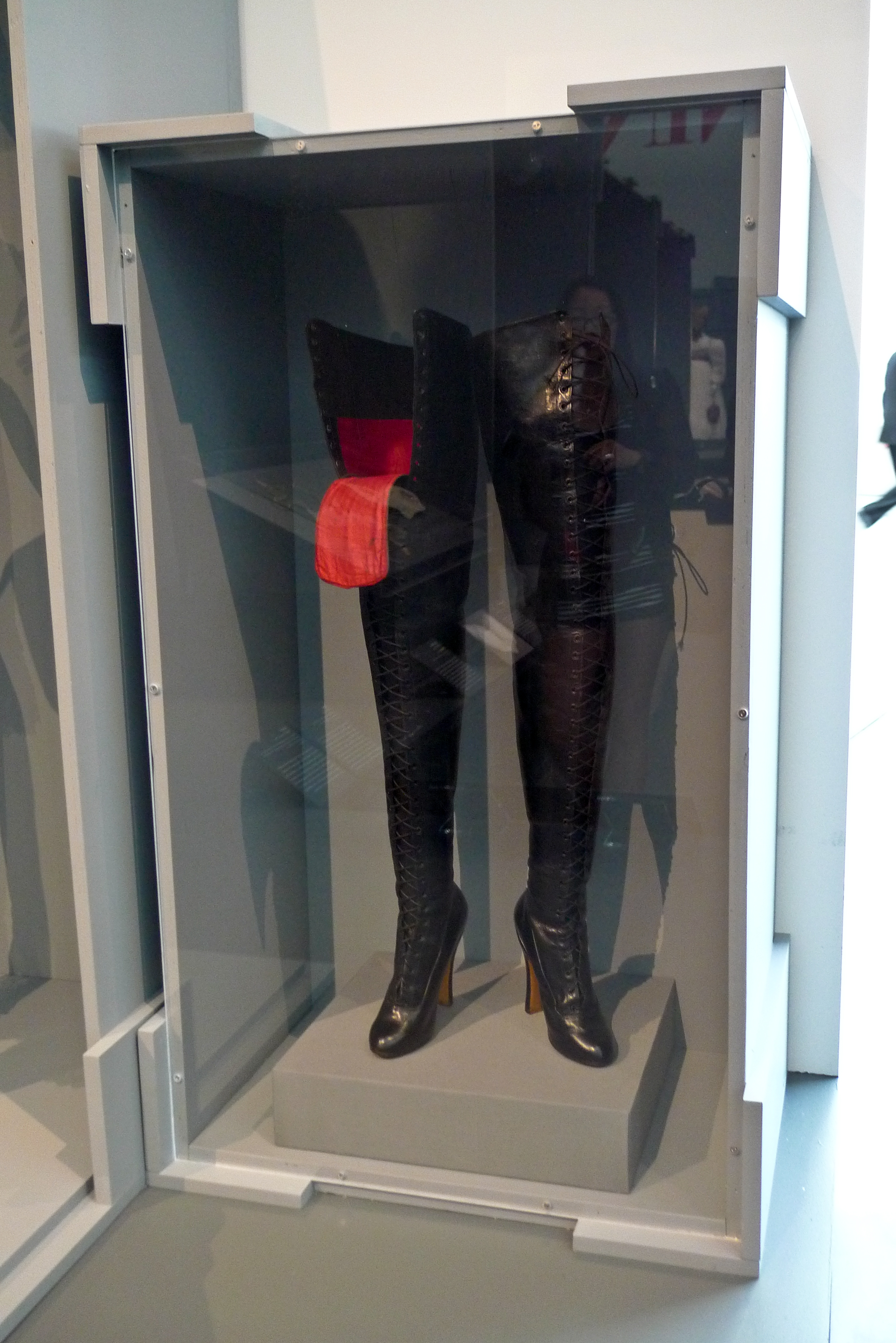
Pair of fetish boots, c. 1900, from a Los Angeles County Museum of Art exhibit.

Laced leather boots were fashionable throughout the Victorian era for women. By the end of the 19th century, over-the-knee length laced leather boots were becoming a trend among London prostitutes wanting a style that would appeal to foot fetishists and clients interested in finding a dominatrix.

=== 1960s ===
Kinky boots, also referred to as fetish boots, are boots made typically with patent leather and high stiletto heels. Their extreme characteristics intended to present a dramatic sexy appearance, such as by a prostitute or dominatrix. Characteristics often include very high heels, thigh- or crotch-high length, or unusual colors or materials.

Boots of this type, and specifically the thigh-high leather boots worn by Honor Blackman in her role as Cathy Gale in The Avengers, are referred to in the 1964 song "Kinky Boots" by Blackman and her Avengers co-star Patrick Macnee.

=== In the 2010s ===
Thigh-high boots were worn by many celebrities in the late 2010s. Ariana Grande incorporated many styles of thigh-high boots into her signature look. Because of this many articles were published advertising thigh-high boots, resulting in a surge of demand for the item. This could also be linked to the fact that the years of 2018–2019 saw a trend of popular 90s trends becoming fashionable again.

== In fashion ==
In women's fashion, thigh boots run through cycles in both popularity and design. As referenced by several authors, the popularity of the motion picture Pretty Woman hurt the credibility of thigh boots as wardrobe staples. Nevertheless, in any fall fashion season, one or more designers and retailers will take a chance on their appeal.

Like shoes in general, fashion thigh boots are marketed through several different channels. A key differentiator among these channels is the price point and construction:

- Couture fashion designers
- Fashion designers
- Couture shoe designers
- Boutique brands
- Fashion and shoe retailers

Couture fashion designers marketing thigh boots will vary from year to year. Introducing a boot model is typically tied to the designer's theme for the line. These boots will typically be marketed at the highest price point for thigh boots and, usually, for shoes in general. Fashion designers market similarly, though at a lower price point.

A number of couture shoe design houses regularly include thigh boots in their collections, and the price point will be at a premium, just as with the couture fashion designers. Examples of these designers are:

- Manolo Blahnik
- Jimmy Choo
- Christian Louboutin
- Sergio Rossi (of Gucci Group)
- Stuart Weitzman
- Giuseppe Zanotti (of Vicini S.p.A.)

Couture fashion designers regularly use the shoe design houses to design the boots and shoes for their collections.

Thigh boots are a regular staple of several Italian boutique brands, including:

- Gianmarco Lorenzi
- Left and Right
- Le Silla
- Loriblu
- Icône

The price point for these boots can be very high, particularly at retail boutiques, but will vary more than for couture designers. Some brands are available through eBay sellers and clearance sellers at discounted prices. The lowest price tier is typically the fashion retailers. Retailers who regularly market thigh boots in their line include:

- Aldo
- bebe
- Victoria's Secret

=== Autumn 2009 ===
The Autumn 2009 fashion season featured thigh-high boots as a key fashion accessory for the season, resulting in the style being declared a fashion trend in early 2009. Reaching a wider audience through fashion magazine editorials, the footwear style was shown in two different feature layouts in the September 2009 issue of US Vogue. Numerous high street fashion stores featured thigh-high boots in their Autumn 2009 collections, with many fashion designers also featuring them in their ready-to-wear collections.

Miuccia Prada created thigh boots designed for fashion. One version featured garters to suspend the tops from a belt. Stella McCartney designed boots featuring three crotch-length boots with synthetic uppers, in keeping with her animal-friendly practice. All three had snipped toes and extreme stiletto heels, and one featured a multi-patterned, pierced upper.

Other design houses showing thigh boots in their Autumn 2009 lines included:

- Alexander McQueen
- Catherine Malandrino
- Celine
- Chloé
- Gucci
- Halston
- Louis Vuitton

As for the couture shoe designers, Christian Louboutin marketed four different styles in Autumn 2009 – a front-lacing mid-thigh length with sculpted heel and hidden platform (Supra Fifré), a crotch-length, skin-tight boot with hidden platform, a chunky mid-thigh boot (Contente), and a chunky platform mid-thigh boot. In addition to one heeled thigh boot featuring an elastic cuff just above the knee and two pairs of flat over-the-knee boots in their couture line, Jimmy Choo's limited edition capsule collection for H&M featured a mid-thigh black leather boot with a four-inch heel.

== Fetish ==
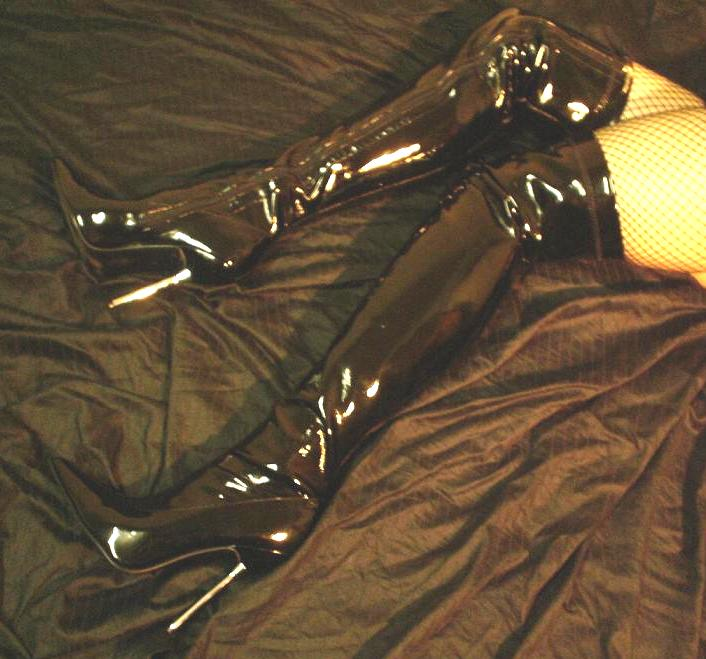
Black vinyl fetish thigh-high (or thigh-length) boots

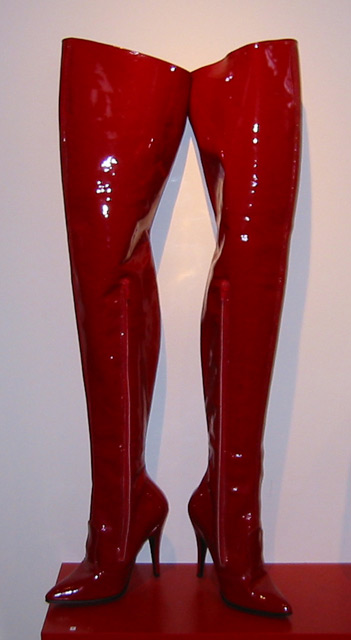
Red vinyl fetish thigh boots as art

Thigh boots as articles of fetish clothing date back to at least the 1950s when Irving Klaw used them in the costuming of the women in his erotic photography. Since that time, they have been a staple of fetish and adult photography. For instance, Bob Guccione photographed the 1982 Penthouse Pet of the Year, Corinne Alphen, in a pair of black leather thigh boots for her feature layout. Similarly, Dwight Hooker photographed the Playboy 25th Anniversary Playmate, Candy Loving, in white leather over-the-knee boots for her layout.

Until the 2000s, fetish thigh boots were generally distinguished from fashion boots by being more extreme in many design dimensions, particularly heel height and platform height. In the late 2000s, this trend slowly changed as some couture designers, particularly Christian Louboutin, experimented with more extreme designs in their shoes.

== Iconography and symbolism in motion pictures ==
Motion pictures in which thigh boots were prominent in an actress' wardrobe include:

- In the 1990 film Pretty Woman, the protagonist, Vivian Ward (played by Julia Roberts), wears her black vinyl thigh boots throughout much of the first part of the movie as a symbol of her role as a prostitute.
- In the 2006 film The Devil Wears Prada, the protagonist, Andy Sachs (played by Anne Hathaway), completes her ugly-duckling-to-swan transformation by strutting confidently into her employer's offices wearing a pair of Chanel black leather thigh boots. Andy's wardrobe for this scene and the rest of the movie was styled by noted costumer, stylist, and designer Patricia Field.
- In the live-action films 101 Dalmatians and 102 Dalmatians, Glenn Close (Cruella) wears thigh high red PVC and thigh / crotch high black PVC boots respectively. Her boots end up stained in molasses and mud.

== See also ==
- List of boots
- List of shoe styles
- Boot fetishism
- Fuck-me shoes
- Jackboot
- Go-go boot
- Knee-high boot
- Over-the-knee boot
