= Lionel Bussey =

British mechanical engineer and footwear collector

- A pair of ladies' boots made from red glacé kid leather donated to the Victoria & Albert Museum by Lionel Bussey. c. 1920. Made in Belgium.
- Born: 6 October 1883
- Died: 5 December 1969 (aged 86); Balham, London
- Occupation: Engineer
- Known for: Collector of footwear

Lionel Ernest Bussey (6 October 1883 – 5 December 1969) was a British mechanical and electrical engineer who amassed a collection of about 600 pairs of women's shoes. All remained unworn, with many still unopened in their boxes with receipts. On his death he bequeathed his collection to "a likely museum or museums". The Victoria & Albert Museum in London accepted 50 pairs, with others going to the Northampton Museum and the Brooklyn Museum.

== Early life and family ==
Lionel Ernest Bussey was born on 6 October 1883 to William Thomas Bussey, a "First Clerk Accountant's Department" at The Gas Light & Coke Co., Westminster, and Mary Louisa Bussey. He had a sister Edith Mary Bussey (born 1891) and another sibling. One of his parents' children had died by 1911. At the time of the 1911 census, the family was living at 65 Sandmere Road, Clapham, London.

== Career ==
Bussey was a "mechanical and electrical engineer (certificated)" and "assistant to a patent agent" according to the 1911 census. He witnessed several patents filed in the United Kingdom and the United States. He was a member of the Institution of Mechanical Engineers and was referred to as a mechanical engineer in the 1936 Probate Calendar.

In his Will, Bussey requested that "all files and papers relating to the matters of United Gas Industries Limited, U.G.I. House, 3–4 Bentinck Street, London W. 1" be offered to them.

== Shoe collection ==
Bussey started collecting women's shoes in about 1914, and by his death in 1969, had amassed about 600 pairs. He bought them all new from higher-end chains such as Dolcis and Lilley & Skinner. All were unworn, and many still unopened in their boxes with receipts.

In his Will, Bussey stated that "the extensive collection of footwear, acquired over the past fifty years or more, shall be offered to a likely museum or museums". The Victoria and Albert Museum (V&A) knew nothing about the collection until Bussey's executors informed them of it. Madeleine Ginsburg, who dealt with the accession for the museum, said: "I had to select quickly because the house was under offer, no doors would lock, and surveyors were wandering around. In the end I brought about 80 pairs back to the museum." The V&A kept 50 pairs, all made between 1908 and 1960, with others going to the Northampton Museum and the Brooklyn Museum. The V&A also accepted back copies of The Sketch for their library, while The London Library received some of Bussey's book collection and the British Film Institute received copies of old film magazines. He left his collection of postage stamps and "all shaving machines and other shaving tackle" to Herbert William Short of 51 Rowfant Road, London.

The V&A's 2015–16 exhibition Shoes: Pleasure and Pain had a large display dedicated to Bussey's collection, including a "tightly laced, pert and pointed, powerfully sexed" pair of scarlet leather knee-high boots from 1920–23. According to the V&A curator, Helen Persson, Bussey had many brown shoes from the 1930s – "he seems to have particularly liked the extreme high heels of that period ... why did he systematically collect wearable shoes ... fetishism might have something to do with it."

Writing in The Guardian, Kathryn Hughes speculated: "The obvious conclusion must be that he spent his evenings either trying on the shoes himself or lovingly fingering their 'tongue', 'throat' and 'waist'." Yet she has her doubts, as he collected a wide range of styles and sizes, and many were never unwrapped: "Doubtless, Bussey lived in simpler times, when a gentleman was free to collect ladies' shoes as unselfconsciously as if they were postage stamps or birds' eggs."

== Death ==
Bussey died on 5 December 1969. His home at the time of his death was 55 Rowfant Road, Balham, London SW17, which was also his mother's home at the time of her death in 1935. As far as is known, he never married. His executors were Barclays Bank and he left an estate valued at £14,836.
