= Knee-high boot =

Style of shoe

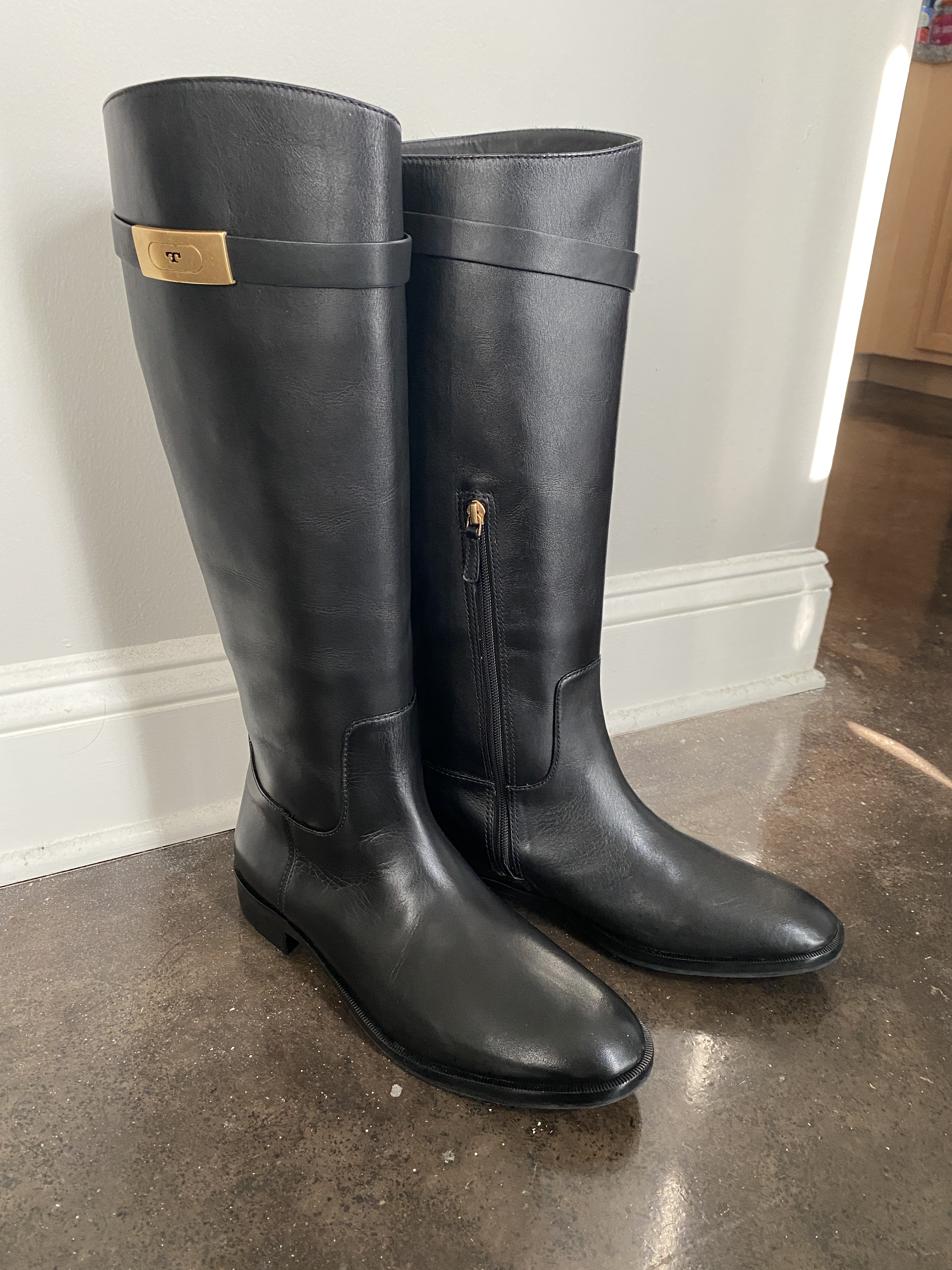
A pair of knee-high leather boots from Tory Burch LLC

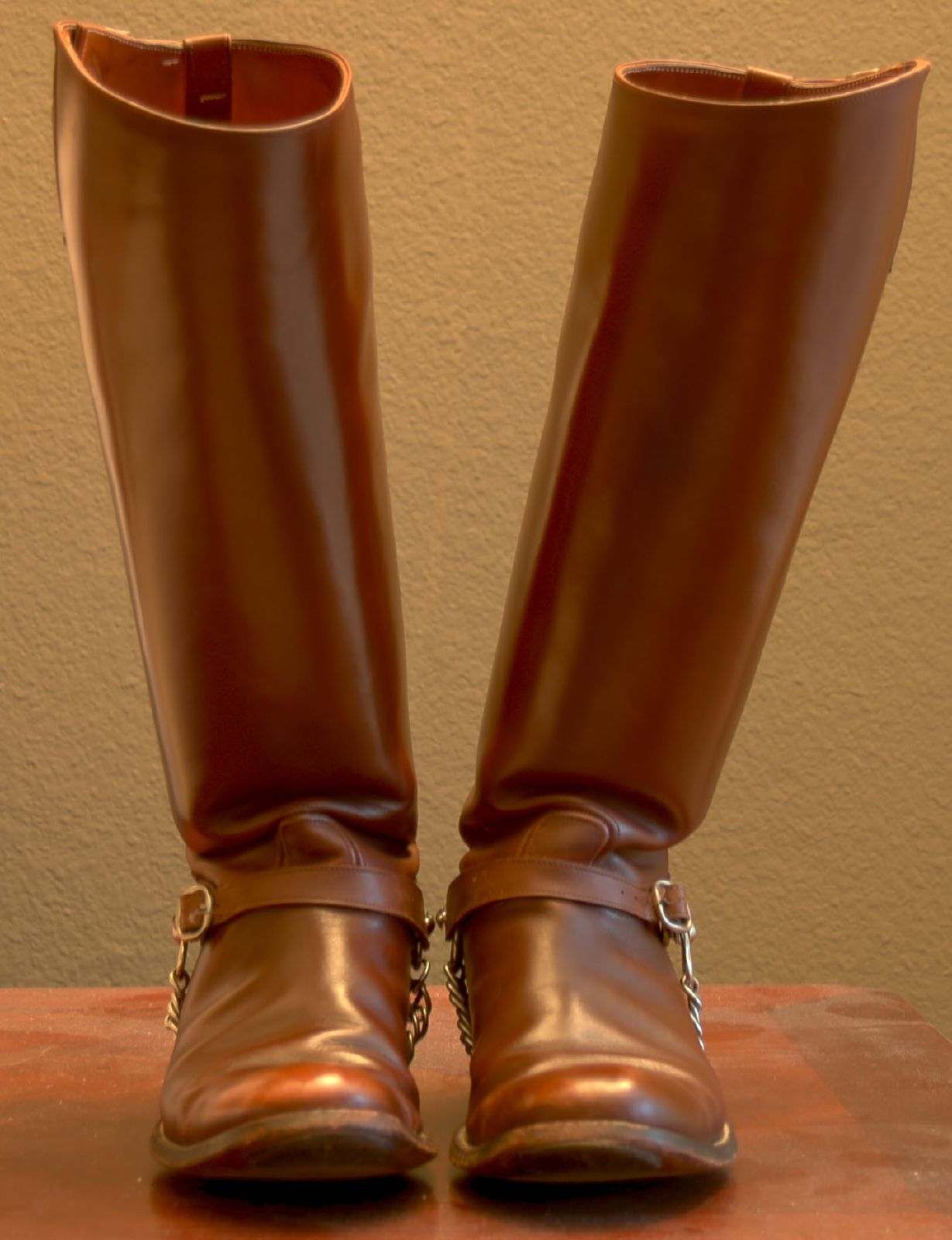
"Senior boots" worn by the senior cadets at Texas A&M University

Knee-high boots are boots that rise to the knee, or slightly thereunder or over. They are generally tighter around the leg shaft and ankle than at the top. Originally made of leather, versions made of a synthetic rubber (PVC, Neoprene, etc.), they are used by fishermen, dairy workers, stable hands, duck hunters, clammers, etc. to protect the feet from water, mud, manure, etc. and to provide traction on slippery surfaces. Most slip on, but there are varieties with buckles or zippers, and those that lace up. They may, or may not, have high heels or platforms.

Knee-high boots are used in the fashion world since at least the 1950s. The fashion boot article discusses this in depth.

Certain types can also be known as muckers or fishing boots.

In university ROTC units, some members wear a dress boot reminiscent of a mounted cavalry boot, such as the boots worn by seniors in the Texas A&M University Corps of Cadets. The leather slip-on boots may be accented with spurs or tassels, or be relatively unadorned. The boots are custom-fit by a cordwainer who takes a mold of the legs of the intended wearer to create a last for the bootmaking process. The unique pair of boots are then carefully sewn onto soles.

Such boots may be extremely difficult to remove, necessitating the use of talcum powder for lubrication, fellow cadets to manually pull the boot, and for elaborate boot pullers.

== See also ==
- List of shoe styles
- List of boots
- Varieties of knee-high boots (excluding fashion boots):
  - Motorcycle boots
  - Riding boots
  - Wellington boots
  - Jackboot
  - Go-go boot
- Other boot heights:
  - Over-the-knee boot
  - Thigh-high boots
