= Shoe fetishism =

Erotic attraction to shoes

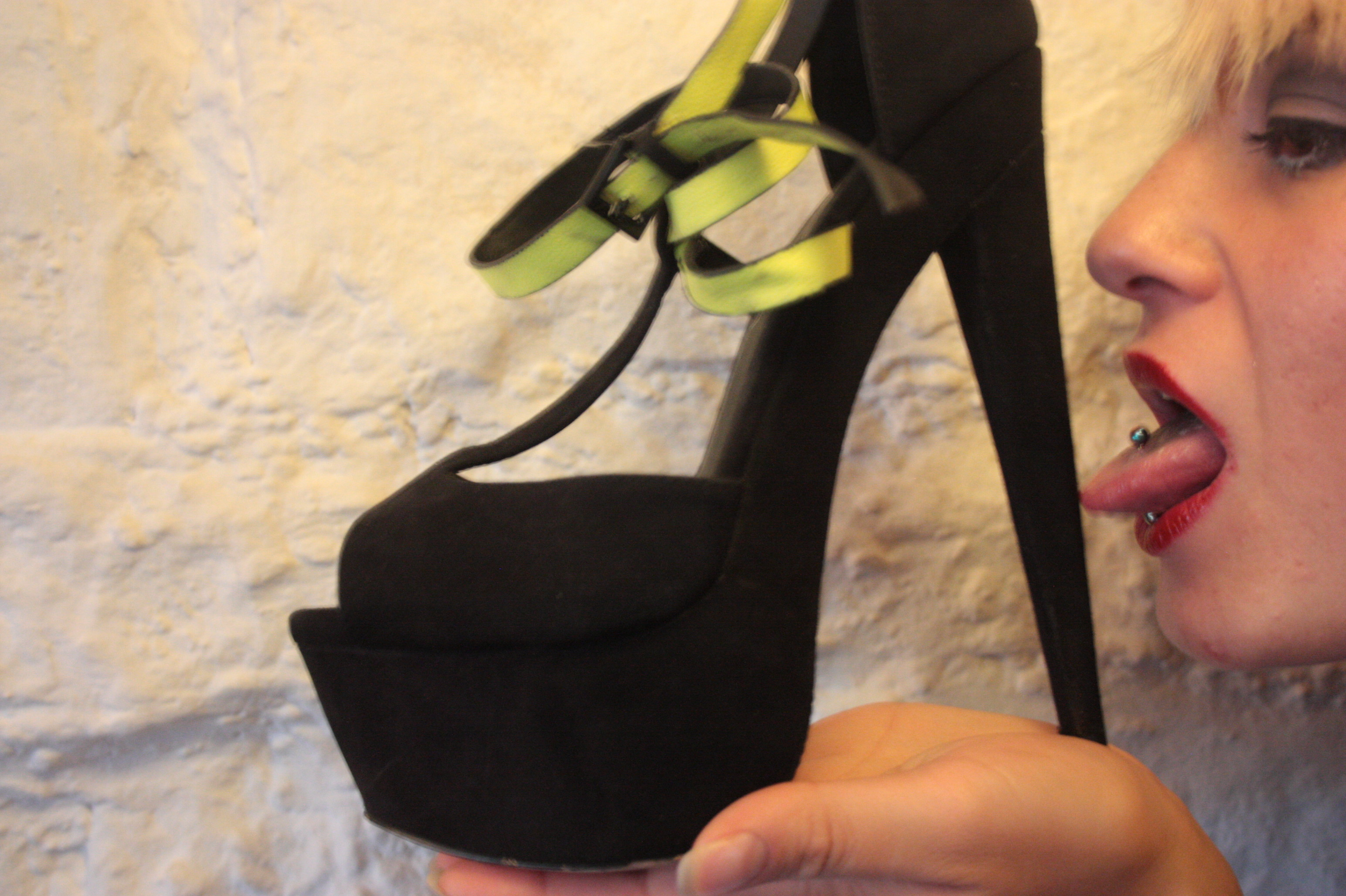
An example of shoe fetishism: a model licking a platform heel.

Shoe fetishism is the attribution of attractive sexual qualities to shoes or other footwear as a matter of sexual preference, or an alternative or complement to a relationship with a partner. It has also been known as retifism, after the French novelist Nicolas-Edme Rétif (1734–1806), also known as Rétif de la Bretonne, who wrote a novel about it (presumably based on his own penchants) called Fanchette's Foot, which preference or penchant seems to have been if not "all the rage" at the time at least known to have been practiced or suffered by more than handsful of somewhat important individuals of that period (pre-Revolutionary France).

Individuals with shoe fetishism can be erotically interested in women's and/or men's shoes.

Almost any type of shoe can be fetishized, depending on the sexual connotation associated with the wearer, for example an entire area of gay subculture is devoted towards the fetishization of sneakers and other forms of athletic footwear.

Another fetishism, which sometimes is seen as related to shoe fetishism, is boot fetishism.

Although shoes may appear to carry sexual connotations in mainstream culture (for example, women's shoes are commonly sold as being "sexy"), this opinion refers to an ethnographic or cultural context, and is likely not intended to be taken literally.

== Prevalence ==
In order to determine the relative prevalences of different types of fetishes, scientists obtained a sample of at least 5,000 individuals worldwide from 381 discussion groups on the internet. The relative prevalences were estimated based on the number of groups devoted to a particular fetish, the number of individuals participating in the groups and the number of messages exchanged.

Using these measures, feet and shoes were found to be the most common target of preferences. This is consistent with an analysis of millions of search queries by users from the United States that were accidentally released during the AOL search data scandal. 64% of the sampled population that had a preference for an object associated with the body had a preference for shoes, boots, and other footwear.

== Popular culture ==
In the 19th century, Central European students drank wine or Champagne from their lady's shoe or bootlet as a sign of devotion. The custom is noted in the opera of 1882, Der Bettelstudent, where Symon drinks Champagne from Laura's shoe at their wedding. In commemoration of this romantic tradition, the French shoe manufacturer Louboutin issued in 2009, a glass shaped like a woman's shoe, which was reviewed critically by the German daily, Die Welt.

The Sex and the City episode, "La Douleur Exquise!", featured a shoe salesman with a shoe and foot fetish, who allowed Charlotte York to have expensive shoes for free simply for allowing him to assist her in trying on various pairs of open shoes whilst he openly complimented her on the state of her feet and offered her foot reflexology. The relationship came to an end when Charlotte figured out she had been getting discounts because she was letting him hold her feet and was further discomforted by the salesman obviously climaxing while assisting her with the sixth pair of the day.

The movie There's Something About Mary featured a former boyfriend of Mary, Dom "Woogie" Wooganowski, played by Chris Elliott, with a shoe fetish. He tried to steal her shoes.

In the animated comedy show Family Guy, the character Glenn Quagmire has a foot and shoe fetish, among other fetishes.

In the movie from 1993 in Spanish, The Bilingual Lover, written and directed by Vicente Aranda from an adaptation from a novel by Juan Marsé, shoe fetishism pervades the whole story.

In the movie from 1995, While You Were Sleeping, starring Sandra Bullock, the main character's landlord, played by Michael Rispoli, has a shoe fetish.

In the Japanese television series from 2000, Bus Stop, the main character, Musashi, has a strong interest in high heels, and at one point repairs a broken high heel for the woman he is pursuing.

== See also ==
- Boot fetishism
- Clothing fetish
- Foot fetishism
- Footjob
- Fuck-me shoes
- Lionel Bussey
- Sexual fetishism
