= Combat boot =

Type of boots designed to be worn by soldiers

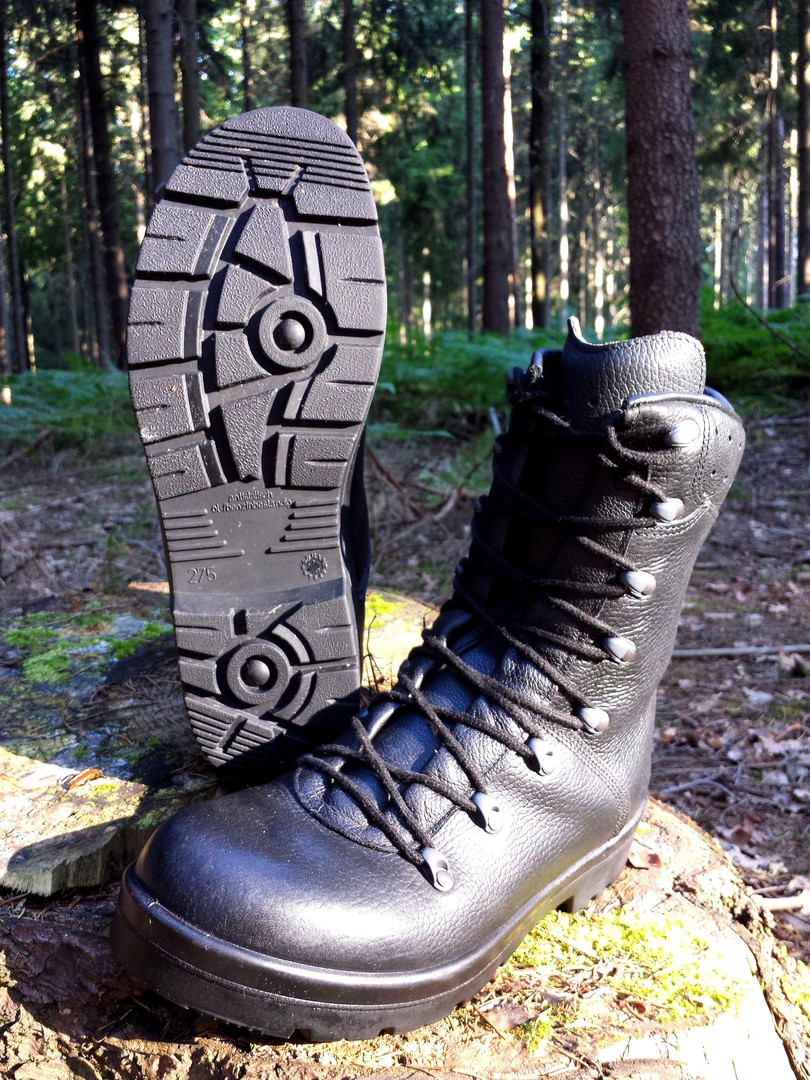
Standard combat boots of Bundeswehr

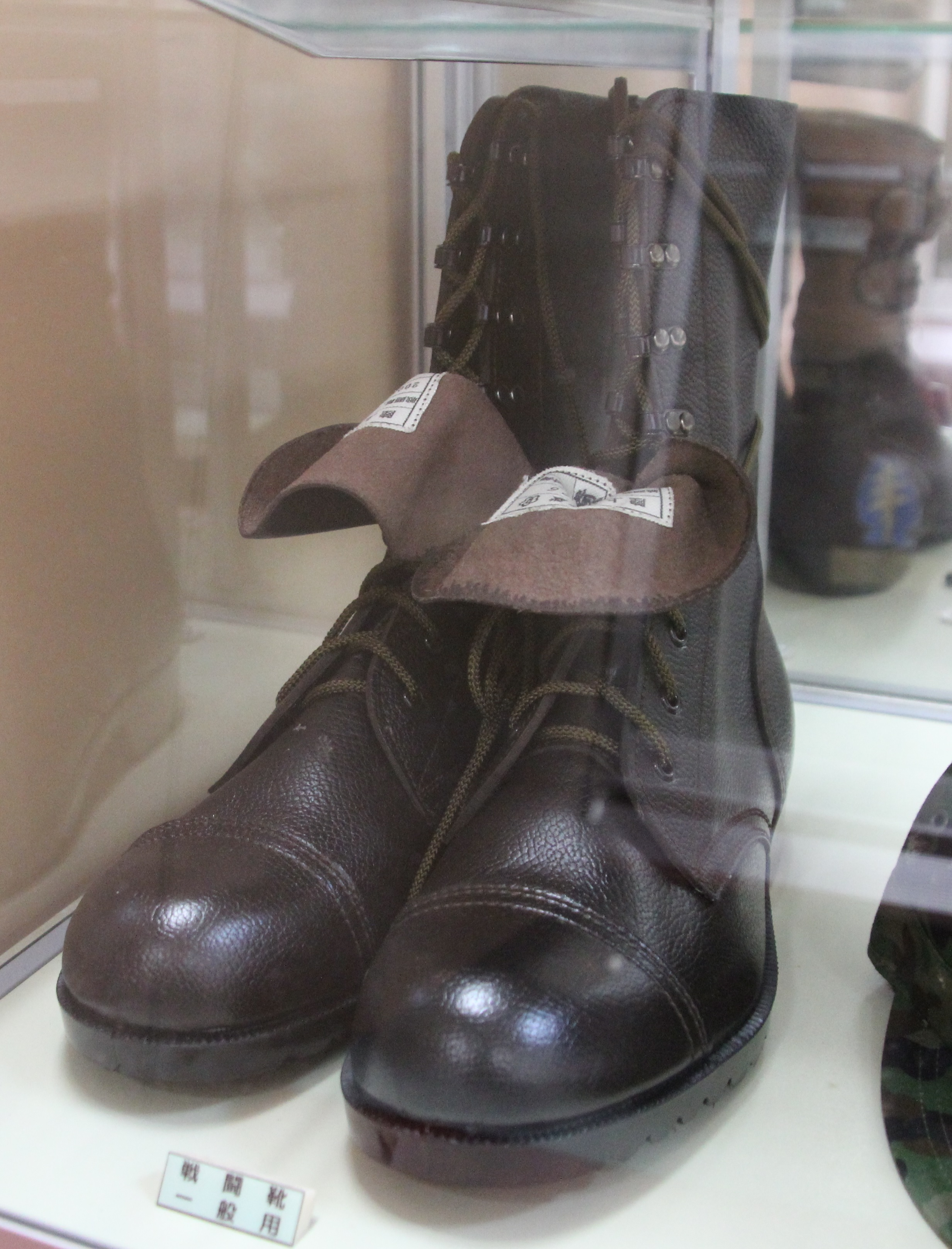
JGSDF boots

Combat or tactical boots are military boots designed to be worn by soldiers during combat or combat training, as opposed to during parades and other ceremonial duties. Modern combat boots are designed to provide a combination of grip, ankle stability, and foot protection suitable for a rugged environment. They are traditionally made of hardened and sometimes waterproofed leather. Today, many combat boots incorporate technologies originating in civilian hiking boots, such as Gore-Tex nylon side panels, which improve ventilation and comfort. They are also often specialized for certain climates and conditions, such as jungle boots, desert boots, and cold weather boots as well as specific uses, such as tanker boots and jump boots.

== History ==
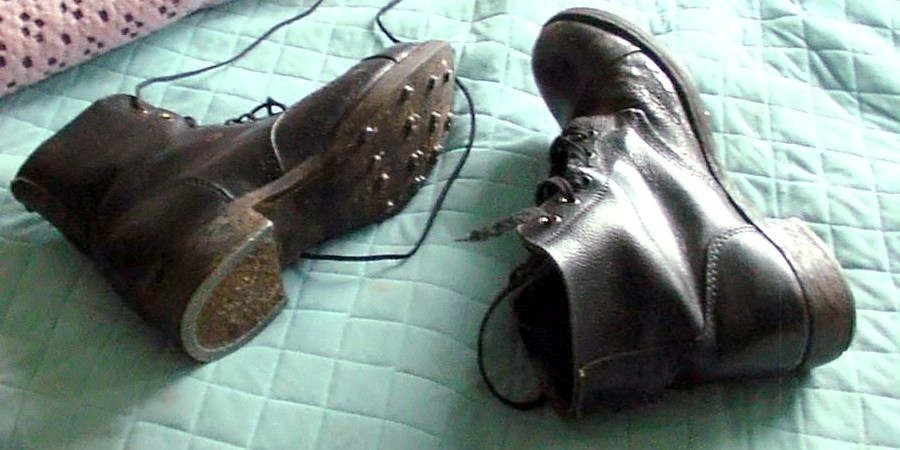
Pair of hobnailed boots

=== Early ===
==== Classical era ====
The legionnaires of the Roman Empire wore hobnail boots, called caligae. By the late 1st century the army began to transition into an enclosed boot called calceus; calcei offered more protection and warmth than the caligae. They quickly became a staple in both Roman military and civilian dress.

==== England and United Kingdom ====
During the English Civil War, each soldier of the New Model Army was issued three pairs of shoes or ankle boots. After every march, the soldier would rotate them to ensure they received even wear. Following the Restoration, shoes and uniforms followed the civilian pattern: shoes with buckles were used by most armies from 1660 until around 1800. Hessian boots were used by cavalry from the 18th century until World War I.

Late in the Napoleonic Wars, the British army began issuing ankle boots that replaced the buckle shoes. These types of boots remained in use throughout the 19th century and were used in conflicts including the Crimean War (1853–1856), First Zulu War (1879), and First Boer War (1880–1881).

These in turn were replaced by ammunition boots, which were used in a variety of similar design patterns from the late 1880s until the late 1960s. The "George Boots" worn with the Officers' dress uniform and mess dress are similar, but they lack the leather counter (heel cap), the toe case (toe-cap) and omit the hobnails, and the steel heel and toe plates.

==== United States ====
Infantry regiments of the US military were equipped with calf-high boots in the War of 1812. From the 1820s until before the American Civil War soldiers were issued ankle-high boots, which were made on straight lasts. There was no "left" or "right" boot; instead, they shaped themselves to the wearer's feet over time. As a result, these boots were very uncomfortable until broken in and often resulted in blisters. They were replaced in 1858 with an improved version generally known as Jeff Davis boots after Jefferson Davis, the Secretary of War who re-equipped the army in the 1850s. These were used until the 1880s.

== 20th and 21st centuries ==
=== Australia ===
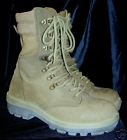
The Australian Terra Combat Boot

Since 2000, the Australian Defence Force, primarily uses the Redback Terra Combat Boot as a replacement for the Vietnam War-era General Purpose combat boots. It was given a limited number of tests in 1999, and was later distributed in 2000. Despite the boot's general aptitude for the tasks which the ADF had first put it in place for, it still had major flaws. 90% of all negative feedback from soldiers was about its inappropriate sizing, having only 43 different sizes. Many also claimed that its sole would rot under worst-case tropical circumstances. Various military personnel have also used Rossi boots.

In mid 2013 a boot trial was undertaken by the ADF to find a replacement for the issued Redback Combat Boot. Boots trialled included updated versions of the Redback Boot as well as various off the shelf boots. At the conclusion of the trial the Danner TFX 8 was selected as the new ADF combat boots: they were comfortable in hot weather and provided good support. However these were found to fail prematurely and were never issued on a large scale.

As a result, Redback were tasked with once again providing a range of combat boots to the ADF including a General Purpose boot, a Jungle Style boot and a Flame Resistant boot. These boots are being issued on a very limited basis and are currently undergoing limited testing. However early reports are not favourable with complaints of failing eyelets and lack of water resistance. Danners are still being retained as a 'Desert' boot or for those who don't fit the current boot.

As of December 2017 the Redback Terra style combat boot is still the standard issue combat boot.

=== Argentina ===
In the early 20th century, Argentine soldiers wore hobnail boots with leather gaiters as well as jackboots. The combat boots worn during the Falklands War came with durable stitched rubber soles. These boots continue to be worn today in addition to the later pattern with "EA" stamped on the leg.

=== Belgium ===
Belgian combat boots are marked by the abbreviation "ABL" (Armée Belge / Belgisch Leger), i.e. "Belgian armed forces" in French and Dutch languages. The soles of Belgian combat boots have different markings, according to the soles manufacturers: Rugak, Rubex and Solidor (models of 1970-s). Leather uppers have markings of "GESKA" ("Geska" NV) or "ARWY NV". Belgian Combats of the years 1970-90s come with stitched rubber soles. Later pattern made by Urban Body Protection International and come with British type "tyre tread" soles.

=== France ===
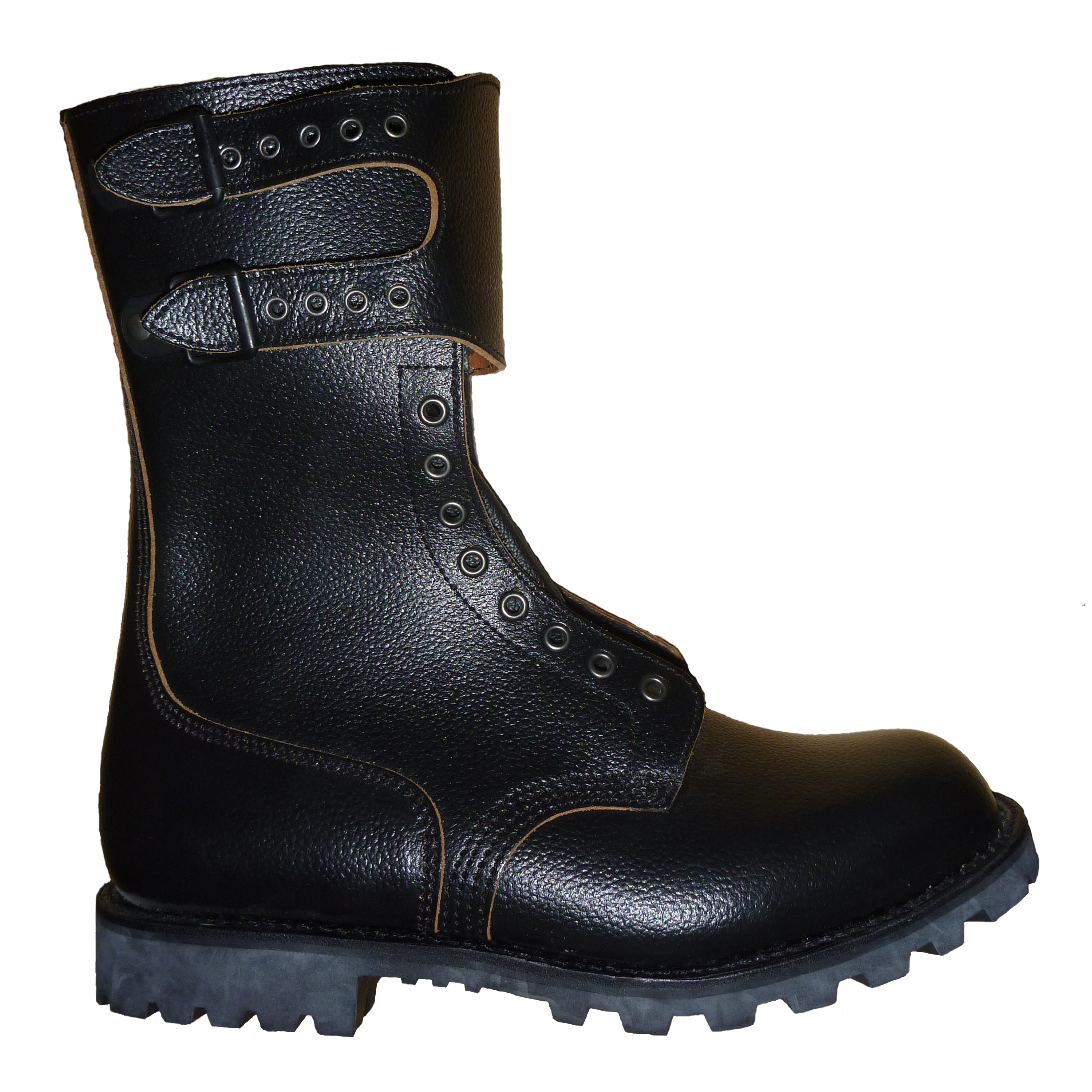
Brand new Mle 1965 combat boots made of shined black leather with direct molded soles.

Combat boots of the French army are nicknamed "rangers" because of their similarity to the M 43 American model. Since the end of World War 2, three models have been manufactured. The first model was based on the 1952 combat ankle-boots on which a leather high-top cuff with two buckles were added. It was made of sturdy but very stiff brown colored cowhide leather. It was called "brodequin à jambière attenante Mle 1952" and was widely distributed from 1956 on, in priority to airborne troops engaged in Algeria. In 1961, a simplified version was introduced, the boot and the leather cuff being made in one piece. In 1965 a new version of the 1961 model was introduced made of shined black grained leather more flexible than the original one. Their soles were of a direct molded type. In 1986 a transitory model with laces and enhanced waterproofing was experimented with under the designation "combat boots model F 2" but was not adopted. The first two models had to be blackened with colored grease and shoe polish. They were issued to French soldiers; including Foreign legionnaires, until the beginning of the 1990s, and then were kept in store in case of conflict. A lot of them have been released on the market after the gendarmerie dropped the territorial defense mission at the beginning of the 21st century. A winter model, with laces and a Gore-Tex lining was introduced in 1998. The third model and a winter model are still in service in the French army but are progressively being replaced in operation by more modern Meindl type boots.

By the end of the 2000s, following the FÉLIN equipment program, the venerable Mle 1965 pattern was replaced by a Gore-Tex boot designed by Meindl (based on Meindl "Army Pro" tactical boot and itself derived from "Island" civilian boots) as the main army boot. The boot is known as "Botte Félin" (Felin boot) and, while there are several contractor beyond Meindl for the actual production of the design including historical French boot provider Argueyrolles, the design is colloquially known as "the Meindl". Progressive replacement of Mle 65 was planned starting with combat units sent on missions abroad. In 2014, the German company Haix won the contract to supply French army standard issue shoes with its Nepal Pro model.

=== India ===
The leather combat boots used by the Indian Army "remained unchanged in design for 130 years", other than the addition of a directly moulded sole. Combat boots were manufactured exclusively by the India's Ordnance Factories Board. In 2017, the Ministry of Defence authorized procurement of combat boots from private companies. The Defence Research and Development Organisation is also developing boots which will enable the tracking of soldiers in snowy locations.

=== Japan ===
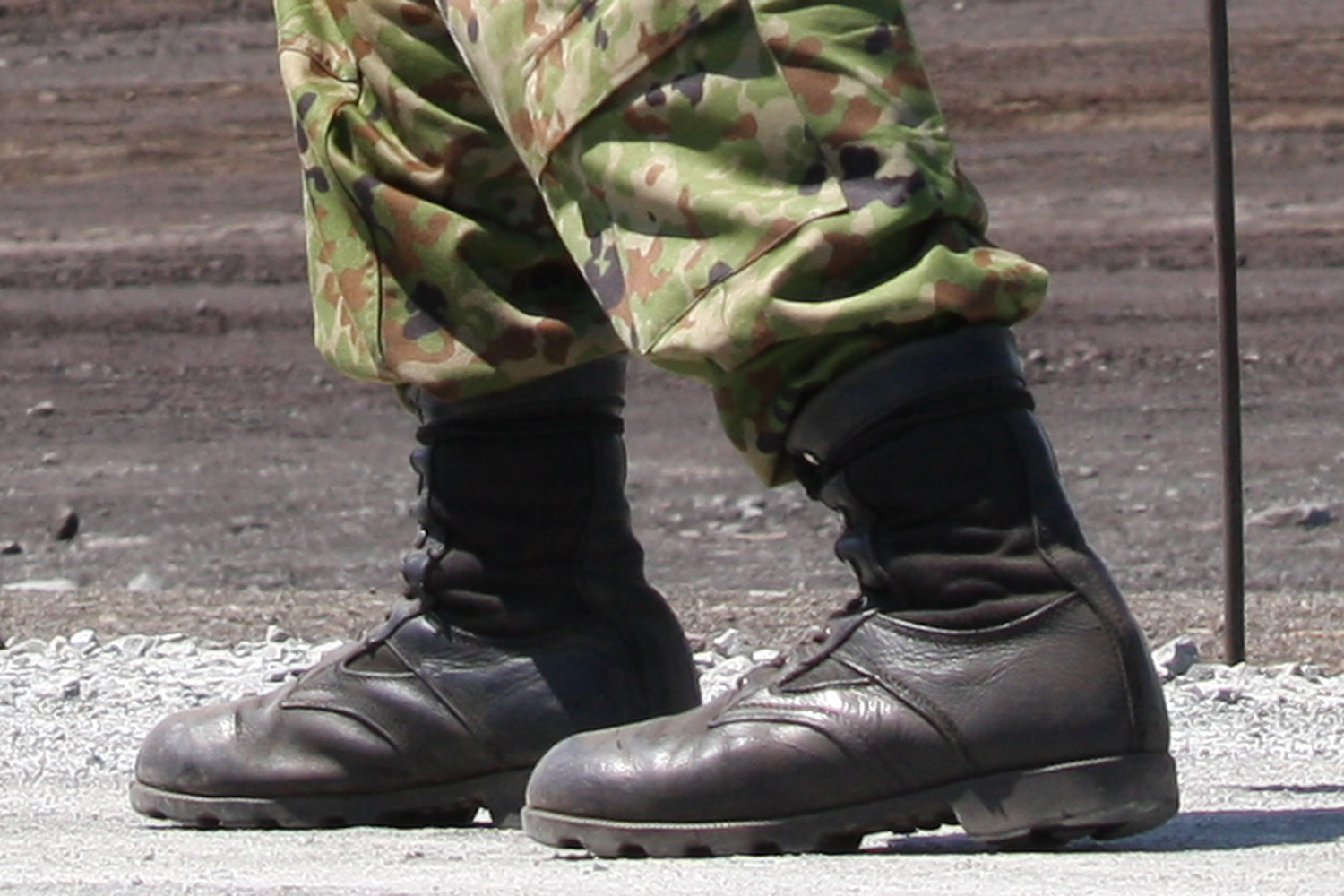
Type 2 combat boots

The Japanese Ground Self Defence Force wear the "half boots" (陸上自衛隊 半長靴/半長靴2型) or Type 2 combat boots. They have came in 3 variants with the first pattern in dark brown leather.

=== Norway ===
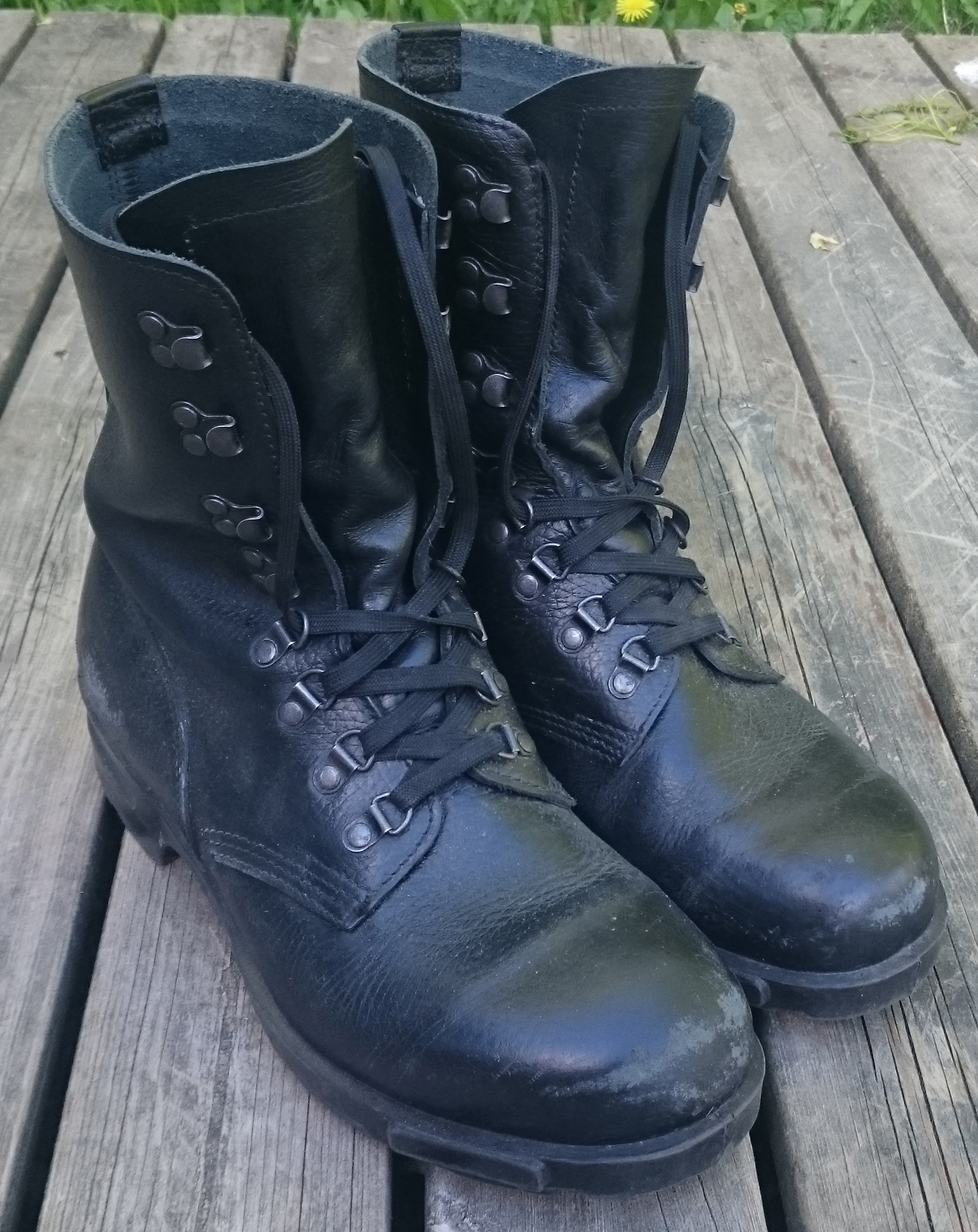
Norwegian M77 Boots by Alfa

The current combat boot used by the Norwegian Armed Forces is the M77. It was introduced in 1977 and is produced by Samelin AS, originally designed for the Finnish Defence Forces. The M77 boot took ten years to develop and strict requirements were set for weight, durability, water resistance, comfort, as well as ease of maintenance and good heat resistance to facilitate quicker drying. The Norwegian army frequently test boots from other manufacturers, but they have not made any plans to change boots for their soldiers. The M77 boot has notches along the sole and in the heel made for the NATO issue skis used by the Norwegian Armed Forces. The bindings for these skis fit the M77 boots as well as the thick waterproof outer shoes they can be put in. The boots can also be used for snowshoes.

=== Russia ===
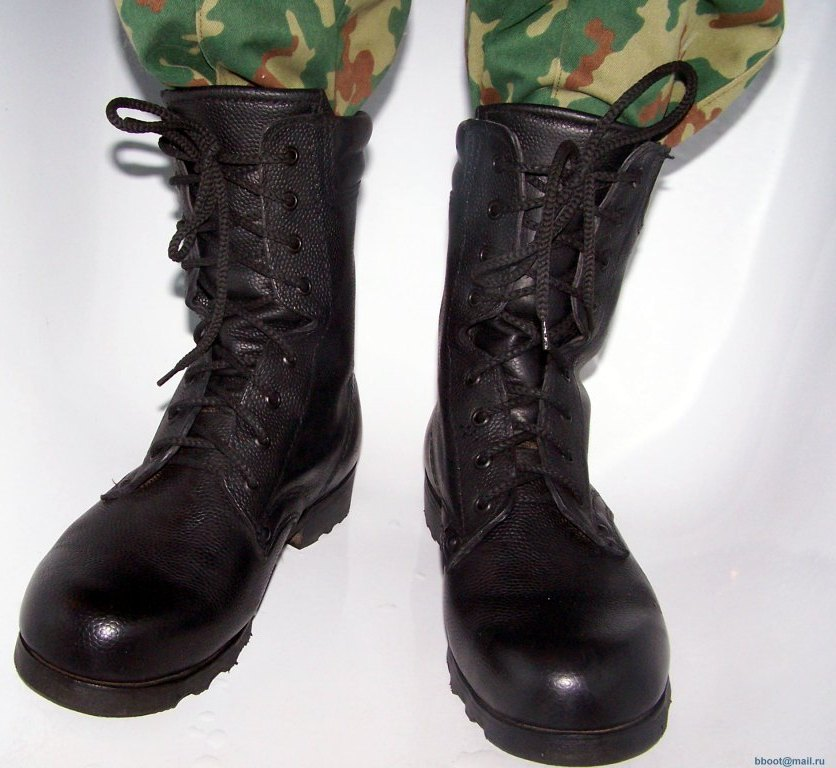
Russian Army boots circa 2008

The Imperial Russian Army used jackboots (called sapogi) until mid-World War One when it adopted ankle boots with puttees as did both sides of the Russian Civil War. The Soviet army used ankleboots with puttees, and then jackboots until the end of its existence and which continued into the Russian Army of today where they are currently mainly used for public duties such as parades and ceremonies. At the end of 2007, the Ministry of Defense of the Russian Federation announced a transition from jackboots to combat boots (Ru:Военные ботинки). The transition process was delayed, among other reasons, for financial reasons: combat boots cost more than jackboots and wear out faster.

=== Sweden ===
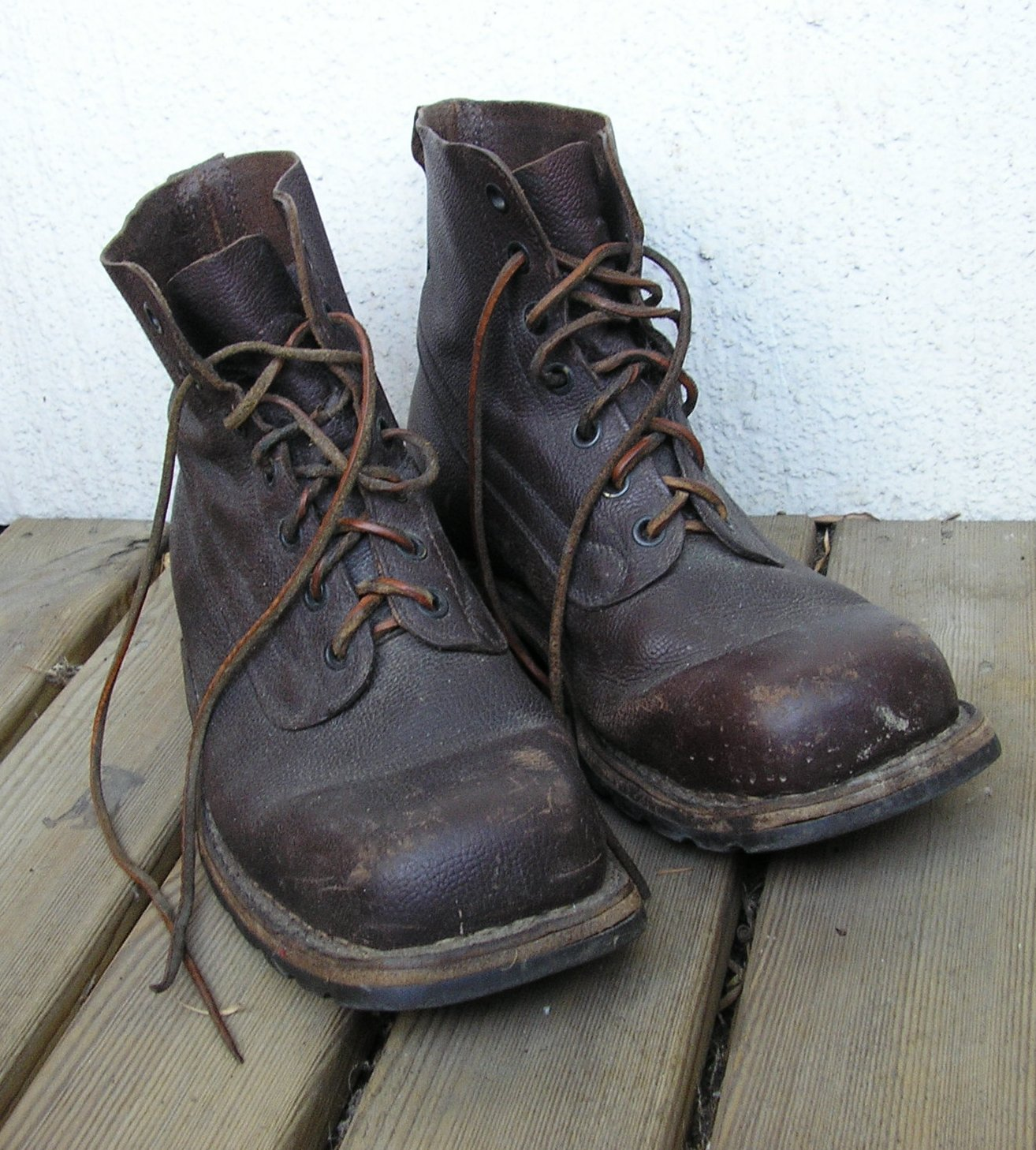
Swedish army boots made by Tretorn. These are NOS from 1968. Over time (and with the use of shoe polish) they turn black.

The military started using boots in 1779. The current model is boot mod. 90 that is designed to be both comfortable and light as well as giving ankle support. They are part of the UNI (Uniform) 90 combat uniform system and are available in a lighter summer version and an insulated winter version with a heavier sole, designed for skiing, using Swedish standard army wood skis.

=== Switzerland ===
The Swiss Armed Forces use three models of combat boots. The KS 90 (from the German Kampfstiefel lit. 'combat boot'), made from black leather and with a flat sole and used for marching on paved roads. The KS14 Schwer ('heavy'), made by the Italian company AKU, is a heavy duty combat boot specially designed for the Swiss Army but also sold to civilians, with metal inserts to protect the foot. Every soldier receives, at the beginning of boot camp, two pairs of KS90 and one pair of KS14. Special Forces corpsmen are outfitted with another custom made boot, developed by the German Meindl for the Swiss Army, the KS08 Schwer AGFA. The KS08 is suitable for every environment, for parachute jumps and fast roping. It allows the mounting of crampons for rock climbing and, like the KS14, it has metal inserts to protect the feet. The army will introduce new boots (KS19 and KS19 Schwer) in the near future.

=== South Africa ===
Members of The South African National Defense Force (SANDF) are issued brown or black combat boots with 18 lace holes, pimple print leather and stitched rubber soles. The brown boots are worn by members of the South African Army and South African Military Health Service, whereas the black boots are worn by members of the South African Air Force and the South African Navy.

Paratroopers (Parabats) wear a variant known as "Jumpers". These boots are taller, having 22 lace holes, and are heavier, due to the steel plate housed within their double soles. The steel plate prevents the foot from flexing during hard landings when parachuting. They are usually polished with red polish. The colour combination of the brown leather with the red polish creates a shade of maroon that matches their maroon berets.

Special Forces (Recces) are issued tan half-combat boots known as "Waxies." These boots are an evolution of the old Rhodesian anti-tracking boots. The boots are ankle height, having 12 lace holes and an ankle strap at the top which is fastened with a buckle. The leather is thin and breathable and has a smooth wax finish, hence the name. The boots are lightweight, and have stitched rubber anti-tracking soles. These soles are completely flat, leaving behind shallow footprints that appear old and faded.

=== Singapore ===
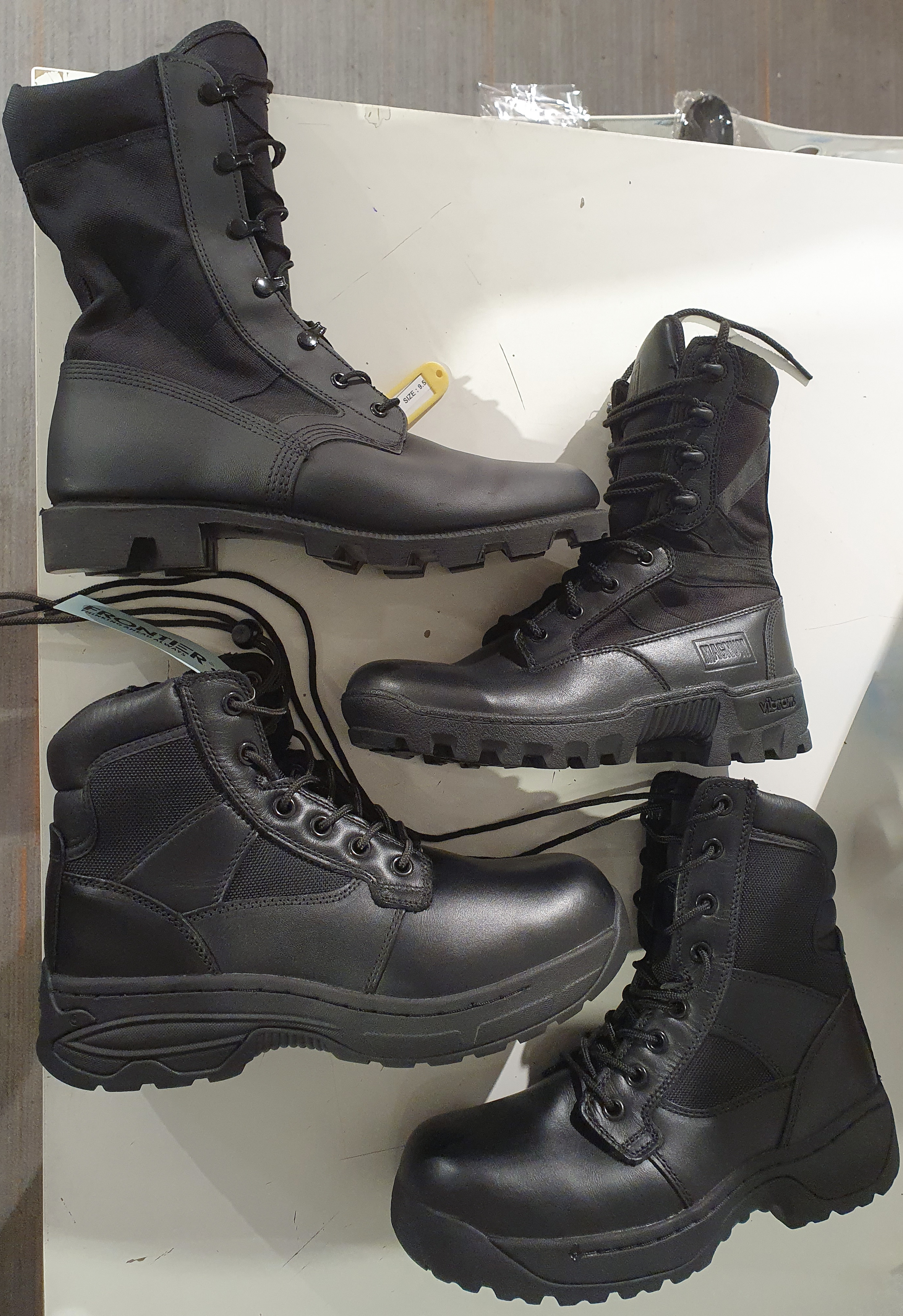
The Singapore Armed Forces combat boots. Top to bottom: Army Combat Boot (ACB), Enhanced Combat Boot (ECB), RSN Combat Safety Boot, RSAF Combat Safety Boot.

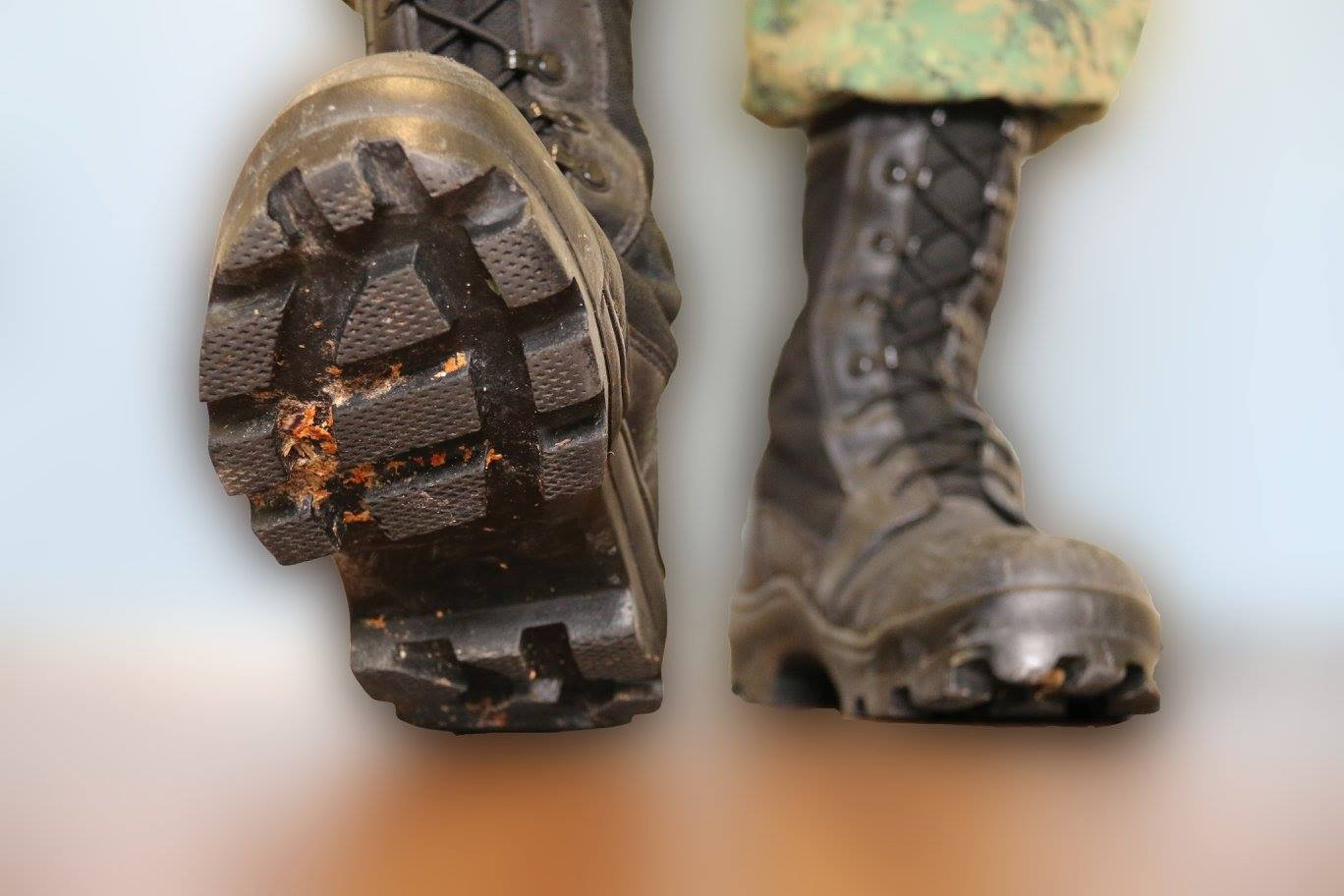
The out-of-production Gore-Tex boots

The Singapore Armed Forces has a few models of combat boots currently produced for its servicemen, namely the Army Combat Boot (ACB), Enhanced Combat Boot (ECB), RSAF Combat Safety Boot, and RSN Combat Safety Boot.

New enlistees are generally issued the ACB, of which there are two variations, one manufactured by Wellco Peruana, a Peruvian brand, and another manufactured by Altama, an American brand. Both variations have a near-identical construction, with variations in quality. They feature a part-leather, part-fabric construction for breathability, directly molded soles, and two holes that allow drainage of any water that may have entered. The outsoles are designed to suit jungle environments. These boots are similar in design to the U.S. Army hot weather combat boots and jungle boots.

The ECB is the Spartan XTB by Magnum, and is issued to more combat focused units in the Singapore Army, such as the infantry, armoured infantry, guards, and commandos. It has a hybrid leather-fabric upper like the ACB, but with lighter weight, fully stitched cupsoles, and an outsole design that is more suited for both urban and jungle environments.

Both the ACB and the ECB have been in use since December 2016.

Past versions of boots issued within the Singapore Armed Forces include a full leather upper boot with a reinforced toecap (in service until 1993), an improved version that removed the reinforced toecap, reducing weight, and had improved insoles that provided more support and offered better hygiene (in service 1993–2002), the 'Gore-Tex' boots, a revised design with parts of the upper made of Gore-Tex, making it waterproof (in service 2002–2012), and the 'Frontier' boots (named after the manufacturer), of which the Gore-Tex material was replaced with a porous nylon fabric for quick drying, and featured water drainage holes, thus no longer making the boots waterproof (in service 2012–2016). The Frontier boots also had a redesigned sole that was supposed to give improved agility and comfort.

The Frontier boots had received criticism from some Singapore Army reserve conscripts who were previously issued the Gore-Tex boots. Unlike its predecessor, the Gore-Tex boots, which were padded and waterproof, the Frontier boots did not feature the padding, and instead had an added ankle support strip, which some servicemen claimed made the boot more uncomfortable. The revised design also lost its waterproof properties, which also drew criticism. However, it allowed water to drain out of the boot after a river-crossing. Also, the boot became more ventilated and thus cooler with the revised design. Durability was also an issue in both the second Generation Gore-Tex and also some batches of the Frontiers. At times, the sole of the boot will come apart since it is only glued to the shell of the boot and not stitched. Some servicemen would also find their Frontier boots' stitching coming apart after some weeks of usage, or even the soles disintegrating and cracking after prolonged use or storage. The succeeding ACB addressed the durability issue with directly molded soles, and is also purportedly more comfortable.

Non-combat ground crew and airbase personnel of the Republic of Singapore Air Force are issued the RSAF Combat Safety Boots, manufactured by Frontier, for use in airbases. The RSAF boots feature padded sides, an outsole that is more suited to urban environments, a side-zip with a Velcro fastener, and a composite toe. Aircrew are instead issued the 800ST flight boots by Belleville that are waterproof, have a full leather upper, are steel-toed, and have a similar design to the U.S. Army temperate weather combat boots, albeit with different materials. Personnel in the combat focused 'Ground Based Air Defence' units, along with security troopers tasked to guard airbases, are issued boots and uniforms as if they were in the army.

The Republic of Singapore Navy servicemen are issued the modified version of the RSAF's safety boots. The modifications include the two water outlets (similar to the Singapore Army's standard issue boots), and a reduction in height from a high-cut boot to a mid-cut.

=== Spain ===
Before 1979, the Spanish army had issued triple-buckled boots, with full lace-up boots becoming common from 1984 to 1986. During the 1980s Spain changed boot suppliers and had many variations of design including Vibram or Panamá sole, buckles or laces, and eyelets or speed lace. There were three common models:

- Regular – The general-issue boot used for instruction and campaign, it had a medium sole thickness and a few cleats. Smooth-soled versions fell into disuse over time, leaving only the instruction and campaign model.
- Walking – A lighter-constructed version of the regular boot with no cleats. It had a distinctive peculiarity as a boot to wear comfortably in the street, on flat ground, and was commonly known as vulgarmente (crude or vulgar) for its thin soles.
- Paratrooper – A boot exclusive to paratrooper units. It lacked the issue triple buckles (due to the hazard of hooking the parachute lines), and was slightly higher with extra shin-to-foot support and reinforced toe and heel.

This was the general approach in the late 1970s and early 1980s. During this period the manufacturer, Segarra, had various major problems which prevented regular deliveries on their supply contract with the Ministry of Defence. This eventually led to Segarra's closure, with Imipiel chosen as an alternative provider.

Imipiel-manufactured boots were copies of the Segarra models but proved to be inferior, with poorly-attached soles that opened and peeled-off with relative ease, greatly shortening their useful lifetime. In an attempt to overcome the debonding problem, Imipiel changed the outsole, removing the cleats, and incorporated "Panama" type soles.

The Ministry initiated parallel studies for the final adoption of a new model boot, accepting new concepts on the original boot of instruction and campaign and benefits of the paratrooper-styled boot.

=== United Kingdom ===
During the First World War, the British army introduced a variation of ammunition boot designated Boots, Type B5. These were made from brown leather and generally lacked toecaps. They featured hobnailed soles.

The British Army introduced the DMS (Direct Moulded Sole) ankle boot in 1958. This had a moulded plastic sole and was externally similar to the World War II Ammunition Boot. However, they featured a low sideless tongue which allowed water to get in over the top of the foot. Once water had got into the boot, it would evaporate through the top of the boot but not through the plastic sole, thereby keeping the foot wet and accelerating the development of trench foot. Although mesh insoles were issued to combat this, they were themselves fragile and could lead to 'burning' of the sole of the foot, with the result that most soldiers used commercially available sports-shoe insoles instead. This type of boot continued in service until the mid-1980s, after its unsatisfactory characteristics became a matter of public concern owing to the severe cases of trench foot incurred during the Falklands War. The DMS boot was worn with anklets or wind-around puttees.

The immediate successor of the DMS boot was the "Boot, Combat, High" (BCH). These were essentially the DMS boots, but made of smooth leather (as opposed to pebble grain leather), lacking toecaps and extended up to the calf. The design of the boots could cause acute tendonitis. A MkII version was introduced to solve this. One advantage was that it was not supposed to be 'bulled' to a mirror shine.

The Combat Assault Boots (CAB) were current issue until 2012, and were used primarily for combat training and general service, although privately purchased boots were often deemed acceptable as long as they were made of black leather. The Foot Guards still use modified ammunition boots. These boots, being primarily made of leather, can be brought to a high shine for the ceremonial purpose, although boots used as every-day military footwear tend to be left comparatively dull, but clean.

Various levels of shine can be achieved with CAB. However, when on exercise (in the field) or on operations, soldiers are only required to shine their boots to combat high.

Jungle boots supplied by various manufacturers are also commonly worn in barracks due to the ability to carry out loaded marches faster and for longer.

From 2012 Armed Forces personnel have a newly designed range of brown combat boots to replace the black and desert combat footwear they previously wore. Personnel have the choice of five different boots depending on where they are based and what role they are in.

- Desert Combat – worn by dismounted troops conducting medium to high levels of activity in desert type environments with temperatures exceeding 40 degrees Celsius.
- Desert Patrol – worn by drivers/armoured troops conducting lower levels of activity in desert type environments exceeding 40 degrees Celsius.
- Temperate Combat – worn by dismounted troops for medium to high levels of activity in temperate (European) climates.
- Patrol – worn by mounted troops (drivers/armoured troops) taking part in lower levels of activity in temperate (European) climates.
- Cold Wet Weather – worn by dismounted troops for medium to high levels of activity in temperatures down to –20 degrees Celsius.

Each of the five boot types comes in two different styles, so personnel can wear whichever one is more comfortable for them. The new brown boots, which have been developed to match the MTP uniform worn by Service personnel, are made in two different fittings designed for the first time to take account of the different shapes of men's and women's feet. The previous black boots continued being worn with most non-camouflage uniforms as well as by units on parade in full dress uniform, such as regiments performing ceremonial duties in central London.

As of 2018, the five categories previously issued were changed to simplify the choices available. The Italian manufacturer AKU now supply their Pilgrim model as an option for a high liability boot alongside Altberg.

=== United States ===
The 1917 Trench Boot was an adaptation of the boots American manufacturers were selling to the French and Belgian armies at the beginning of World War I. In American service, it replaced the Russet Marching Shoe. The boot was made of tanned cowhide with a half middle sole covered by a full sole. Iron plates were fixed to the heel. It was a great improvement, however it lacked waterproofing. It soon evolved into the 1918 Trench Boot, also called the Pershing Boot after General John Pershing, who oversaw its creation. The boot used heavier leather in its construction and had several minor changes from the 1917 Boot.

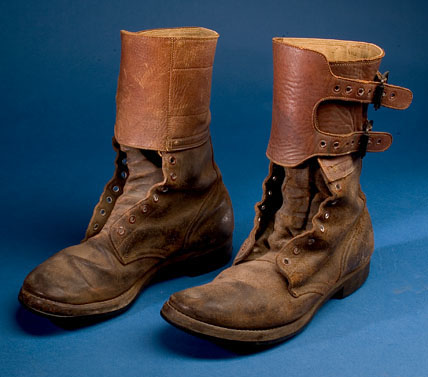
M-1943 Combat Service Boots.

The first true modern combat boots in the US Army, officially titled "Boots, Combat Service", were introduced in conjunction with the M-1943 Uniform Ensemble during World War II. They were modified service shoes, with an extended, rough-out or, more commonly, a smooth leather high-top cuff added. The cuff was closed using two buckles, allowing the boots to replace the existing service shoes and leggings worn by most soldiers with a more convenient and practical solution. The boots, and the service shoes from which they were made, had a one piece sole and heel, made from molded synthetic or reclaimed rubber. These "double buckle" boots were worn through the Korean War as a substitute for the Boots, Russet, Leather Lace Up introduced in 1948. The first type of Combat Boots, or Combat Tropical boots were based on the "buckle boot" design and worn during the early parts of the Vietnam War.

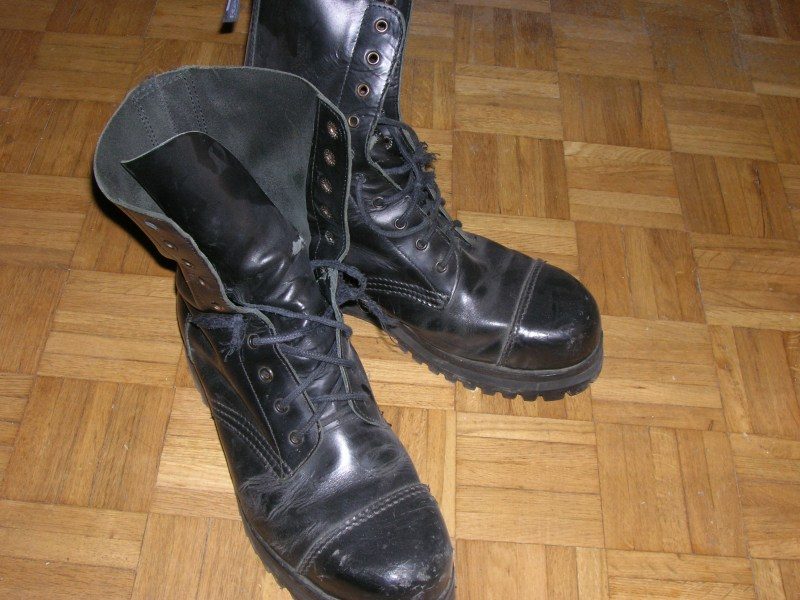
Older paratrooper boots

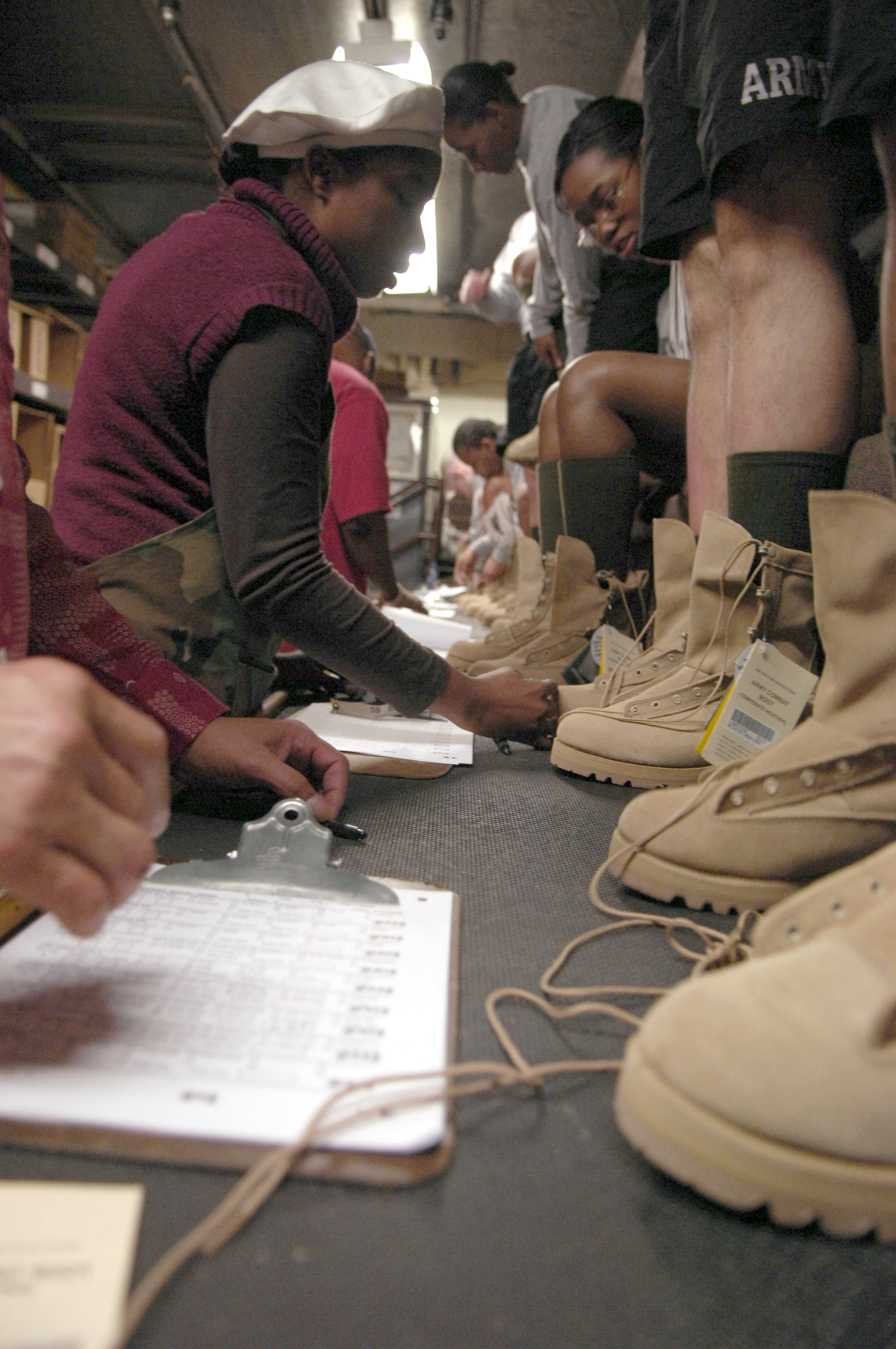
U.S. Army soldiers are issued their boots

In 1957, the US Army switched to shined black combat boots, although the transition to black boots was not completed until late in the Vietnam War, which also saw the introduction of the jungle boot. Both of these boots had a direct molded sole. The jungle boot had a black leather lower and an olive drab canvas (later nylon) upper. Black boots continued to be worn following Vietnam, with the M81 BDU, although non-shine boots were considered by the Army. As the BDU was replaced with the MCCUU, Army Combat Uniform, and Airman Battle Uniform the services moved to more practical, non-shine footwear. The only current military service mandating shined black combat boots are the United States Naval Sea Cadet Corps, the Auxiliary Cadet Detachment of the Naval forces, and the Civil Air Patrol, the Auxiliary of the U.S. Air Force, in conjunction with the BDU utility uniform.

As the United States Marine Corps made the transition from its utility uniform to the MCCUU, they discarded shined black combat boots, and switched to more functional tan rough-out (non-shine) combat boots, with either hot weather or temperate weather versions. The standard-issue boot is the Bates Waterproof USMC combat boot. Commercial versions of this boot are authorized without limitation other than they must be at least 8 inches (20 cm) in height and bear the Eagle, Globe, and Anchor on the outer heel of each boot. Beginning on October 1, 2016, Marine Corps personnel were authorized to wear various Marine Corps Combat Boot models from Danner, Belleville, McRae and Bates, and Rugged all-terrain boots from Danner.

The United States Army followed suit in 2002 with the introduction of the Army Combat Uniform, which also switched to tan rough-out combat boots, called the Army Combat Boot, and cotton socks. Commercial versions of this boot are authorized without limitation other than they must be at least eight inches in height and are no longer authorized to have a 'shoe-like' appearance. Two versions exist: a 2.5-pound (1.1 kg) temperate weather boot, and a 2-pound (0.9 kg) hot weather (desert) boot. Current manufacturers include (but are not limited to) Altama, Bates, Belleville Boot, McRae, Rocky, Warson Brands/Converse, and Wellco.

The US Air Force used a sage green suede combat boot with its Airman Battle Uniform, although a tan version was authorized until 2011, when the green boot became mandatory. The Airman Battle Uniform was phased out in 2021 and replaced with the Army Combat Uniform in Operational Camouflage Pattern, with the boots authorized only in Coyote Brown.

== Fashion ==
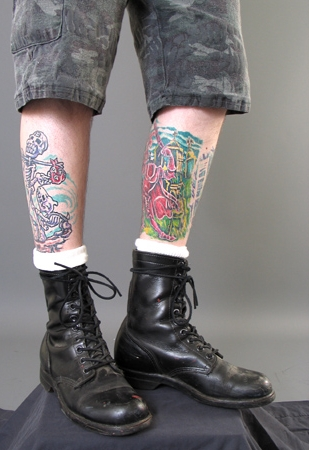
Combat boots worn as fashion apparel.

Combat boots are popular as fashion clothing primarily in the gothic, punk, grunge, heavy metal, industrial, skinhead, and BDSM fashions, and as work boots, but are becoming more and more mainstream. Beyond fashion as such, many individuals choose to wear combat boots simply due to durability, comfort and other utilities, as the boots are specifically designed to be comfortable to wear in a variety of changing conditions for long durations without significant long-term wear. Combat boots have a longer lifespan than fashion boots, which can give them a vintage feel, even after recrafting. For these and other reasons, they can be purchased at military surplus stores.

== See also ==
- List of boots
- List of shoe styles
- Cold weather boot
- Desert Combat Boot
- Jackboot
- Modular Boot System
- Mountain Combat Boot
- Tanker boot
- Jungle boot
- Bovver boot
