= Mountain Combat Boot =

Type of military combat boot

Mountain Combat Boots (MCB) are durable, hiking-style combat boot used by the likes of mountain troops. The boot is designed for rugged terrain and has the ankle stability, support and mobility required in a mountainous environment.

== Users ==
=== Argentina ===
Argentine soldiers have worn Alta Montaña type mountain combat boots during the Falklands war made by El Resero.

=== France ===
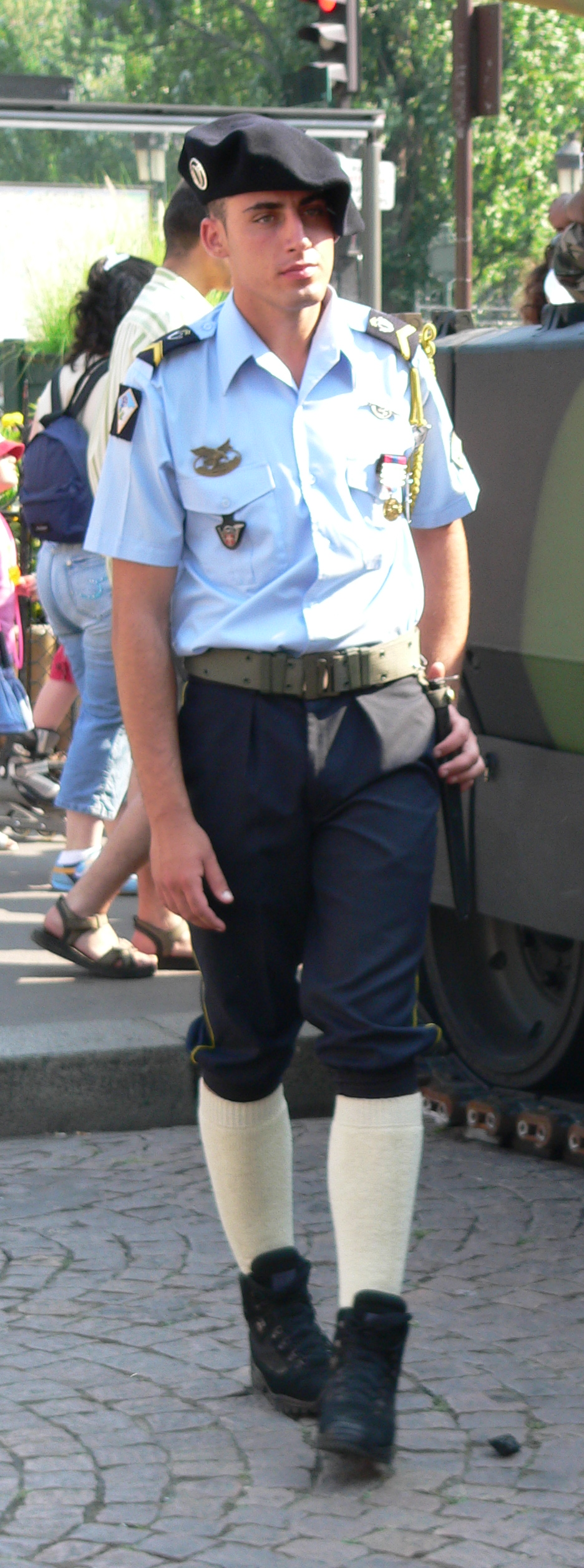
French soldier

The Chasseurs Alpins wear mountain combat boots on parade.

=== Germany ===
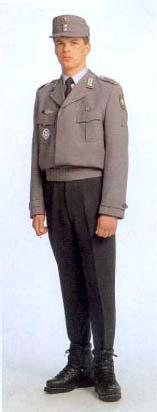
A BW (German) Soldier

The Gebirgsjäger wear mountain combat boots as well as on parade.

=== United States ===
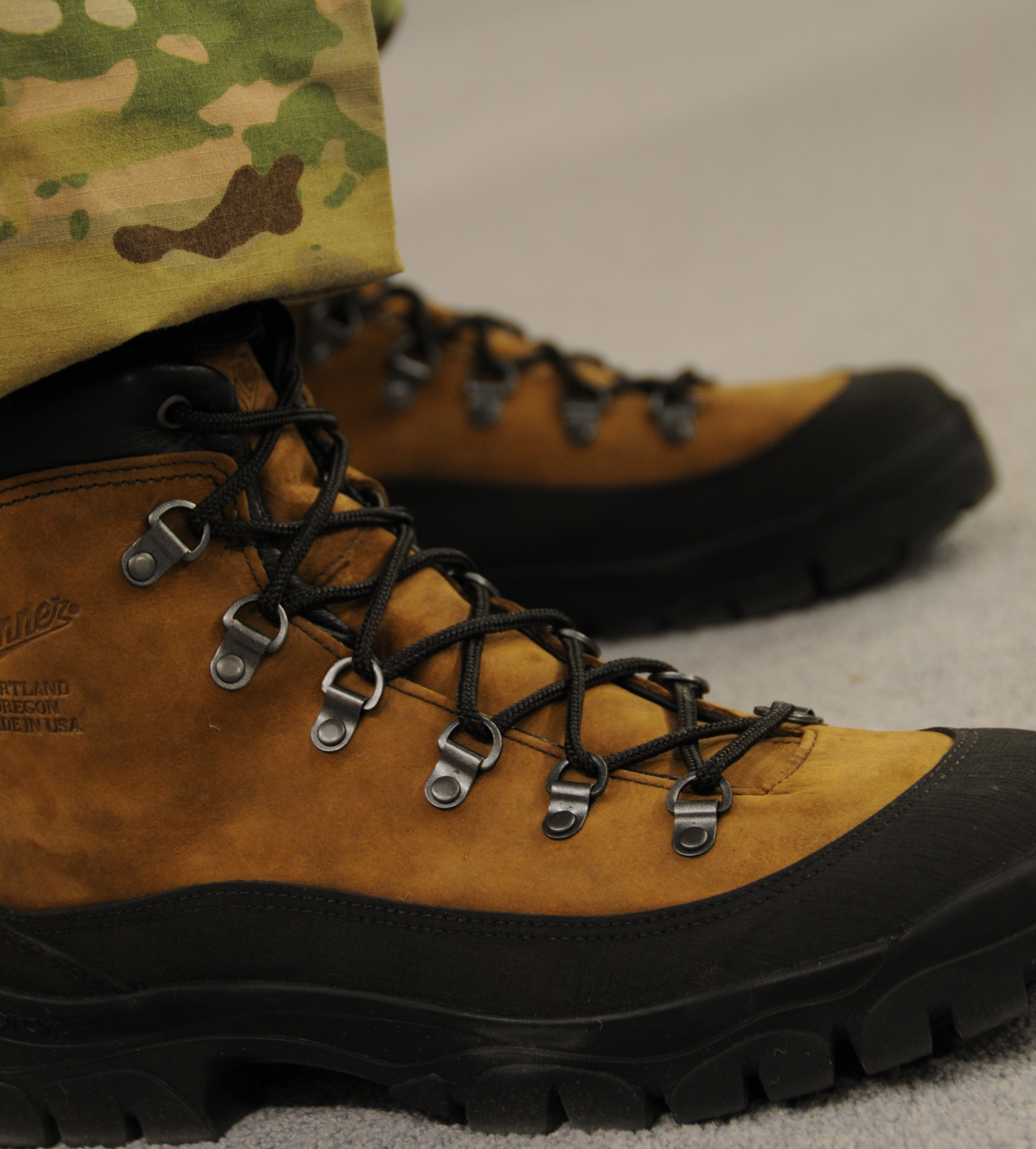
US type Danner Combat Hiker Military Boots

Mountain Combat Boots (MCB) are issued to U.S. Soldiers deploying to Afghanistan as part of the Rapid Fielding Initiative process. Both Hot Weather and Temperate Weather variants of the MCBs have been issued by the Army.

== See also ==
- Army Combat Boot
- List of boots
- List of shoe styles
- Modular Boot System

== Sources ==
This article incorporates work from , which is in the public domain as it is a work of the United States Military.
