= Shit kicker =

Shit Kicker or Shitkicker may refer to:

- A pejorative and slang insult; see Shit § Dominance
- Combat boots, military boots designed for soldiers
- Cowboy boots, riding boots historically worn by cowboys
- Wellington boots, waterproof, almost knee-high boots made from rubber or PVC
- those who wear the footwear listed above: Cowboys or cowgirls and by extension rednecks in general
