= Xtratuf =

Brand of neoprene boots

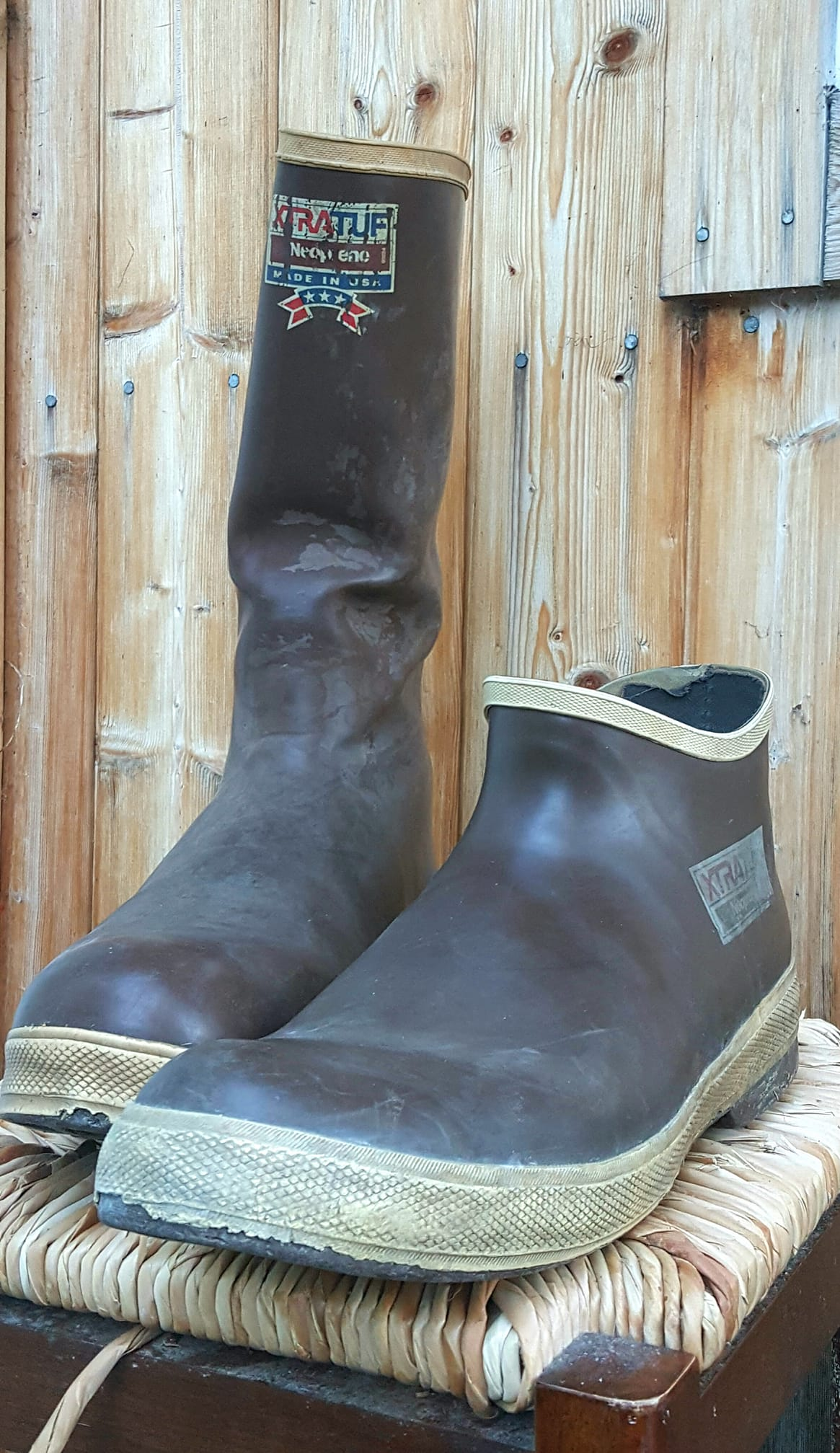
Two well-worn XtraTuf boots, one a full boot and the other an “Alaska sneaker"

XTRATUF is a brand of neoprene boots manufactured by Rocky Brands. First made in Rock Island, Illinois, they are popular throughout Alaska and the Pacific Northwest in general, especially in coastal areas and among fishermen.

== History ==
BF Goodrich first commissioned Norcross Safety Products to manufacture XTRATUF boots in Rock Island, Illinois in the 1950s. The boot was originally designed for commercial fisherman: the chevron outsole is slip-resistant on boat decks, and the neoprene lining keeps fish oils from penetrating through the rubber. Norcross bought the brand from Goodrich in 1985. In May 2008, Honeywell Safety Products acquired Norcross and the brand. The "Made in USA" on the boots was significant: Norcross was the last remaining rubber footwear manufacturer in North America.

At the end of 2011, Honeywell—the corporate conglomerate who purchased the Xtratuf brand in 2008—closed its Rock Island plant and moved production to an existing Honeywell facility in China. Reportedly, 250 to 300 people lost their jobs. Since the move, many users have complained of a dramatic fall in quality. The company responded to initial concerns in quality by offering to replace defective pairs of boots, and by stating that quality issues in initial production runs have been addressed.

In response to public outcry, Alaska Senator Mark Begich even wrote a letter to Honeywell Safety Products asking they bring manufacture of its storied boot back to the US. A Honeywell spokesman remarked at the time production moved to China to keep the company competitive in the global marketplace. In late 2013 the company engaged in a public relations campaign to reassure consumers that product quality production issues had been addressed. Honeywell has invested in a training program to bolster the Chinese workforce's know-how. As of March 2018, the return rate on the US boot had been 2 percent, the boot made in China had a return rate of less than half a percent.

Honeywell sold Xtratuf to Rocky Brands in 2021.

== Products ==
In 2011, XTRATUF introduced a line of casual footwear in both men's and women's sizes: the Sharkbyte, a leather slip-on; the Chumrunner, a leather sneaker; and the Finatic, a classic-style leather boat shoe.

Beginning in 2016, XTRATUF has worked with the Salmon Sisters, an Alaska-based seafood and design company who provide artwork to XTRATUF's footwear.

After the devastating 2018 earthquake in Alaska, XTRATUF partnered with Bean's Cafe, an Anchorage soup kitchen and shelter, to make a limited edition t-shirt whose proceeds went towards relief efforts.
