= Jungle boot =

Jungle-warfare specialized boots

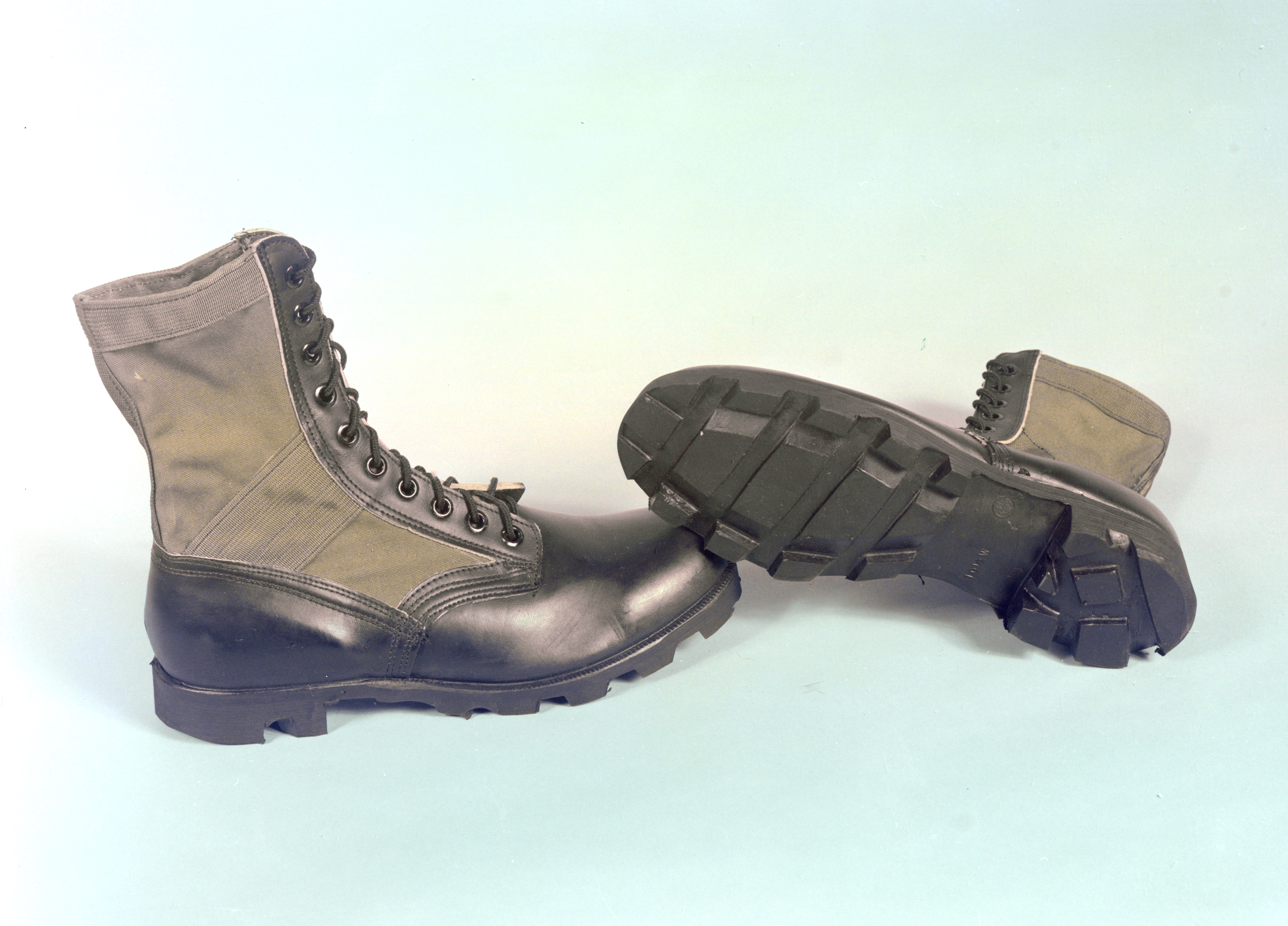
US jungle boots with Panama sole, pictured in 1981

Jungle boots are a type of combat boot designed for use in jungle warfare or in hot, wet, and humid environments where a standard leather combat boot would be uncomfortable or unsuitable to wear. Jungle boots have vent holes in the arches and sometimes a canvas upper to aid in ventilation and drainage of moisture.

== Development and use ==
The use of "jungle" or "hot weather" boots predates World War II, when small units of US soldiers in Panama were issued rubber-soled, canvas-upper boots for testing. Developed in conjunction with the U.S. Rubber Company, a pair of jungle boots weighed approximately three pounds (1.4 kg). Adopted in 1942, the design of the jungle boot was based on the idea that no boot could possibly keep out water and still provide sufficient ventilation to the feet in a jungle or swamp environment. Instead, the jungle boot was designed to permit water and perspiration to drain, drying the feet while preventing the entry of insects, mud, or sand.

In 1942, fused layers of original-specification Saran or PVDC were used to make woven mesh ventilating insoles for newly developed jungle boots made of rubber and canvas. The Saran ventilating insoles trapped air which was circulated throughout the interior of the boot during the act of walking; moist interior air was exchanged for outside air via the boot's water drain eyelets. In cold weather, the trapped air in Saran insoles kept feet from freezing by insulating them from the frozen ground; when walking, the insoles circulated moist air that would otherwise condense and freeze, causing trench foot or frostbite.

The new M-1942 canvas-and-rubber jungle boots with Saran mesh insoles were tested by experimental Army units in jungle exercises in Panama, Venezuela, and other countries, where they were found to increase the flow of dry outside air to the insole and base of the foot, reducing blisters and tropical ulcers. The Saran ventilating mesh insole was also used in the M-1945 tropical combat boot.

=== World War II ===
Positive reports from users in the Panama Experimental Platoon on the new lightweight footwear led to M-1942 jungle boots used by US military personnel in tropical/jungle environments, including US Army personnel in New Guinea and the Philippines, and in Burma with Merrill's Marauders, the 1st Air Commando Group, and the Mars Task Force (5332nd Brigade, Provisional). This style of footwear wore faster than the standard Army Type II field shoes, so they were often carried as a back-up footwear for use in soft mud.

In 1944, the Panama sole developed by Raymond Dobie used angled square-shaped lugs to push soft mud from the soles, providing better grip in greasy clay or mud. However, M-1942 (Jungle) and M-1945 (Combat Boot, Tropical) boots used Vibram soles. After the conclusion of World War II, American interest in jungle equipment lay dormant until their next tropical engagement in 1965, so did the concept of an improved jungle boot using Dobie's Panama sole.

Although taller, British military forces used a variant of the American jungle boot. Special Operations Executive Force 136 personnel were issued these boots during operations in Burma 1944–45. They were later used in the Malayan Emergency.

=== The First Indochina War ===
The French rubber/canvas jungle boots were manufactured by Palladium during the First Indochina War. Variants were available during the Algerian War. A high top version with buckles was used till the early 2000s. They are locally, in the French Army known as Pataugas, "splashers".

=== Vietnam War ===
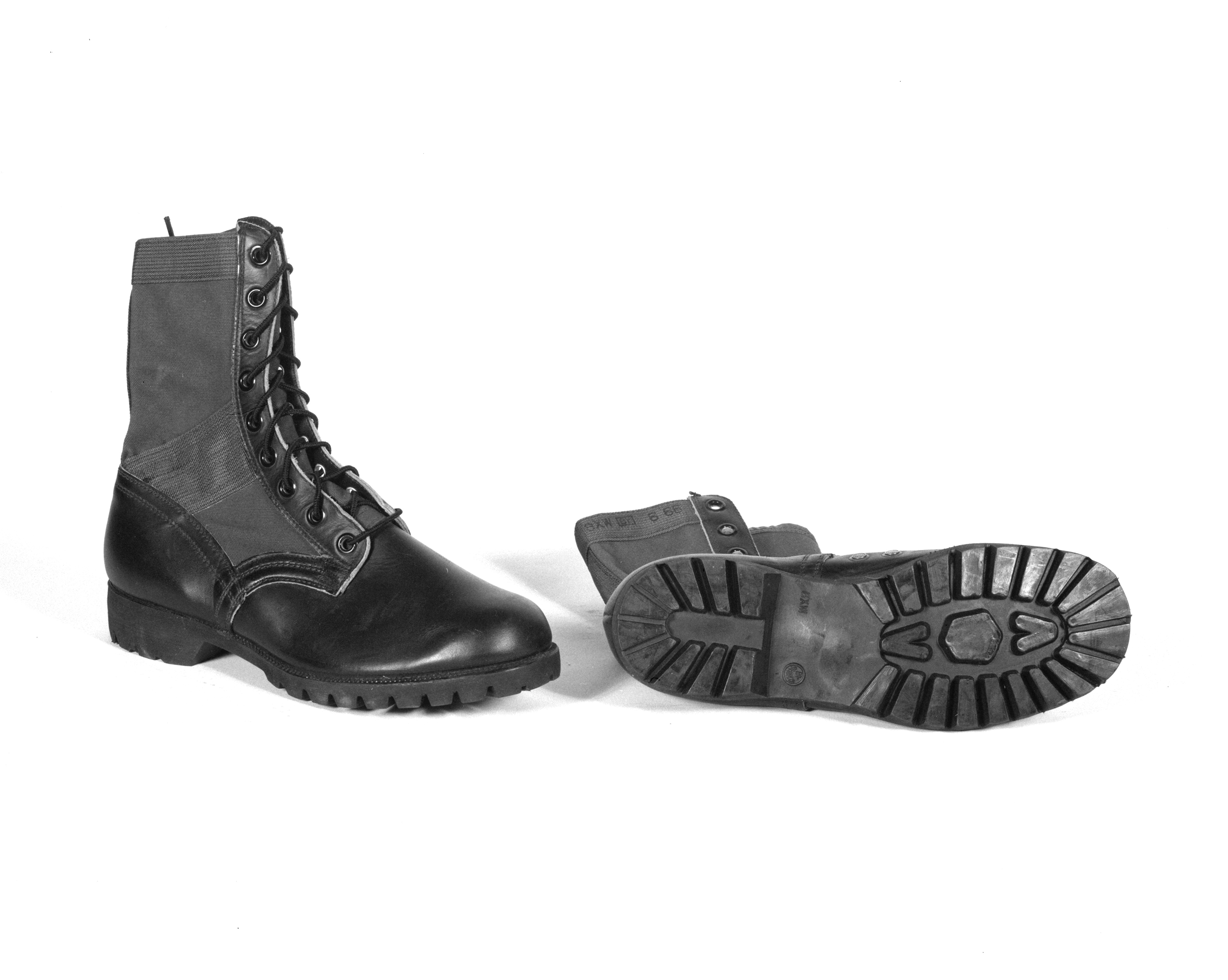
US jungle boots with Vibram sole

In the early years of the American involvement in the Vietnam War, some US Army soldiers were issued the 'M-1945 tropical combat boot'. In 1965, a newer version of the boot was made using materials developed after the end of the war, and it was adopted by the US military as the 'M-1966 jungle boot'. It was co-developed by Natick Laboratories and the shoe industry. In the newly developed improved footwear, the upper was cotton, leather comprised the toe and heel, with improved nylon reinforcements around the throat. That improved footwear used a Vibram-type lugged sole co-joined to the leather toe and heel. Water drains in the form of screened eyelets in the canvas top near the bottom were intended to drain moist mud from the inside of the boot using a hastily modified version of the Bernoulli principle. To use up old stock, the 1942 version of the removable ventilating insoles of fused layers of Saran plastic screen were issued with the improved jungle boot. US Army contracts went to shoe manufacturers such as Genesco, Bata (in Belcamp, Maryland), and Belleville Shoe Mfg. Co. to produce the M-1966 jungle boot.

To help prevent American foot injuries from punji stake traps, the 1966 jungle boots used a stainless steel plate inside the boot's sole to protect the wearer from enemy punji stake traps and nails. Later jungle boots used nylon/canvas uppers instead of cotton duck. The footwear received improvements, including Dobie's mud-clearing outsole and nylon webbing reinforcement on the uppers. Vibram-soled jungle boots continued to be issued to troops in 1969 until the introduction of jungle boots with the Panama sole tread.

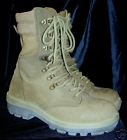
Australian replacement Terra combat boots

The US military jungle boot's popularity extended beyond Americans. During the Vietnam War, poorly equipped Australian Army and New Zealand Army soldiers traded for a pair of jungle boots from American troops to use alongside their standard-issue black leather general purpose boots (GP boots). After the 1st Battalion of the Royal Australian Regiment (1 RAR) co-joined the Americans in the Republic Of South Vietnam alongside the US Army's 173rd Airborne Brigade in 1965, many Australian troopers were willingly traded their worthless Army-issue "slouch hats" for a pair of jungle boots from the Americans since the boots Australian troopers were issued were World War II vintage tropical-studded ankle boots and their footwear were poorly suited to the conditions in the country. Special Air Service troopers of Australia and New Zealand used American jungle boots during their involvement against the North Vietnamese Army and the Viet Cong, and they were very popular with SAS troopers. Until the replacement of the GP boots for the Terra boots in 2000, Australians wore American footwear with their uniforms; the boots remained popular with Australian soldiers post-Vietnam.

=== Post-Vietnam jungle boot designs ===
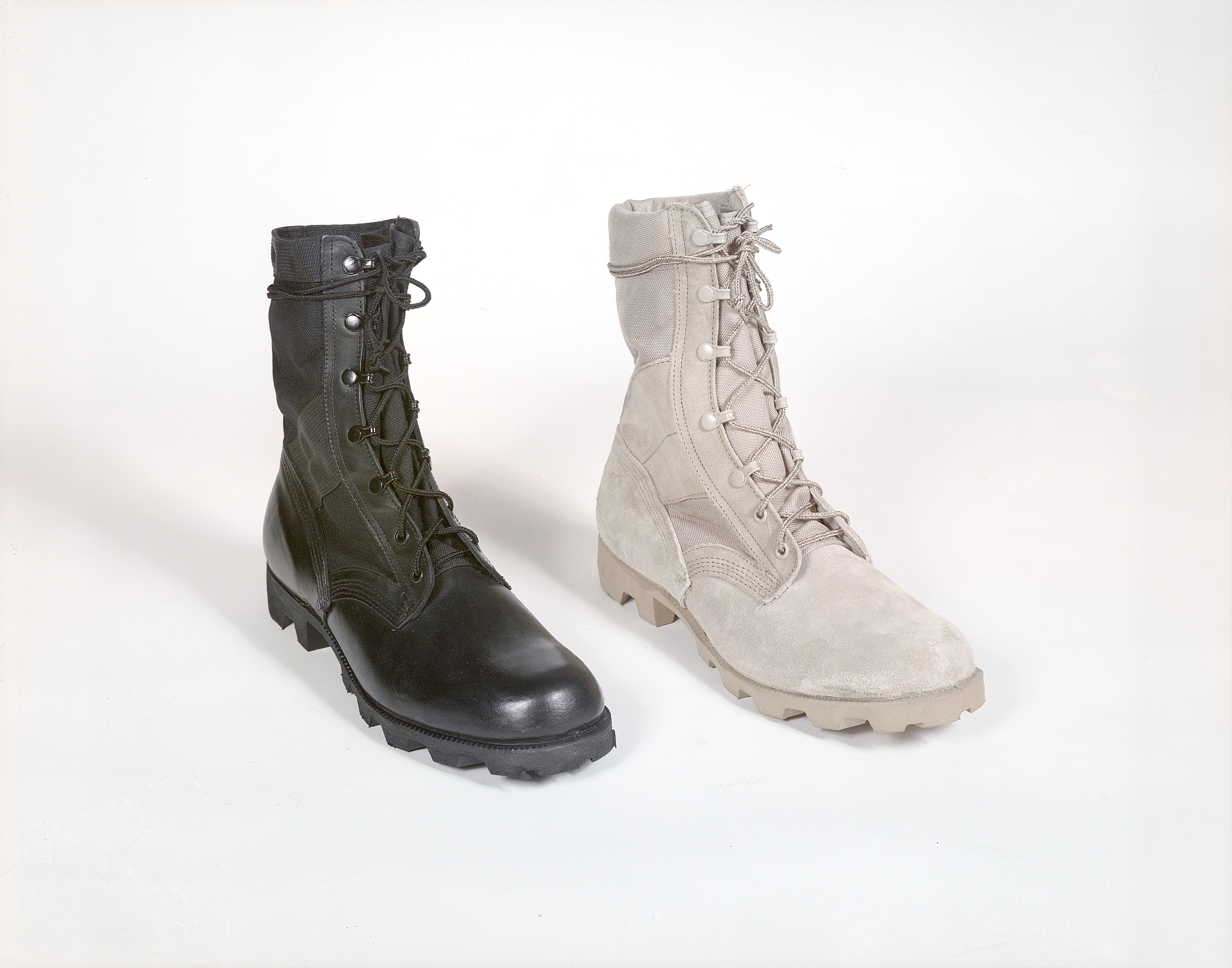
US black hot-weather boot and desert combat boot, 1991

The Vietnam-era jungle boots were quite successful. They went through minor improvements since 1962 and used in large numbers by troops in the Republic of Vietnam. Jungle boots were the standard combat footwear for mild weather for decades following Vietnam. The last nomenclature for jungle boots was 'Boot, Hot Weather, Type I, Black, Hot-Wet', and uses either OG107 green or black for the nylon sections of the upper. In addition, the 'Mod 2' boot is identical except with tan color for the leather and the nylon, eliminating the protective steel plate because of its reliability as a conductor of heat in hot sand and vent eyelets because they allow sand in. The US military jungle boot helped influence the design of the desert combat footwear of the Americans' next series of wars, Operation Desert Storm in 1991, Operation Enduring Freedom in Afghanistan in 2001, and Operation Iraqi Freedom in 2003. Despite the introduction of the desert boot by the time of Operation Desert Storm, supplies were limited and many troops still wore jungle boots and black leather combat boots during the conflict. Even during Operation Enduring Freedom over a decade later, many American troops used black jungle boots and black leather speed-lace combat footwear alongside the newer desert footwear in Afghanistan during the early 2000s.

During the 1980s, some improvements incorporated over the years in American footwear were modified or discarded for cost and convenience to the contractors. This included changes in rubber sole composition (reducing the janitorial load by reducing the tell-tale 'marking' on linoleum floors), and use of waterproof Poron linings instead of the left-overs from 1942 Saran ventilating in-soles. The improved version of the footwear retains their two-way water drain eyelets, so water is sucked into the boot, soaking the open-cell Poron in-soles in constant contact with the bottom of the foot. British forces use Saran insoles in their footwear because they like its insulating properties.

Increasing use of the jungle boot as a general-purpose combat boot wrought further improvements. To use up left-over stock, the issue boot's Dobie sole reverted to a Vibram sole in the 1980s. However, the Vibram sole, while suitable for rocks, sand, or other hard terrain, lacked the mud-clearing qualities of Dobie's sole, and was inferior in jungles or swamps. Other improvements were made to lower the costs to tax-payers. By the late 1980s, thousands of incidents of field destruction were reported by troopers, including heel blowouts and loss of water drains (screened eyelets) from poor materials/poor quality control.

Today, Altama Footwear and Wellco Footwear are two American manufacturers of American military jungle footwear. Altama began manufacturing boots for the military near the end of American involvement in Vietnam, in 1969, supplying the military with footwear. Wellco gained the first tax-payers contract for boots in 1965. These companies manufacture footwear with waterproof insoles and Vibram or Dobie outsoles with green cotton/nylon uppers and conventional eyelets, and manufacture an improved version with a black Cordura upper and a Speedlace-and-eyelet lacing system. Atalaia manufactures jungle footwear for the Brazilian Army. McRae boots of North Carolina produces the original green cotton boot and the black nylon boot in the US.

In the 2000s, the US Army and US Air Force removed the black jungle boot from frontline service, swapping them for suede desert-style boots after the Army adopted the Army Combat Uniform and the Air Force adopted the Airman Battle Uniform. Some foreign government agencies still issue US-made jungle boots to their forces. One example is in Afghanistan, with soldiers of the former Afghan National Army wearing black jungle boots with American-made combat uniforms.

In 2005, the Marine Corps retired the black jungle boots from front-line military service, and replaced them with two versions of a new tan rough-out leather combat boot. One version, called the Temperate or Infantry combat boot, has an inner waterproof Gore-Tex lining. The Temperate boot is an effort to keep moisture out of the boot because, after the interior is wet, moisture tends to remain there. The lining limits air exchange, limiting its use to environments with temperatures of 98 °F (37 °C) or less. Another version, the hot weather boot, eliminates the lining while retaining the vents.

== See also ==
- Desert combat boot
- List of boots
- List of shoe styles
- United States Army uniforms in World War II
