= Desert combat boot =

Type of military combat boot

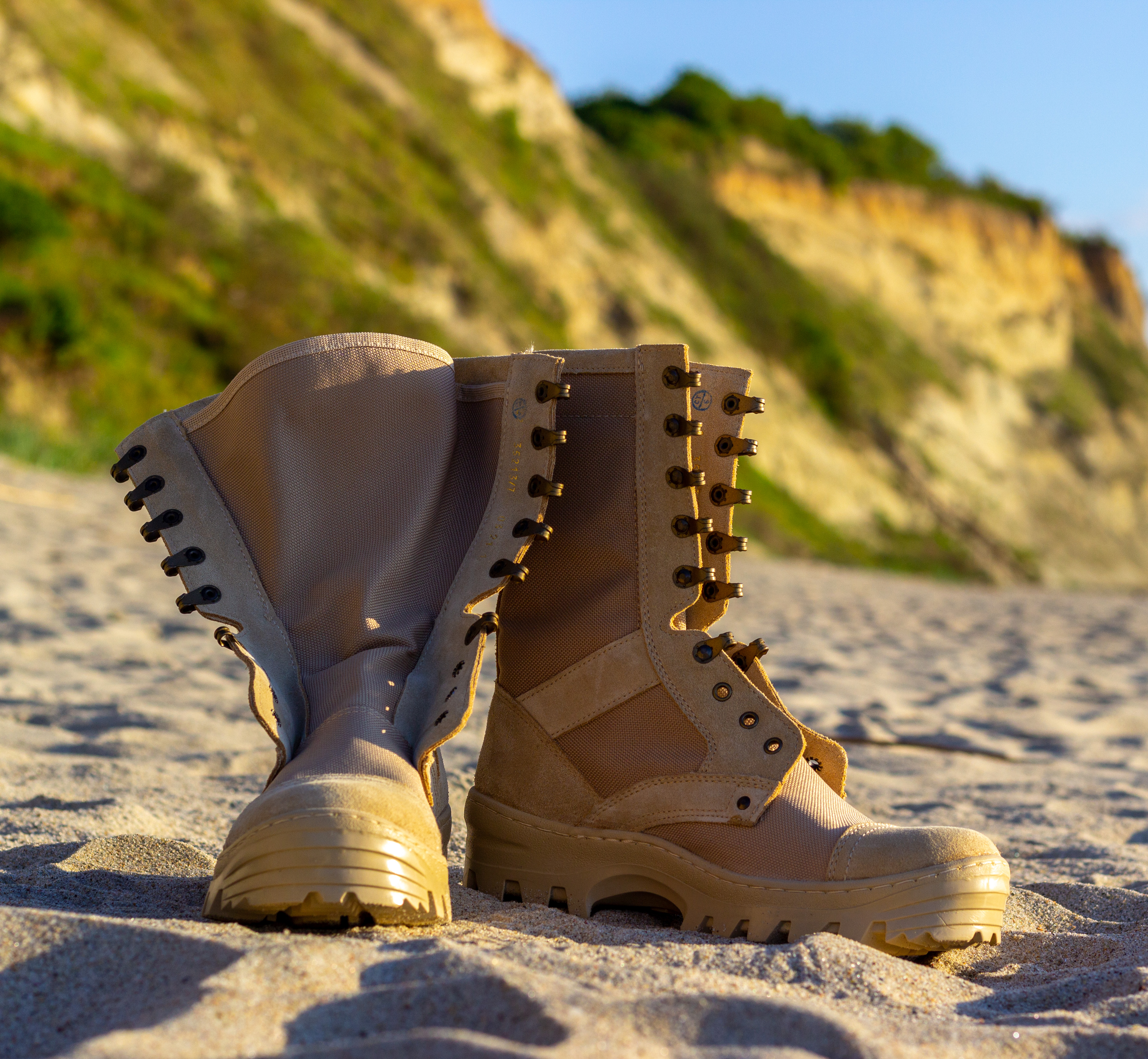
Beige desert boots in the sand

A desert combat boot is a type of combat boot designed specifically for use in humid or arid regions for desert warfare, where a traditional or standard issued black leather combat boot might be deemed uncomfortable or unnecessary. Like jungle boots, desert boots may implement similar designs; such as nylon canvas sides, speed lacing, and drainage vents on the instep. Boots made for desert warfare may commonly come in colors such as tan or beige, and range from dark to lighter versions of the two.

== History and use ==
While the history of the desert boot can trace its lineage back to the basic brown leather Chukka type boots worn by British and Australian commonwealth forces of North Africa in WWII, current modern incarnations of the boot did not come until the 1970s from nations like Saudi Arabia, who fielded the first traditional direct molded sole, camel-skin beige style boot for use by the Royal Saudi Land Force, with the "zig-zag" sole of the boots inspired directly by the American made black leather "McNamara boot".

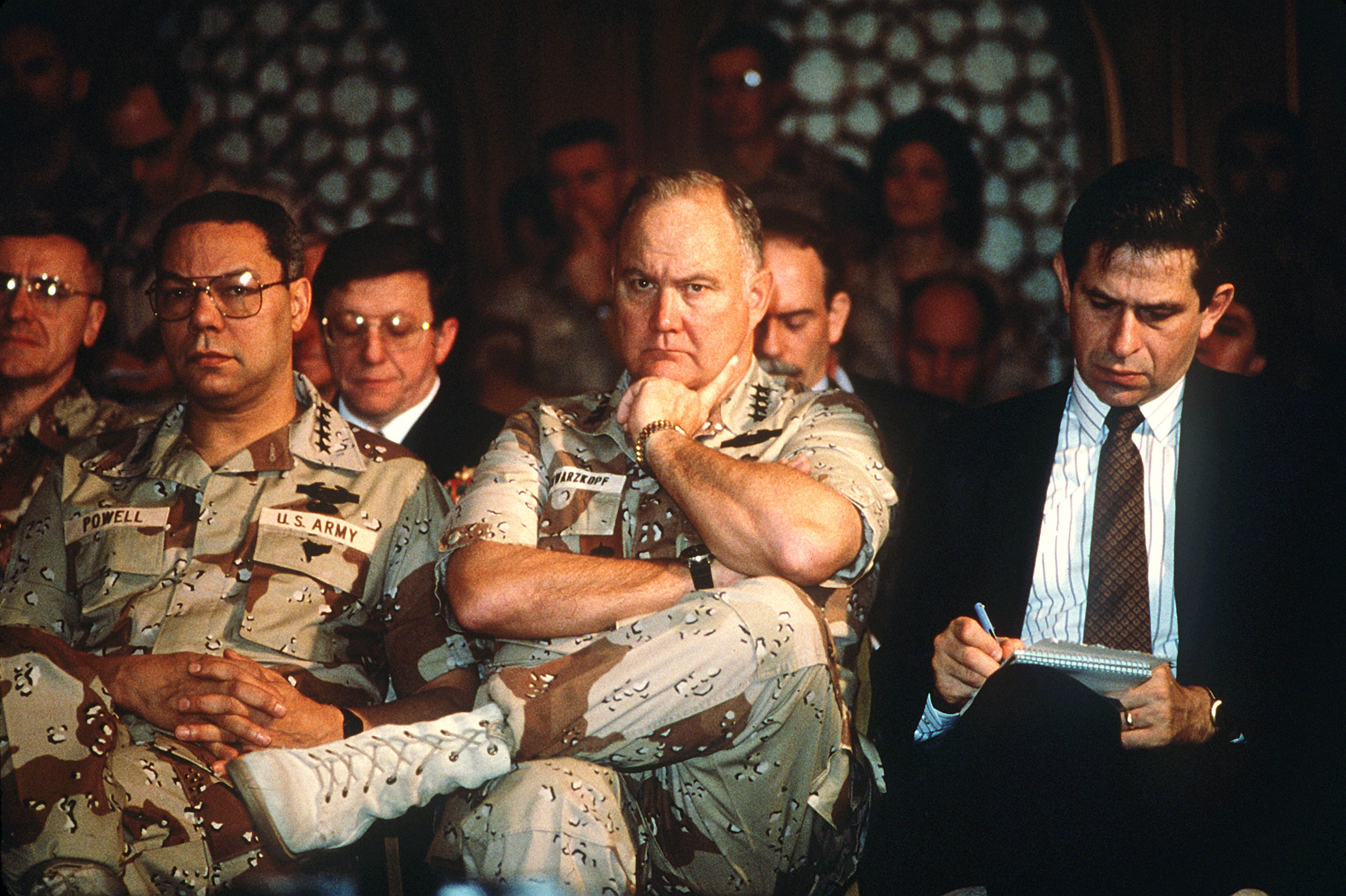
General Norman Schwarzkopf wearing desert boots during Operation Desert Storm, 1991

The development of the American desert boot dates back to 1989, in conjunction with the development of a new simple all-black leather and nylon jungle boot to replace the vast quantities of Vietnam War-era black and olive green boots that had been issued since 1967, many of which were reaching the end of their service life after over twenty years of use. Wellco Enterprises of North Carolina was awarded a contract by the U.S. Army Natick Laboratory to assist with a new desert boot concept, an initiative backed by Norman Schwarzkopf, the U.S. Commander of CENTCOM. At the time, Wellco was also producing the newer all-leather black combat boot ("Boots Combat, Mildew & Water resistant, Direct Molded Sole"). They shipped several rounds of prototype improved desert boots to Natick under the development contract.

The Gulf War required a large ground force to operate in desert conditions, an environment not encountered by U.S. troops since the North African Campaign in early World War II. The majority of the boots available at the start of the Gulf War were not suited for the harsher desert conditions of the Middle East. Schwarzkopf, being a very public figure, was noted as sporting a pair of Saudi-made desert boots and was seen wearing the American-made desert combat boot during the final phase of the war. The first American-made versions came into existence due in part to input and opinion by Schwarzkopf's experience wearing the Saudi boot.

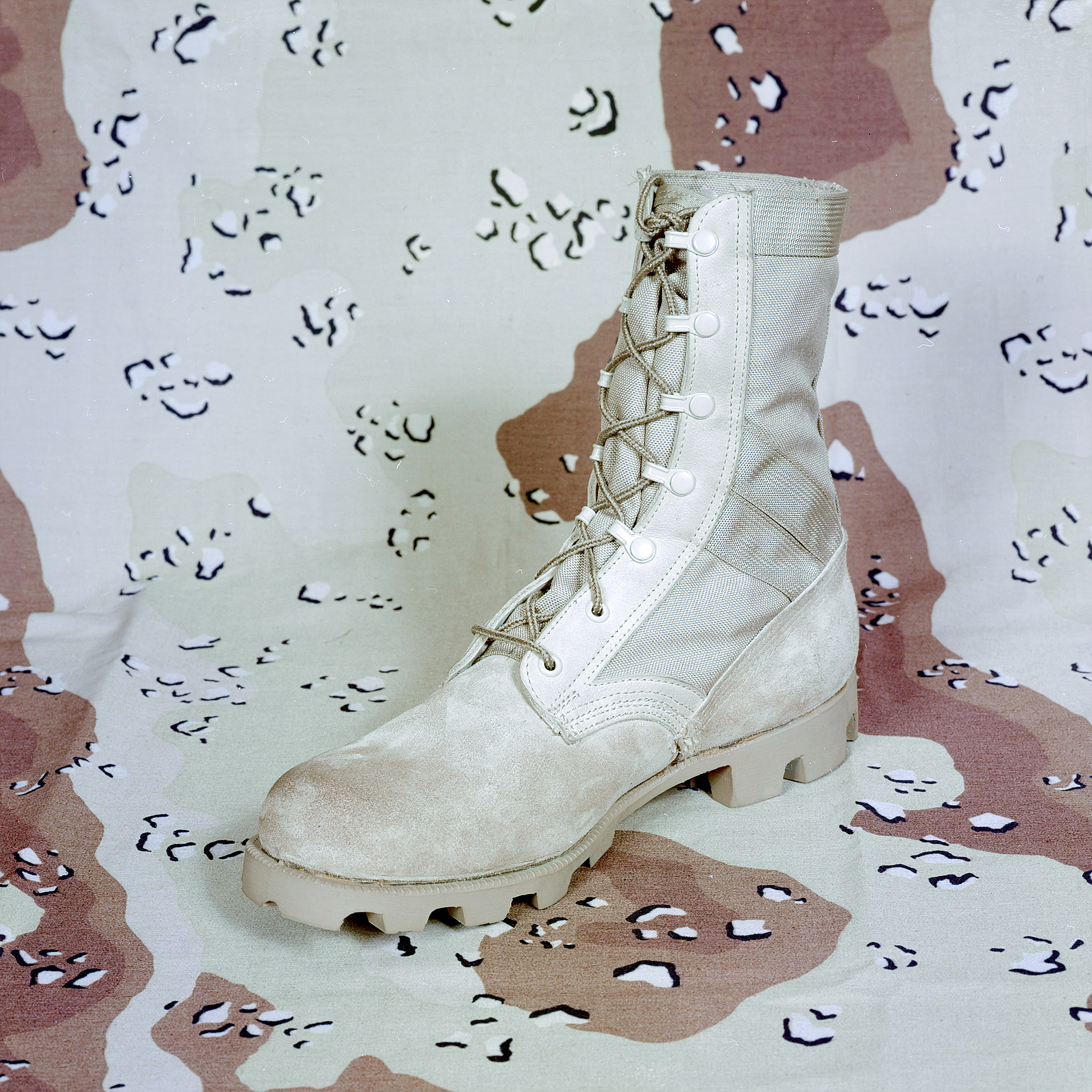
New desert combat boot in September 1990

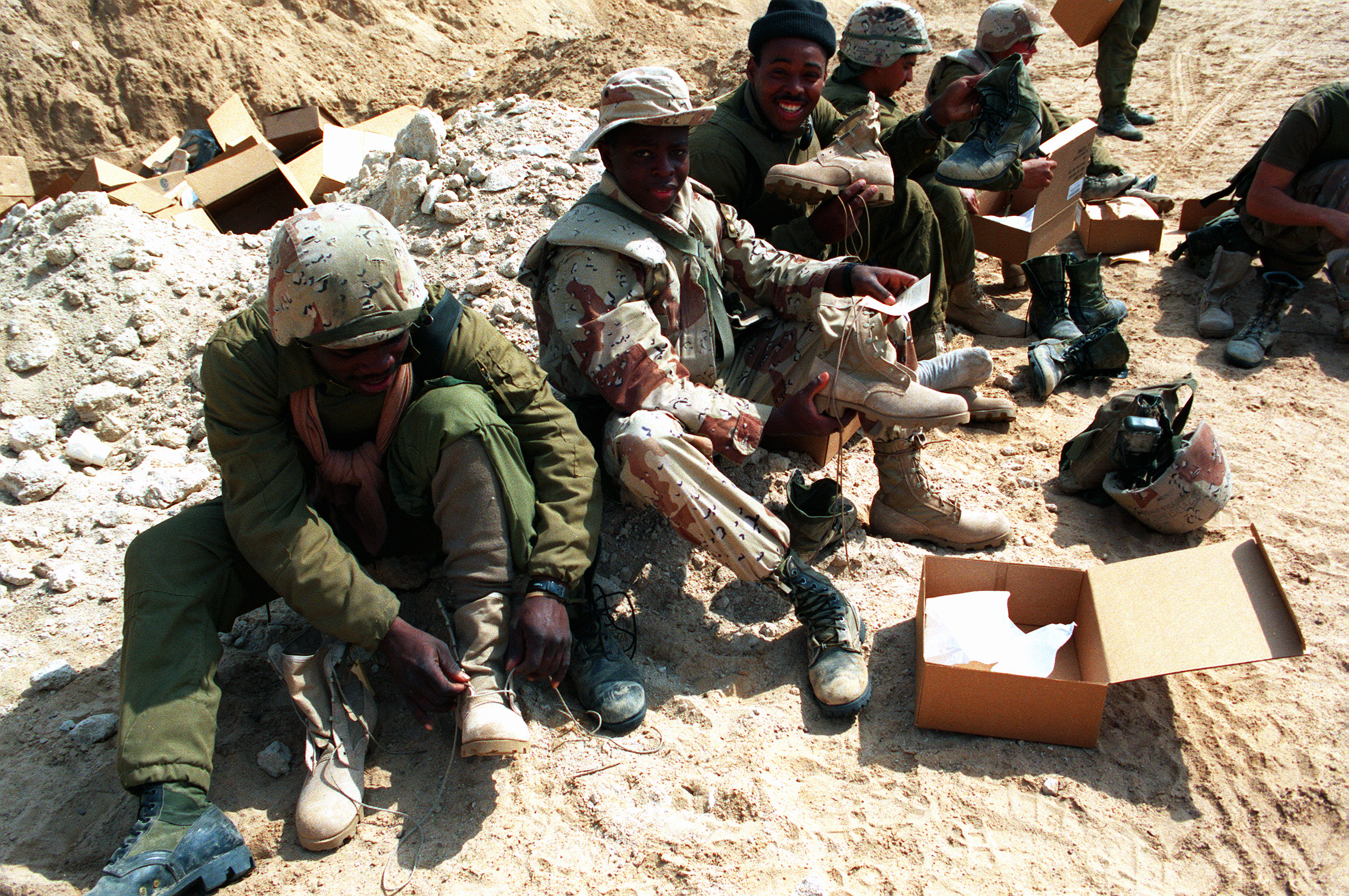
Members of C Co., 3rd Tank Battalion, 1st Marine Division, try on newly issued field boots during Operation Desert Storm on 19 February 1991

During trial and fielding, Schwarzkopf requested several features of the new American desert combat boot, including:

- A rough tan suede material with tan nylon siding and laces.
- 5-6 speed-lace eyelets for faster tying.
- Use of the distinct Vietnam War era Panama-sole tread pattern on the bottom of the boot.
- Elimination of the steel protection plate, which caused heat to be retained when the boot came into contact with hot sand.
- The elimination of the drainage vents at the instep to prevent sand from entering the boot.

At the same time, the high rate of mobilization called for continued orders of the standard jungle boot, as well as all versions of the black all-leather combat boots, with overlapping manufacturing of the older models and the development of the new boot. By November 1990, the rate of use in the Gulf was so high that an all-out acceleration of the Desert Boot was demanded from Wellco. By December a pair of prototype boots was finished and delivered personally to Schwarzkopf along with commitments to high-rate manufacturing in the coming months.

Initially, General Schwarzkopf was not happy with the prototype desert boots he received from Wellco or with the other commercial and prototypes reviewed. Development of the desert boot was briefly halted while waiting on a decision on how to proceed. The Wellco ND914 Desert Boot was chosen from nine contenders and, during October 1990 and early January 1991, procurement gears began to turn with the first 5,000 pairs delivered on January 15, 1991. Eventually all of General Schwarzkopf's concerns were met and the updated version was made by four manufactures. Wellco Enterprises, Altama Delta Corp (Georgia), Belleville Shoe (Illinois), and McRae Industries (North Carolina). To this day, several of these companies continue to manufacture the original issued "Boots Combat, Mildew & Water resistant, Direct Molded Sole", the leather and nylon "Boots, Hot Weather, Black" Jungle boot, and the original Desert Combat boots in the Panama sole style and other tread styles.

By 1993, the Army had adopted the desert boot in large quantity for operations in Somalia during UNOSOM II. And worn by the 75th Ranger Regiment in Operation Gothic Serpent, made heavy use of the Desert Combat boot.

== Later development, 2000s and today ==
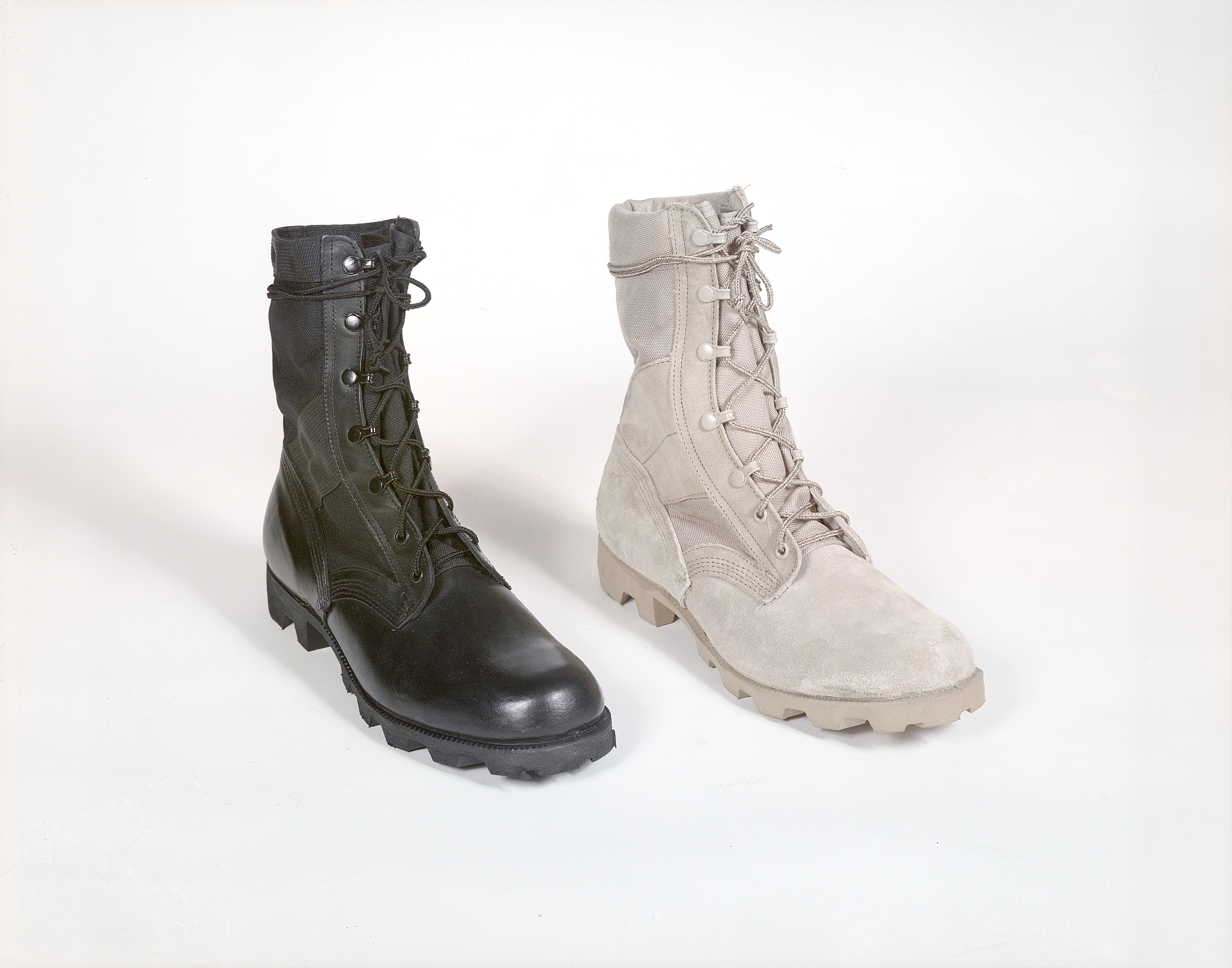
Hot weather boot and revamped desert combat boot in July 1991

After the Gulf War, the desert boot became a common staple among U.S. troops deployed to the Persian Gulf, when worn in conjunction with the Desert Battle Dress Uniform or Desert Camouflage Uniform, while the black leather combat boot was relegated to stateside deployment, overseas bases in Europe, and peacekeeping zones like Bosnia and Kosovo when wearing of the woodland Battle Dress Uniform was appropriate.

In 2001 and 2003, when American troops deployed to places like Afghanistan or Iraq, and in addition to constant deployment cycles, branches like the United States Marine Corps and the United States Army began experimenting with boots that would require less maintenance. The Corps became the first branch to completely abandon the traditional all-black combat boot, in favor of a simple tan, hot weather or temperate weather rough-out boots manufactured by Belleville Shoe Co instead. The Army later followed suit a few years later with the adoption of the Army Combat Uniform, which were accompanied by the tan Army Combat Boot. In 2015, with the eventual adoption of the new Operational Camouflage Pattern, the Army again changed its official boot color from tan to a darker shade, Coyote brown, while retaining the same style and appearance of the ACB.

== See also ==
- List of boots
- List of shoe styles
