= Neoprene =

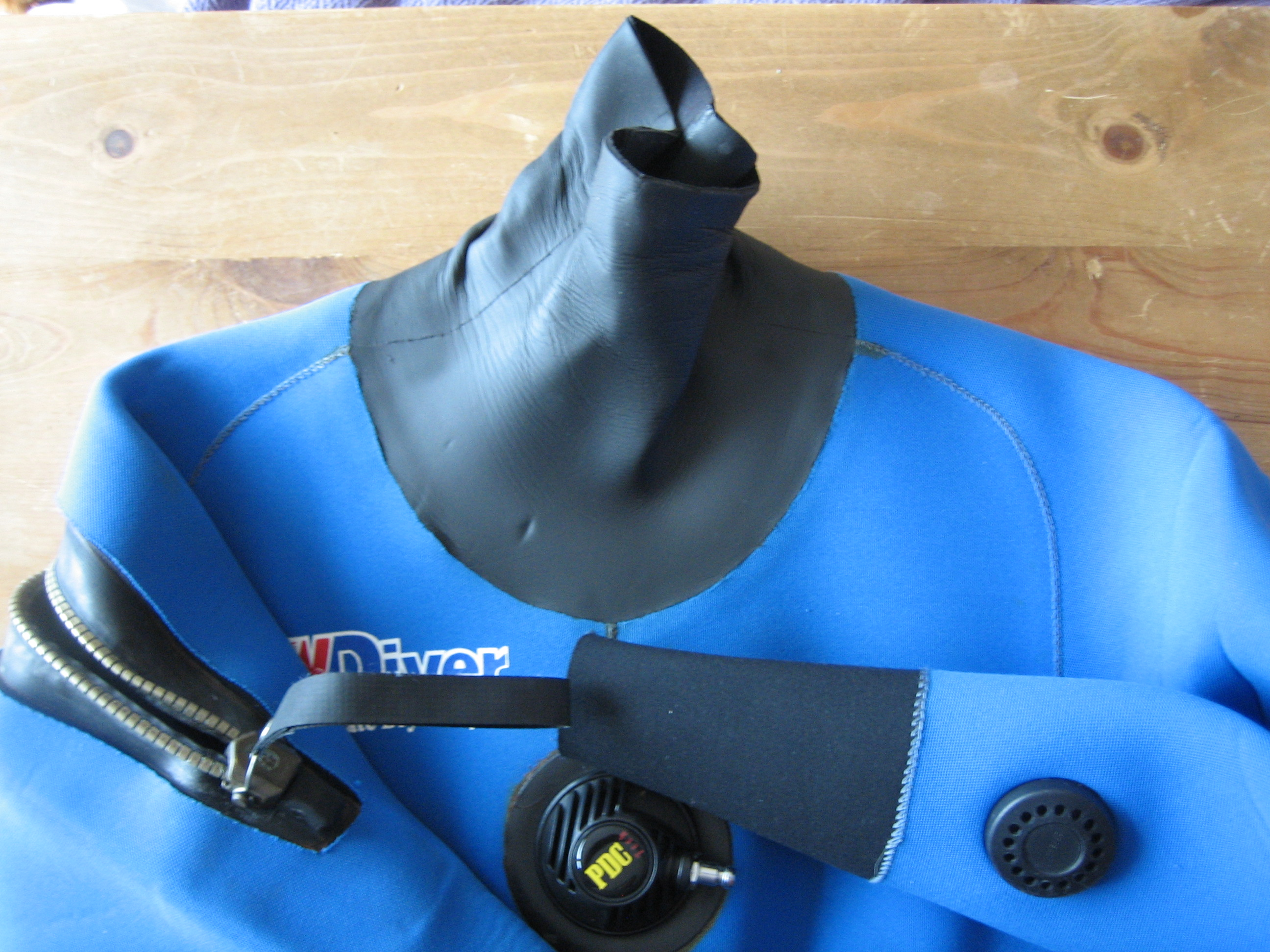
- A neck seal, wrist seal, manual vent, inflator, zip and fabric of a neoprene dry suit. The soft seal material at the neck and wrists is made from single backed closed-cell foam neoprene for elasticity. The slick unbacked side seals against the skin. The blue area is double-backed with knit nylon fabric laminated onto closed cell foamed neoprene for toughness. Some insulation is provided by the suit, and the rest by garments worn underneath.

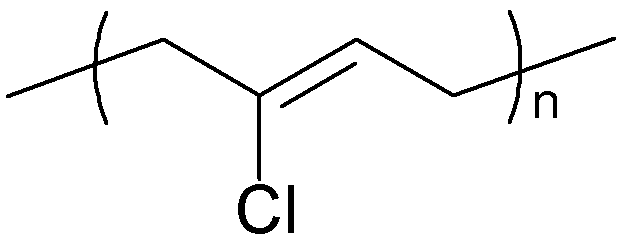
- Chemical structure of the repeating unit of polychloroprene

Identifiers
CAS Number	9010-98-4
ECHA InfoCard	100.127.980
EC Number	618-463-8
CompTox Dashboard (EPA)	DTXSID10904984

Properties
Density	1.23 g/cm^{3} (solid); 0.1-0.3 g/cm^{3} (foam)
- Except where otherwise noted, data are given for materials in their standard state (at 25 °C [77 °F], 100 kPa). Infobox references

Neoprene (also polychloroprene) is a family of synthetic rubbers that are produced by polymerization of chloroprene. Neoprene exhibits good chemical stability and maintains flexibility over a wide temperature range. Neoprene is sold either as solid rubber or in latex form and is used in a wide variety of commercial applications, such as laptop sleeves, orthopaedic braces (wrist, knee, etc.), electrical insulation, medical gloves, liquid and sheet-applied elastomeric membranes or flashings, and automotive fan belts.

== Production ==
Neoprene is produced by free-radical polymerization of chloroprene. In commercial production, this polymer is prepared by free radical emulsion polymerization. Polymerization is initiated using potassium persulfate. Bifunctional nucleophiles, metal oxides (e.g. zinc oxide), and thioureas are used to crosslink individual polymer strands.

== History ==
Neoprene was invented by DuPont scientists on April 17, 1930, after Elmer K. Bolton of DuPont attended a lecture by Fr Julius Arthur Nieuwland, a professor of chemistry at the University of Notre Dame. During his work on acetylene, Nieuwland produced divinyl acetylene, a jelly that firms into an elastic compound similar to rubber when passed over sulfur dichloride. After DuPont purchased the patent rights from the university, Wallace Carothers of DuPont took over commercial development of Nieuwland's discovery in collaboration with Nieuwland himself and DuPont chemists Arnold Collins, Ira Williams, and James Kirby. Collins focused on monovinyl acetylene and allowed it to react with hydrogen chloride gas, manufacturing chloroprene.

DuPont first marketed the compound in 1931 under the trade name DuPrene, but its commercial possibilities were limited by the original manufacturing process, which left the product with a foul odor. A new process was developed, which eliminated the odor-causing byproducts and halved production costs, and the company began selling the material to manufacturers of finished end-products. The demand for the material rose very rapidly: in 1932, approximately 8,000 pounds of neoprene were produced, in 1933 approximately 52,000 pounds were produced, and this amount doubled annually for the following five years.

For quality control, the trademark DuPrene was restricted to apply only to the material sold by DuPont. Since the company itself did not manufacture any DuPrene-containing end products, the trademark was dropped in 1937 and replaced with a generic name, neoprene, in an attempt "to signify that the material is an ingredient, not a finished consumer product". DuPont then worked extensively to generate demand for its product, implementing a marketing strategy that included publishing its own technical journal, which extensively publicized neoprene's uses as well as advertising other companies' neoprene-based products. By 1939, sales of neoprene were generating profits over $300,000 for the company (equivalent to $6,900,000 in 2025).

== Mechanical properties ==
The high tensile performance of neoprene is a result of its highly regular backbone structure, which causes neoprene to undergo strain crystallization under tensile loading. A two parameter (strain rate and temperature) hyperelastic model can accurately capture much of the mechanical response of neoprene.

Exposure to acetone and heat have been shown to degrade the tensile strength and ultimate elongation of neoprene, likely due to a loss of plasticizers as well as an increase in crosslinking during heat exposure. The response of neoprene to thermal aging depends not just on the highest temperature it is exposed to, but also on the exact temperature-time profile; this is a result of the competing factors of scission of the main polymer chain and oxidative cross-linking. Chain scission leads to degradation, embrittlement, and a loss of toughness. Oxidation reactions in the presence of heating leads to increased cross-linking, which in turn causes hardening. The interplay of both these factors determines the resulting effect on material mechanical properties; cross-linking is thought to dominate for neoprene.

As neoprene is used to make electric cable jackets in nuclear power plants, the effect of gamma radiation on the mechanical properties of neoprene has also been investigated. Chain scission, possibly triggered by free radicals from irradiated oxygen, deteriorates its mechanical properties. Likewise, the tensile strength, hardness, and ultimate elongation of neoprene can also be degraded upon exposure to microwave radiation, which is of interest in the devulcanization process Finally, ultraviolet radiation is seen to decrease the mechanical properties of neoprene, which is important for outdoors applications of neoprene.

Mechanical properties of Neoprene
Property	Value
Ultimate tensile strength	27.579 MPa (4000 psi)
Young's modulus	6.136 MPa (890 psi)
Ultimate elongation	600%
Hardness (Durometer)	30–95
Glass transition temperature	-43°C
Storage modulus (measured at 1 Hz)	7.83 MPa (1135.646 psi)
Loss modulus (measured at 1 Hz)	8.23 MPa (1193.661 psi)

== Applications ==
=== General ===
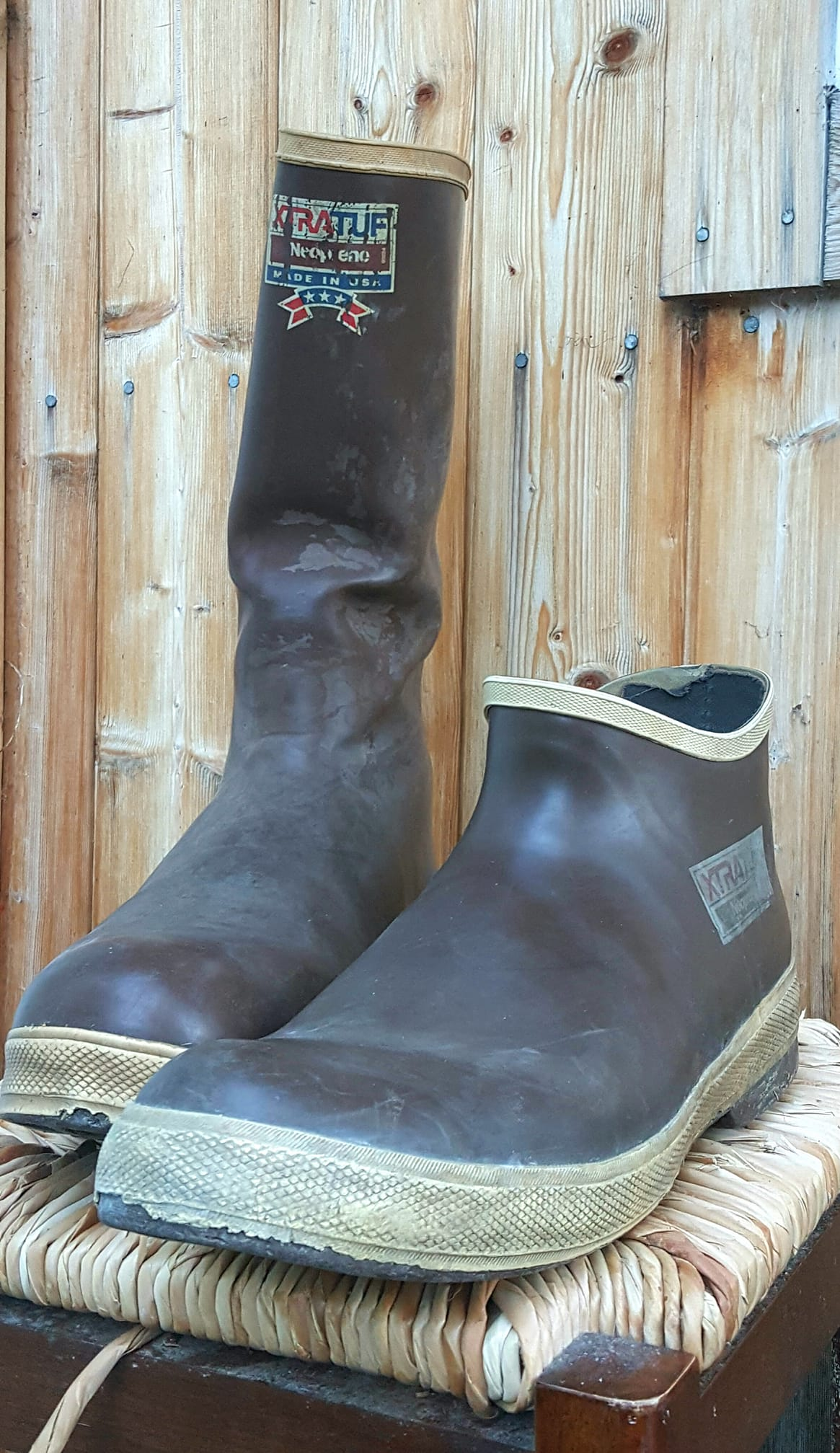
Two styles of well-worn Xtratuf boots made with neoprene

Neoprene resists degradation more than natural or synthetic rubber. This relative inertness makes neoprene well suited for demanding applications such as gaskets, hoses, and corrosion-resistant coatings. It can be used as a base for adhesives, noise isolation in power transformer installations, and as padding in external metal cases to protect the contents while allowing a snug fit. It resists burning better than exclusively hydrocarbon based rubbers, resulting in its appearance in weather stripping for fire doors and in combat related attire such as gloves and face masks. Because of its tolerance of extreme conditions, neoprene is used to line landfills. Neoprene's burn point is around 260 °C (500 °F).

In its native state, neoprene is a very pliable rubber-like material with insulating properties similar to rubber or other solid plastics.

Neoprene foam is used in many applications and is produced in either closed-cell or open-cell form. The closed-cell form is waterproof, less compressible and more expensive. The open-cell form can be breathable. It is manufactured by foaming the rubber with nitrogen gas, where the tiny enclosed and separated gas bubbles can also serve as insulation. Nitrogen gas is most commonly used for the foaming of neoprene foam due to its inertness, flame resistance, and large range of processing temperatures.

Polychloroprene is used in medical gloves and is often marketed for its superior elasticity, comfort and durability when compared to nitrile rubber, while still being safe for those allergic to natural latex.

=== Civil engineering ===
Neoprene is used as a component of elastomeric bridge bearings, to support heavy loads while permitting small horizontal movements.

=== Aquatics ===
Neoprene is a popular material in making protective clothing for aquatic activities. Foamed neoprene is commonly used to make fly fishing waders, wetsuits, and drysuits as thermal insulation. The foam is quite buoyant, and divers compensate for this by wearing weights. Foam neoprene compresses under pressure.

Some wetsuits are of the "super-flex" variety, which uses spandex in the knit liner fabric. A drysuit is similar to a wetsuit, but uses thicker and more durable neoprene to create an entirely waterproof suit that is suitable for wear in extremely cold water or polluted water.

=== Home accessories ===
Neoprene is used for lifestyle and other home accessories including laptop sleeves, tablet holders, remote controls, mouse pads, and cycling chamois.

=== Music ===
The Rhodes piano used hammer tips made of neoprene in its electric pianos, after changing from felt hammers around 1970.

Neoprene is also used for speaker cones and drum practice pads.

=== Hydroponic gardening ===
Hydroponic and aerated gardening systems make use of small neoprene inserts to hold plants in place while propagating cuttings or using net cups. Inserts are relatively small, ranging in size from 1.5 to 5 inches (4 to 13 cm). Neoprene is a good choice for supporting plants because of its flexibility and softness, allowing plants to be held securely in place without the chance of causing damage to the stem. Neoprene root covers also help block out light from entering the rooting chamber of hydroponic systems, allowing for better root growth and helping to deter the growth of algae.

=== Face mask ===
During the COVID-19 global pandemic, neoprene was identified by some health experts as an effective material to use for home made face masks. Some commercial face mask manufacturers that use neoprene have claimed 99.9% filtration for particles as small as 0.1 microns. The size of coronavirus is identified to be on average 0.125 microns.

=== Other ===
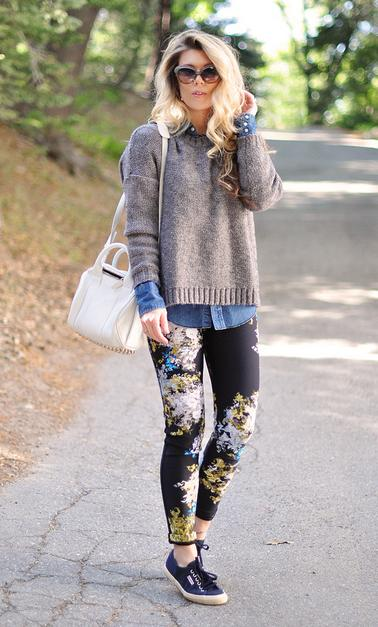
A woman wearing neoprene leggings

Neoprene is used for Halloween masks and masks used for face protection, to make waterproof automotive seat covers, in liquid and sheet-applied elastomeric roof membranes or flashings, and in a neoprene-spandex mixture for manufacture of wheelchair positioning harnesses.

In tabletop wargames, neoprene mats printed with grassy, sandy, icy, or other natural features have become popular gaming surfaces. They are durable, firm and stable, and attractive in appearance, and also favoured for their ability to roll up in storage but lie flat when unrolled.

Because of its chemical resistance and overall durability, neoprene is sometimes used in the manufacture of dishwashing gloves, especially as an alternative to latex.

In fashion, neoprene has been used by designers such as Gareth Pugh, Balenciaga, Rick Owens, Lanvin, and Vera Wang.

== Precautions ==
Some people are allergic to neoprene while others can get dermatitis from thiourea residues left from its production.

The most common accelerator in the vulcanization of polychloroprene is ethylene thiourea (ETU), which has been classified as a reproductive toxin. From 2010 to 2013, the European rubber industry had a research project titled SafeRubber to develop a safer alternative to the use of ETU.

== See also ==
- Isoprene
