= Tanker boot =

Military boots for soldiers on tanks

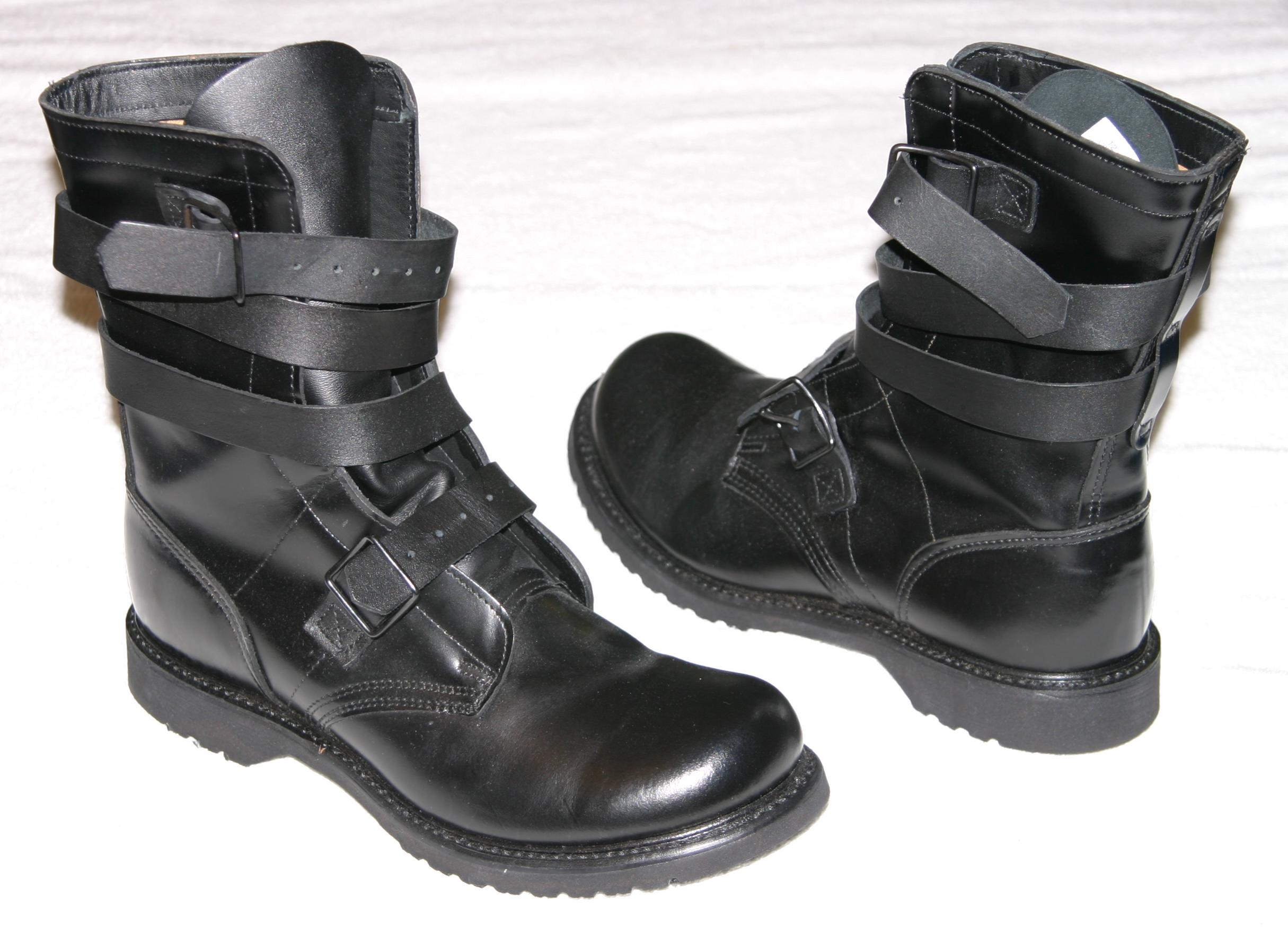
Tanker boots have a wrap-around strap closure.

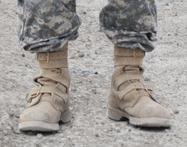
Tanker boots of an M1 Abrams crewman.

Tanker boots are military boots closely associated with soldiers who serve on tanks. The tanker boot was "designed by Dehner's own H. E. Ketzler and General George S. Patton Jr. in 1937" who "wanted something easy and fast to get on." Regular combat boots are laced through metal eyelets in the leather upper, but the tanker boots are fastened with leather straps which wrap around the upper and buckle near the top. This benefits the wearer in several ways:

- The leather straps are advantageous specifically to those working inside tanks. The problem with laces is that they can become undone easily and then entangled in the many exposed moving parts of a tank, and drag the wearer or part of his body into the machinery.
- Many boots have nylon or canvas panels in their uppers and also nylon laces which will melt if exposed to fire. Melting boots and laces will serve to further injure a crewman and make evacuating him out of the vehicle more difficult.
- Tracked crewmen typically find themselves performing maintenance on their vehicles in very muddy environments. The eyelets used in lacing become clogged with mud, so crewmen often just simply wrap the boot string around the upper portion of the boot without lacing through the eyelets at all. Another advantage of tanker boots is that they are much easier to loosen than a regular laced boot when caked in mud.
- Tanker boots allow for improved circulation to crew-members' feet, as they may be sitting or immobile for long periods of time. Armor crewmen during combat have reported remaining seated at their gunners', drivers', and commanders' stations for up to 48 hours during armored operations.

Tanker boots have a significant disadvantage over traditional lace-up combat boots in that they provide comparatively little ankle support; however, for troops that fight sitting in an armoured vehicle, this is relatively unimportant. An unauthorized variant of the tanker boot is the cavalry boot, or 'cav boot', which is higher above the ankle (in imitation of riding boots worn by the old horse cavalry) and might be worn by soldiers assigned to armored cavalry squadrons and scout units. The cavalry boots are more commonly seen being worn by officers in armored cavalry units.

== See also ==
- List of boots
- List of shoe styles
