= Redback Boots =

Australian footwear manufacturing company

Redback Boot Company
- Industry: Manufacturing
- Founded: 1989
- Headquarters: Alexandria, New South Wales, Australia
- Products: Combat boots, Safety boots and Workwear
- Owner: Ares Management (majority owner)
- Website: www.redbackboots.com.au

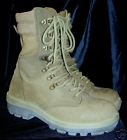
The Australian Terra Combat Boot.

Redback Boots is an Australian footwear manufacturing company. It was founded by the Cloros family in 1989. It specializes in lightweight work boots, and has been a supplier of the Australian Army, with its "Terra" boot at times being standard issue.

Since 2000, the Australian Defence Force, primarily uses the Redback Terra Combat Boot as a replacement for the Vietnam War-era General Purpose combat boots. It was given a limited number of tests in 1999, and was later distributed in 2000.

In December 2025, Ares Management acquired a majority stake in Redback Boots.
