= Army Combat Boot =

Combat boot of the United States Army

The Army Combat Boot is the primary issue combat boot of the United States Army since 2002, intended for use in conjunction with the Army Combat Uniform. In 2015, the Army changed the color for the combat boot from "desert tan" to the darker "coyote brown" color.

== Variants in USA Army ==
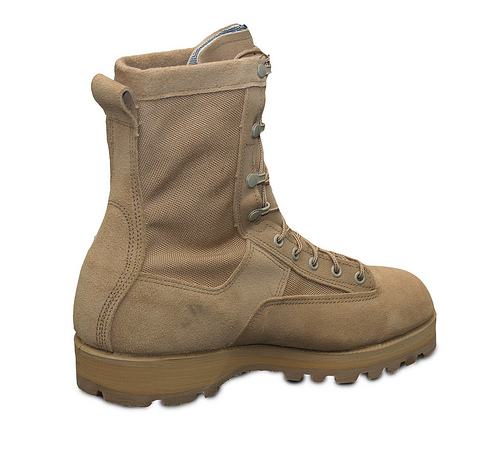
Temperate Weather

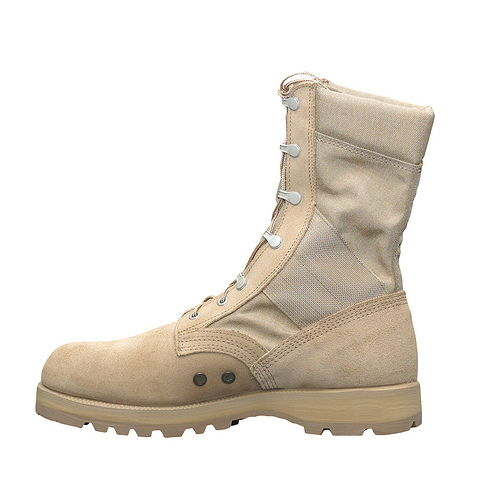
Hot Weather

There are two variants for different climates. Both variants are tan-colored, with a moisture-resistant, rough-side-out cattlehide leather and nylon duck cloth upper. The sole consists of a shock-absorbing direct attach poly-ether polyurethane midsole, with an abrasion-resistant, slip-resistant rubber outsole. It has a combination eyelet and speed-lace lacing system.

=== Temperate ===
The Army Combat Boot contains a waterproof breathable membrane and integrated safety features: limited flame resistance, thermal insulation, and liquid fuel penetration protection.

=== Hot ===
The Army Combat Boot (Hot Weather) (ACB (HW)) has two drainage eyelets on the inner arch.

== See also ==
- List of boots
- List of shoe styles
- Mountain Combat Boot
- Modular Boot System
