= Rocky Brands =

Apparel company

Rocky Brands, Inc.
- Type: Public
- Traded as: Nasdaq: RCKY; Russell 2000 Component
- Industry: Footwear, apparel
- Founded: 1932; 94 years ago
- Founder: William Brooks; F.M. "Mike" Brooks
- Headquarters: Nelsonville, Ohio, U.S.
- Area served: U.S., Canada, Europe
- Key people: Jason Brooks (Chairman & CEO)
- Products: Hunting boots; Apparel; Work boots; Work apparel; Western boots
- Revenue: ▲US$259.54 million (2008)
- Number of employees: 1,600 (2008)
- Website: rockybrands.com

Rocky Brands, Inc., formerly known as Rocky Shoes & Boots, Inc., is a company which designs, develops, manufactures, and markets outdoor, work, western and military footwear, and other outdoor and work apparel and accessories. The company was founded in 1932 in Nelsonville, Ohio, and still maintains its corporate headquarters there.

== History ==
In 1932, William Brooks, joined by his brother F. M. "Mike" Brooks, founded The William Brooks Shoe Company in Nelsonville, Ohio. Both men had lost their jobs during the Great Depression when Godman Shoe Co. of Columbus went bankrupt. In search of opportunity, the brothers set up shop in a rent-free factory with lent equipment and what would eventually become Rocky Brands was born.

The company originally employed 50 to 100 workers with a production rate of 300 pairs of shoes per day. With a newly constructed addition and the installation of more equipment, by the mid-1930s the factory employed 225 people and production output increased to more than 2,000 pairs per day. During the 1940s and 1950s business continued to grow. While supplying more than one million pairs of shoes and boots for military conflicts such as World War II and the Korean War, the company built key relationships with leading footwear retailers.

But in 1958, William Brooks decided to sell the business to the Irving Drew Shoe Company of Lancaster, Ohio. His nephew, John Brooks, who had worked in the plant full-time since age 17, attempted to make a play for the family-run business, but his efforts were rebuffed. William Brooks refused to sell, telling his nephew the shoe industry had no future.

In 1975, the new owners were getting ready to sell or shut down the business. John Brooks, who stayed through the Irving Drew years as plant manager, bought the business back for $640,000, re-establishing The William Brooks Shoe Company in Nelsonville. John Brooks then brought his son, Mike Brooks, into the business as a product designer and manager. In 1977, Mike Brooks won an award for what now is called the original "Rocky boot," and the company paid $1,000 for a trademark and launched the Rocky brand.

As the company struggled in the early 1980s, the shoe market bounced back, and in 1983, the company began marketing occupational shoes, such as those worn by police officers and mail carriers, under the Rocky brand. It opened up new markets and new distribution methods. Sales rose and in 1988, the company reached $20 million in annual revenue.

Two years after the retirement of John Brooks in 1991, his son, Mike Brooks took the company public, spending nearly three-quarters of a million dollars in the process, changing the name to Rocky Shoes & Boots and initiating the company's initial public offering.

Rocky Shoes & Boots acquired EJ Footwear on December 6, 2004, for $87.7 million in cash and roughly $10 million in stock. The move brought Georgia Boot, Durango, and Lehigh Safety Shoes brands into Rocky's fold and added a licensed footwear brand in Dickies.

In 2006, Rocky Shoes & Boots changed its name to Rocky Brands, Inc. Following the name change Rocky Brands acquired comfort footwear Zumfoot shoes and Michelin footwear.

In February 2014 the company acquired Los Angeles based Creative Recreation for $11 million. In 2015, Creative Recreation's original owner Rich Cofinco was made creative director.

In 2021, Rocky Brands acquired Honeywell's performance and lifestyle footwear business for $230 million, including The Original Muck Boot Company, the neoprene boot brand Xtratuf, as well as the Servus, NEOS and Ranger footwear brands.

== Philanthropy ==
In 2009, Rocky Brands formed the not-for-profit philanthropic organization Rocky Community Improvement Fund (RCIF), which maintains an endowment and awards grants.

== Awards ==
Rocky was awarded Footwear Plus magazine's Plus Award in the work footwear category for 2010.
