= Modular Boot System =

Combat boot system of the US Army

The Modular Boot System (MBS) is a multifunctional, multi-theater footwear system that affords the soldier environmental protection and added capability in environmental conditions ranging from −20–110 °F (−29–43 °C). As of 2011, it was a developmental program designed to replace the Army Combat Boot hot and temperate weather variants, ICWB w/RL and black Cold Weather Boot, which had already been phased out.

== See also ==
- List of boots
- List of shoe styles

== Sources ==
- This article incorporates work from , which is in the public domain as it is a work of the United States Military.
