= Bad Wörishofen =

Spa town in Bavaria, Germany

- Town
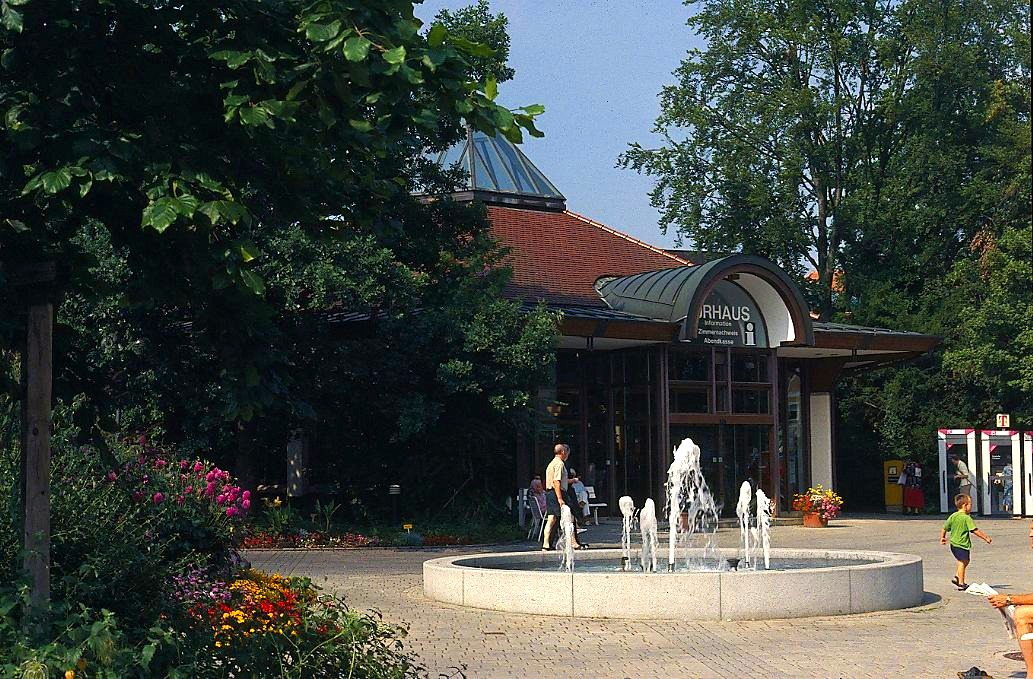
- Kurhaus of Bad Wörishofen

- Coat of arms

- Location of Bad Wörishofen within Unterallgäu district
- Interactive map of Bad Wörishofen
- Location within Germany Location within Bavaria
- Coordinates: 48°00′21″N 10°35′49″E
- Country: Germany
- State: Bavaria
- Admin. region: Schwaben
- District: Unterallgäu
- Subdivisions: 12 Gemeindeteile

Government
  - Mayor (2020–26): Stefan Welzel (CSU)

Area
  - Total: 57.79 km^{2} (22.31 sq mi)
- Elevation: 603–670 m (1,978–2,198 ft)

Population (2025-12-31)
  - Total: 16,893
  - Density: 292.3/km^{2} (757.1/sq mi)
- Time zone: UTC+01:00 (CET)
  - Summer (DST): UTC+02:00 (CEST)
- Postal codes: 86825
- Dialling codes: 08247
- Vehicle registration: MN
- Website: www.bad-woerishofen.de

Bad Wörishofen (German pronunciation: [baːt ˌvøːʁɪsˈhoːfn̩]) is a spa town in the district of Unterallgäu in Bavaria, Germany, known for the water-cure (hydrotherapy) developed by Sebastian Kneipp (1821–1897), a Catholic priest who lived there for 42 years. Many of the resort hotels and boarding-houses in Bad Wörishofen offer their guests treatment using Kneipp's methods.

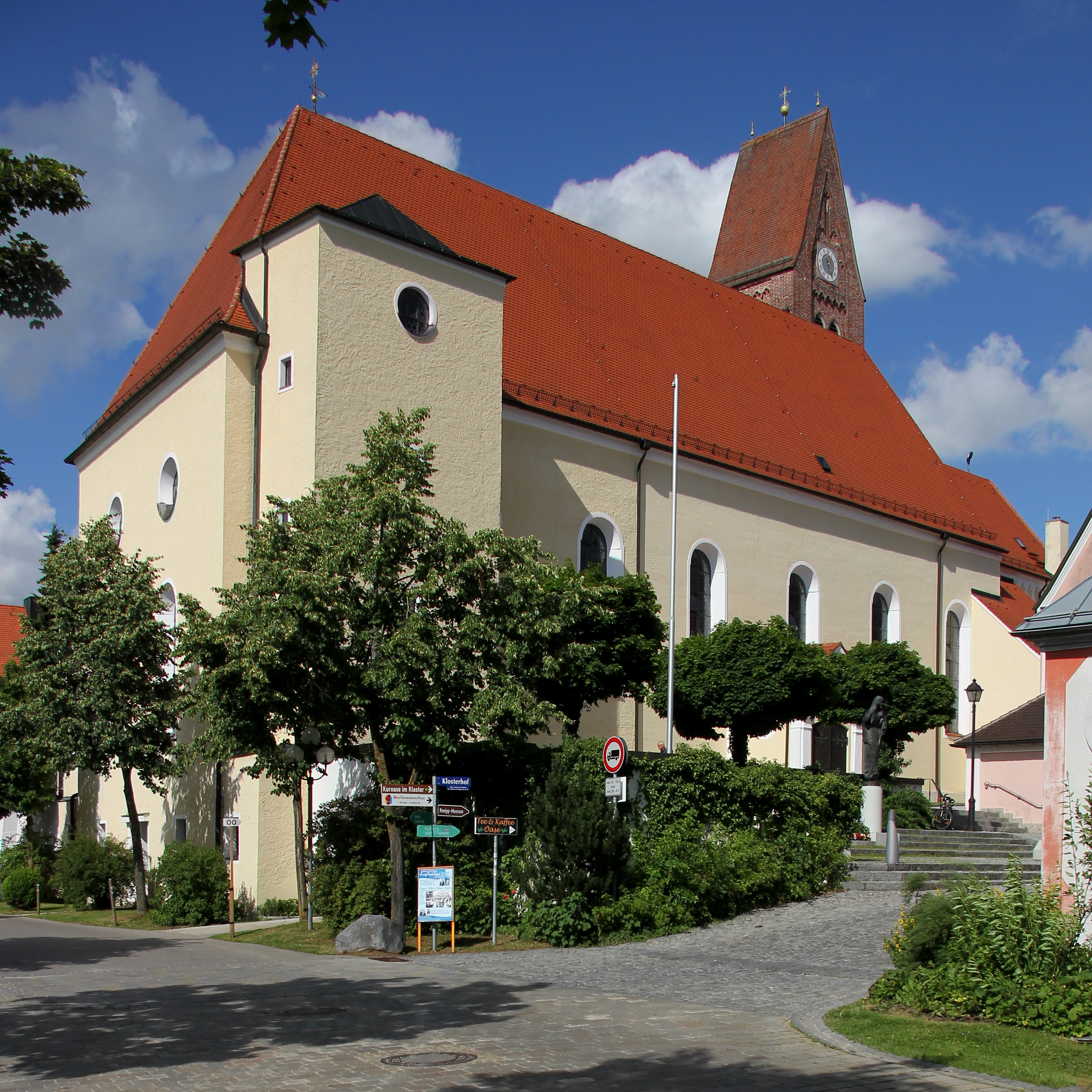
St. Justina Church at Bad Wörishofen

The new spa complex out of town is called Therme Bad Wörishofen. Time magazine called the town "the secret capital of health".

== Geography ==
The town is located on the Wörthbach, a tributary of the River Mindel in Donau-Iller, which is a border region straddling Bavaria and Baden-Württemberg. It is approximately 80 km / 50 miles west of Munich and 35 km / 22 miles east of Memmingen.

== History ==
The first known reference to the place dates from 1067, where it is described as the lordship "Werenshova". The name is thought to mean "Homestead of Werin". For centuries Wörishofen was an agricultural settlement. Between 1719 and 1721 the Dominican Wörishofen Monastery was built under the direction of Dominikus Zimmermann.

After World War II, with south-western Germany belonging to the American occupation zone, Bad Wörishofen was the site of a displaced persons camp. Most of the displaced people in question were of Lithuanian provenance. The camp enjoyed the confidence and support of the UNRRA, and was accordingly permitted to print its own bank notes.

== Personalities ==
=== Sons and daughters of the town ===
- Rainer Werner Fassbinder (1945–1982), film director
- Jeremias Schröder (born in 1964 as Maximilian Schröder), Benedictine Abbot and President of the Benedictine Congregation of St. Ottilien.
- Yank Azman (born 1947), Canadian actor

=== Personalities associated with Bad Wörishofen ===
- Hermann Aust (1853–1944), a keen supporter of Sebastian Kneipp and supporter of the development of Bad Wörishofen as a spa town.
- Viktor Frankl (1905–1997), founder of logotherapy, worked in Bad Wörishofen in 1945 where he was a doctor at the Hospital for Displaced Persons.

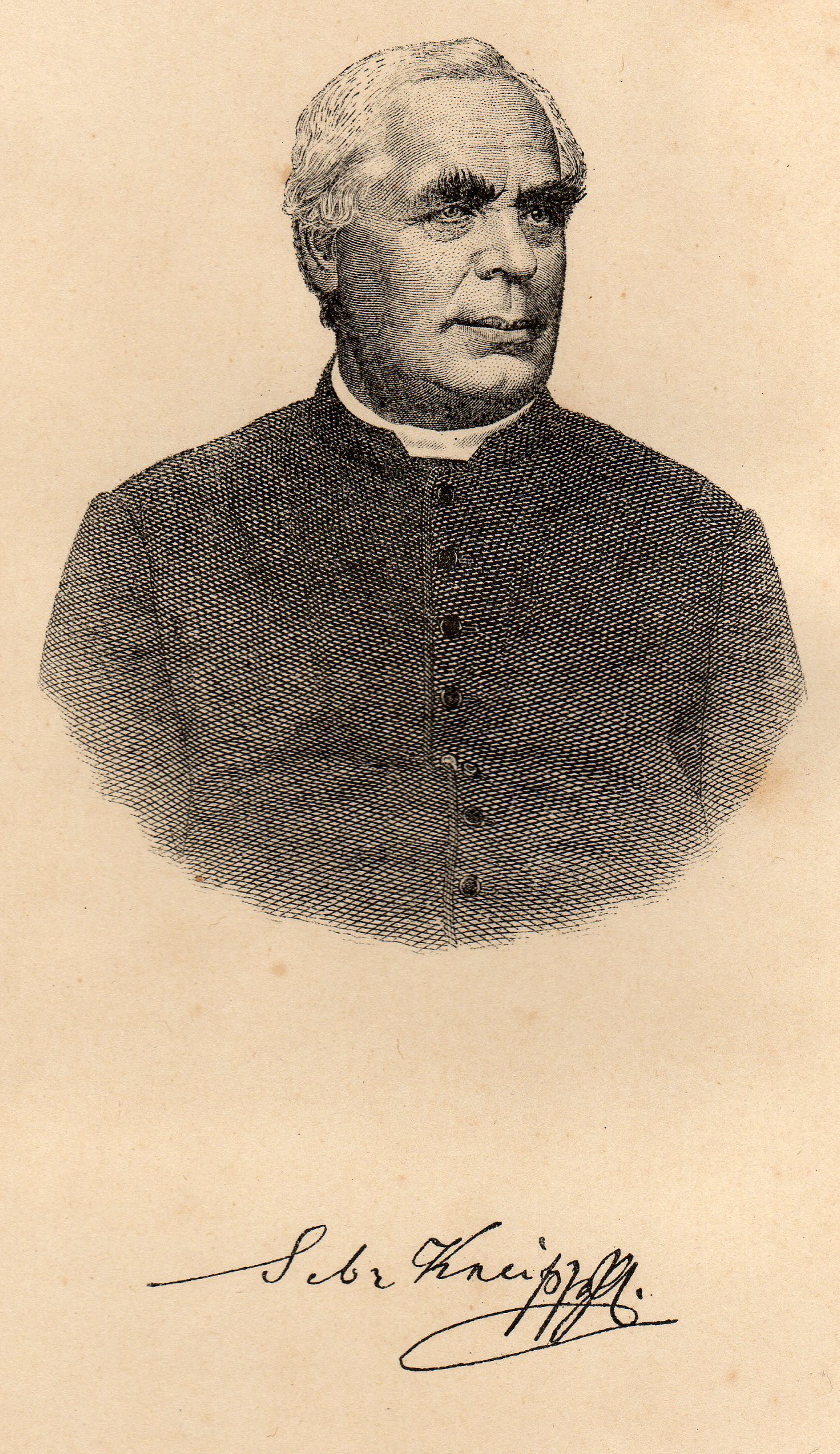
Sebastian Kneipp 1915

- Sebastian Kneipp (1821–1897), pastor and Hydrotherapeut, inventor of Kneipp health treatment using water.
- Carl Beines (1869–1950), violinist, composer, choral director and vocal pedagogue, whose pupils included Richard Tauber, and Herbert Ernst Groh, lived, taught and died in the town.
- Katherine Mansfield (1888–1923), New Zealand-born writer, wrote the short stories of In a German Pension after a stay at Bad Wörishofen in 1909.
- Franz "Bulle" Roth (born 1946), football player for the Germany national football team and FC Bayern Munich, owner of a shop for sportswear in Bad Wörishofen
- Ulla Salzgeber (born 1958), dressage rider, lived in Bad Wörishofen until 2011.
- Irmgard Seefried (1919–1988), soprano, lived in Bad Wörishofen from 1923 to 1940, winner of Bad Wörishofen's Public Service Medal in gold.
- Ethel Smyth (1858–1944), an English composer, lived in Munich for a while and had a health-related stay in Bad Wörishofen in 1889.
- Antanas Deksnys (1906–1999), a Catholic bishop from Lithuania.

== Economy ==
Wörishofer sandals are made here.
