= Mary Jane shoes =

Closed, low-cut shoe with one or more straps

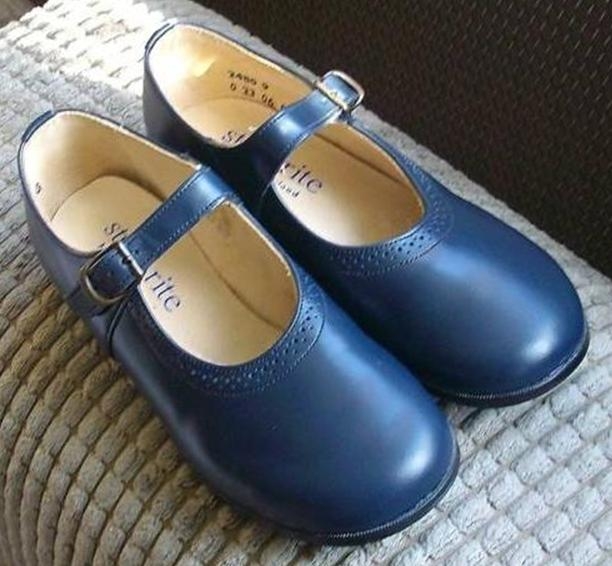
Classic Mary Jane shoes by Start-rite (known as Sonnet in the United States)

Mary Jane shoes (also known as bar shoes, strap shoes or doll shoes) are a style of closed, low-cut shoe with one or more straps across the instep (the arched part of the top of the foot between the toes and the ankle) when worn.

Classic Mary Janes for children are typically made of black leather or patent leather and have one thin strap fastened with a buckle or button, a broad and rounded toe box, low heels, and thin outsoles.

== History ==
Children's shoes secured by a strap over the instep and fastened with a buckle or button appeared in the early 20th century. Originally worn by both sexes, they began to be perceived as being mostly for girls during the 1930s in North America and the 1940s in Europe. They were also popular with women in the 1920s.

== Etymology ==
Mary Jane was a character created by Richard Felton Outcault, "Father of the Sunday Comic Strip", for his comic strip Buster Brown, which was first published in 1902. She was the sweetheart of the title character Buster Brown and was drawn from real life, as Outcault had a daughter of the same name. In Outcault's and his daughter's words, she was the only character drawn from life in the Buster Brown strip although "Mrs. Brown" resembled Outcault's wife.

In 1904, Outcault traveled to the St. Louis World's Fair and sold licenses to up to 200 companies to use the Buster Brown characters to advertise their products. Among them was the Brown Shoe Company, which later hired actors to tour the country, performing as the Buster Brown characters in theaters and stores. This strategy helped the Brown Shoe Company become the most prominently associated brand with the Buster Brown characters. The style of shoe both Buster Brown and Mary Jane wore came to be known by her name, Mary Jane.

== Adult styles ==
While the classic Mary Jane still retains its wide popularity and appeal, platform style Mary Janes have also evolved since the late 1990s, with 1-cm to 3-cm (½-in to 1-in) outsoles and 8-cm to 13-cm (3-in to 5-in) "chunky" heels, often with exaggerated grommets or buckles. The 1920s-style Mary Janes were a famous part of flappers' ensembles, thus reinforcing the childlike style the flappers had. These styles were especially popular in the United States in the late 1990s and early 2000s, within punk rock, psychobilly and goth subcultures. Many times the wearers would accent the look with knee-high knit socks in dark-colored stripes or patterns and/or some form of hosiery (stockings/pantyhose), and often complete the look with a plaid, pleated schoolgirl-style skirt.

Mary Janes are a popular part of kinderwhore and Lolita fashion. A pump with a strap across the instep may be referred to as a "Mary Jane pump", although it does not have the low heels or wide toe of the original Mary Jane (and a pump is generally strapless by definition).

== Gallery ==
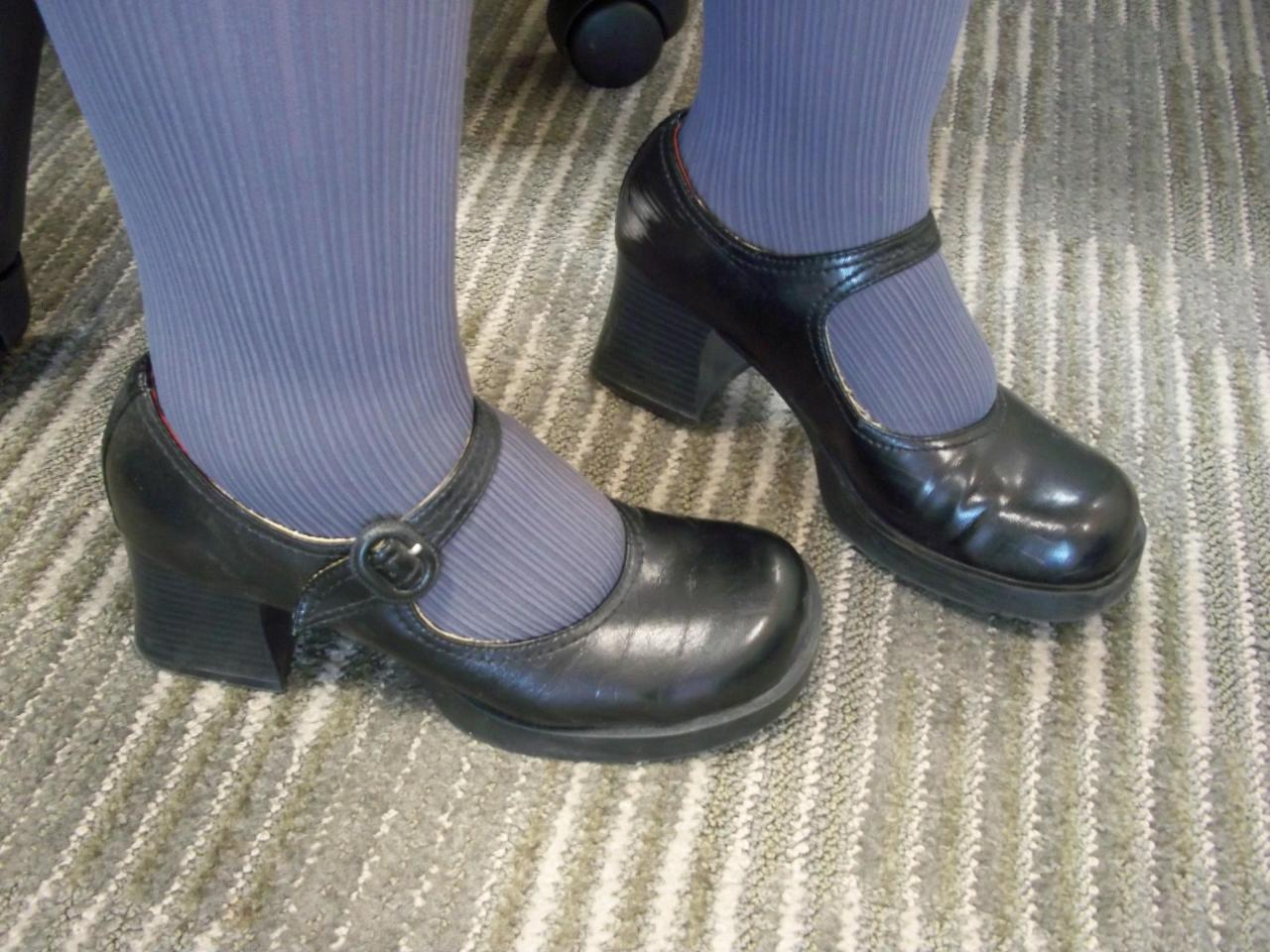
Modern chunky-heeled Mary Jane shoes

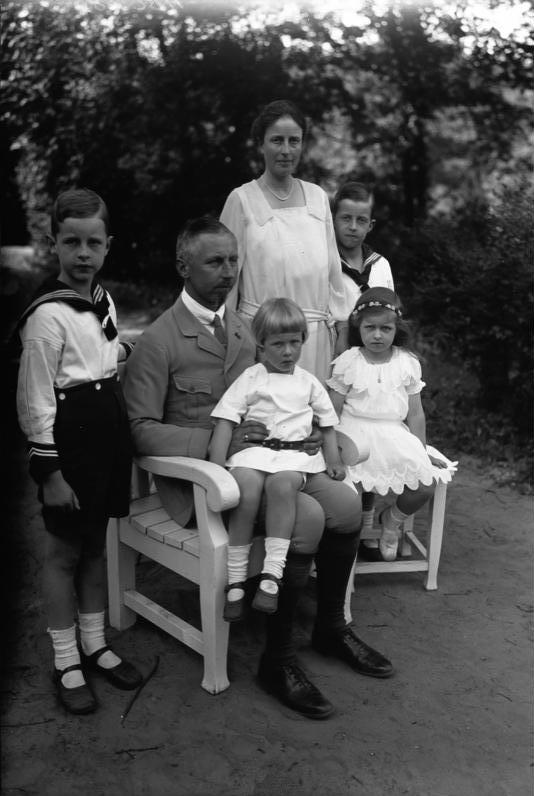
The family of Prince Oskar of Prussia in 1925: the three boys (aged 10, 8, and 3) are wearing Mary Janes.

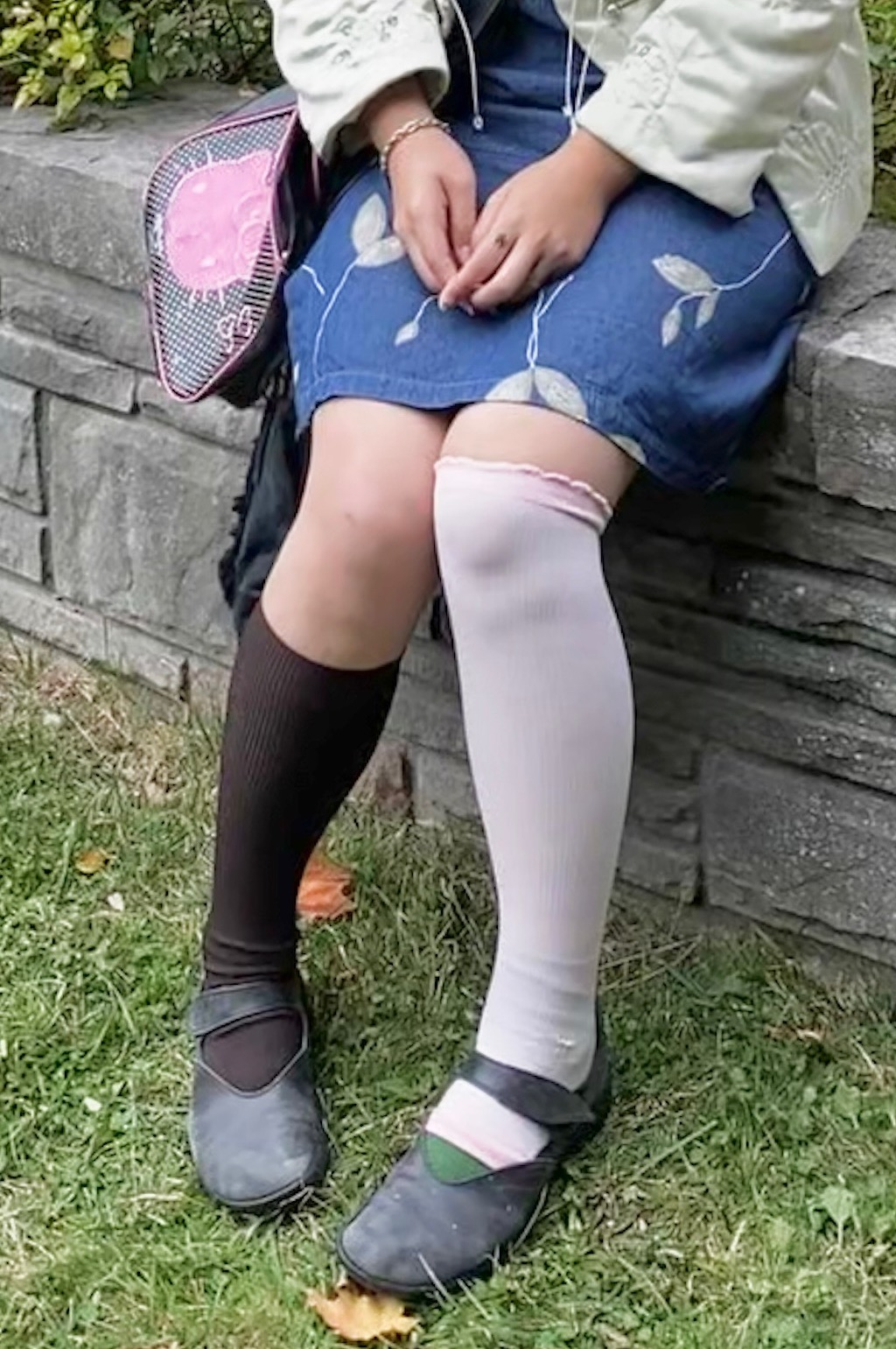
Orthopedic Mary Janes

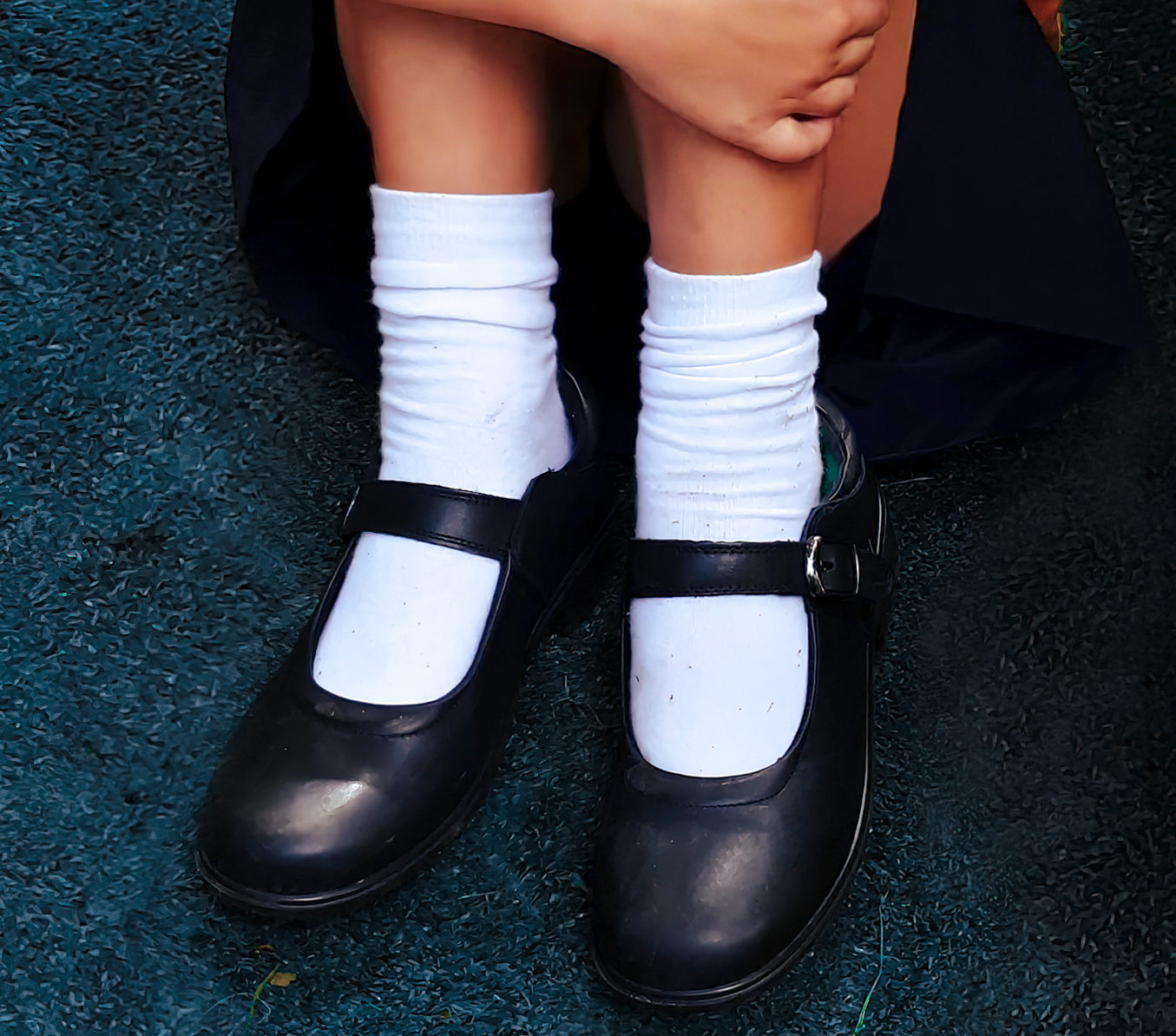
Modern Mary Jane school shoes worn with socks. Usually worn by primary school-aged girls, even in the 21st century.

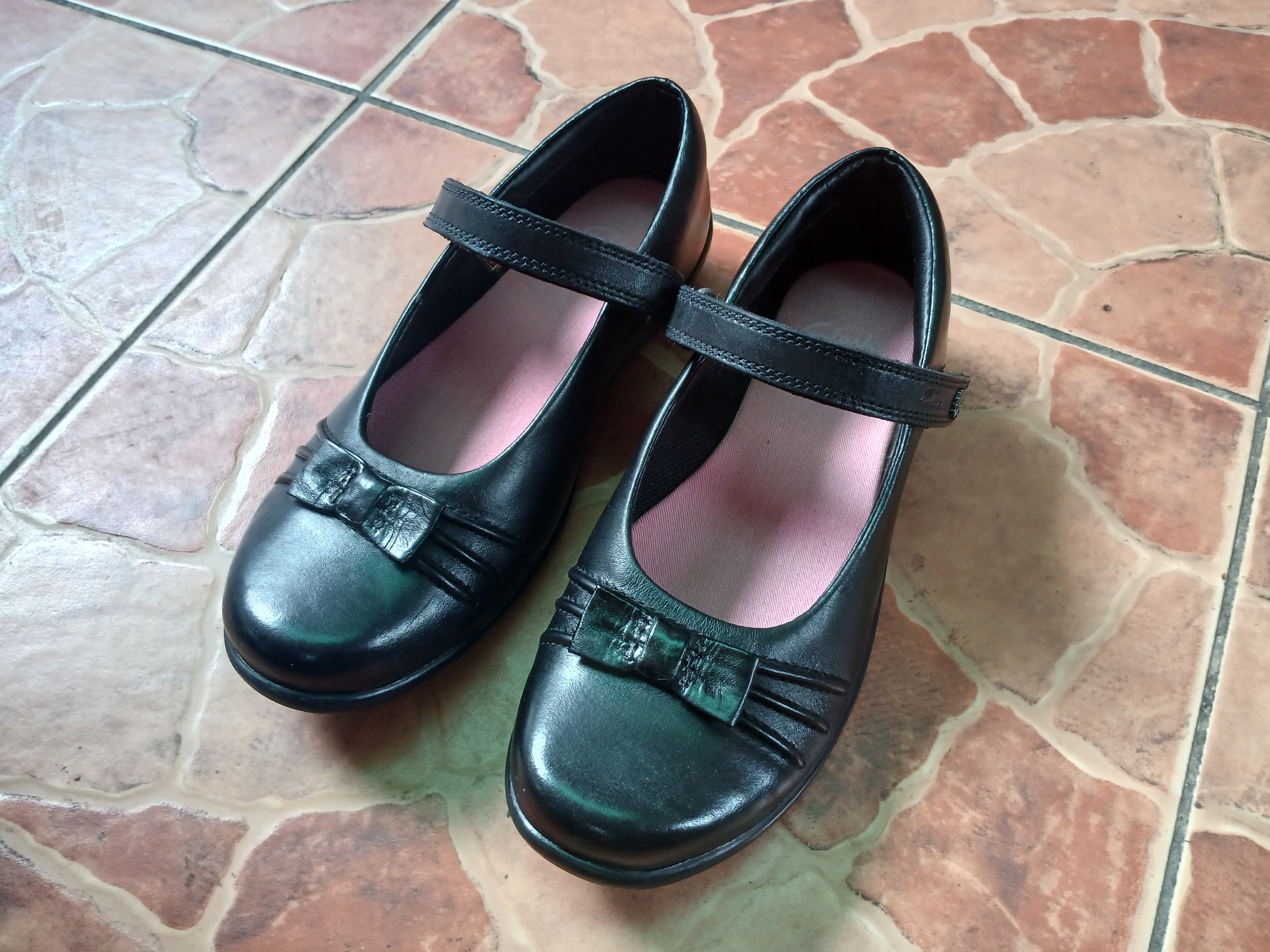
Mary Jane school shoes by Clarks made and sold circa 2012.

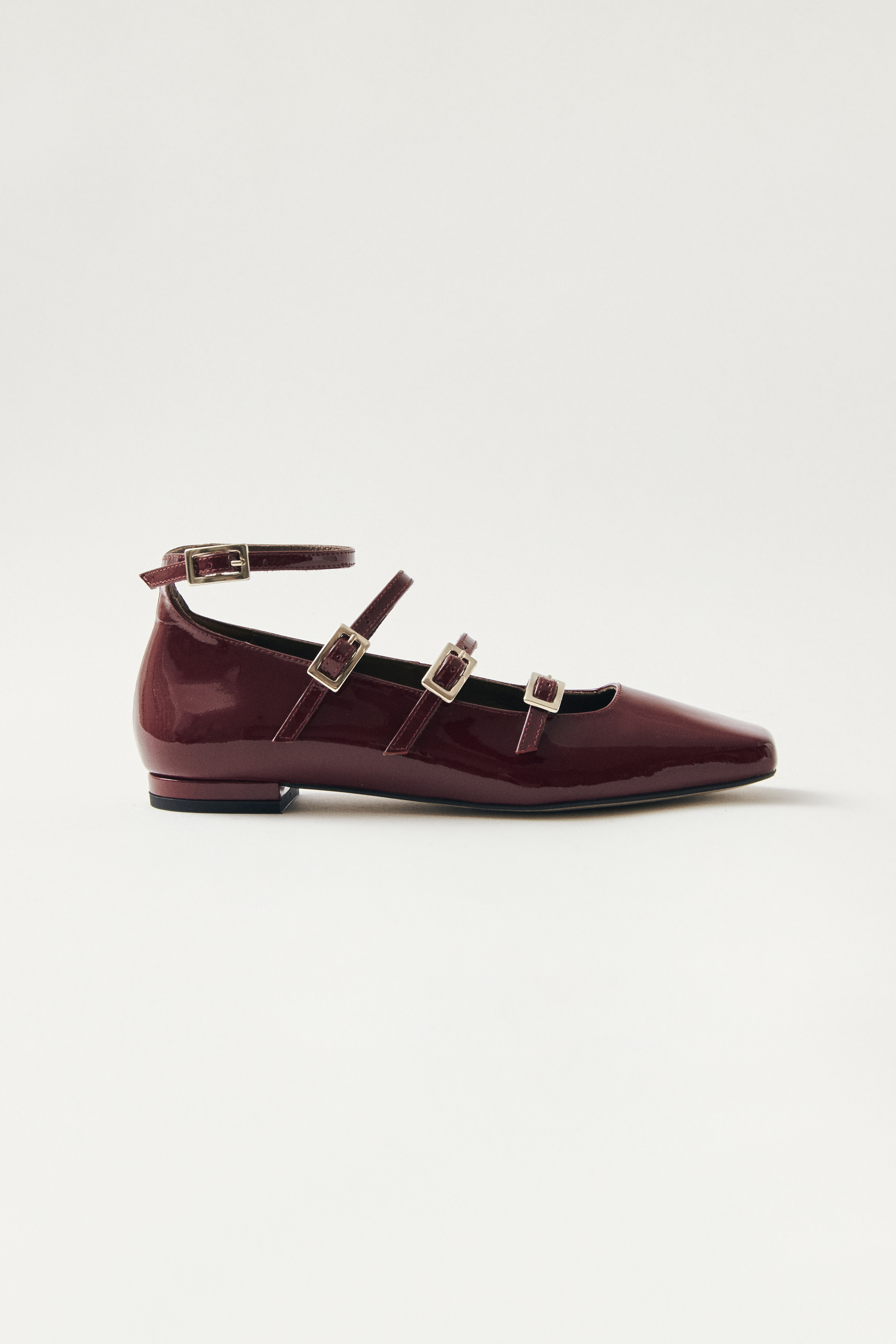
Fashionable Mary Janes for women.

== See also ==
- List of shoe styles
- T-bar sandal—a very similar style
