= Sandal =

Type of footwear with an open upper

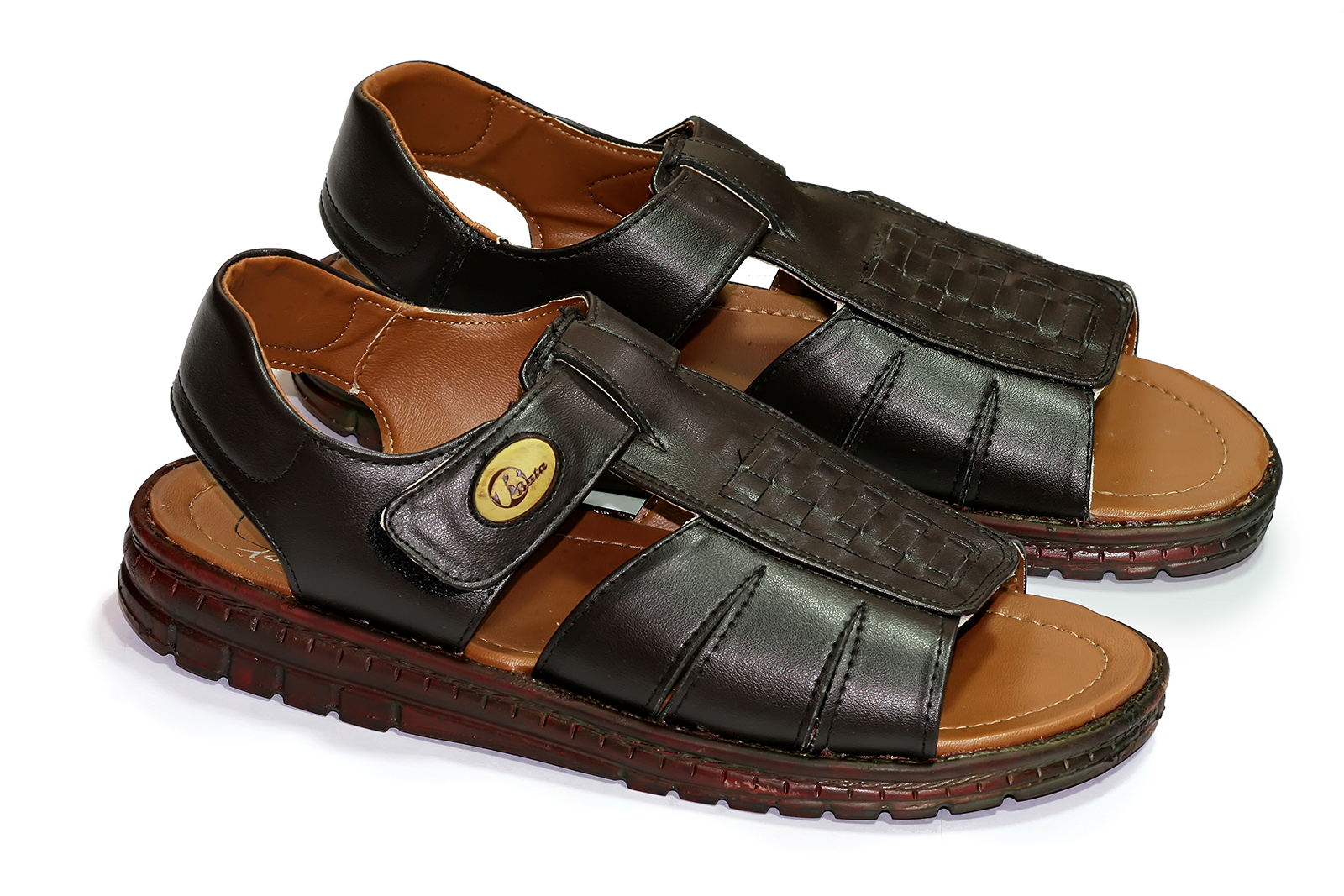
Men's leather sandals

Sandals are an open type of footwear consisting of a sole held to the wearer's foot by straps that go over the instep and around the ankle. Sandals may also feature a heel of varying heights. While the distinction between sandals and other types of footwear can sometimes be unclear (as with huaraches—the woven leather footwear from Mexico—and peep-toe pumps), sandals are generally understood to leave most of the foot exposed.

People choose to wear sandals for several reasons, including comfort in warm weather, economic benefits (sandals typically require less material than closed shoes and are easier to manufacture), and as a fashion statement. Sandals are commonly worn in warmer climates or during warmer seasons to keep feet cool and dry. The open design reduces the risk of developing athlete's foot compared to enclosed shoes, and wearing sandals may be part of the treatment regimen for such infections.

== Name ==
The English word sandal derives from Middle French sandale, which came from the Latin sandalium. The word first appeared in Middle English as sandalies. The Latin term itself derived from Greek sandálion (σανδάλιον), the diminutive of sándalon (σάνδαλον), though the ultimate origin remains uncertain. In Greek, the names referred to particular styles of women's sandals rather than being the general word for the category of footwear. Similarly, in Latin, the name was also used for slippers, the more common term for Roman sandals being solea, whence English sole. The English words sand and sandalwood are both false cognates.

== History ==
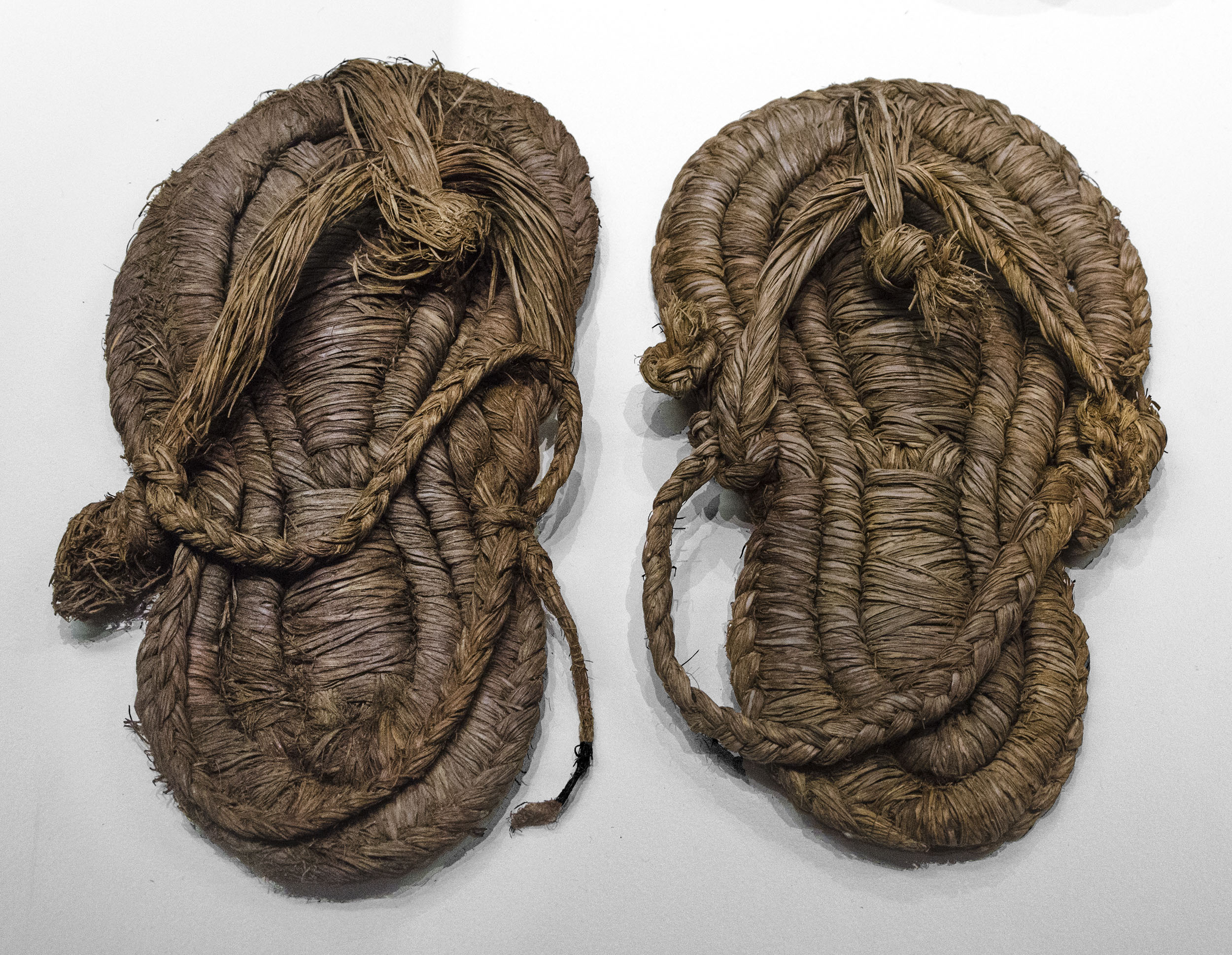
Esparto sandals from the 6th or 5th millennium BC found in Spain.

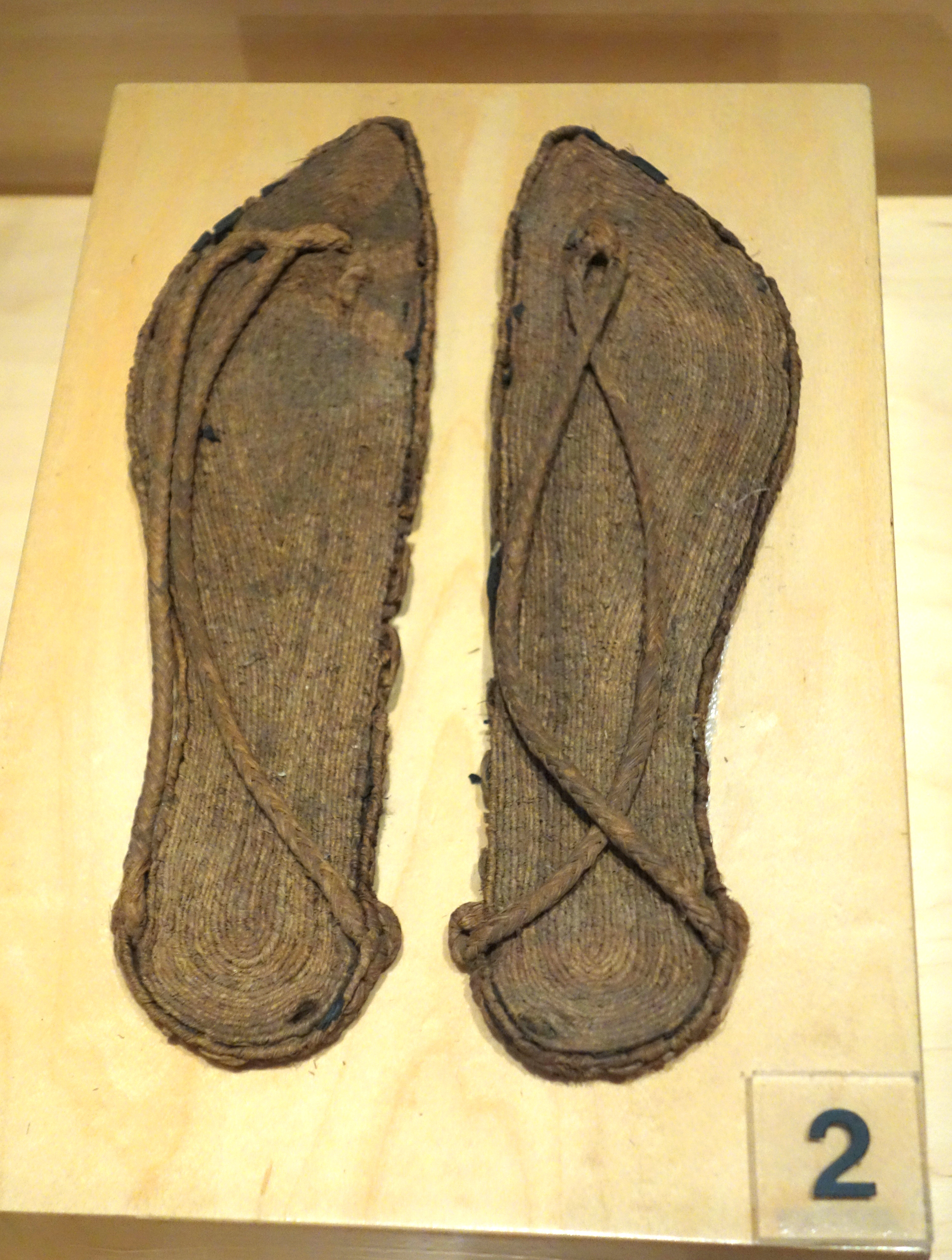
Pair of ancient vegetable fiber sandals from Egypt.

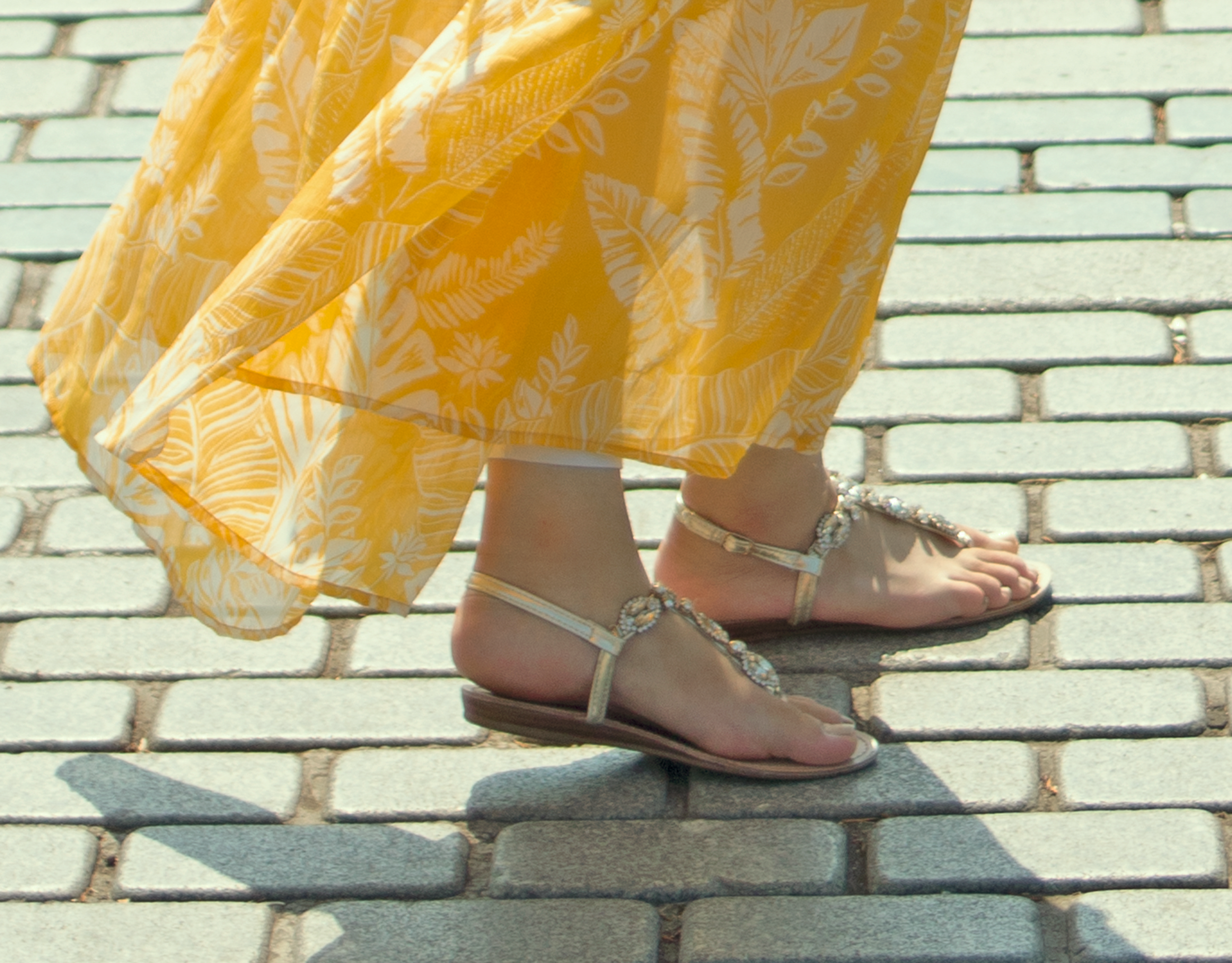
Girl wearing sandals held to the feet by both thong and straps.

Although other types of footwear such as carbatina are equally simple to manufacture, sandals represent the oldest known footwear discovered to date. Pairs of sagebrush sandals found in 1938 at Fort Rock Cave in Oregon, United States, were subsequently dated to between 10,500 and 9,300 years ago.

The ancient Egyptians crafted sandals from palm leaves, papyrus, and—particularly in grave goods—gold. Egyptian statues and reliefs depict sandals both worn on feet and carried by sandal-bearers. According to Herodotus, papyrus footwear was mandatory attire for Egyptian priests. In Mesopotamia, sandals (known as "Biblical sandals") were typically constructed from rawhide and straw or dried grasses. Wealthy individuals often adorned the thongs with gems, gold, or silver beads.

Straw shoes, sometimes in the form of sandals and sometimes carbatinae, were ubiquitous Chinese footwear in antiquity.

In Ancient Greece, sandalia proper were a kind of sandal principally worn by women. The sole was made of wood, cork, or leather and the upper chiefly consisted of a strap between the big toe and second toe and another around the ankle. The sandal of Homer was the pédīlon (πέδῑλον). By the Classical Period, the general term for sandals was hypódēma (ὑπόδημα). Most forms included a strap across the toes (ζυγός, zygós), another strap between the big and second toe, and a third across the instep (lingula); this last was frequently made with metal shaped like a heart or leaf. The rhaḯdia (ῥαΐδια) extended the straps of the sandal up the calf. Some Greek sandals—like the women's tyrrēniká (τυρρηνικά)—employed wooden soles. The effeminate baxea (πάξεια, páxeia) was usually made of willow leaves, twigs, or fibers and was associated with comic actors and philosophers. The tragedians wore the cothurnus (κόθορνος, kóthornos), sandal-like boots that rose above the midcalf and typically incorporated platform soles that led to others wearing them to appear taller. By the Hellenistic Period, some sandals show evidence of extreme ornamentation. One found from the settlements in Greek Crimea was a platform design with 12 separate layers in its sole and gold decoration.

Due to the general discomfort of the typical upper-class calceus, it became standard practice in ancient Rome to change into sandals (solea or crepida) or slippers when at home. It was considered unusual that Augustus seldom followed this custom. However, wearing comfortable shoes in public was deemed effeminate, and criticism of this habit was commonly used as an insult by politicians and writers. Notable figures including Scipio the Elder, Verres, Antony, Germanicus, and Caligula were all specifically criticized for this practice. This social stigma persisted until at least the reign of Hadrian. Because shoes were removed when reclining on couches to dine, it was normal to wear slippers or sandals to meals even at other houses. Due to this social stigma, when a litter carried by slaves was unavailable for transport between houses, proper etiquette required walking to the destination wearing calcei while carrying the indoor footwear under one's arm. Guests would then change shoes in the entryway before having slaves remove their dining footwear in the dining room.

In his autobiography Edward Carpenter told how sandals came to be made in England:

While in India Harold Cox went in [18]85 or [18]86 for a tour in Cashmere, and from Cashmere he sent me a pair of Indian sandals. I had asked him, before he went out, to send some likely pattern of sandals, as I felt anxious to try some myself. I soon found the joy of wearing them. And after a little time I set about making them. I got two or three lessons from W. Lill, a bootmaker friend in Sheffield, and soon succeeded in making a good many pairs for myself and various friends. Since then the trade has grown into quite a substantial one. G. Adams took it up at Millthorpe in 1889; making, I suppose, about a hundred or more pairs a year; and since his death it has been carried on at the Garden City, Letchworth.

=== Types ===
Kitten heel

== Construction ==
Anatomy of a sandal

A sandal may feature a sole constructed from various materials including rubber, leather, wood, tatami, or rope. The sole is typically secured to the foot either by a narrow thong that passes between the first and second toe, or by straps or laces (variously called latchets, sabot straps, or sandal straps) that cross over the arch of the foot or wrap around the ankle. Sandals may optionally include a heel of varying heights (from low to high) and may feature heel straps for additional security.

== Variants ==
- Barefoot sandals, footwear with the appearance of sandals but lacking a sole.
- Birkenstock sandals, a comfortable and trendy sandal made from cork.
- Caligae, a heavy-soled classical Roman military shoe or sandal for marching, worn by all ranks up to and including centurion
- Carbatina, open footwear worn in ancient Greece, Italy and the Middle East
- Clip-on sandals or clip-toe sandals, a style similar to flip-flops
- Crocs, clog-like shoes made from synthetic, rubbery, waterproof material, first created in the United States in 2002
- Clog can be formed as a heavy sandal, having a thick, typically wooden sole
- Crochet sandals
- Fisherman sandal is a type of T-bar sandal originally for men and boys. The toes are enclosed by a number of leather bands interwoven with the central length-wise strap that lies along the instep. An adjustable cross strap or bar is fastened with a buckle. The heel may be fully enclosed or secured by a single strap joined to the cross strap. The style appears to have originated in France.
- Flip-flops (called thongs in Australia) are typically cheap and suitable for beach, pool, or locker room wear
- Geta, a classical Japanese form of elevated thong, traditionally of cryptomeria wood; the crosspiece is referred to as a ha, which translates to tooth
- Grecian sandal, sandals from Greece and Salento (Italy), a (generally flat or low) sole attached to the foot by interlaced straps crossing the toes and instep, and fastening around the ankle. A similar style is sometimes called gladiator sandal
- High-heeled sandal, a type of sandal with an elevated heel. They allow the wearer to have an open shoe while being less casual or more formal, depending on the style of the sandal.
- Hiking and trekking sandals are designed for hiking or trekking in hot and tropical climates, usually using robust rubber outsole, suitable for any terrain, and softer EVA or Super EVA foam insole. These sandals are usually shaped to support the arched contour of the foot. The straps are usually made of polyester or nylon webbing for quick drying after exposure to water and to minimize perspiration. Also suitable for many other adventure sports and activities where quick drying and reduced perspiration is required, including rafting, traveling, paragliding, skydiving.
- Ho Chi Minh sandals is one name for a homemade or cottage industry footwear, the soles cut from an old automobile tire and the straps cut from an inner tube. Made and worn in many countries, they became wider known in the US as worn by the rural people of Indochina during the Vietnam War, leading to the name.
- Huarache, a Mexican sandal, with sole made of a tire tread, or huarache (running shoe), a flat sandal used by minimalist runners.
- Jelly sandals or jelly shoes were originally a version of the classic fisherman sandal made in PVC plastic. They were invented in 1946 by Frenchman Jean Dauphant in response to a post-war leather shortage. Later designs featured translucent soft plastic in bright colours; hence the later name of jelly sandals or jellies. Recently, a whole range of styles have been produced in this material, mainly for women and girls, but the classic unisex design remains popular.
- Jesuslatschen
- Jipsin, a traditional Korean sandal made of straw
- Ojota, an extremely durable Peruvian sandal made of recycled tires that is traditionally worn in the Andes by Quechua people.
- Paduka are the ancient (the time of the Ramayana) Indian toe-knob sandals. They are not really worn on a daily basis now except by monks or for ceremonial purposes.
- Patten, a type of oversized clog often with a wooden sole or metal device to elevate the foot and increase the wearer's height or aid in walking in mud
- Roman sandal, a sandal held to the foot by a vamp composed of a series of equally spaced, buckled straps
- Saltwater sandals, a flat sandal developed in the 1940s as a way of coping with wartime leather shortages, primarily worn by children
- Soft foam sandals, invented in 1973, are made from closed-cell soft foam and uses surgical tubing for the straps. They are sold primarily along the Texas Gulf Coast in beach side gift shops.
- Strappy sandals, open footwear characterized by multiple straps that secure the sole to the foot
- T-bar sandals, primarily for children, with an enclosed heel and toe. It is fastened by a cross-wise strap or bar secured by a buckle, or more recently by Velcro. A length-wise strap extends from the vamp and joins the cross-strap over the arch of the foot to form a T shape. A common variant has two cross-straps. The toe is often pierced with a pattern of holes or slots. The sole is low-heeled and usually of crepe rubber, stitched-down to the upper. First seen in Europe and America in the early 20th century, by the 1950s they were very common for boys and girls up to their teens, but are now mainly worn by much younger children. This style or similar styles are also called "Mary Jane" shoes.
- Upanah, ancient Indian sandals
- Waraji, Japanese straw sandals common in the Edo period
- Wörishofer, a ladies' sandal with a cork wedge heel
- Zōri, a flat and thonged Japanese sandal, usually made of straw, cloth, leather, or rubber

== Gallery ==
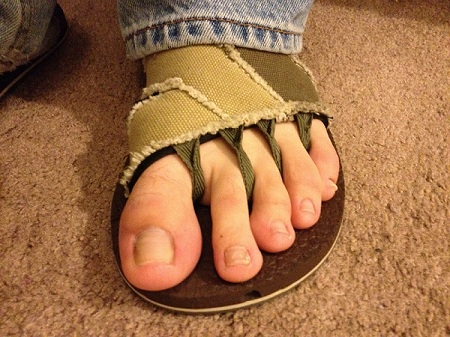
Yoga sandals have thongs that pass between all of the toes.

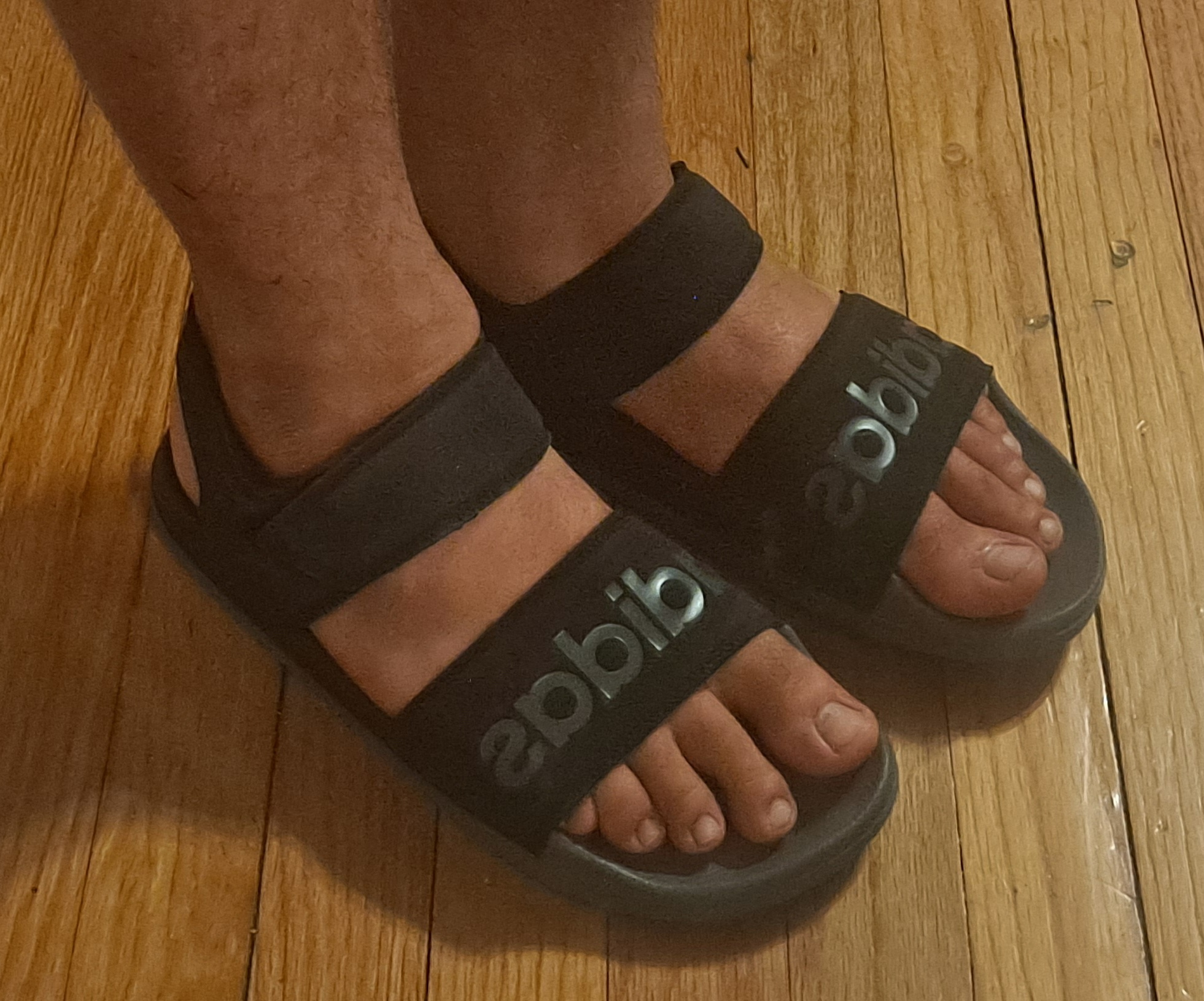
Man wearing sandals

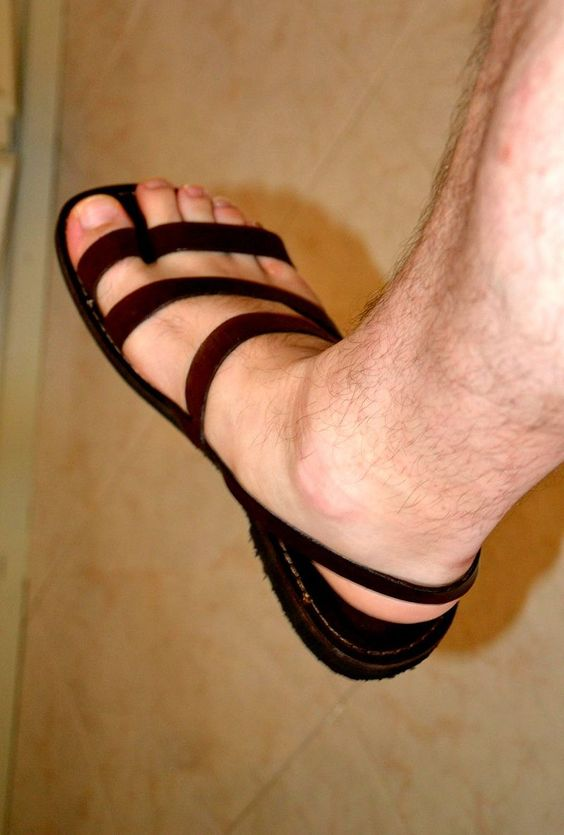
Grecian sandals.

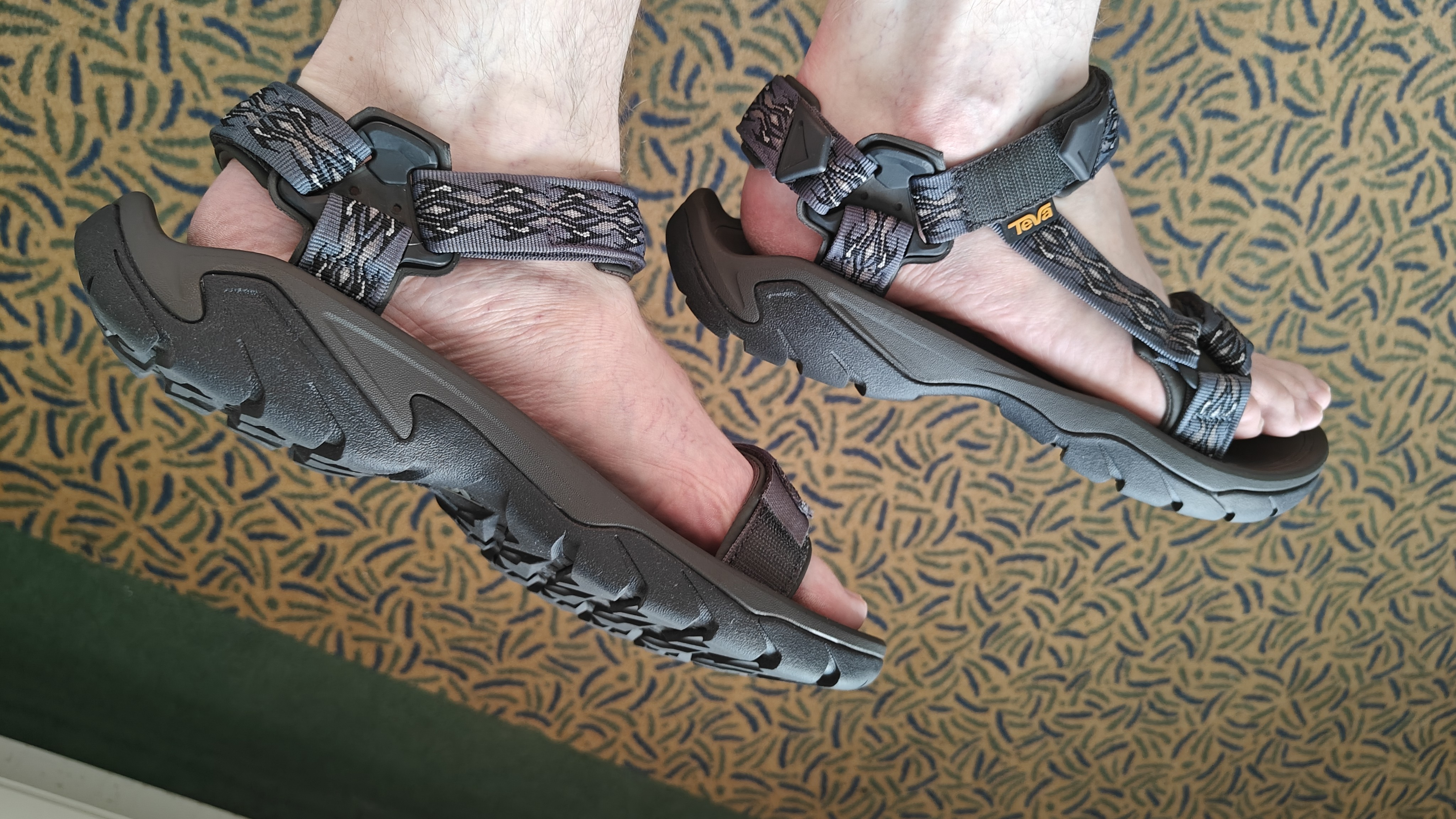
Hiking/sport sandals.

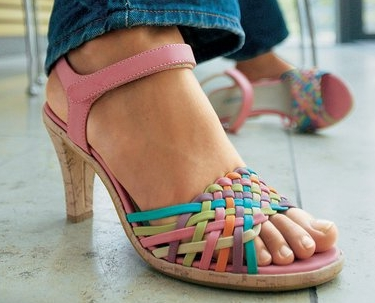
High-heeled sandals.

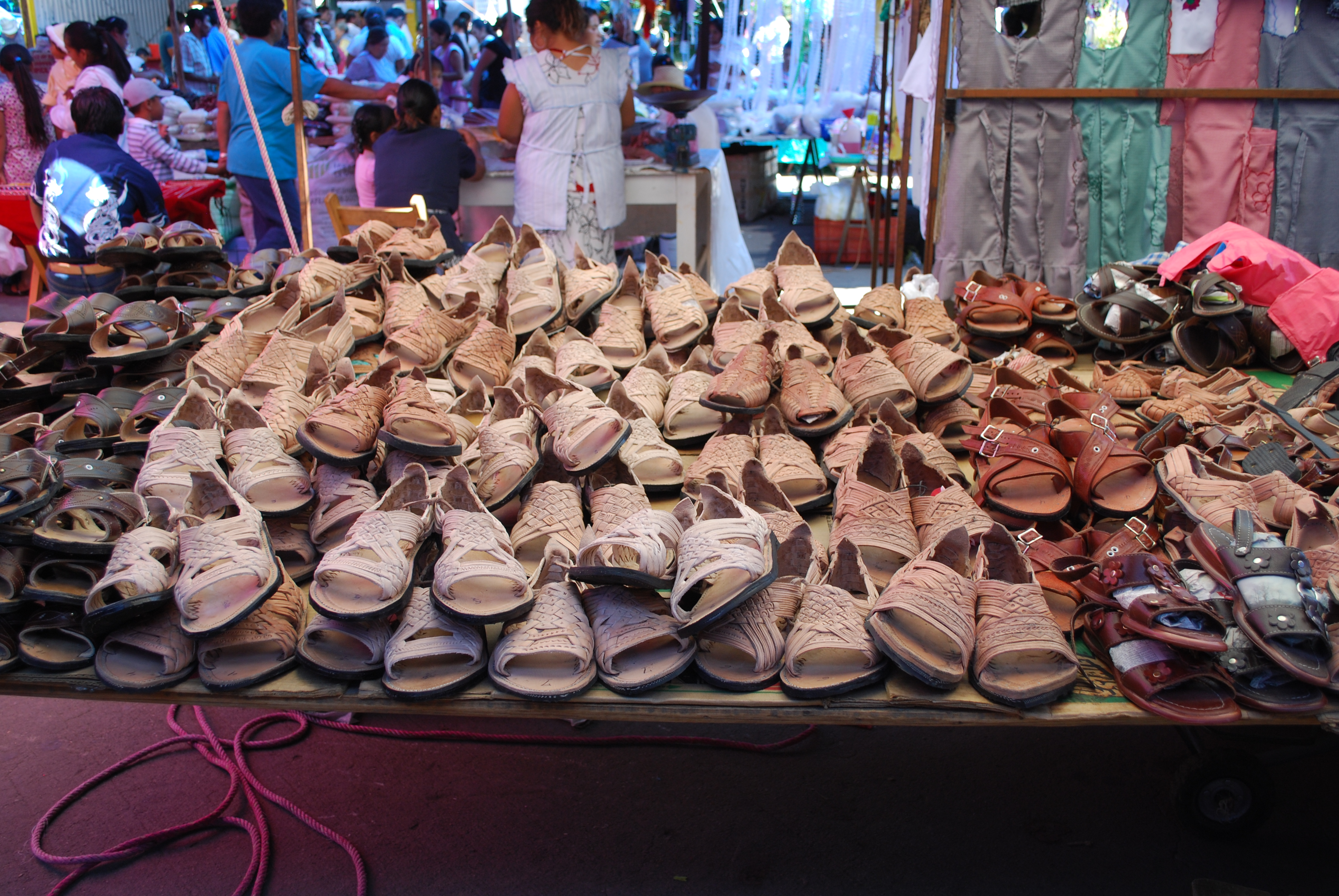
Mexican sandals

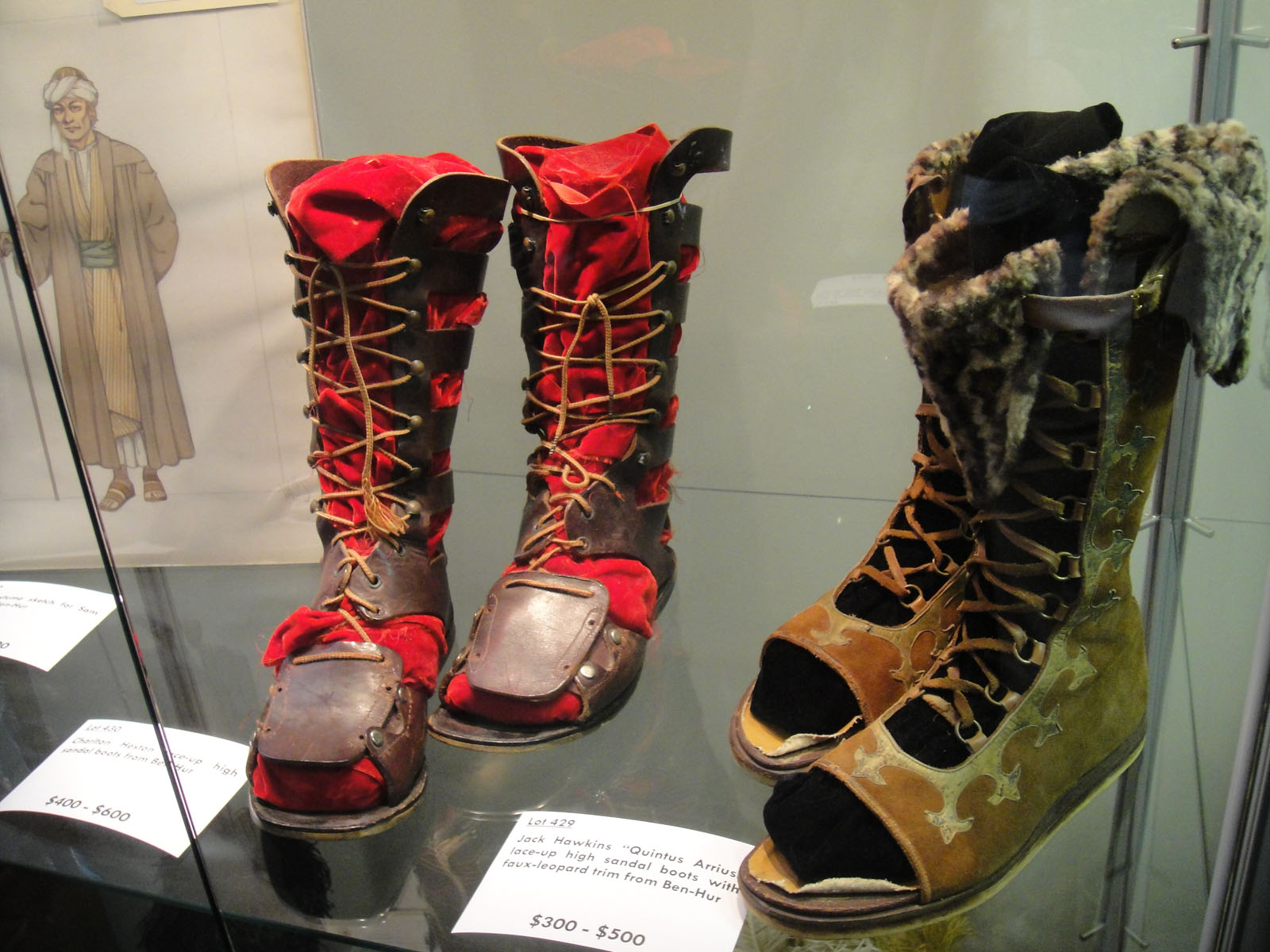
Charlton Heston and Jack Hawkins's caliga sandal-boots from the American film Ben-Hur

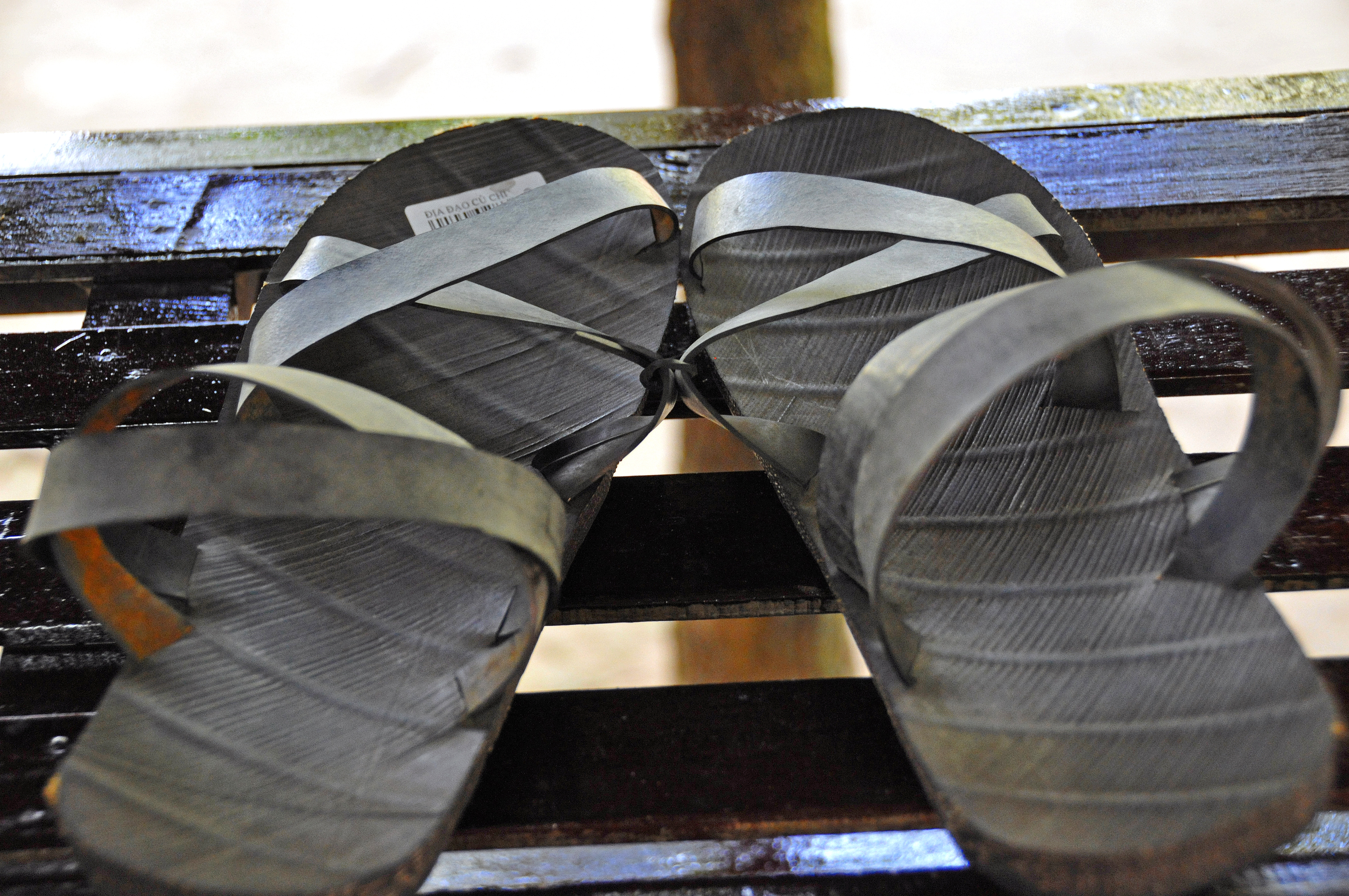
Vietnamese sandal

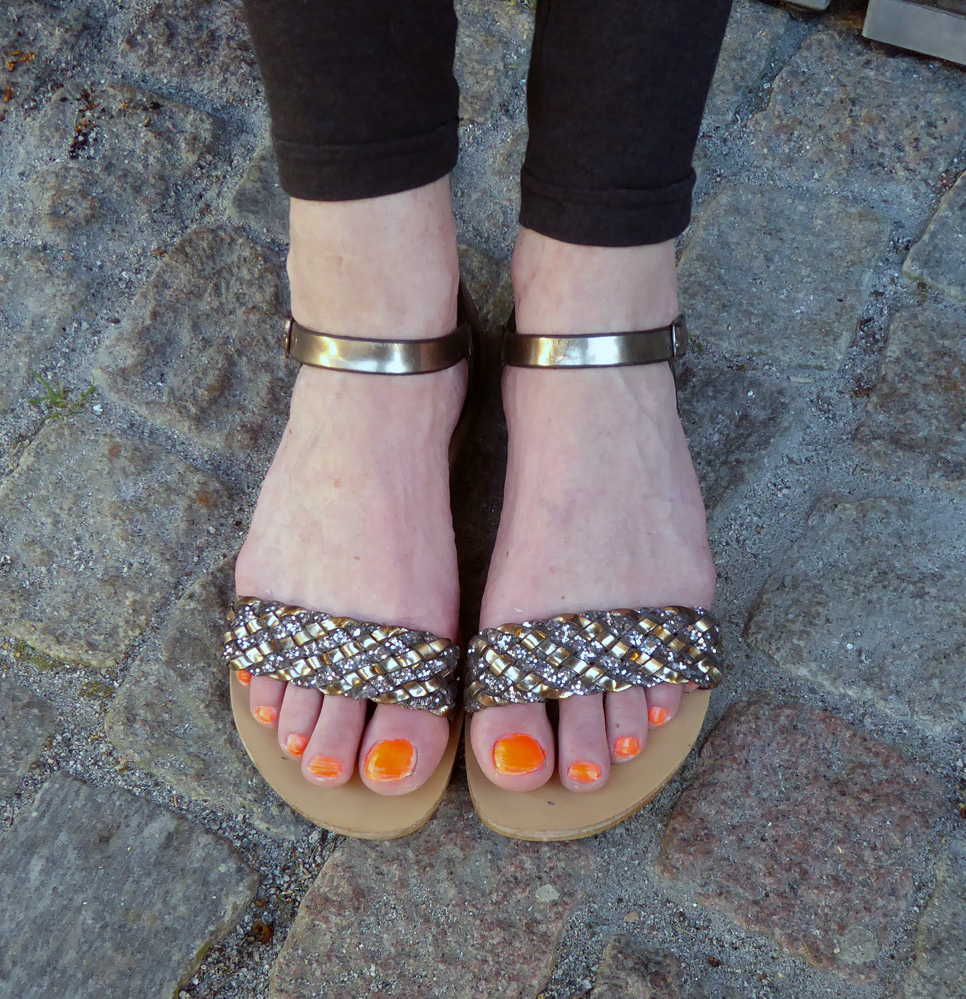
Low heel sandals

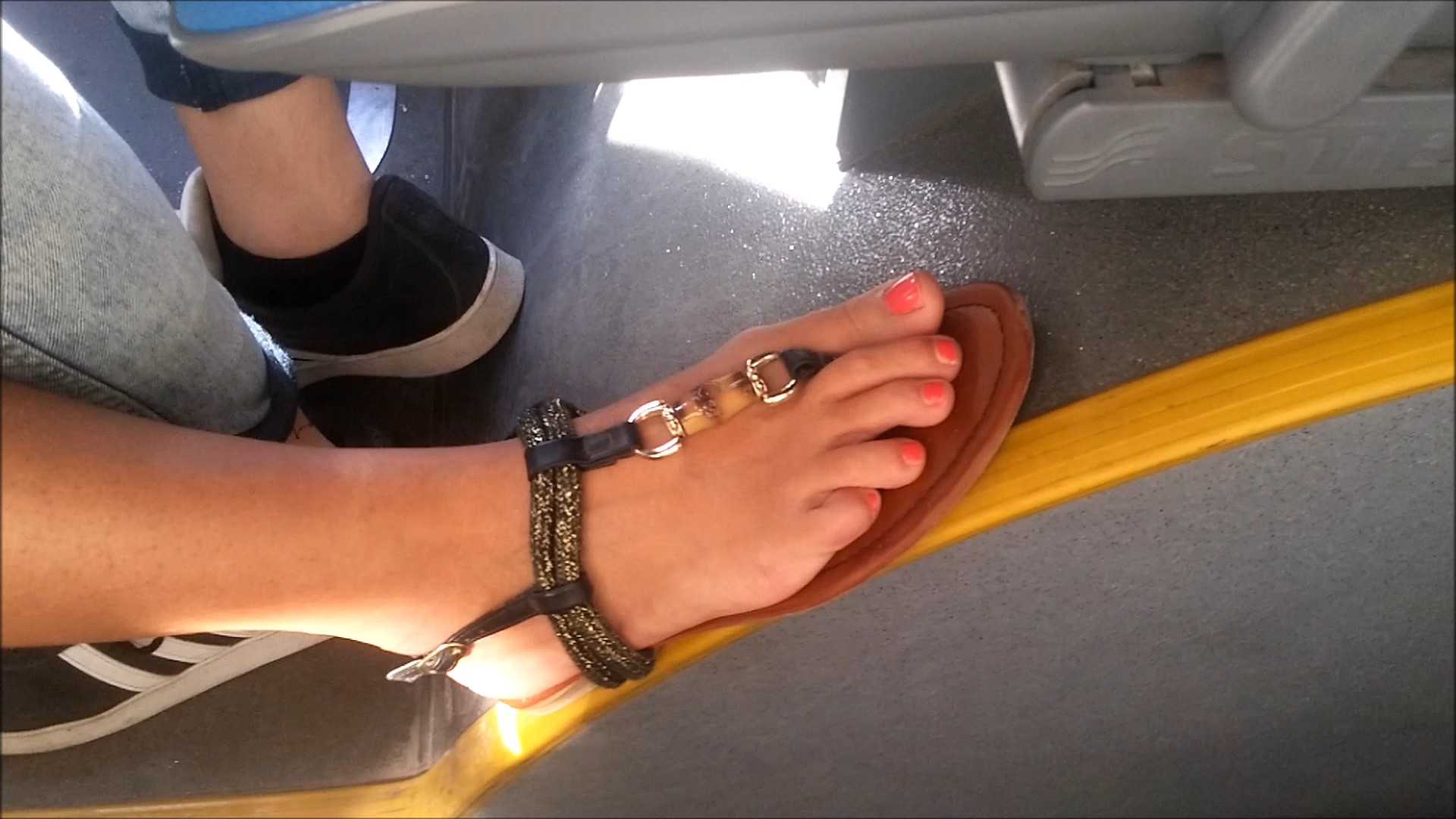
Sandals with a toe thong

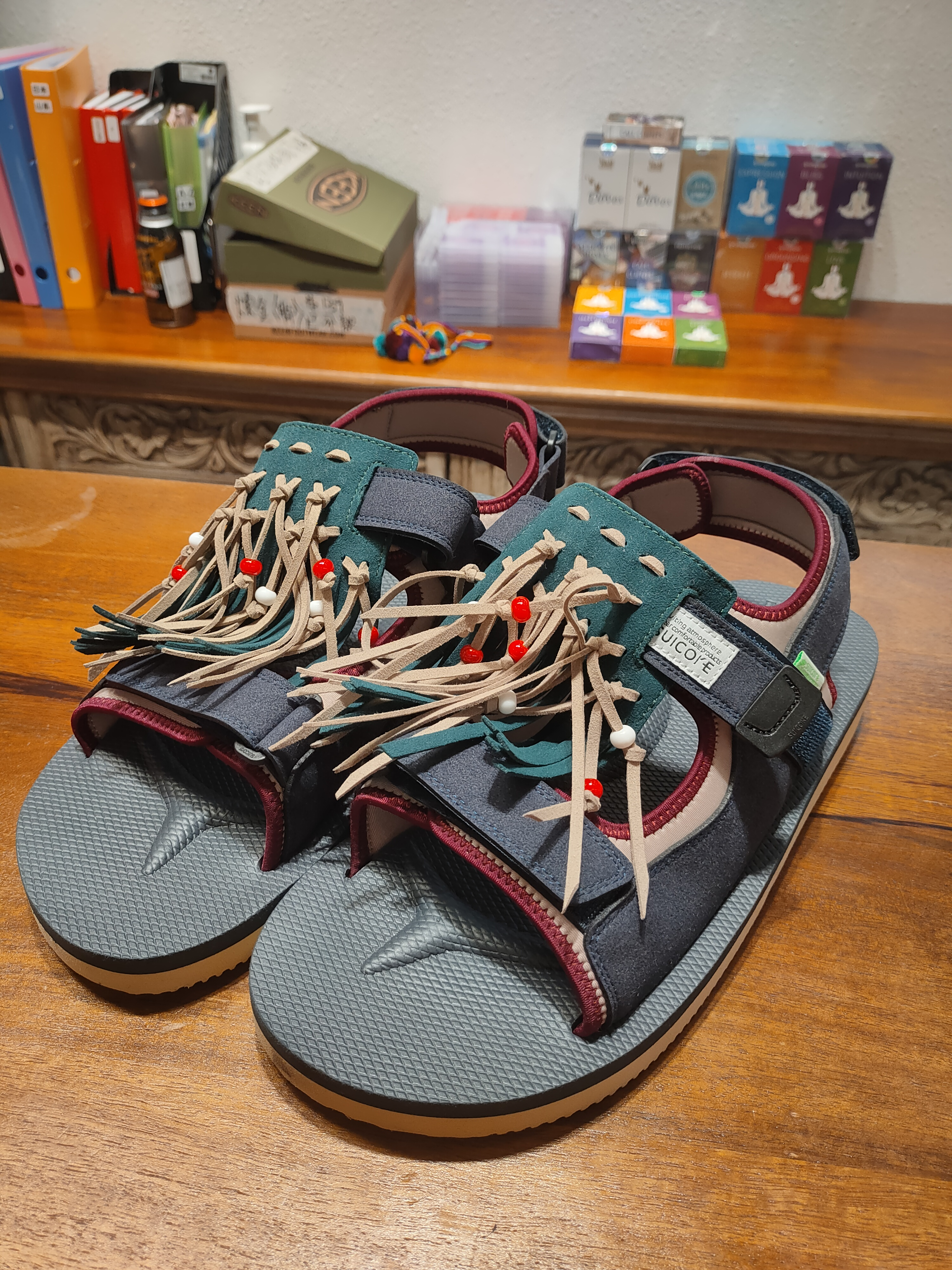
Fashion sandals

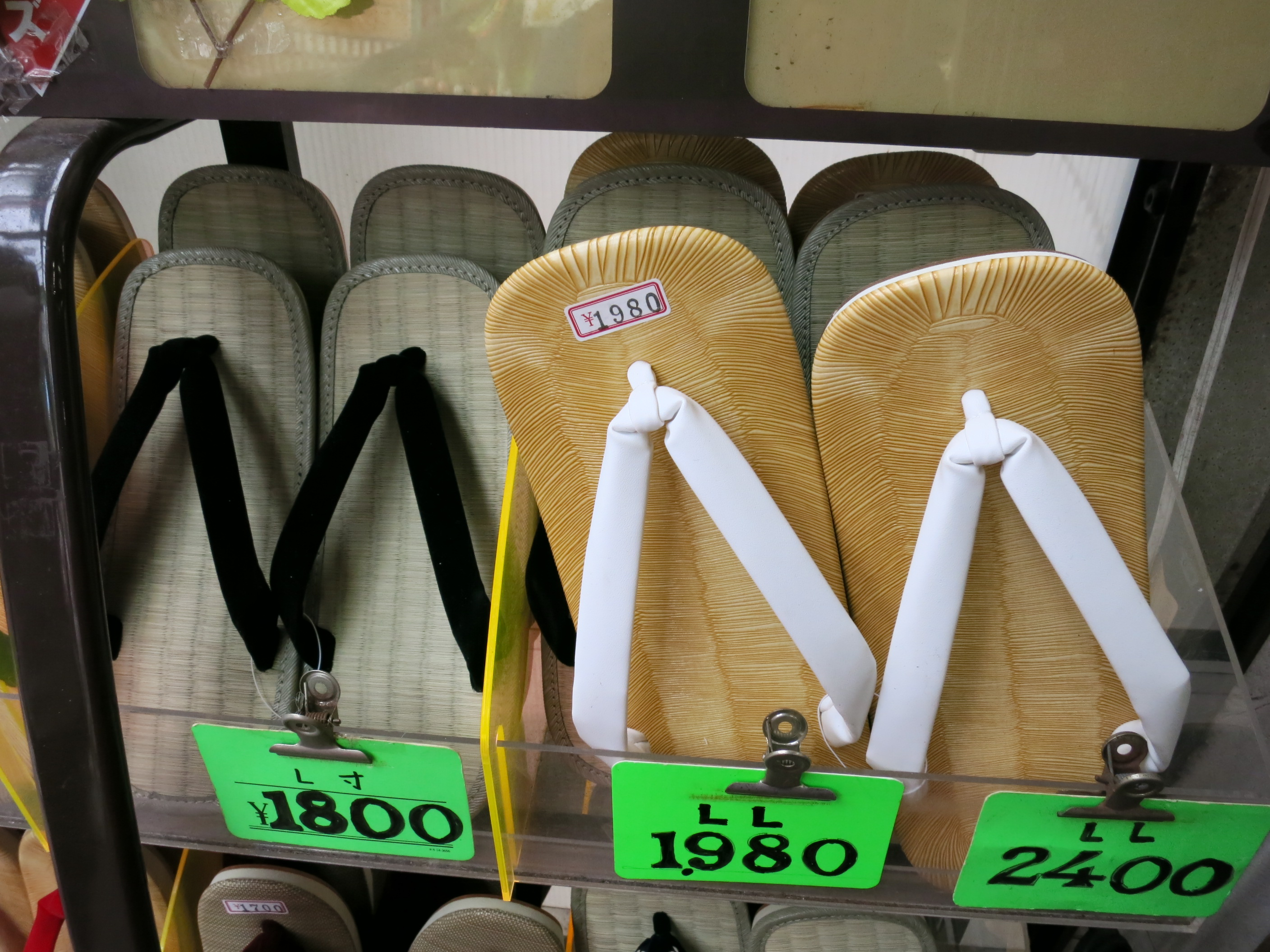
Japanese zori

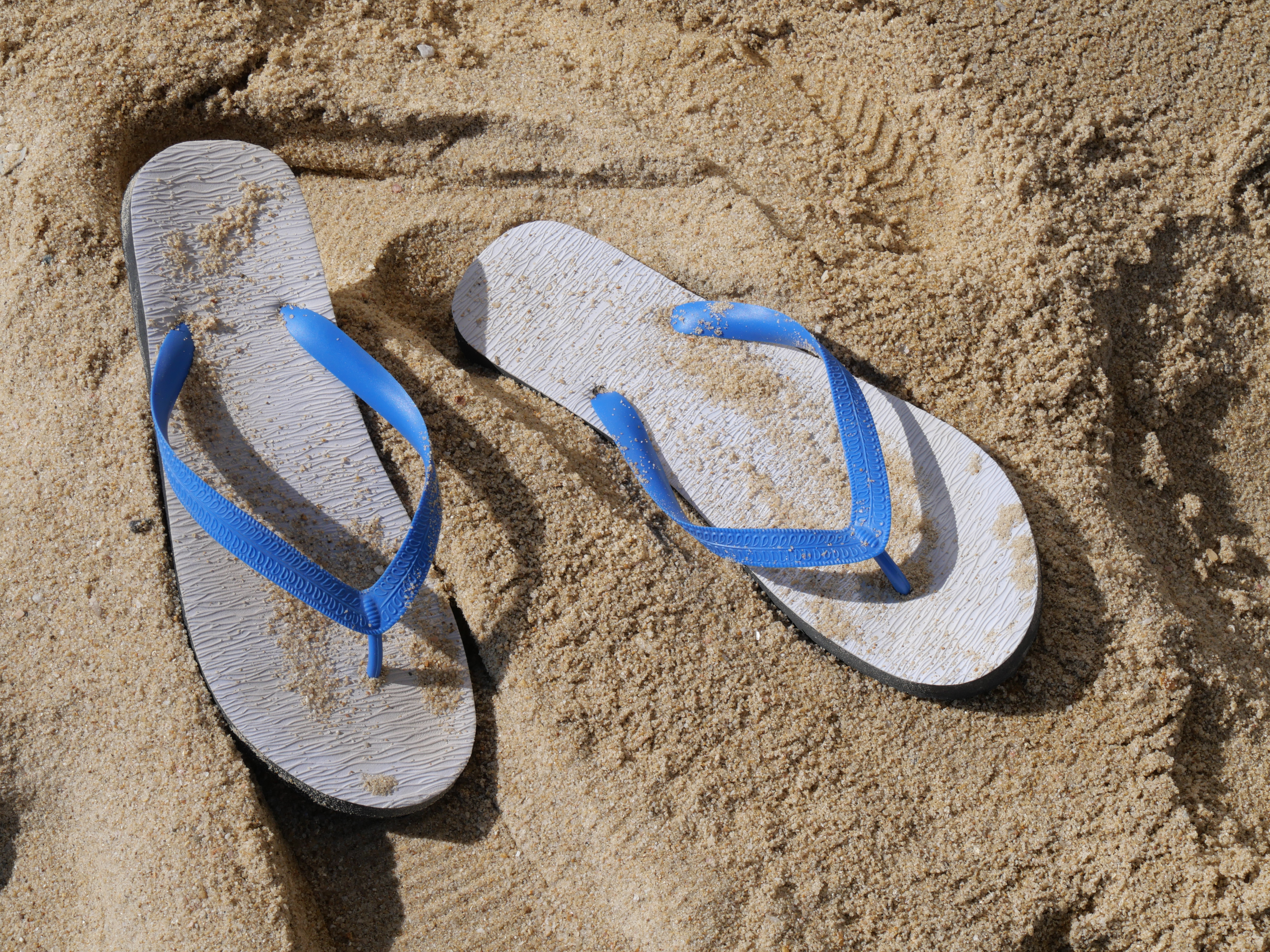
Flip-flops

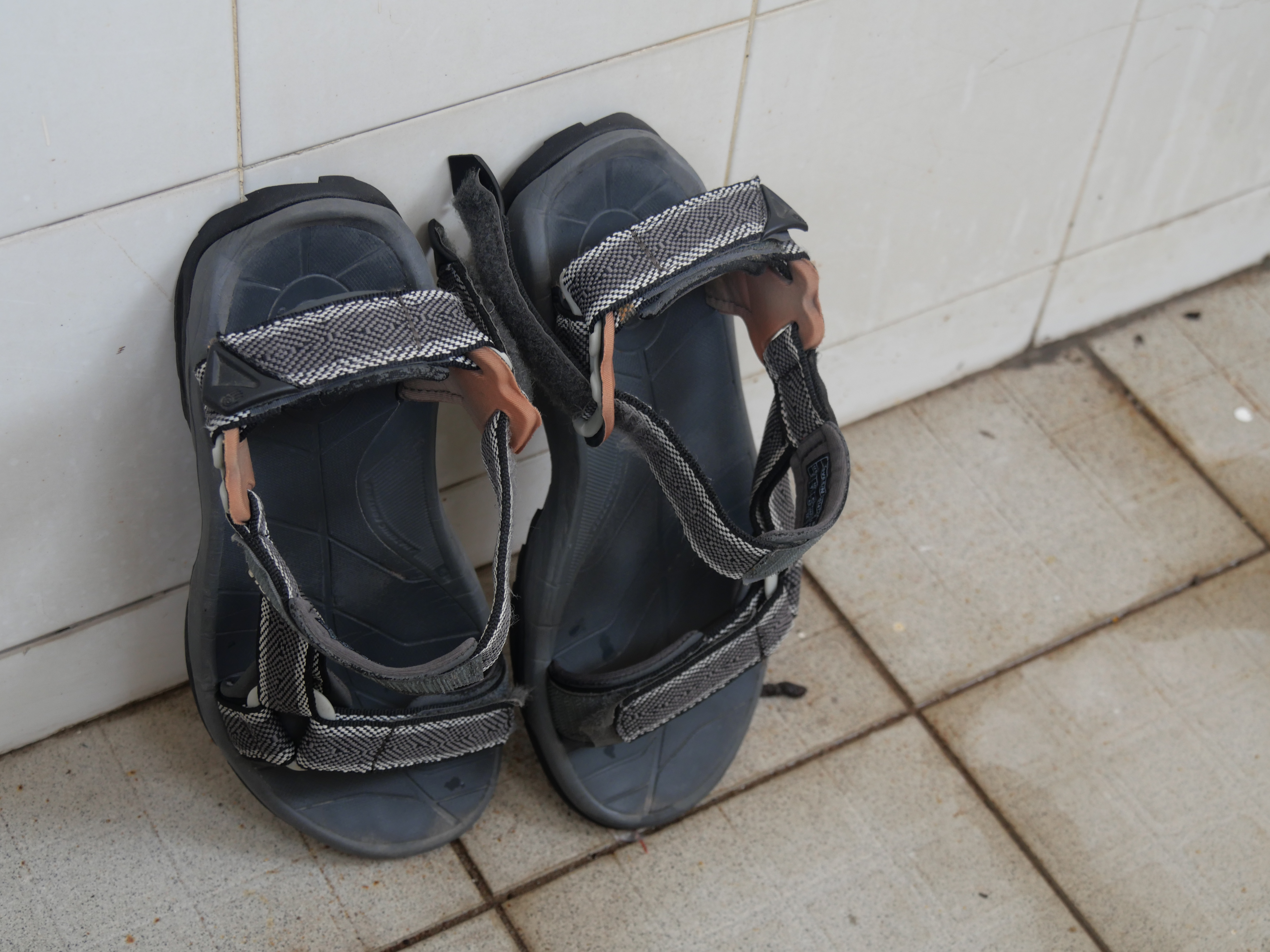
Hiking sandals

== See also ==
- Birkenstock
- Crocs
- Keens
- List of shoe styles
- Mules
- Slipper
- Socks and sandals
