= Wörishofer =

Wörishofer is a type of orthopaedic ladies' sandal made in Bad Wörishofen. They have a cork wedge in the sole which is light and acts as a shock absorber. They were first designed in the 1940s and have been considered practical but ugly. But in 2010, they became fashionable, being worn by celebrities such as Kirsten Dunst and Maggie Gyllenhaal. They may be compared to other practical shoes which have been fashionable, including Birkenstocks, crocs, Dr. Martens, Dr. Scholl's and Ugg boots.

Podiatrist Beverley Ashdown rated them 8/10 in a comparison with other fashionable ugly shoes.

== See also ==
- List of shoe styles
