= Carl Beines =

German violinist

Carl Beines (15 December 1869 in Rheydt, a borough of Mönchengladbach – 7 October 1950 in Bad Wörishofen) was a German violinist, who for ten years led the Gürzenich Orchestra in Cologne, as well as a pianist, composer, choir director and singing teacher. His most famous pupils were the tenors Richard Tauber and Herbert Ernst Groh, and the baritones Joseph Hermann and Gotthelf Pistor. Tauber trained with him between 1911 and 1913 in Freiburg im Breisgau, where Beines directed the Concordia Choir. It was at one of their concerts on 17 May 1912 that Tauber made his debut. Later Beines lived and taught in Darmstadt, and finally in Bad Wörishofen, where he died.
