= Jelly shoes =

Type of shoe made of PVC plastic

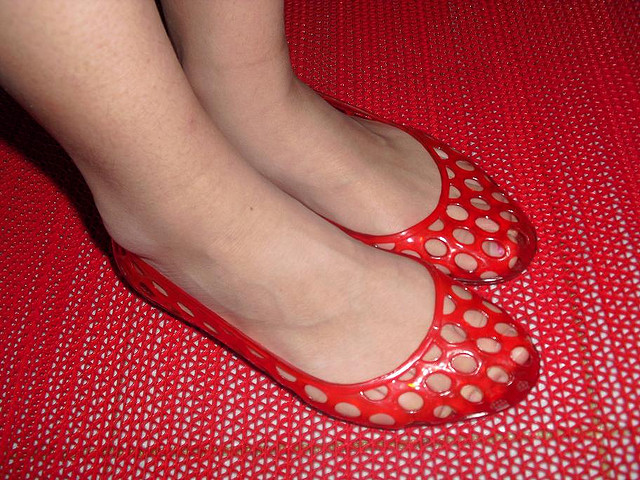
A woman wearing jelly ballet flats

Jelly shoes, or jellies, are a type of shoe made of PVC plastic. Jelly shoes come in a large variety of brands and colours, and the material is often infused with glitter. Its name comes from the French company called Jelly Shoes, founded by Tony Alano and Nicolas Guillon in 1980 in Paris.

Although PVC-injected shoes were created after WWII, they were cheap but at first lesser known. The shoes became a fashion trend in the early 1980s after the shoes of the company Jelly Shoes appeared in major French and European magazines, Paris fashion shows, and shoe fairs. Like many other fashion trends from the 1980s, jellies have been revived a number of times since the late 1990s.

== History ==
=== Post-war plastic shoes ===
After world war II, man-made materials such as plastics were cheap alternatives to natural textiles, such as leather or cotton. The French company Sarraizienne claims to have created the first shoe in PVC in the 50's, and they were used by fishermen for their low price and ease of cleaning. The transparent shoes were sold in large baskets and depreciated in terms of fashion.

=== The creation of Jelly Shoes ===
In 1980, Brazilian Tony Alano and French Nicolas Guillon were living in Paris in their 20's. Whilst on Holidays in Spain, they had an idea to transform the cheap, ugly, transparent and depreciated shrimp fishermen's shoe into a fun, colorful, urban and fashionable shoe. With a loan from Nicolas's mother, they purchase two hundred Sarrazienne's 'fisherman's' shoes and with the help of Tony's brother, a chemist, they create a special dye. Tony and Nicolas then dyed the shoes in their kitchen, dried them in their bathroom, and packaged the product in their living room. Because they were handmade, the shoes had a diverse color palette with many colors not yet seen in modern footwear. They then sold the shoes at a Parisian boutique for prices between 60 and 140 Francs, around 5-10 times more than they were found in the supermarkets. There is also an account that the friendship Tony had with artist Salvador Dalí in Paris inspired the creation of Jelly Shoes.

=== Early days, the frenzy, and today ===
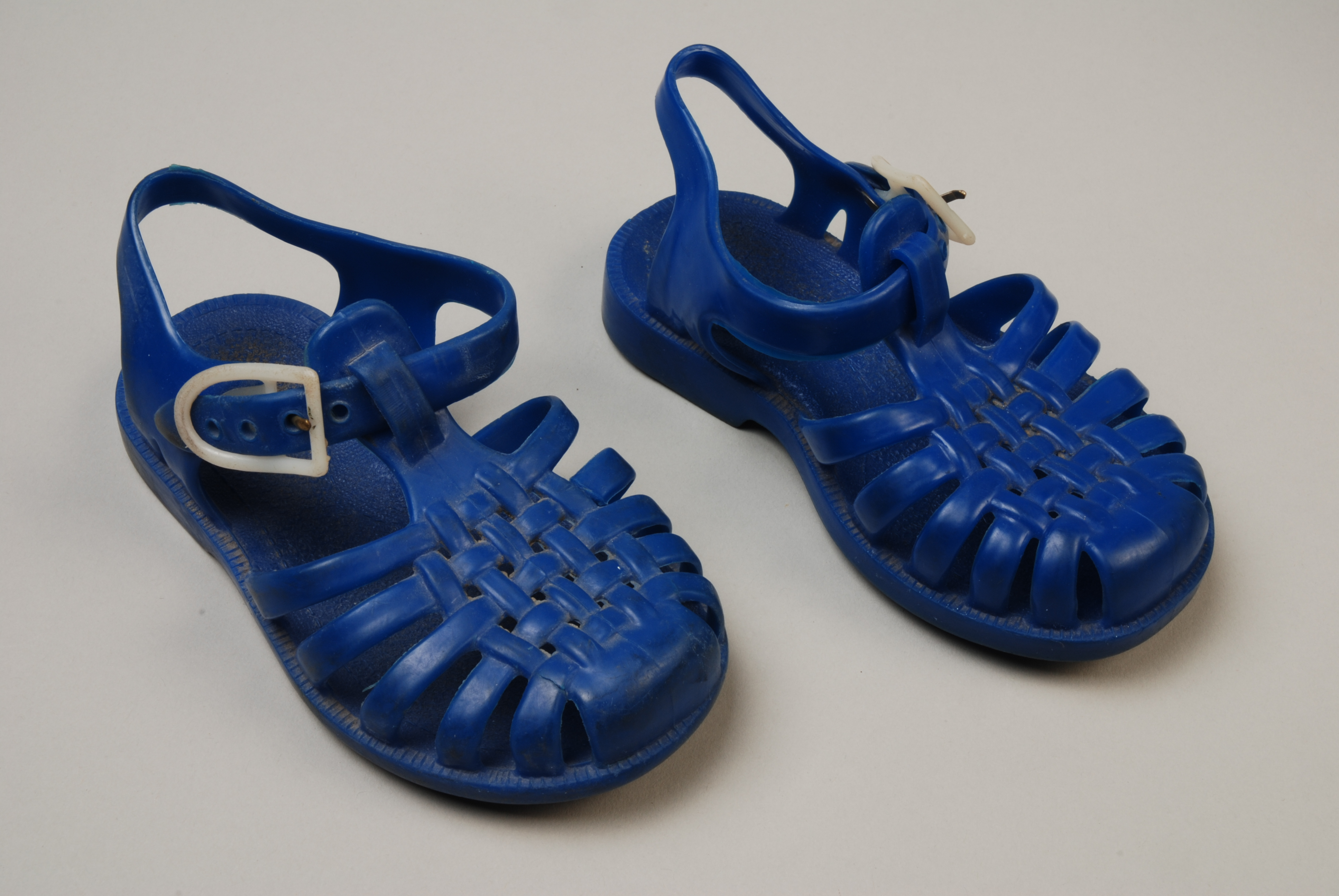
Typical children's jelly shoes dating from the 1980s

Jelly Shoes early summer models were bright, colorful and sometimes glitter-infused. They came in 12 colors and had a vanilla or lemon perfume. The winter models, or "Robin Hood" boots, were walking shoes with laces and jacquard lining, and escarpins decorated with a bow tie.

The shoes were original and audacious and since the shoes were distributed in boutiques in Paris, many magazines, shoemakers, and other boutiques started to take notice.

In 1981, the company Jelly Shoes and their supplier, Sarrazienne, the French fisherman's shoe manufacturer, had a dispute as Sarrazienne allegedly broke their exclusivity contract and sold Jelly Shoes's models to other clients.

Jelly Shoes then closed a contract with the Brazilian plastic shoe manufacturer and exporter Grendene in 1982 (a global plastic shoe company that would become the biggest plastic shoe manufacturer in the world).

A year later the shoes garnered popularity in media and in stores. The Jelly Shoes company grew their sales of shoes 20 times the number in the following year. French fashion magazines were displaying Jelly Shoes in collections and covering them in articles. Stylists such as Thierry Mugler and Jean-Paul Gaultier were designing Jelly Shoes. The plastic shoe had become an item of fashion. Boutiques and stores worldwide, influenced by Parisian fashions, started ordering an growing number of these shoes.

In the United States in 1983, Doris Johanson of the New York department store Bloomingdale's ordered 2400 pairs of a model of Jelly Shoes she had spotted in Europe. Grendene served that order with the brand Grendha in the USA.

Newspapers and magazines started to cover the story. Meanwhile, the Brazilian manufacturer Grendene was exporting to over 48 countries with their own brand Melissa and Grendha. Even though the shoes were known under many names throughout the world, the original French company Jelly Shoes gradually became the term for the "jelly" style of shoe.

As the trend grew globally, so did the amount of brands. Jelly Shoes tried to protect their shoe models and brand but were unsuccesfull. An Italian company started calling their model Tcha-tch creating a legal dispute. The Jelly Shoe company stopped operating in February 1986 but the type of shoe has been reinterpreted by a number of high-end fashion designers in the early twenty-first century. Crocs, for example, are seen by many as a modern take on Jelly sandals.

== Controversy ==
There have been claims about the potential health hazards of PVC for humans and its negative impact on the environment. The industry responded by developing non-toxic and ecological solutions.

== See also ==
- Crocs
- Flip-flops
- List of shoe styles
- Sandals
