= Therme Bad Wörishofen =

German spa complex

Coordinates: 48°01′12″N 10°35′30″E

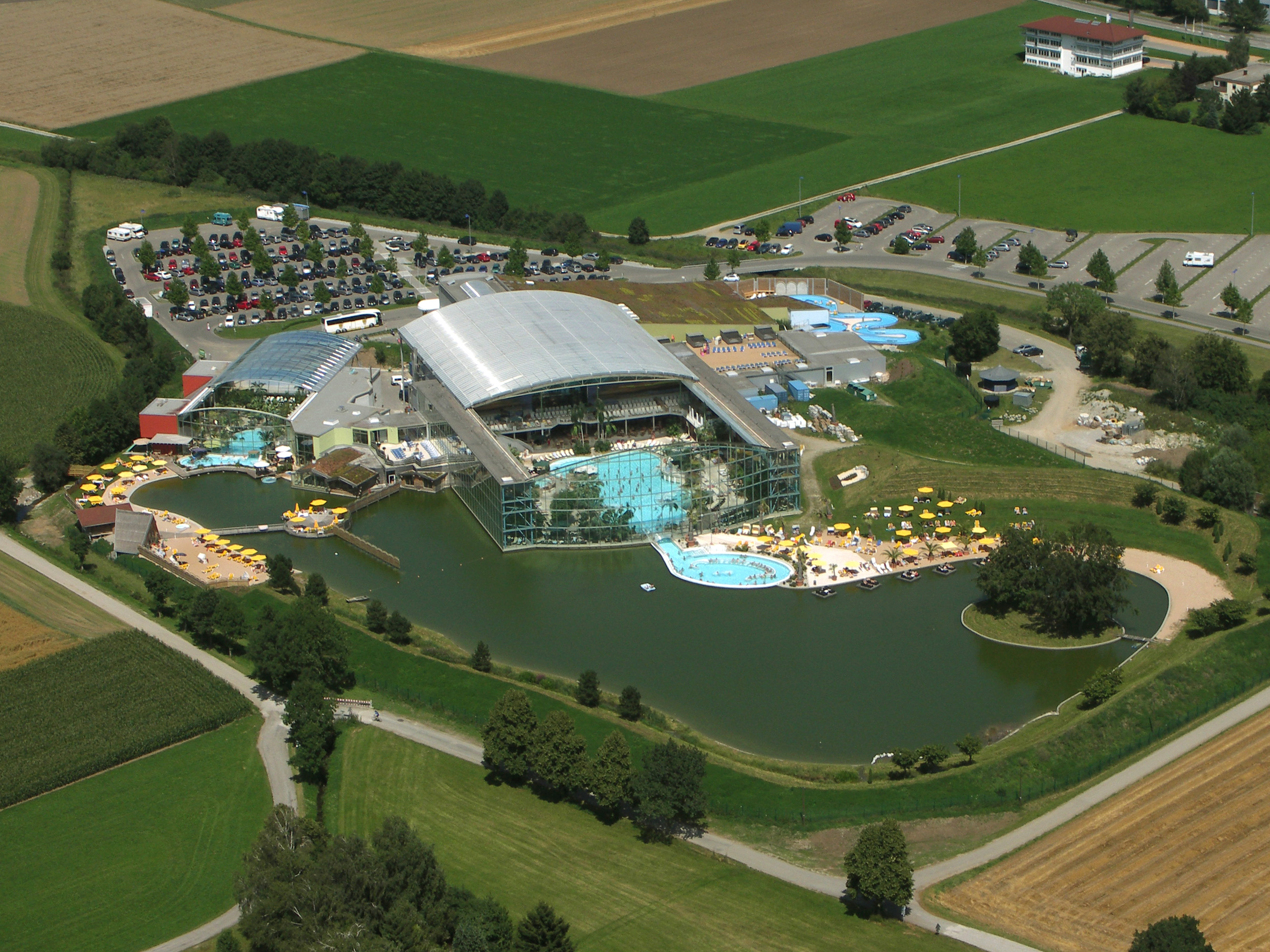
Aerial view

Therme Bad Wörishofen is a spa complex in Bad Wörishofen, Germany (near Munich). It is called Therme despite not having a Roman Bath. The complex is divided into two parts: the Thermenparadies (in English the "Thermae Paradise") and the SaunaOase (in English the "Sauna Oasis"). The Thermenparadies houses the main swimming pools, including jacuzzis and showers. In the SaunaOase there are saunas, showers, swimming pools and a solarium.

It is affiliated with the more famous Therme Erding in the nearby town of Erding, east of Munich Airport.
