= Strappy sandals =

Type of footwear

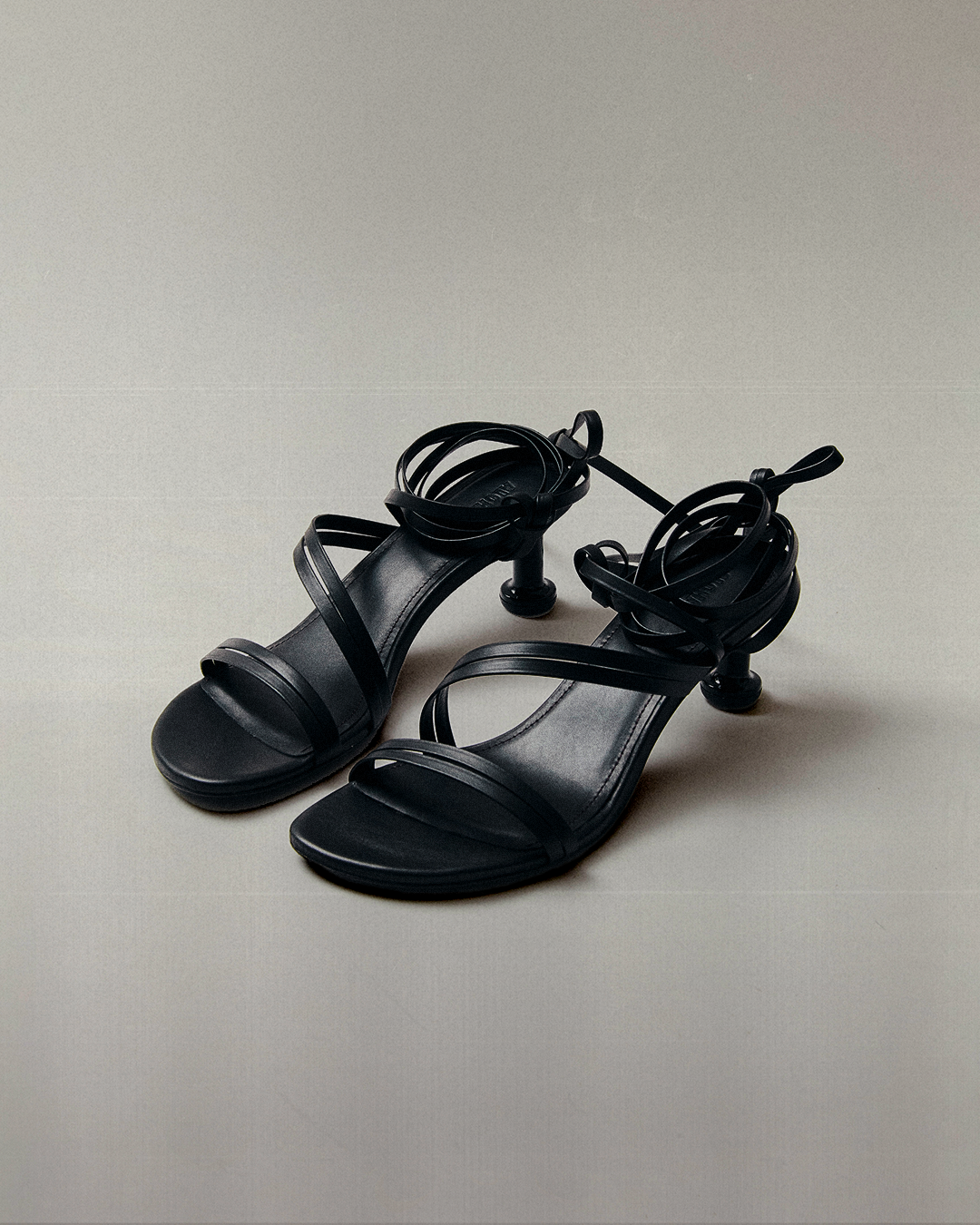
Modern high-heeled strappy sandals

Strappy sandals are sandals with multiple straps that connect (secure) the sole to the foot. Strappy sandals have various designs, materials, and heel heights.

Strappy sandals are popular for summer seasons, having probably adapted gladiator styles popular in 1970s. Harpersbazaar named them the hit of 2024 summer season. Prada and Max Mara are among the brands who actively use strappy sandals in their fashion lines.

Strappy sandals were worn by Kate Moss and Naomi Campbell throughout the 1990s. Sarah Jessica Parker, as Carrie Bradshaw in Sex and the City, wore about 100 pairs of strappy sandals.

== History ==
The origins of strappy sandals date back to ancient civilizations. In Ancient Egypt, sandals made from papyrus and palm leaves featured straps to hold the footwear securely to the feet. These sandals were practical for the hot climate and often indicated social status and wealth.

In Ancient Greece and Rome, sandals were an essential part of everyday attire. Roman soldiers wore these as part of their military uniform.

During the 1920s and 1930s, strappy sandals became popular again. Designers began experimenting with sandal designs, incorporating higher heels and decorative elements.

== Design and materials ==
Strappy sandals are designed with multiple straps that can vary in number, width, and placement. Advancements in material technology have introduced eco-friendly materials like recycled plastics and vegan leathers. The soles can be flat, wedged, or heeled, catering to different comfort levels and style preferences. Among the designs, are gladiator sandals, inspired by ancient Roman footwear and featuring horizontal straps that may extend, and thong sandals, which have a strap between the big toe and the second toe.

== In fashion ==
Famous designers like Manolo Blahnik, Christian Louboutin, and Stuart Weitzman have created popular strappy sandal designs.

== See also ==
- List of shoe styles
