= Herbert Ernst Groh =

Swiss singer (died 1982)

Herbert Ernst Groh (27 May 1905 – 28 July 1982) was a Swiss tenor.

Groh was born in Lucerne and subsequently studied in Zurich and Milan. One of his teachers was Carl Beines, who also taught Richard Tauber.

He began his operatic singing career in Darmstadt in 1926, with engagements following in Frankfurt and Cologne and a successful tour of Italy in 1927, where he also began to make his first recordings using the name of Ernesto Groh. He then started to appear on German radio and devoted himself to developing a career as a recording artist - also making films, but soon giving up the stage - a career that lasted well into the LP era of the 1950s.

He died in 1982 at Norderstedt, near Hamburg.

== Critical appreciation ==
Like Marcel Wittrisch, Groh is inevitably compared to his contemporary Richard Tauber. According to Alan Blyth: "Groh . . . is fonder yet than Tauber of unwritten touches of quite exceptional delicacy, and surpasses his older coeval in sheer technical control."

== Recordings ==
A selection of Groh's recordings were released in 1990 by Pavilion Records on Pearl (GEMM CD 9419).

== Films ==
Year	Film	Role	Notes
1933	Das Lied vom Glück		
1934	Schön ist es verliebt zu sein		
1939	Hochzeitsreise zu dritt		
1940	Casanova heiratet		
1940	Die keusche Geliebte		
1942	So ein Früchtchen		
