= T-bar sandal =

Shoe with a T-shaped strap

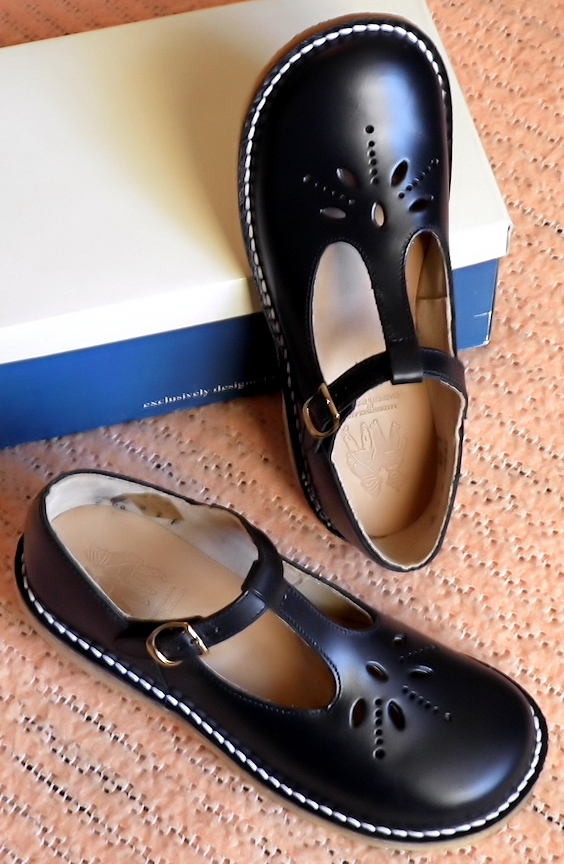
Classic T-bar shoes by Start-rite (known as Sonnet in the United States)

A T-bar sandal or T-bar shoe (also known in the United Kingdom as "school sandal" or "closed-toe sandal") is a closed, low-cut shoe with two or more straps forming one or more T shapes (one or more straps across the instep passing through a perpendicular, central strap that extends from the vamp).

Classic T-bars for children are typically made of blue or brown leather, have two thin straps forming a single T shape and fastened with a buckle, a broad and rounded toe box pierced with a pattern of holes, a low heel, and a crêpe rubber outsole stitched-down to the upper. Among boys, T-bars are traditionally worn with socks (sometimes without), short trousers and a shirt.

== History ==
First seen in Europe and America in the early 1900s, T-bars became very common among children in the 1950s, particularly among boys where they supplanted pre-war Mary Janes. T-bar wearing declined after the 1960s nonetheless, following the cultural and clothing revolution that swept the West.

Nowadays, classic T-bars are generally considered semi-formal shoes, appropriate for school (some primary schools in the United Kingdom require that pupils wear them with their uniform). They may also be viewed as formal shoes, suitable for religious ceremonies, weddings, visits, and birthday parties for example. Having become a harder-to-find, more conservative style of footwear than they used to be, they are also sometimes associated with children of upper-class families. More modern styles are worn in casual settings, however: playgrounds, shopping centres, etc.

Although less popular than in the past, T-bars remain a timeless classic of children's fashion and, for many people, a symbol of childhood.

== Gallery ==
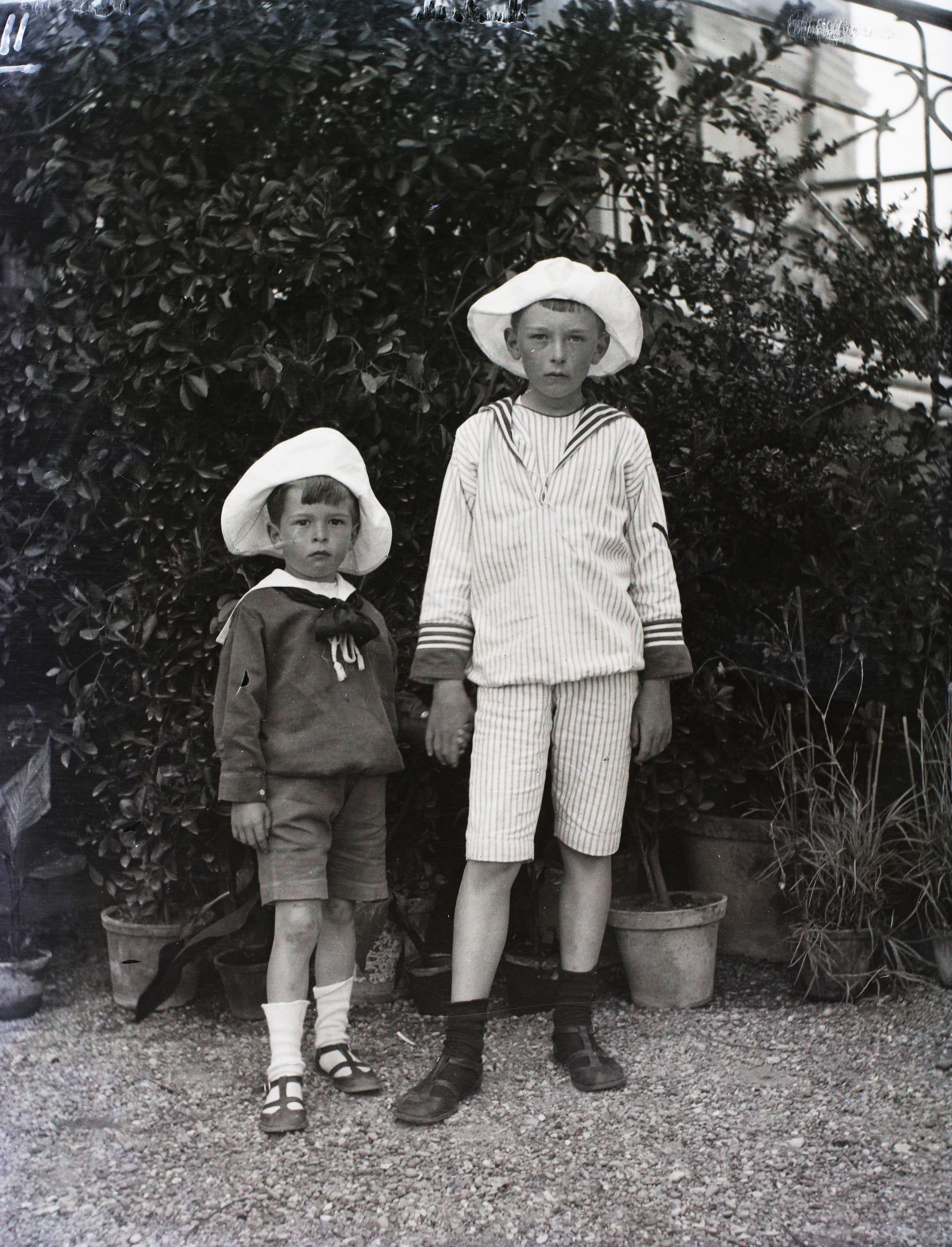
Two boys wearing twin-strap T-bar sandals in Venice, Italy. in 1907.

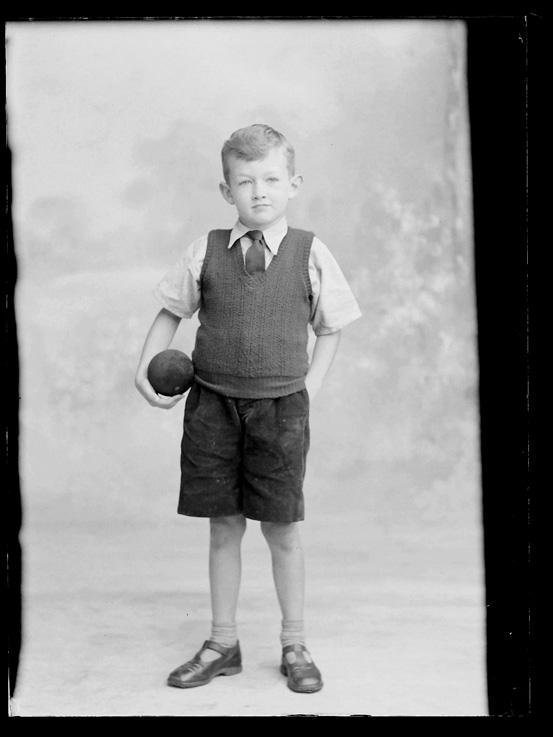
Studio photograph of a seven-year-old boy wearing T-bar sandals in Strabane, Northern Ireland, 1915.

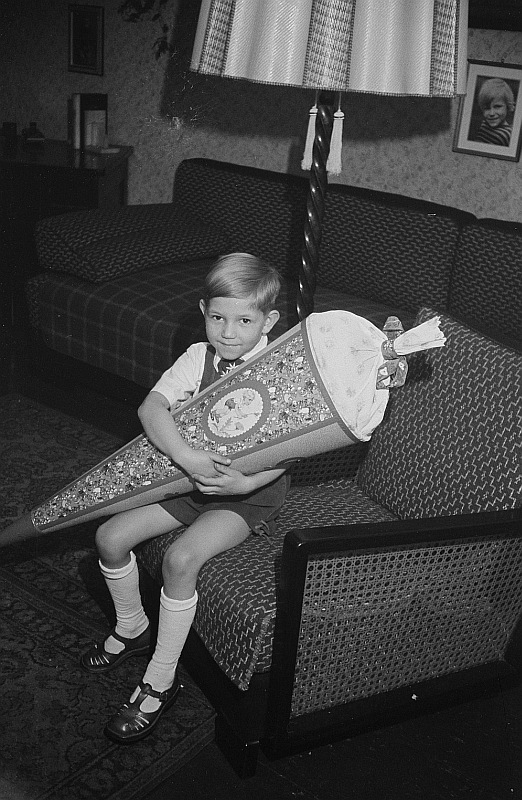
A schoolboy with a Schultüte and wearing T-bar sandals in Leipzig, East Germany, 1951.

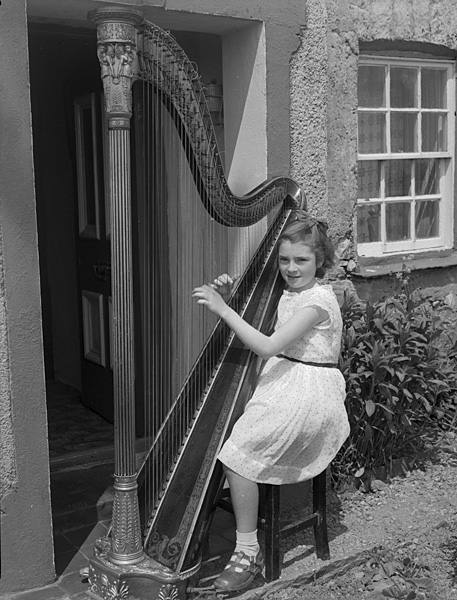
A girl harpist wearing twin-strap T-bar sandals in Wales, 1960.

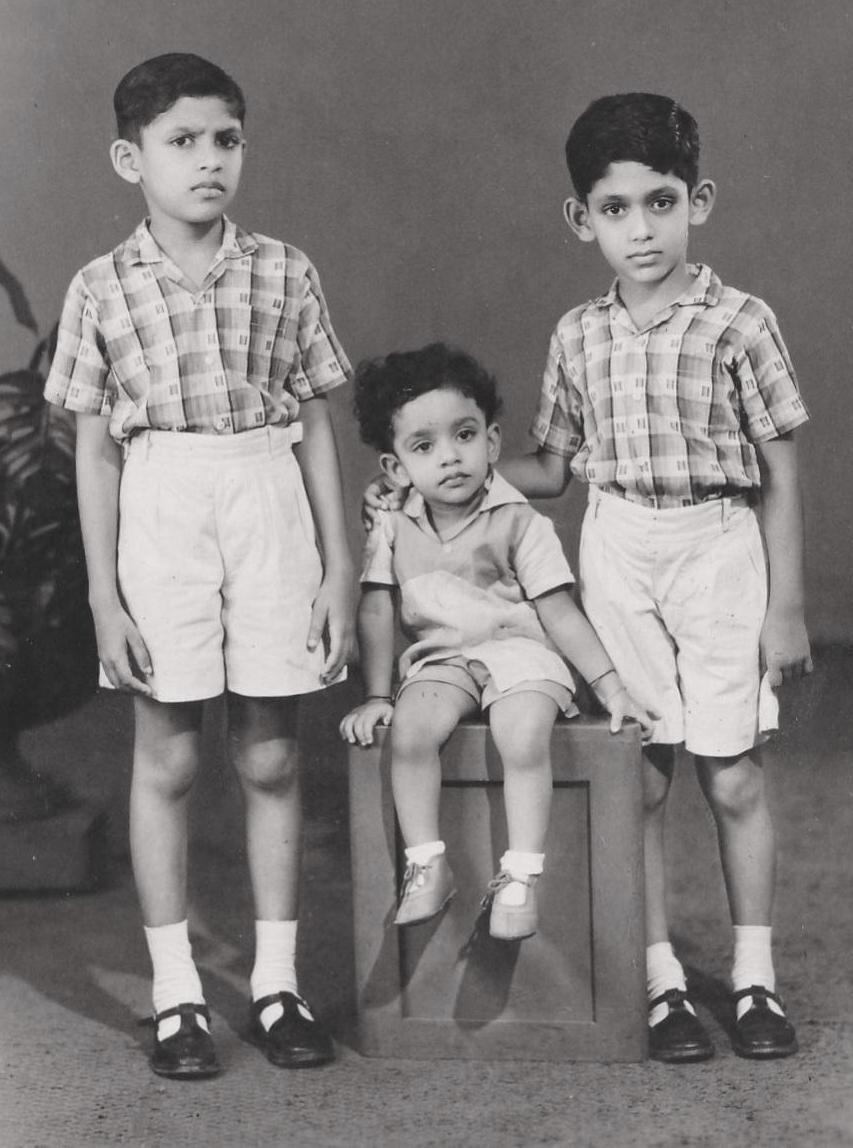
Studio photograph of boys wearing T-bar sandals in Colombo, Sri Lanka, 1964.

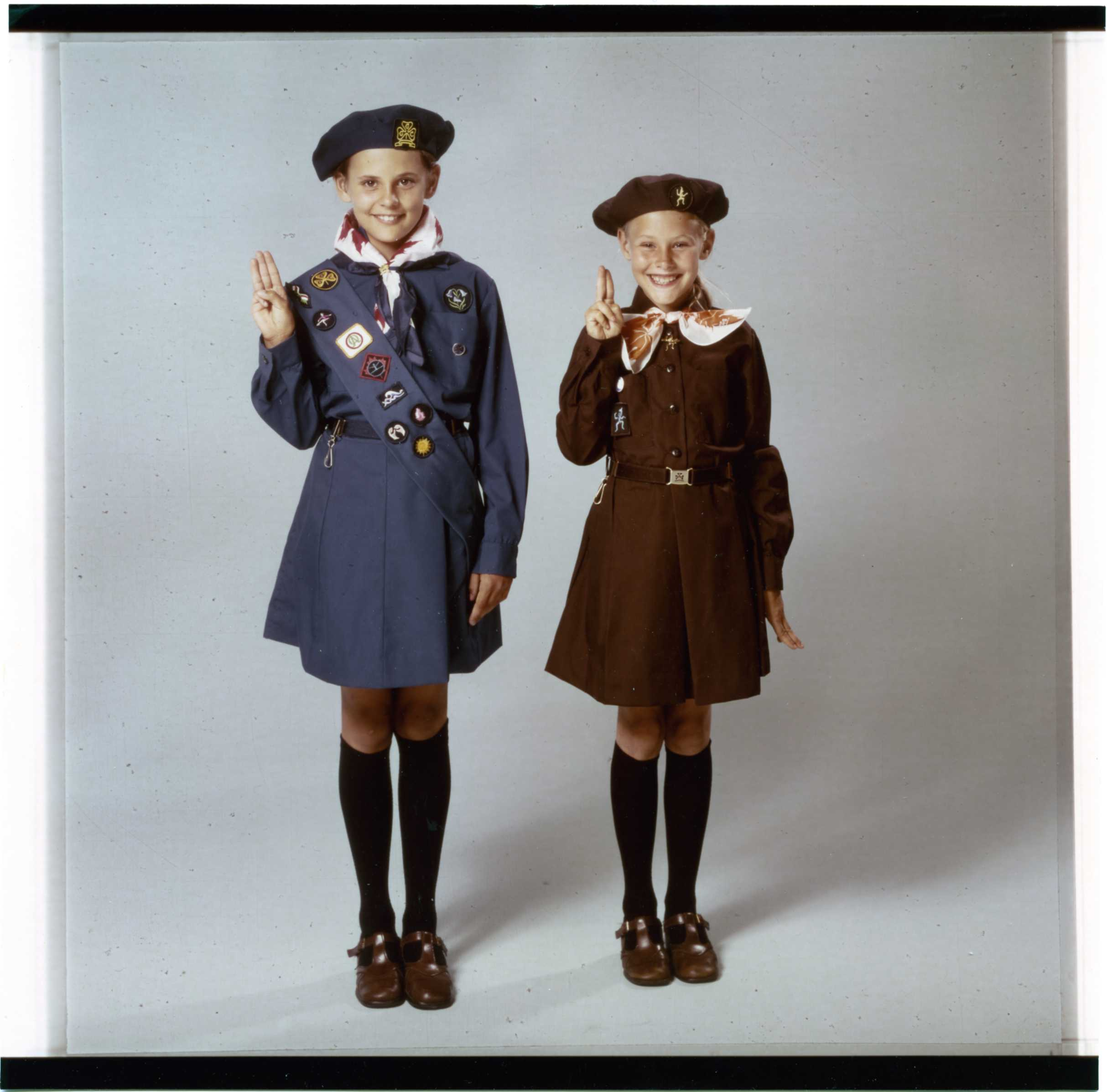
A Girl Guide and a Brownie wearing T-bar sandals in Canada, about 1975.

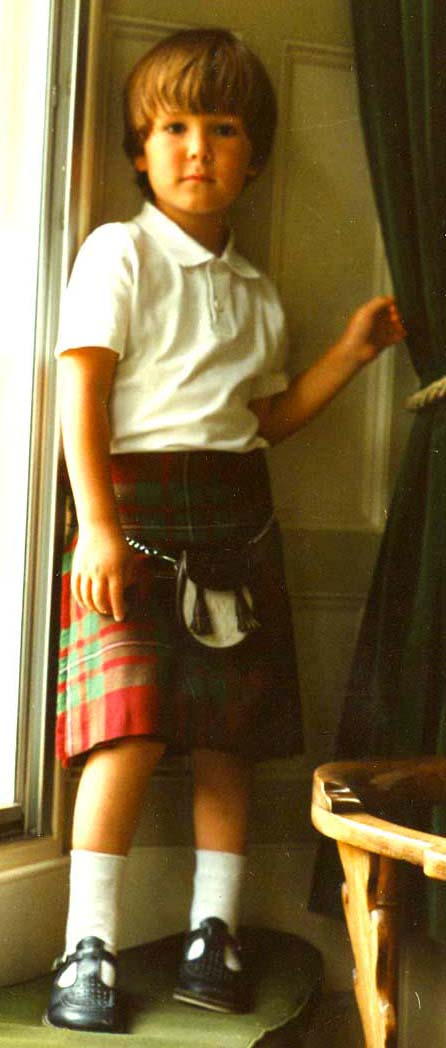
A four-year-old boy wearing a kilt and T-bar sandals in Scotland, 1987.

== See also ==
- List of shoe styles
- Mary Jane (shoe)—a similar style, without the central strap.
