= Start-rite =

Children's shoes manufacturer based in Norwich, England

Start-Rite
- Type: Private Limited company
- Industry: Consumer goods
- Founded: 1792
- Headquarters: Norwich, England,
- Area served: Worldwide
- Key people: James Smith (Founder); Peter Lamble (Chairman)
- Products: Shoes
- Website: startriteshoes.com

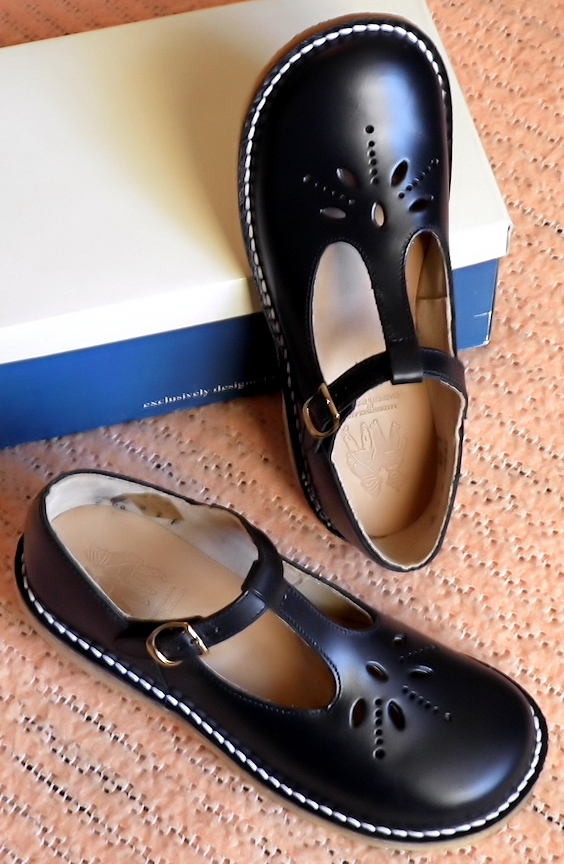
T-bar sandals from Sonnet (Start-Rite Shoes' subsidiary in the United States), dating from approximately 2000.

Start-rite is a brand of children's shoes. The shoemaker, purportedly Britain's oldest and one of the first manufacturers in Norfolk, was established in 1792 in Norwich, England, by James Smith. His grandson, James Southall, gave the firm its current name; it rose in prominence during the 20th century thanks in part to an iconic poster, reading Children's shoes have far to go, which was displayed on the London Underground for 20 years from 1947. Controversy exists around the origins of the image in this poster. It has been attributed to artists Andy Wood, William Grimmond, Joe Wilkinson of Stanley Studios, Susan Pearce, Nancy Gardner and to the company's own advertising agent.

== Royal warrant ==
In 1955 Start-rite was granted a royal warrant by Queen Elizabeth II to supply footwear for the young Prince Charles, Princess Anne, Prince Andrew and Prince Edward. The company was granted a second royal warrant in 1989 by the Prince of Wales to supply children's footwear for Prince William and Prince Harry. This royal warrant was withdrawn in 2003 on production being moved from the UK. In 2016 Prince George was pictured wearing Start-rite shoes in an official portrait taken to commemorate the 90th birthday of the Queen.

In 2003 the company ceased production in the UK, outsourcing its operations to India and Portugal. The cost cutting move came amid a £600,000 annual loss, which the company reversed the following year to turn a £1.5 million profit. Sales further increased by 20% to 2007.

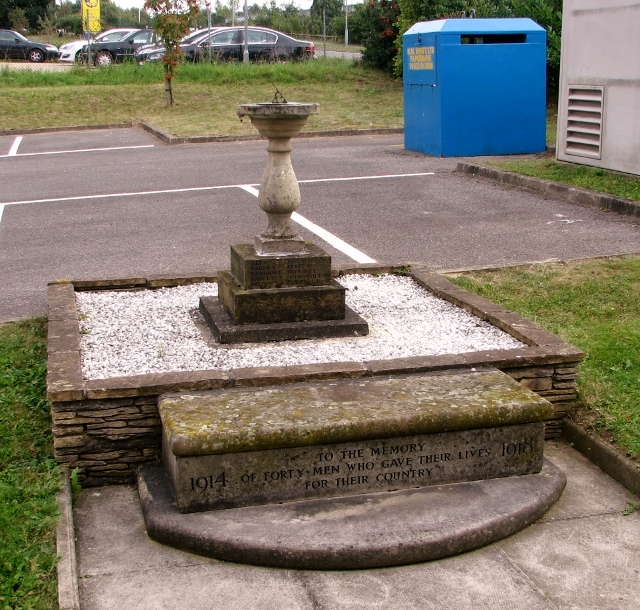
First World War memorial to factory staff

The company focuses on correctly fitting shoes to children's feet, and was the first to introduce variable width fittings for children's shoes. It once maintained concession stores in the now-defunct children's clothing retailer Adams.
