= Sock and buskin =

Ancient symbols of comedy and tragedy

The sock and buskin are ancient symbols of comedy and tragedy. In ancient Greek theatre, actors in tragic roles wore a boot called a buskin (Latin cothurnus) while the actors with comedic roles wore only a thin-soled shoe called a sock (Latin soccus).

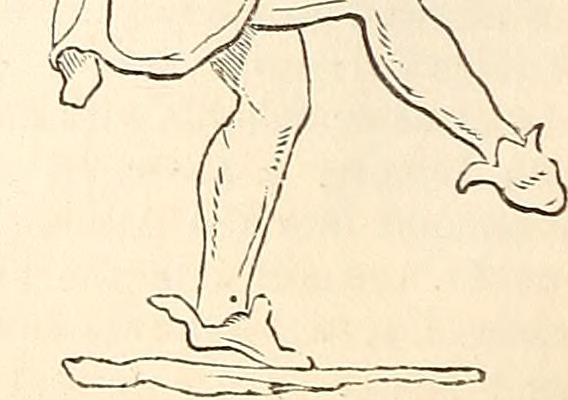
Socks

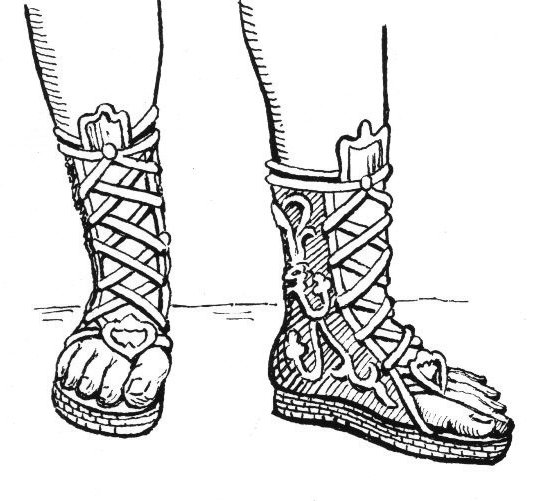
Buskins

The sock and buskin, like the comedy and tragedy masks, are associated with two Greek Muses, Melpomene and Thalia. Melpomene, the Muse of tragedy, is often depicted wearing buskins and holding the mask of tragedy, while Thalia, the Muse of comedy, is often depicted wearing the comic's socks and holding the mask of comedy.
