= Calceus =

Footwear secured by straps worn in Ancient Rome

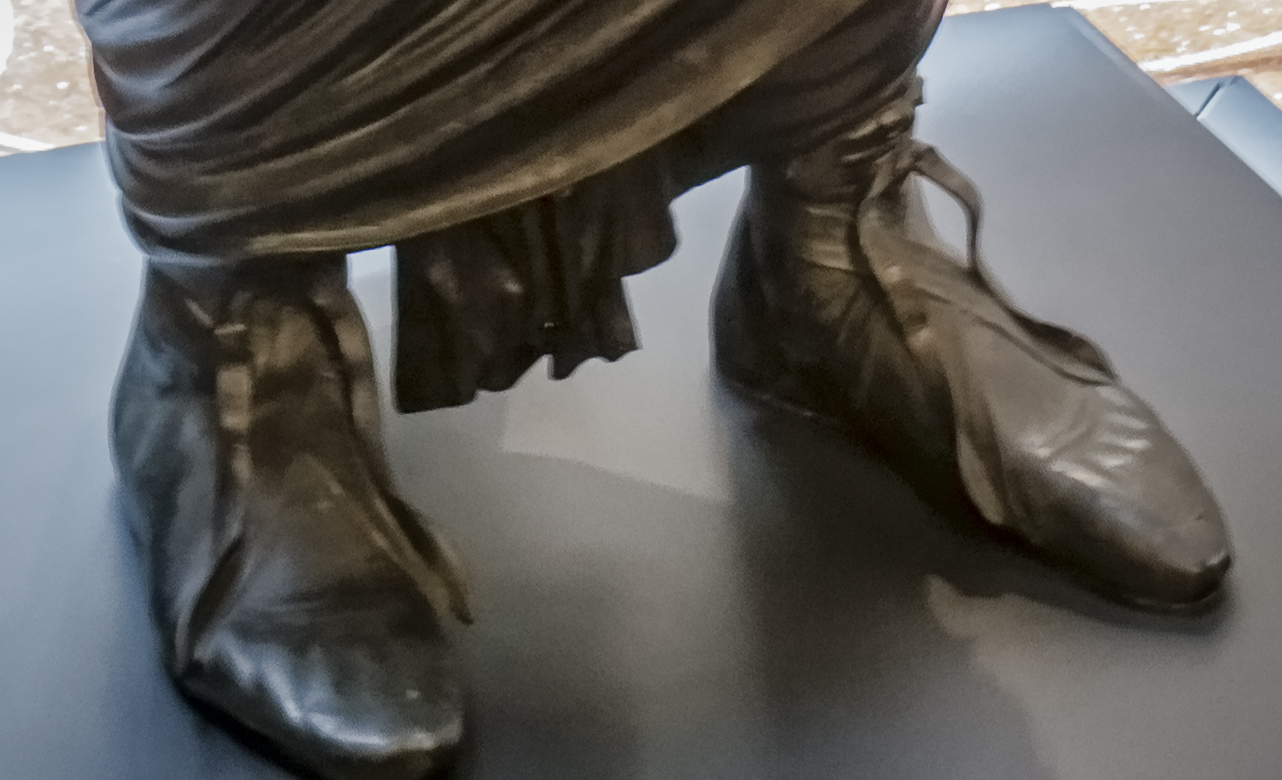
A c. 37 AD statue of the emperor Tiberius recovered from a theater at Herculaneum. Depicted performing a religious ritual with his toga pulled over his head, the emperor is shown wearing the calceus patricius of the patrician class.

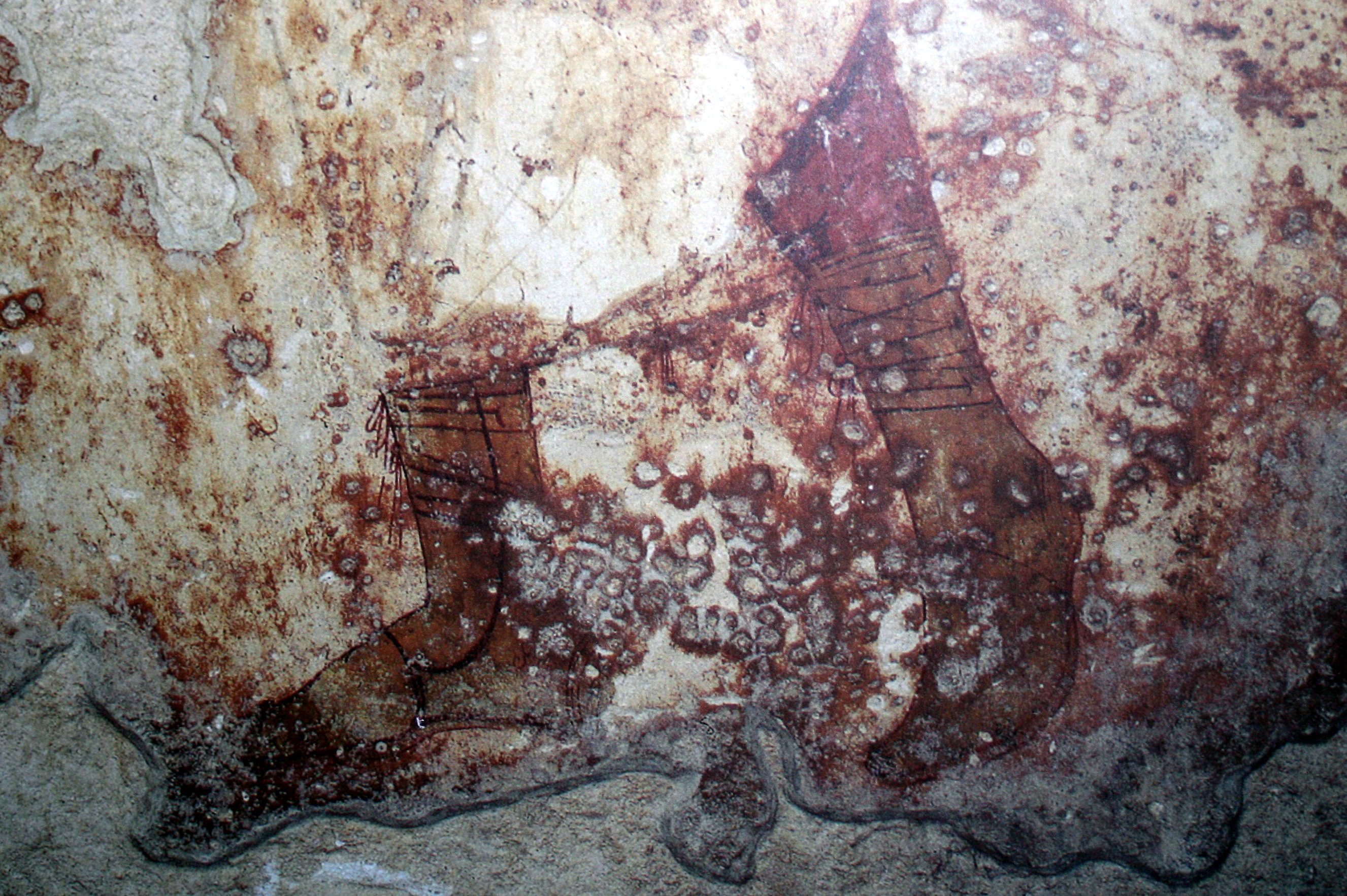
Calcei in a Roman fresco from Paestum, in southern Italy

The calceus (pl.: calcei) was the common upper-class male footwear of the Roman Republic and Empire. Normally made of leather and hobnailed, it was flat soled and typically reached the lower shin, entirely covering the foot and ankle. It was secured with crossed thongs or laces. Equivalent to a short boot or high-top shoe, it was lighter than the military caliga but sturdier than slip-on shoes like the soccus and able to easily handle outdoor use.

== Name ==
The Latin word calceus derives from calx ("heel") and the usually Grecian suffix -eus, meaning essentially "heely" or "thing for the heel". It is frequently taken loosely as the general Latin word for any laced and covered shoe distinguished from sandals, slippers, and boots. Theodor Mommsen even considered it to sometimes intend sandals as well. Similarly, medieval Latin used the adjective discalceātus to indicate both mendicant orders which only used sandals and those which went entirely barefoot.

== Design ==
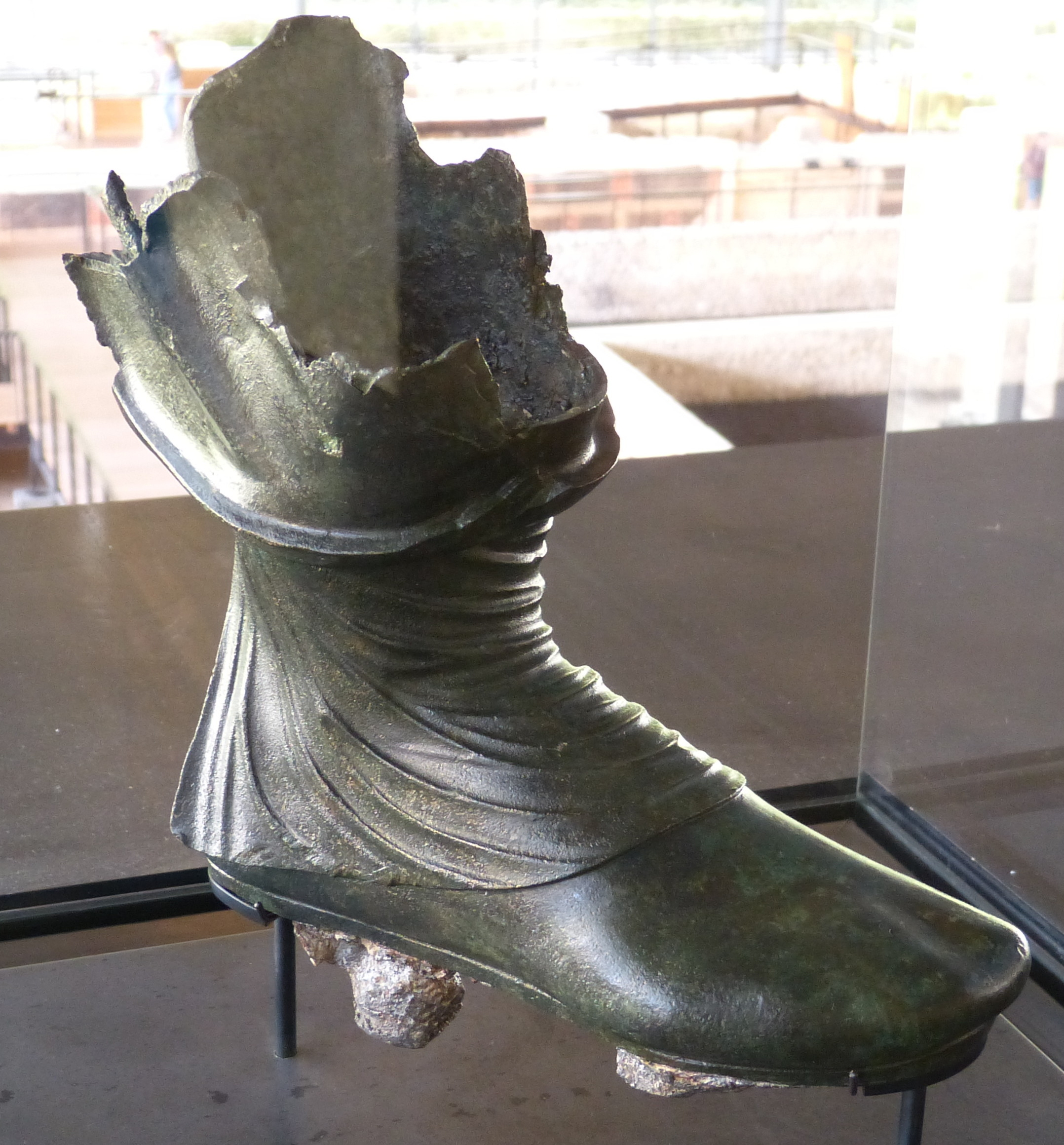
A bronze calceus at the Vesunna Gallo-Roman Museum

Normally made of leather and hobnailed, the calceus was flat soled and typically reached the lower shin, entirely covering the foot and ankle. It was secured with crossed thongs or laces. Equivalent to a short boot or high-top shoe, it was lighter than the military caliga but sturdier than slip-on shoes like the soccus and able to easily handle outdoor use.

Calcei were considered a distinctive part of the national dress of male Roman citizens, alongside the toga. The combination of toga and calcei was impressive, but also hot and uncomfortable. The Roman poet Martial claimed that, in their leisure time and in the more relaxed surroundings of rural life, hardly anyone used it by the early imperial period. Even in Rome, some high-ranking citizens preferred to wear light Grecian sandals or socci rather than calcei to "go with the crowd".

== Types ==
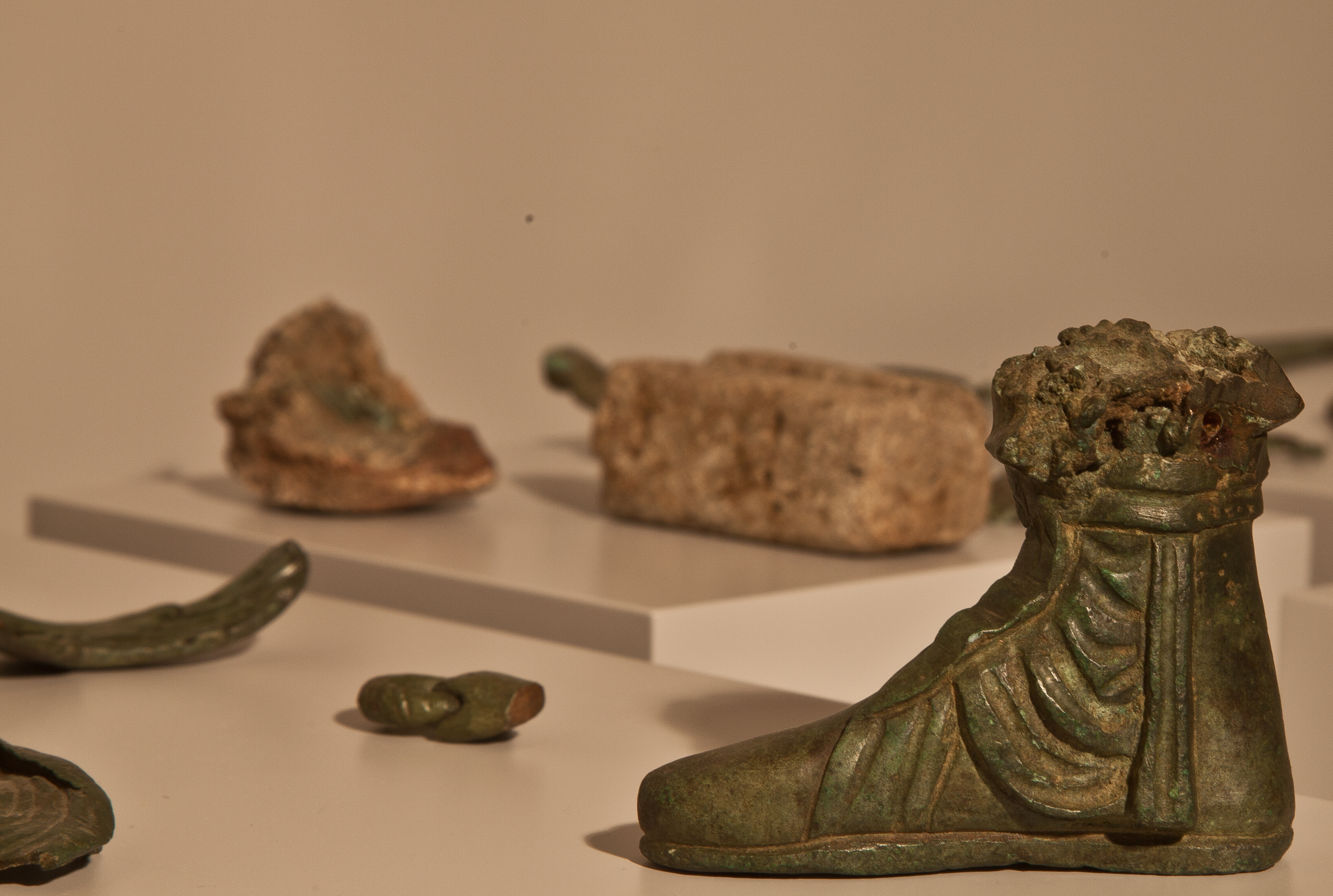
A bronze senatorial calceus discovered in Spain

The calcei of most plebs were made of undyed but tanned leather. (The version made with untanned rawhide instead was known as the pero.) The "patrician calceus" (calceus patricius) seems to have often been dyed red, Tyrian purple, or some equivalent. Senators and higher ranking priests were likewise expected to wear the mulleus or "red calceus" (calceus mulleus) along with their red-edged toga praetexta while engaged in their public duties. Festus claimed the mulleus was originally used by the kings of Alba Longa before being adopted by the patricians. Cassius Dio states that the patrician shoes were originally marked with the letter R, although early forms of Latin used an R closer in shape to the later P. Francis X. Ryan has offered that this class distinction in footwear—rather than procedural status—may have been responsible for the name of the backbencher senatores pedarii. Cato the Elder stated that, by the end of the Republic, plebs who had reached curule office were entitled to the formerly patrician footwear. Plebeian generals like Marius who celebrated a triumph were likewise permitted to wear them. Talbert states that by the imperial era there is no conclusive evidence that footwear continued to differ between the classes as a whole, possibly because the emperors began to restrict the use of certain status symbols to themselves.

Other calcei were distinguished by their ornamentation. The "equestrian calceus" (calceus equestris or equester) included distinct crescent-shaped buckles. The "senatorial calceus" (calceus senatorius) was likewise distinguished by a crescent-shaped ornament, an ivory lunula attached to the back of the shoe. By the mid-imperial period, this was probably made of black leather.

The "turned calceus" (New Latin calceus repandus) was an unrelated pointy-toed unisex Etruscan form of footwear, which receives its name from a passage in Cicero where he references Juno Sospita's calceoli repandi, "pointed slippers".

== See also ==
- List of shoe styles
- Clothing in ancient Rome
- Soccus, Solea, and Caligae
- Discalced
