= Ammunition boot =

Footwear for the British Army

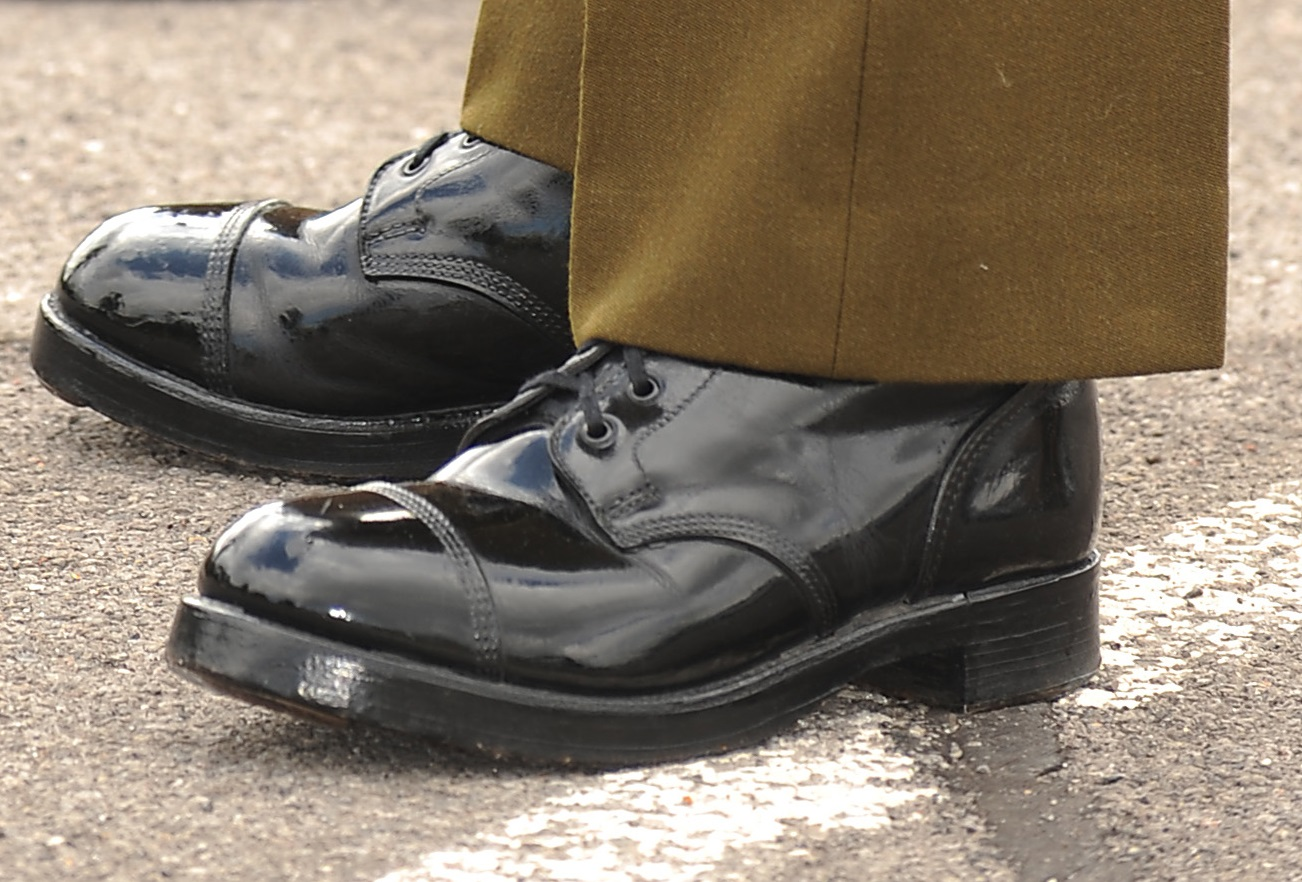
Soldier of the British Army's Army Air Corps wearing Boots, Ankle, General Service ("ammo boots") as part of ceremonial No 2 Dress in 2011. Note the bulled polish.

Ammunition boots are a family of military footwear originating from the United Kingdom. They were the standard combat boot for the British Army and other affiliated forces around the British Empire and Commonwealth from at least the mid-1860s (Note: The term “Ammunition Boot” has been used since at least 1864.) until their replacement a century later in the 1960s with the Boot, Direct Moulded Sole, essentially Ammunition boots with direct moulded soles which were ultimately replaced by the Boot, Combat High in the mid-1980s.

They replaced the earlier ankle boots that had been in service since the early 1800s. Ammunition boots (now known as Boots, Ankle, General Service) and their DMS counterparts remain in use today by British and Commonwealth armies for ceremonial public duties, most notably by the British Army's Household Division, who provide the King's Guard.

== Etymology ==
The term "ammunition boots" is a generic term for these heavy, studded ankle boots, which were produced in a variety of patterns. The name supposedly comes from the boots' being historically procured by the Master Gunner and the Munitions Board at Woolwich (the Regiment of Artillery's headquarters) rather than Horse Guards (the headquarters of the British Army), and being of "ammunition quality".

== History ==
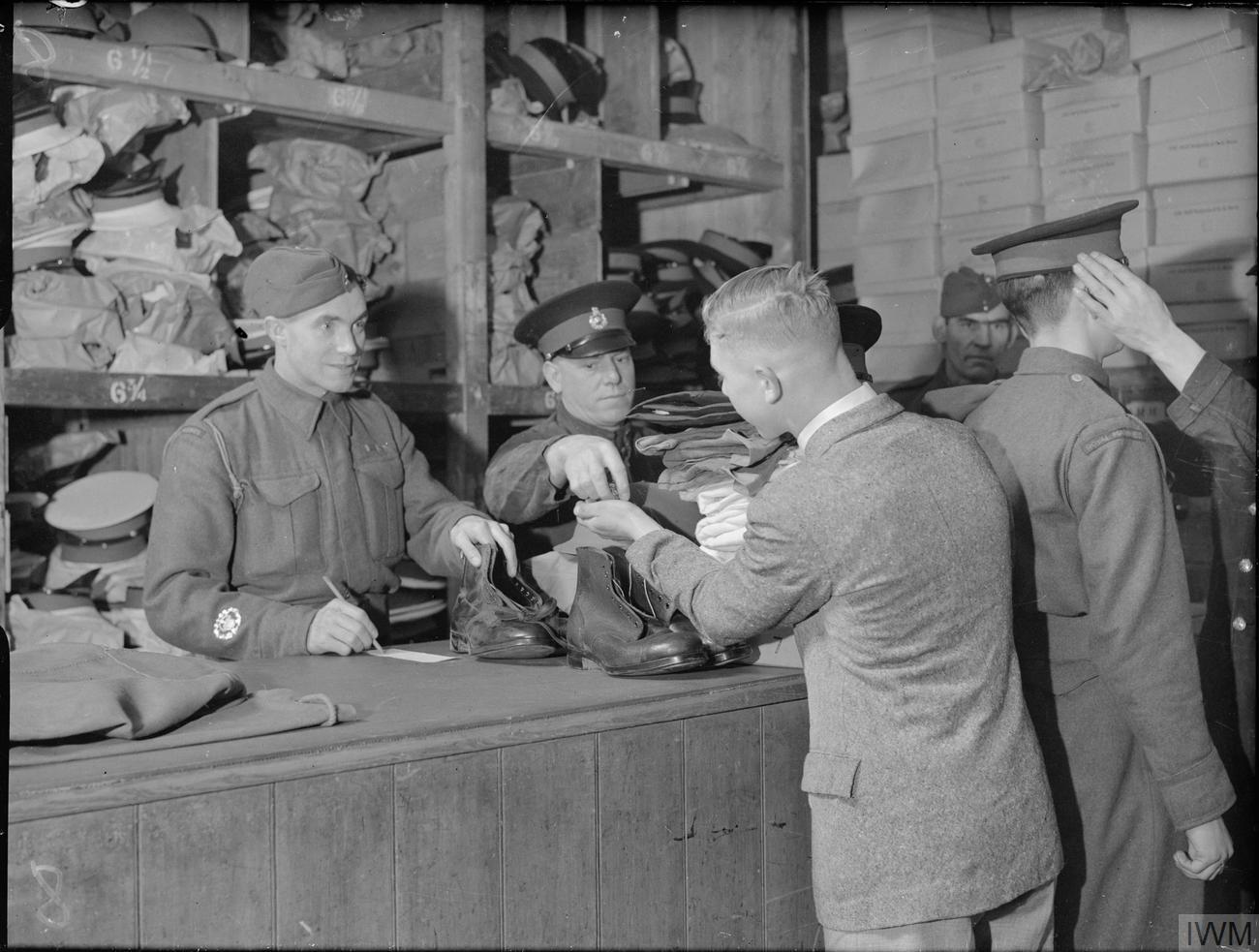
A Royal Marine being issued ammunition boots during the Second World War

Ammunition boots were unlined ankle-boots, usually with leather laces, iron heel-plate and toe-plate, and an iron-studded leather sole. The vamp (front) and quarters (sides) were often made of a contrasting type of leather than the toe case (toe cap) and counter (heel cap), one made of "pebble-grained" (dimpled) leather and the other of smooth leather. They were designed to be hard-wearing and long-lasting rather than comfortable. The hobnail-studded soles made a loud crunching sound when the wearer was marching, earning them the nickname "crunchies".

Prior to the First World War, British soldiers were issued two pairs of boots, both made with a brown finish that had to be polished black. There was a brief period (1908 to 1914) where they were issued one pair that was hand-polished in black for parade and drill, and one pair finished in raw brown hide for fatigue duty and field service. The First World War forced the reversion to brown leather boots for Other Ranks, and a simplification of the patterns, but polished black boots were still worn by some individuals or units out of habit. Officers, who purchased their own uniforms, were still required to wear polished brown boots and matching leather Sam Browne belt with their field service uniform, marking them apart from their men. Officers' boots had heel plates, but lacked the sole studs and toe plates because they could afford to have the soles replaced. The later Boots, General Service adopted in 1927 were issued from the factory in black leather.

== Patterns ==
The original Pattern 1037 was made from 1887 to 1907. During the Second Boer War (1899–1902), civilian manufacturers made a series of variants on the Pattern 1037 due to differing manufacturing techniques (like machine-sewn uppers or glued-on outer soles).

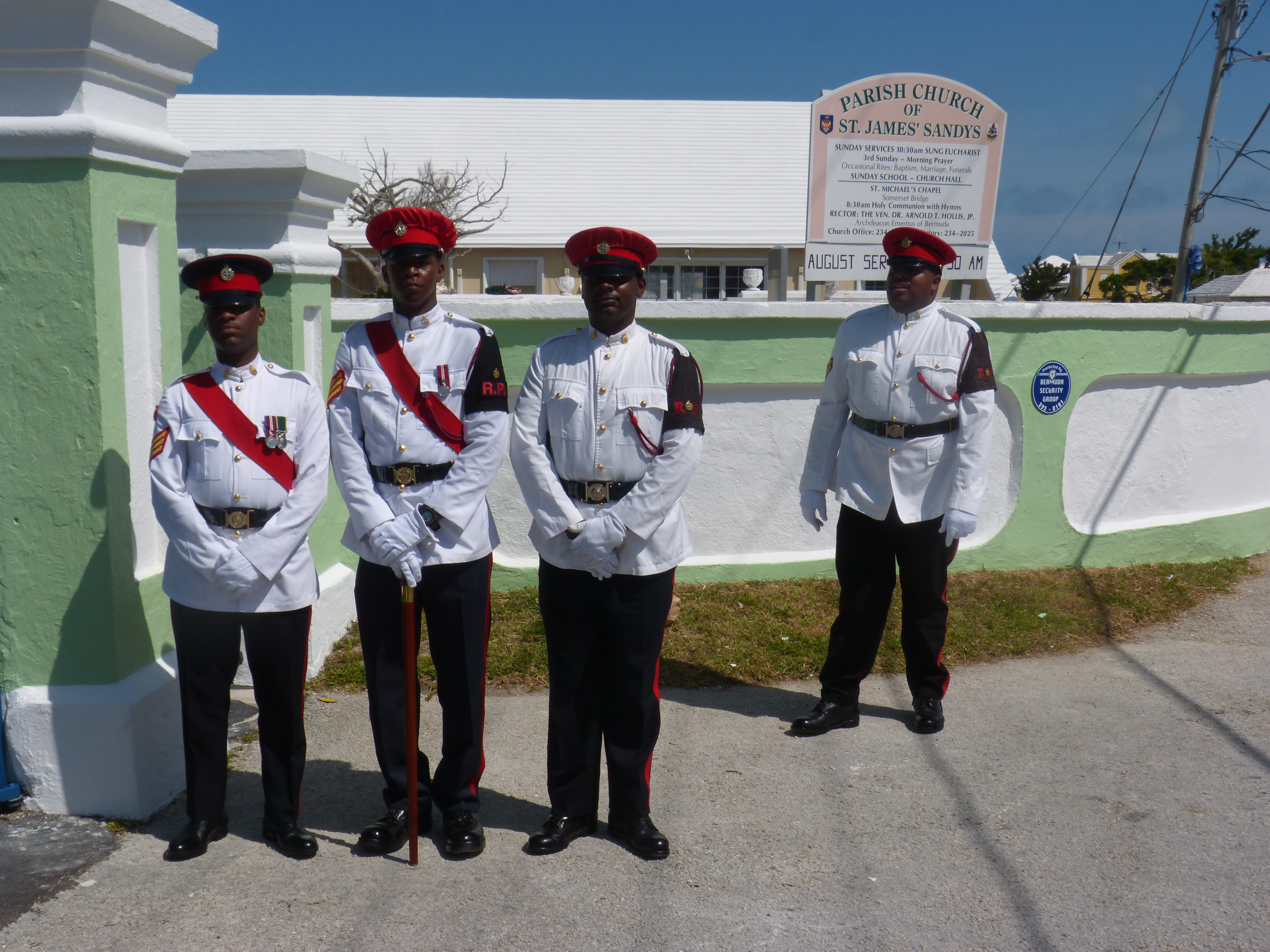
Royal Bermuda Regiment soldiers in No.3 dress and ammunition boots.

An improved 1037i pattern was adopted from 1907 to 1911. It was temporarily replaced by the similar 7325 and 7326 patterns from 1911 to 1914 while they did research for a replacement boot. The experimental "A" and "HN" series were also made during this time but were obsolete by the dawn of the First World War.

By 1915, the "B" series was begun, consisting chiefly of the "B2" and "B5". It was a pattern of ammunition boot with woven cotton laces, a plain-leather counter, and lacked the leather toe cap. It was created to save leather and increase production. To reinforce the boot and increase wear the B2 series had a horizontal seam between the parts of the upper and the "B5" series had rivets between the vamp and quarters.

In 1918, the post-war 9902 pattern came into service. It had a "clump sole" (one-piece sole and heel), smooth leather vamp and quarters, and pebbled-leather counter and toe-cap. It came in brown leather, but was polished black.

In 1924, the Pattern 4055 boot, forerunner of the Boot, General Service (BGS) was issued. It came in brown leather and had 25 hobnails. In 1927, the later Pattern 10085 boot, the BGS, was similar except it came in black leather.

=== Variant patterns ===
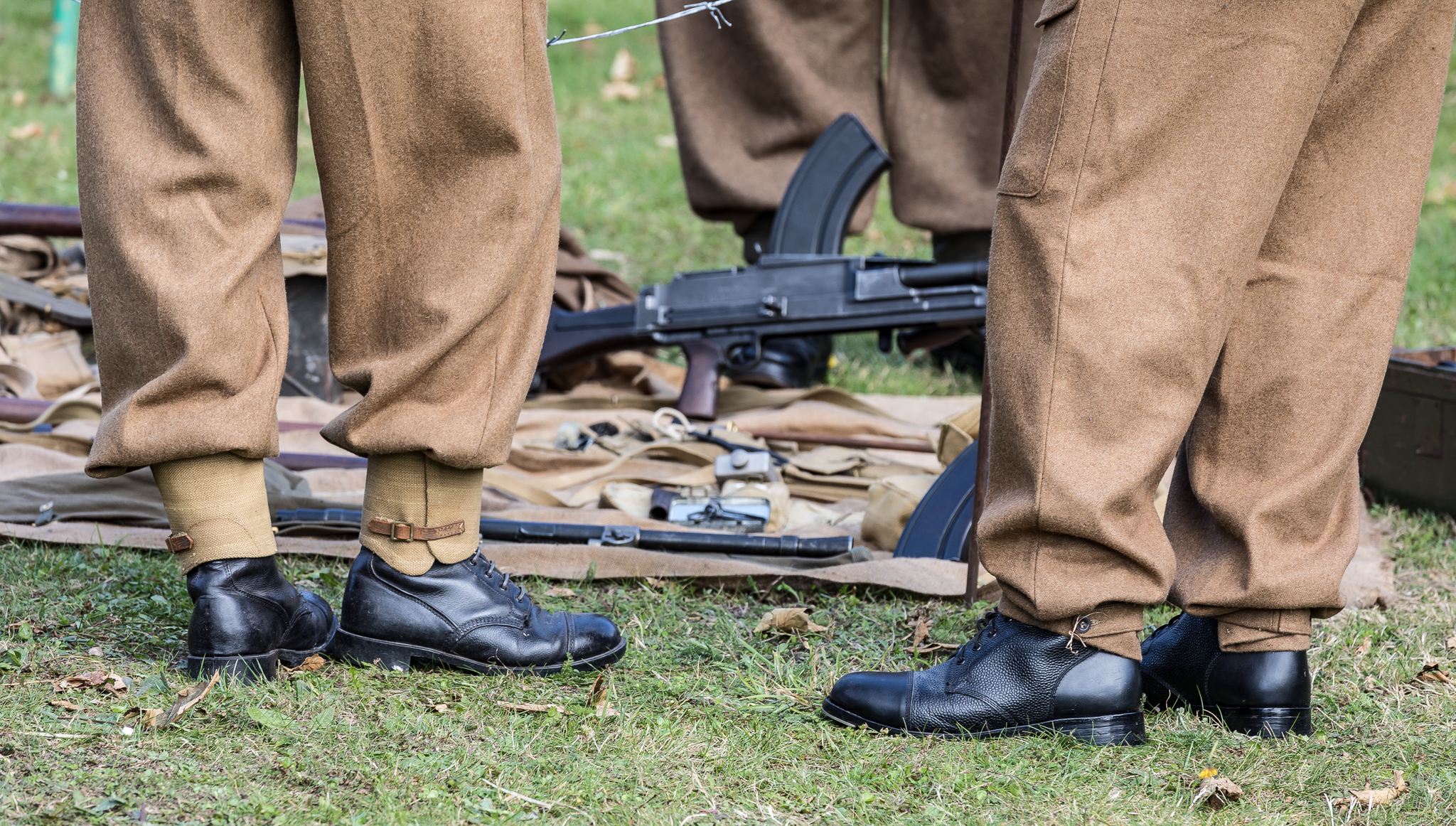
Ammunition boots worn by Second World War reenactors

Vehicle drivers wore boots without hobnails because they would damage the pedals and create sparks. This was extended to armoured vehicle crews in the Royal Tank Regiment and Reconnaissance Corps in 1942, as well as to the crews of waterborne craft of the Royal Army Service Corps in 1943.

Specialists and ammunition storemen were issued regular ammunition boots with rubber heels and rubber crepe soles that lacked the hobnails and steel heel- and toe-plates. This was to avoid creating sparks near flammable or explosive stores (like gunpowder or gasoline). Commandos were issued them to make it easier for them to move silently.

During the Second World War, a pattern without the toecap was used by the Canadian Army and was issued to the Royal Air Force and the Royal Marines. As an economy measure the number of hobnails were reduced in April 1942 to 15 hobnails, later reduced to 13 hobnails in September 1942.

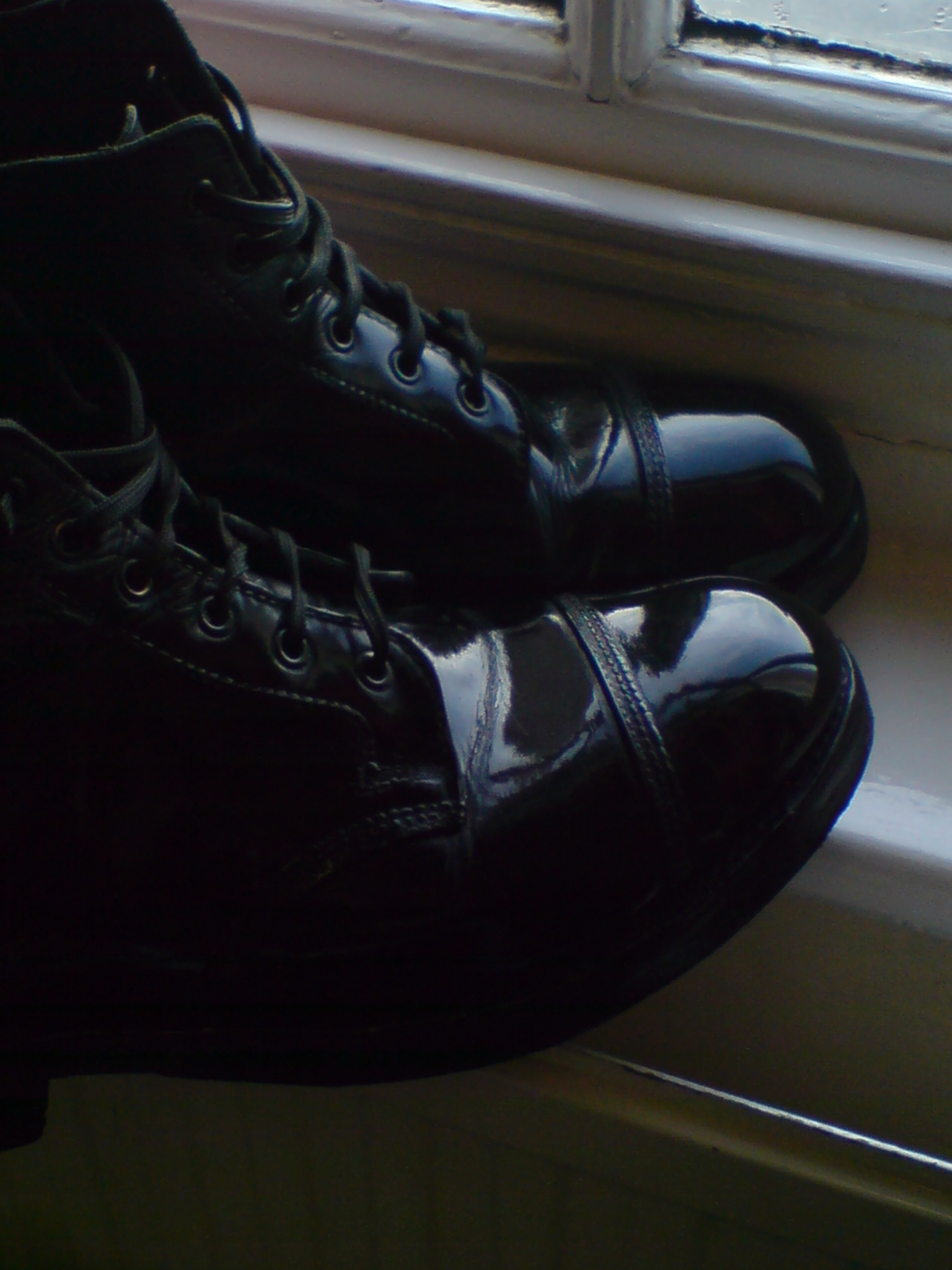
Ammunitions boots are often bulled using shoe polish and beeswax

The boots were the focus of much drill and attention. Achieving a high polish was often the aim and required hours of "bulling" (vigorous polishing) until it achieved a mirror like shine. Experienced soldiers would "burn-down" the dimpled surface of the boots with beeswax and a heated spoon to make them smooth and easier to shine.

Beginning in 1958, the Ammunition Boot was gradually phased out by the Boot, Direct Moulded Sole, which was essentially the same boot with a direct moulded sole and a slightly different stitching pattern. It served the British Army until the 1980s, when it was replaced by the Boot, Combat High. The DMS boots were derided by British soldiers, who found the boot to be uncomfortable for long periods of wear, insufficiently insulated and prone to severe waterlogging, which would cause severe cases of trench foot in wet environments. This problem was most exemplified during the Falklands War, where British soldiers were alleged to have looted dead Argentinean soldiers for their high-leg boots.

== See also ==
- List of shoe styles
