= Spartoo UK =

UK online retailer

Spartoo.co.uk
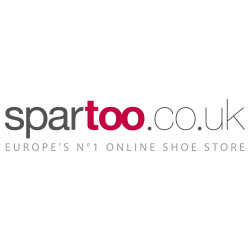
- Industry: Online retail
- Founded: 2009
- Headquarters: Grenoble, France
- Key people: Boris Saragaglia; Jérémie Touchard; Paul Lorne
- Products: Shoes, clothing, bags and accessories for men, women and children
- Number of employees: 200+
- Parent: Spartoo.com
- Website: spartoo.com

Spartoo.co.uk is an e-commerce website specialising in shoes and clothing created in 2009 as part of the company Spartoo.com, created in 2006 and based in Grenoble, France. The name of the company was inspired by the gladiator sandal or "spartiate" from the town of Sparte, a major power in ancient Greece. Spartoo was modelled after the American company Zappos, an online shoe retailer. Spartoo is now present in 30 European countries. They sell primarily footwear, but also carry ready-to-wear fashion for men and women.

== Expansion in Europe ==
- 2006 : Spartoo.com launches with 1.2 million euros in investments
- 2007 : 4.3 million euros in investments gained for expansion
- 2009 : Launch of Spartoo.co.uk, and Spartoo is named one of the fastest-growing companies in Europe by Media Momentum
- 2010 : Spartoo.com raises 12.3 million euros in investments for expansion in Europe, acquires the retail website Sacby.com, creates the luxury retail website Le-Temple.com, and buys the retail website Shoes.fr.
- 2010 : Launch of Spartoo.es and Spartoo.de
- 2011 : Spartoo.com buys the English retail shoe website Rubbersole.co.uk, and launches Spartoo in 20 countries including: Netherlands, Finland, Belgium, Poland, Sweden, Portugal, Greece, and Denmark
- 2012 : Spartoo raises more investment funds, and is judged one of the fastest-growing companies in Europe at the Media Momentum awards
- 2013 : Spartoo launches a clothing line, Spartoo.co.uk opens a warehouse in the UK, and launches a local television ad

== Turnover ==
- 2012 : 150 million euros
- 2011 : 100 million euros
- 2010 : 50 million euros
- 2009 : 30 million euros
- 2008 : 15 million euros
- 2007 : 5 million euros
