= Comedy and tragedy masks =

Pair of masks representing the performing arts

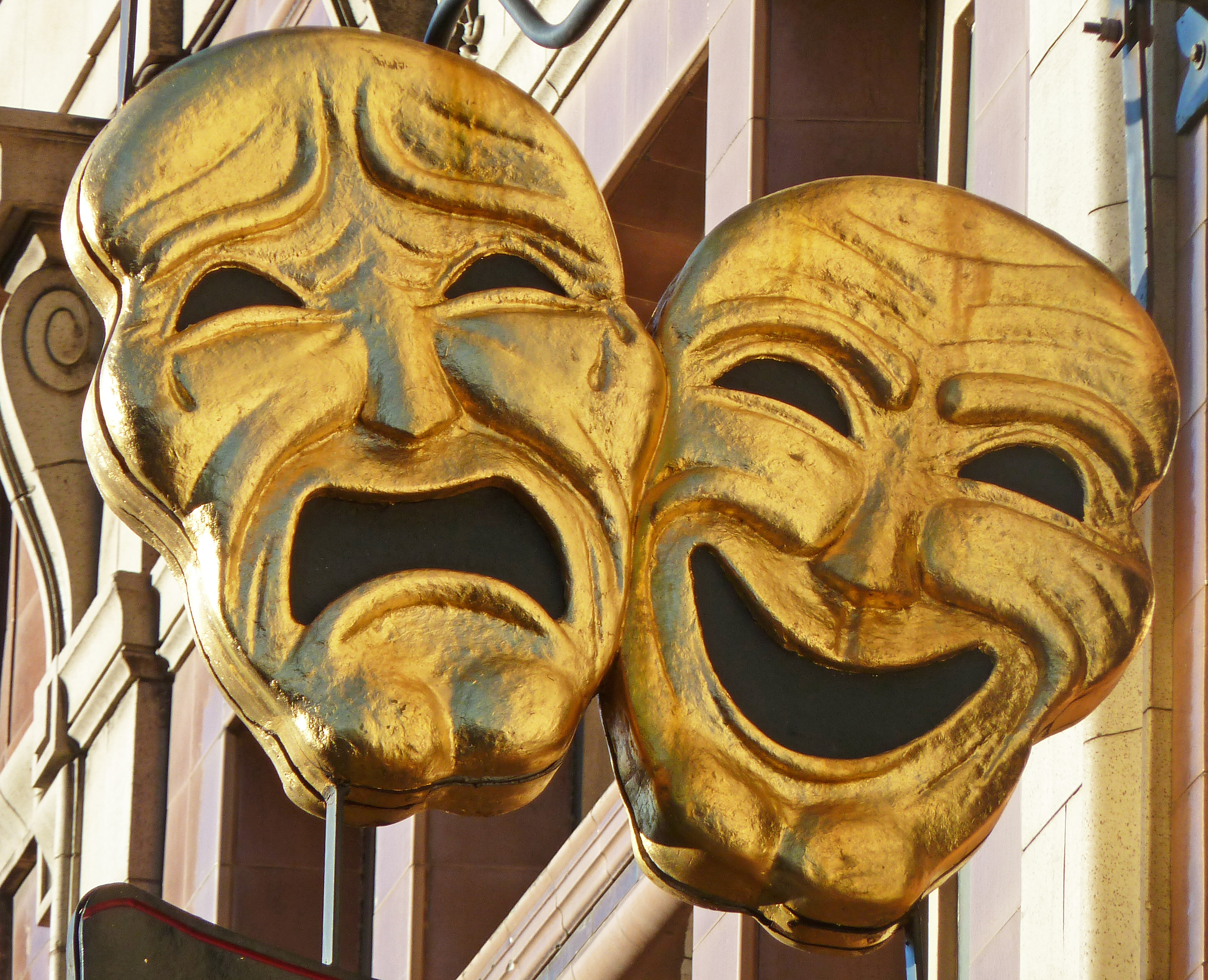
A typical representation of the comedy and tragedy masks

The comedy and tragedy masks, also known as the drama masks, are a pair of masks, one crying and one laughing, that have widely come to represent the performing arts. Originating in the theatre of ancient Greece, the masks were said to help audience members far from the stage to understand what emotions the characters were feeling.

The crying mask is often ascribed the name Melpomene, after the Muse of tragedy, sometimes abbreviated as Melpo, while the laughing mask is named for Thalia, the Muse of comedy, with the Muses often depicted holding their respective masks. Melpomene and Thalia were daughters of Zeus. Melpomene means a celebration of dance and song, while Thalia comes from the Greek thallein meaning to flourish or be verdant.

The masks have also sometimes been associated with the Greek god Dionysus (the god of theatre) and the Roman god Janus (a god with two faces).

== History ==
The masks originate in ancient Greek theatre where masks were worn in order to make it easier for the audience to better see the emotions characters had. They also helped differentiate between characters in a time where all actors were male. Over time the masks have come to be more symbolical towards theatre and less practical.

== See also ==
- Sock and buskin, ancient symbols of comedy and tragedy
