= Melpomene =

Muse of tragedy in Greek mythology

- Goddess of Tragedy and Chorus
- Member of the Muses
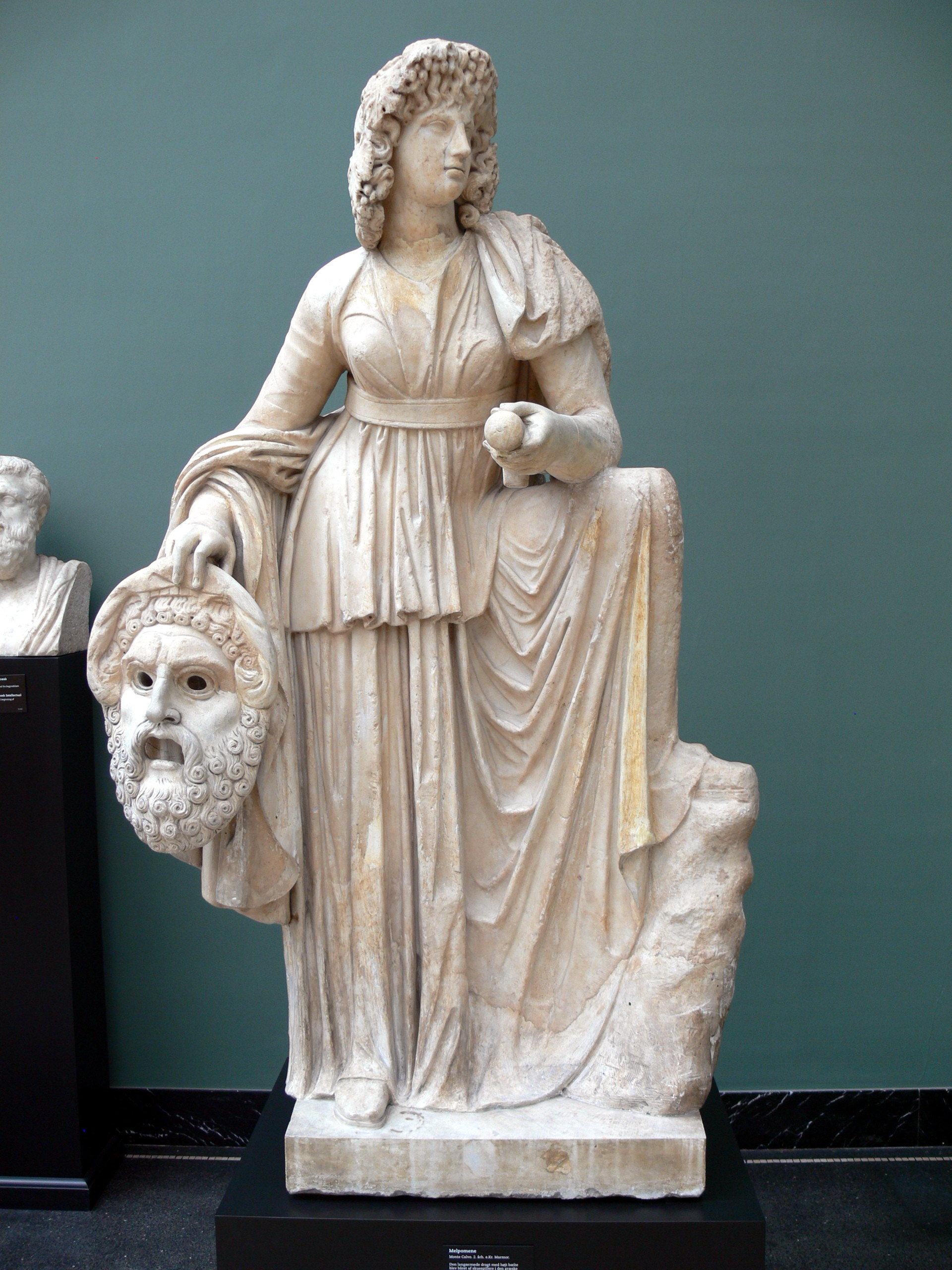
- Roman statue of Melpomene, 2nd century AD. The muse is shown in a long-sleeved garment with a high belt, clothing that was associated with tragic actors. Her wreath of vines and grapes alludes to Dionysus, the god of the theatre
- Abode: Mount Olympus
- Symbols: Tragic mask

Genealogy
- Parents: Zeus and Mnemosyne
- Siblings: Euterpe, Polyhymnia, Urania, Clio, Erato, Thalia, Terpsichore, Calliope and several paternal half-siblings
- Consort: Achelous
- Children: the Sirens

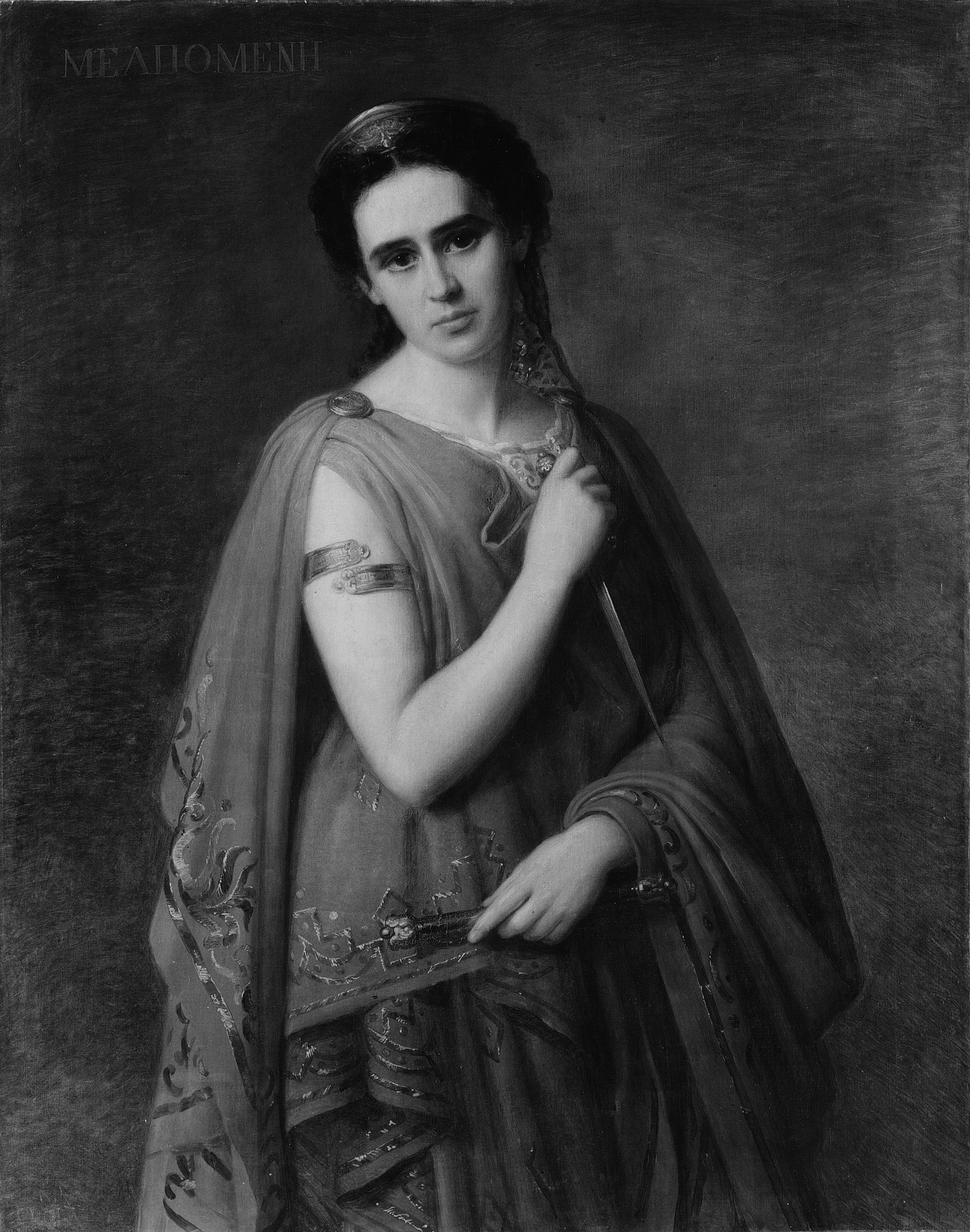
Melpomene by Joseph Fagnani (1869)

Melpomene (/mɛlˈpɒmɪniː/; Ancient Greek: Μελπομένη, romanized: Melpoménē, lit. 'to sing' or 'the one that is melodious') is the Muse of tragedy in Greek mythology. She is described as the daughter of Zeus and Mnemosyne (and therefore of power and memory) along with the other Muses, and she is often portrayed with a tragic theatrical mask.

== Etymology ==
Melpomene's name (implying the meaning "Songstress") is derived by etymologists from the Ancient Greek verb μέλπω (melpô) or from its inflexion μέλπομαι (melpomai) meaning "to celebrate with dance and song". The Oxford English Dictionary cites μέλπειν (melpein – to sing).

== Myth ==
Melpomene is one of the nine Muses, the Muse of tragedy. Hesiod, Apollodorus, and Diodorus Siculus all held that Melpomene was the daughter of Zeus and Mnemosyne. She was the sister of the other Muses, Calliope, Clio, Erato, Euterpe, Polyhymnia, Terpsichore, Thalia, and Urania. Apollodorus, Lycophron, and Gaius Julius Hyginus said that Melpomene was the mother of the sirens, though some ancient writers identified this role with other figures.

Melpomene is described as singing songs of mourning for people of note after they die, particularly for poets.

== Iconography and depiction ==
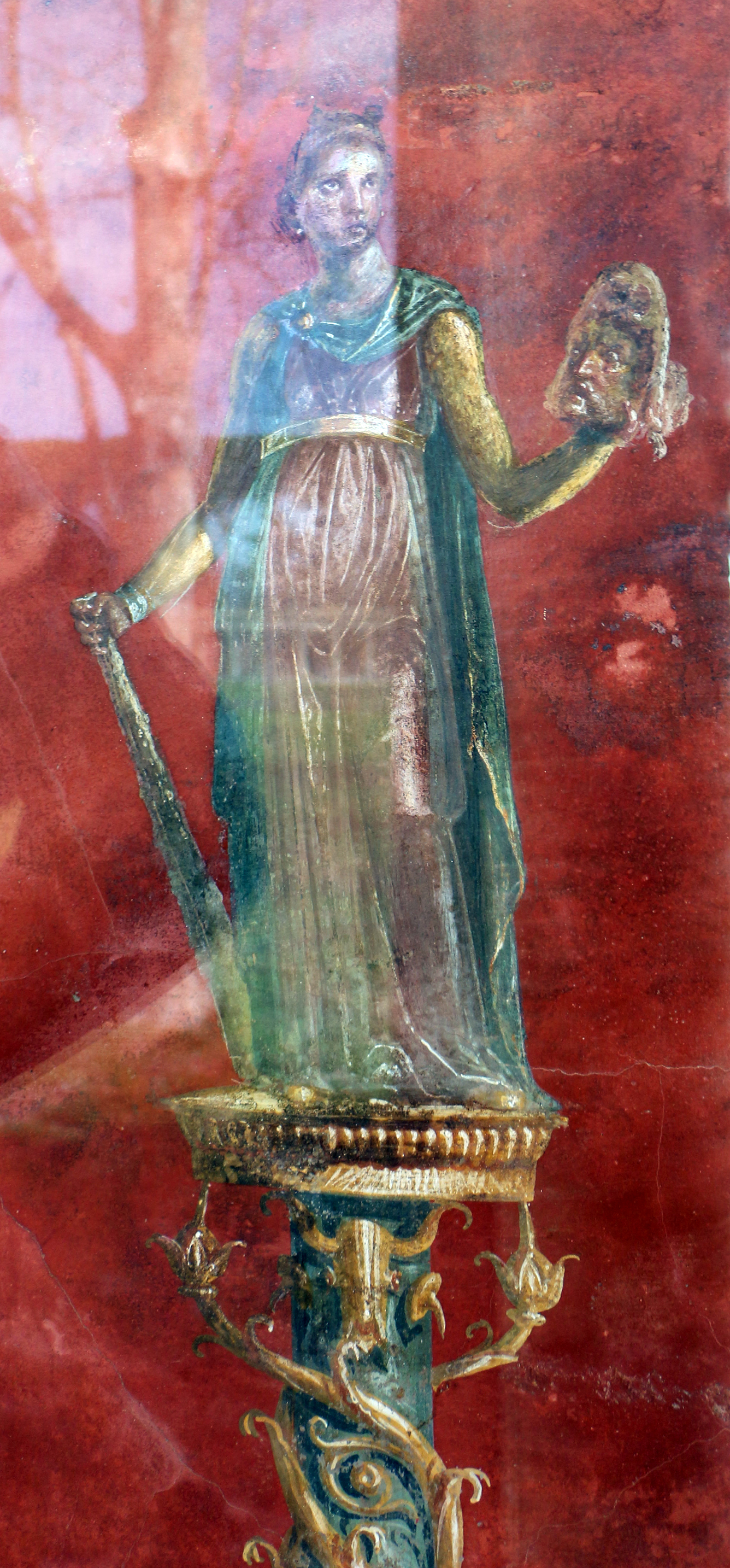
Melpomene on an antique fresco from Pompeii

Depictions of Melpomene may include a tragic mask, buskins, lyres, scrolls, and a crown of leaves. She may also be shown with a dagger and a cup. Satirist Anthony Pasquin described Melpomene as "murder-loving".

The iconographer Cesare Ripa described Melpomene in his Iconologia. An English edition describes her as "a gentlewoman all in mourning; she holds a bloody dagger in her right hand; behind her, upon the ground, a garment of cloth of gold, and diverse precious jewels; shod with cothurni". Another describes her as being "of a grave aspect, in a heroic dress, with her head finely attired; she holds a cup in one hand, and a dagger in the other, with a crown and scepter at her feet; she is shod in buskins, which were used by the ancient tragedians. The grave aspect and heroic dress denote that tragedy is a representation of famous deeds and of history".

== Invocation and use ==
=== Literature ===
In Greek and Latin poetry since Horace (d. 8 BC), it was commonly auspicious to invoke Melpomene. Horace invokes Melpomene in Ode 3.30, when he describes his poetry as a monument as great as any king's tomb. The poet asks Melpomene to crown him with a laurel wreath and make him a poet laureate.

=== Visual art ===
The oldest surviving portrait of Virgil, a mosaic dated to the first century, features Virgil between Melpomene and Clio, the muse of history. Theologian Louis A. Ruprecht interpreted this as a commentary on the similarities of recording history and writing fictional works of tragedy.

The 2018 excavation of a Roman bathhouse in Decapolis uncovered six mostly preserved statues of the Muses. The statue of Melpomene was 62 centimeters tall and made of Pentelic marble. Its head was lost, but it was identifiable by the drama mask lying on its thigh.

The tragic actress Sarah Siddons posed for several paintings depicted as Melpomene in the 1780s and 1790s. The 1784 Joshua Reynolds painting Sarah Siddons as the Tragic Muse is recognized as a high point in the careers of both Siddons and Reynolds.

=== Science ===
The minor planet 18 Melpomene was named after the muse by the British Astronomer Royal in 1852, George Biddell Airy. He chose a name representing tragedy because his daughter, Elizabeth, died on the day it was discovered, which was also the thirteenth anniversary of an earlier son's death.

== See also ==
- Muses in popular culture
- The Nine Muses
