= Trench boot =

American combat boot used in WWI

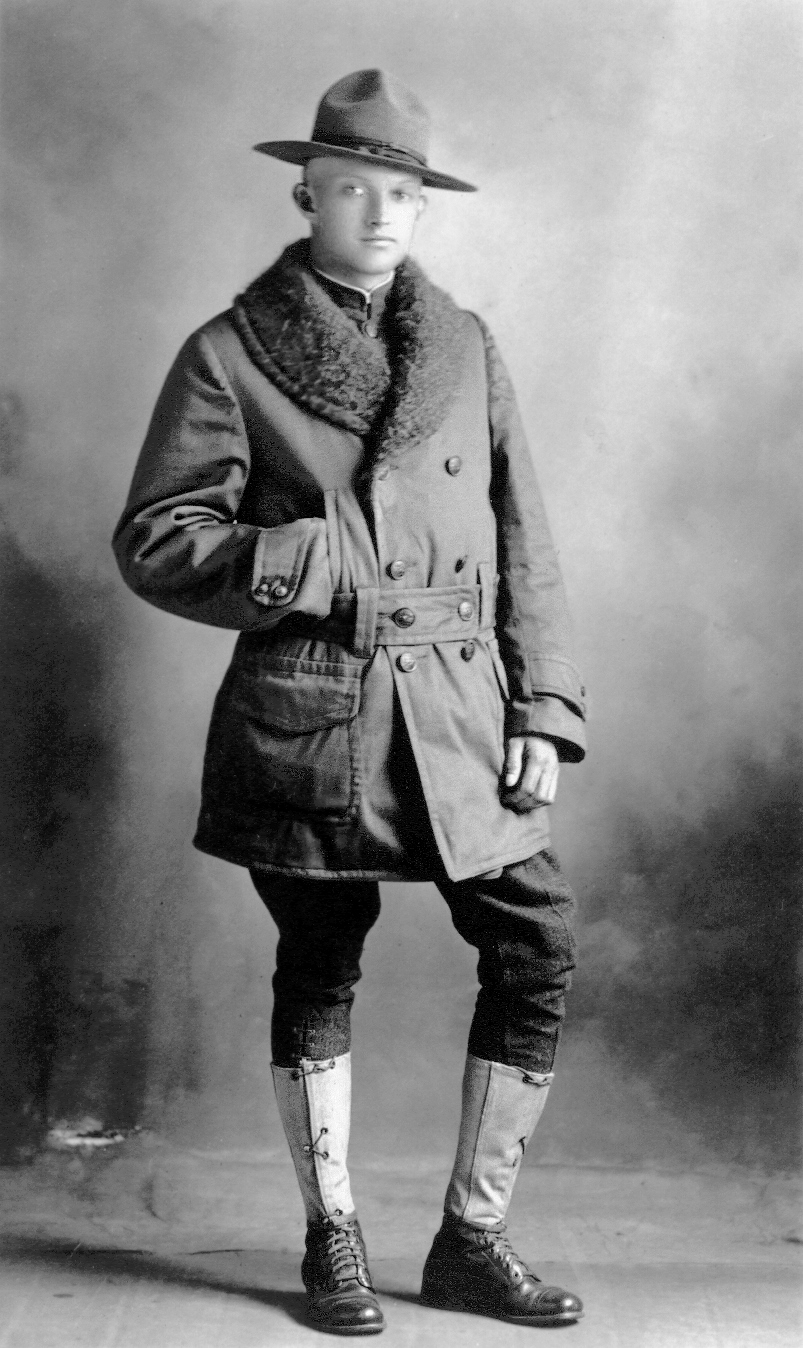
First World War US Army soldier wearing "trench boots"

The trench boot, sometimes known as the "Pershing boot," was an American combat boot used in the latter stages of World War I, made for the cold mud of trench warfare.

== Introduction ==
The 1917 Trench Boot was an adaptation of the boots American manufacturers were selling to the French and Belgian armies at the beginning of World War I. In American service, it replaced the 1912 Russet Marching Shoe. The boot was made of tanned cowhide with a half middle sole covered by a full sole, studded with five rows of hobnails. Iron plates were fixed to the heel. Although it was a great improvement, it lacked waterproofing, leading to trench foot.

== Improvements ==
In January 1918, Harry Lovejoy Rogers, Quartermaster General of the United States Army, met with a board of officers at American Expeditionary Forces Headquarters to make recommendations in order to improve the footwear of soldiers. The findings of the board were sent to General of the Armies John J. Pershing, who approved the proposed changes. He cabled the study to the War Department for action. Shortly thereafter, the improved 1918 trench boot, also called the "Pershing boot", was first issued to personnel. It used heavier leather in its construction and had several minor changes from the 1917 Boot, including a thicker sole and improved waterproofing. Due to the boots' greater size, they were known as "little tanks" by the soldiers who received them.

== See also ==
- Jackboot
- Motorcycle boot
- Riding boot
- List of boots
- List of shoe styles
