= Caligae =

Ancient Roman military boot

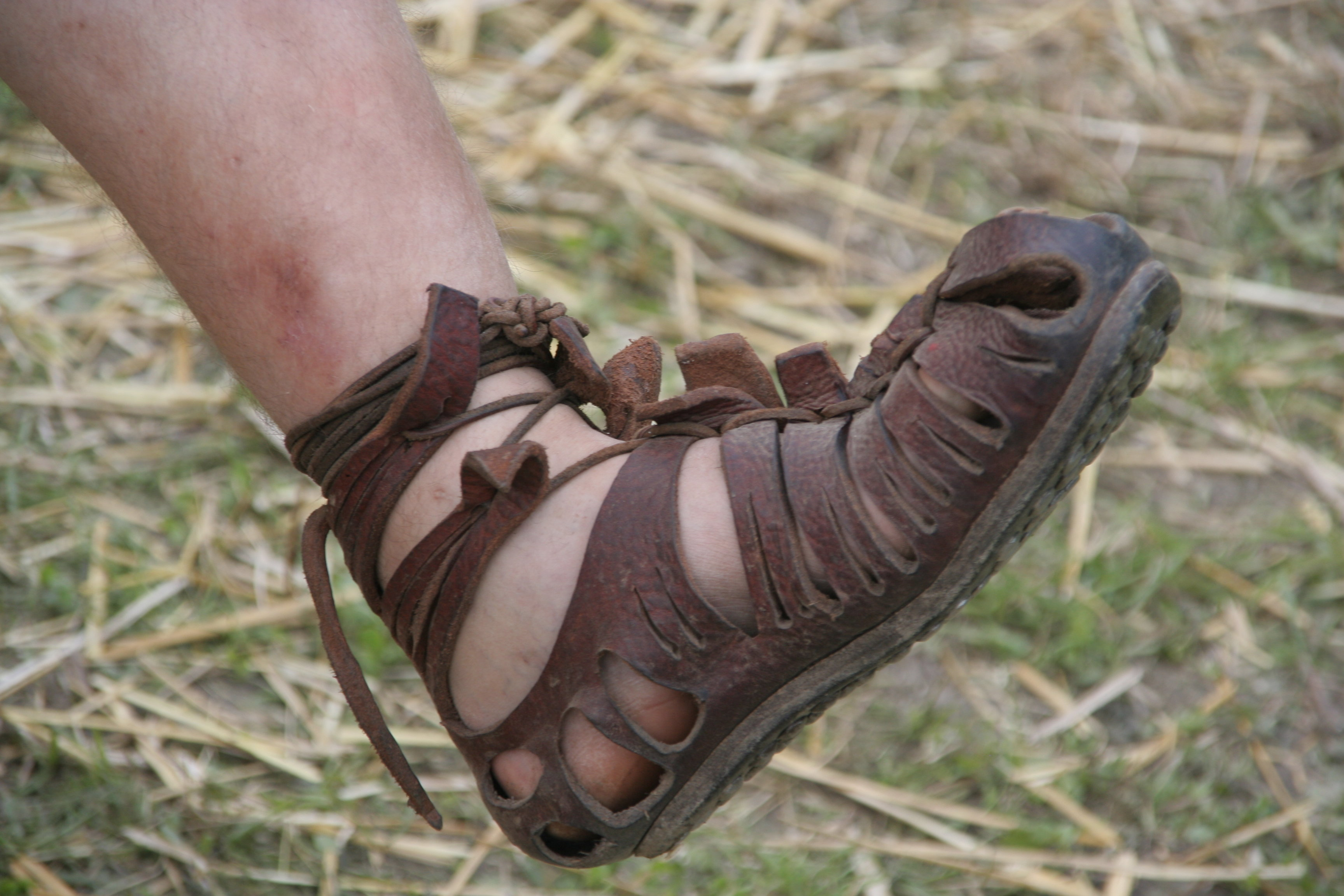
A reproduction of a Roman caliga

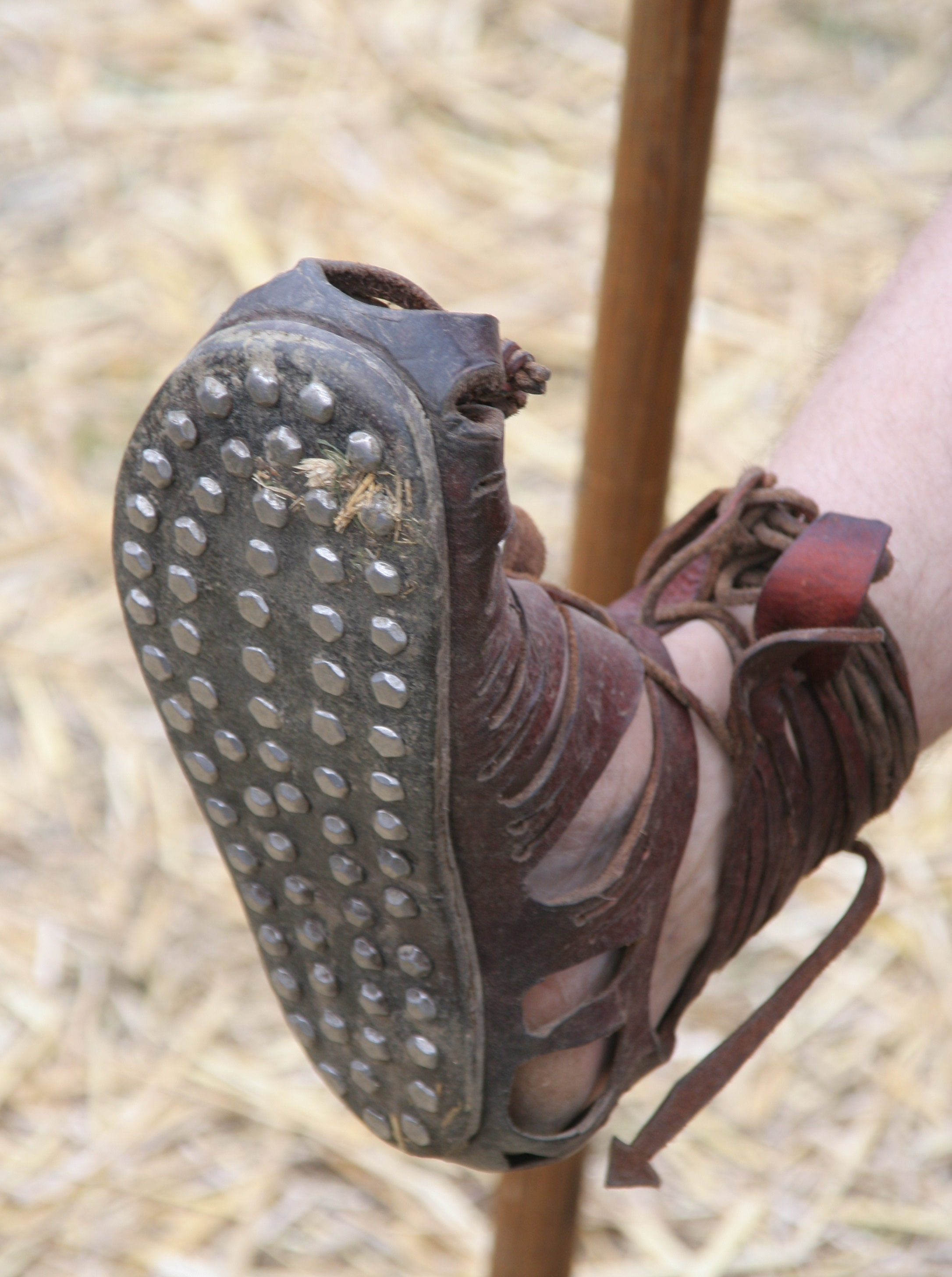
From below, showing hobnails

Caligae (Latin; sing.: caliga) are heavy-soled hobnailed military sandal-boots that were worn as standard issue by Roman legionary foot-soldiers and auxiliaries, including cavalry.

== History ==
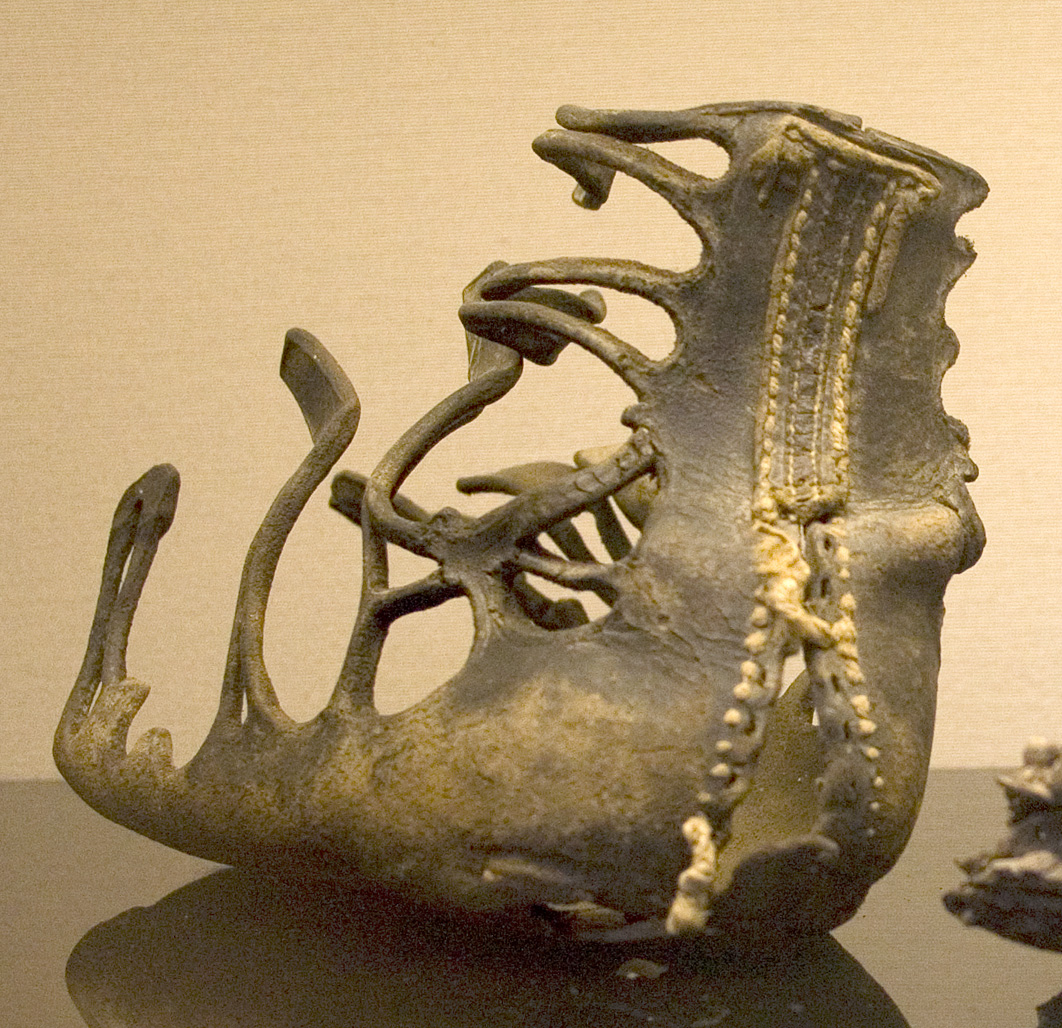
An original caliga found at Qasr Ibrim, Egypt, c. 1st century BC – 1st century AD

Caligae (sing.: caliga) are heavy-duty, thick-soled openwork boots, with hobnailed soles. They were worn by the lower ranks of Roman cavalrymen and foot-soldiers, and possibly by some centurions. A durable association of caligae with the common soldiery is evident in the latter's description as caligati ("booted ones").

In the early 1st century AD, the soldiery affectionately nicknamed the two- or three-year-old Gaius "caligula" ("little boot"), because he wore a diminutive soldier's outfit.

Occasionally, hobnailed caligae must have proved inconvenient, especially on hard surfaces; Josephus describes the killing of a caliga-shod Roman centurion who had slipped on the Temple of Jerusalem's marble floor during an attack. Nevertheless, the design of the caliga allowed for its adjustment, which would have helped reduce chafing; it probably made an "ideal marching boot", and "the thunderous sound of an attack by a hobnailed army (caligati) must have been terrifying". Indeed, the Tannaim (Jewish sages or Chazal) of Roman Judea limited their community's use of caligae in response to an instance when many Jews in hiding had misinterpreted their sound as that of approaching Romans and were killed in the resultant stampede (see Babylonian Talmud, Shabbat 60a).

Caligae would have been cooler on the march than enclosed boots. In warm, Mediterranean climates, this may have been an advantage. In northern Britain's cold, wet climate, additional woven socks or raw wool wadding in winter may have helped insulate the feet, but caligae seemed to have been abandoned there by the end of the 2nd century AD, in favour of civilian-style "closed boots" (carbatinae). By the late 4th century, this seems to have applied throughout the Empire. The emperor Diocletian's Edict on Maximum Prices (301) includes set prices for footwear described as caligae, but with no hobnails, made for civilian men, women and children.

== Design and manufacture ==
The caliga's midsole and the openwork upper were cut from a single piece of high quality cow or ox-hide. An outsole was fastened to the mid-sole, using clinching hobnails, usually of iron but occasionally bronze. The turned-back clinching nail ends were covered by an insole. Like all Roman footwear, the caliga was flat-soled. It was laced up the center of the foot and onto the top of the ankle. The Spanish scholar Isidore of Seville believed that the name "caliga" derived from the Latin callus ("hard leather"), or else from the fact that the boot was laced or tied on (ligere). Strapwork styles varied from maker to maker and region to region. The placement of hobnails is less variable; they were positioned to give optimal grip and foot-support, much like a modern sports shoe. At least one provincial manufacturer of army caligae has been identified by name.

== See also ==
- List of shoe styles
- Calceus
- Soccus
- Roman roads
- Ho Chi Minh sandals
