= Buskin =

Laced half-boot of Ancient Rome

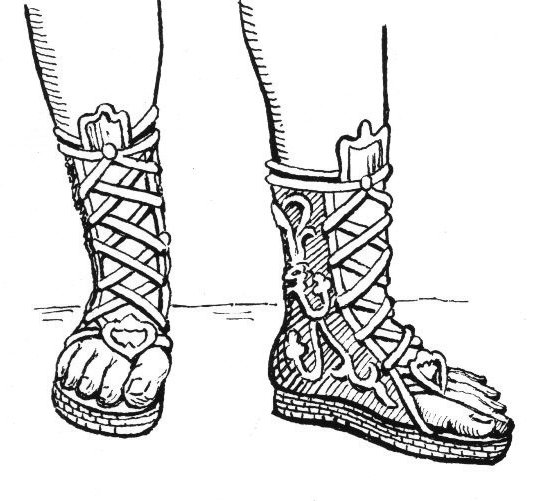
Buskins

A buskin is a knee- or calf-length boot made of leather or cloth, enclosed by material, and laced, from above the toes to the top of the boot, and open across the toes.

The word buskin, only recorded in English since 1503 meaning "half boot", is of unknown origin, perhaps from Old French brousequin (in modern French brodequin) or directly from its Middle Dutch model brosekin "small leather boot".

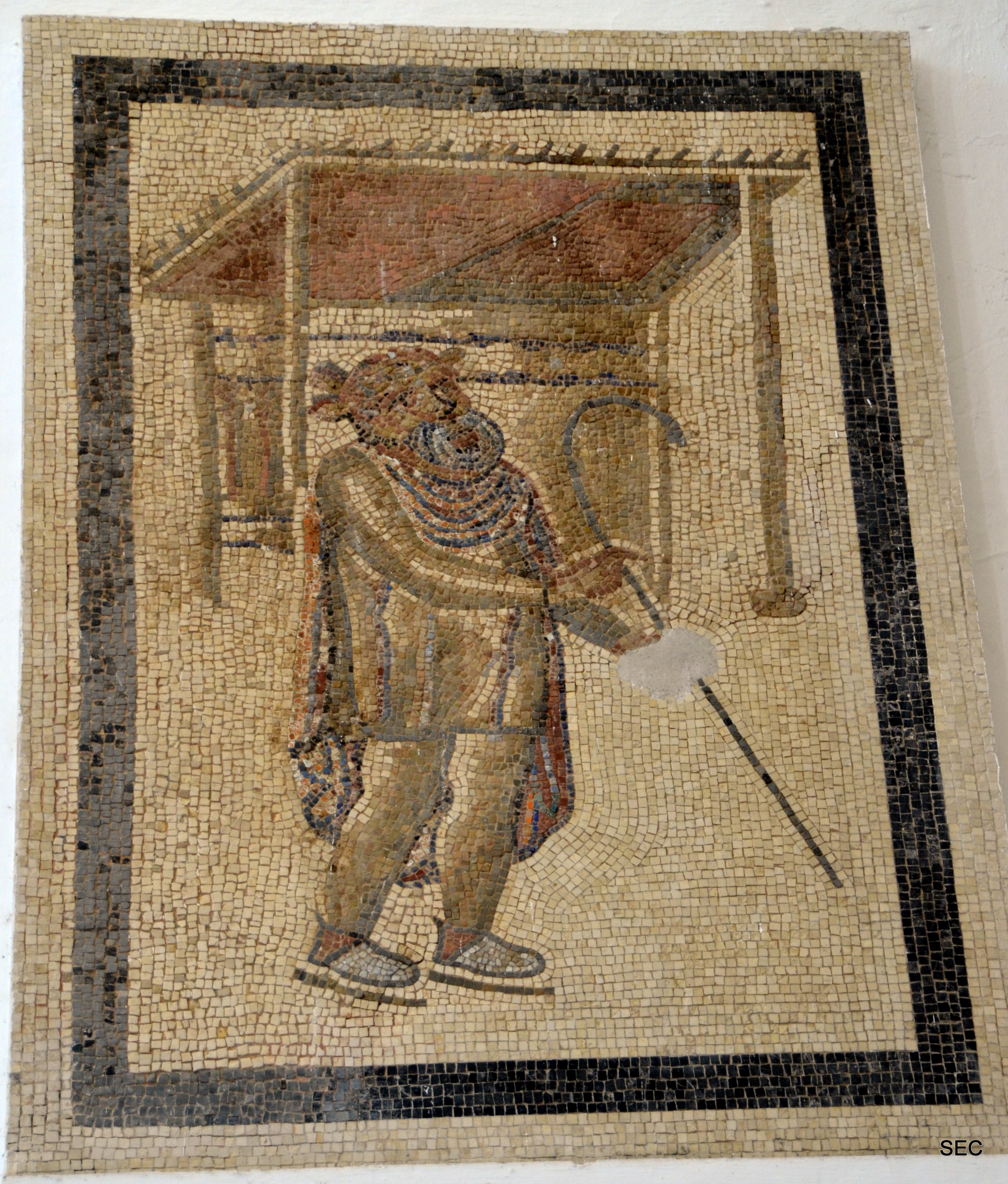
Tragic actor with cothurnus buskins, Ancient Roman mosaic from Corduba (Córdoba).

A high-heeled buskin (Greek kothornos (Greek: κόθορνος) or Latin cothurnus) was worn by Athenian tragic actors (to make them look taller). Buskins therefore sometimes appear as a symbol of tragedy, often contrasted with "sock" (from Latin soccus), the low shoe worn by comedians.

The buskin was also worn by hunters, and soldiers in Ancient Greek, Etruscan, and Roman societies, to protect the lower legs against thorns, dirt, etc.

Byzantine emperors were formally clad in purple buskins, embroidered in gold with double-headed eagles.

The 17th-century English diplomat Dudley Carleton described Anne of Denmark performing as Pallas in the 1604 masque The Vision of the Twelve Goddesses. She wore "a pair of buskins sett with rich stones".

== See also ==
- Clothing in ancient Rome
- Caligae
- List of shoe styles
