= Bull polishing =

Method for polishing leather products

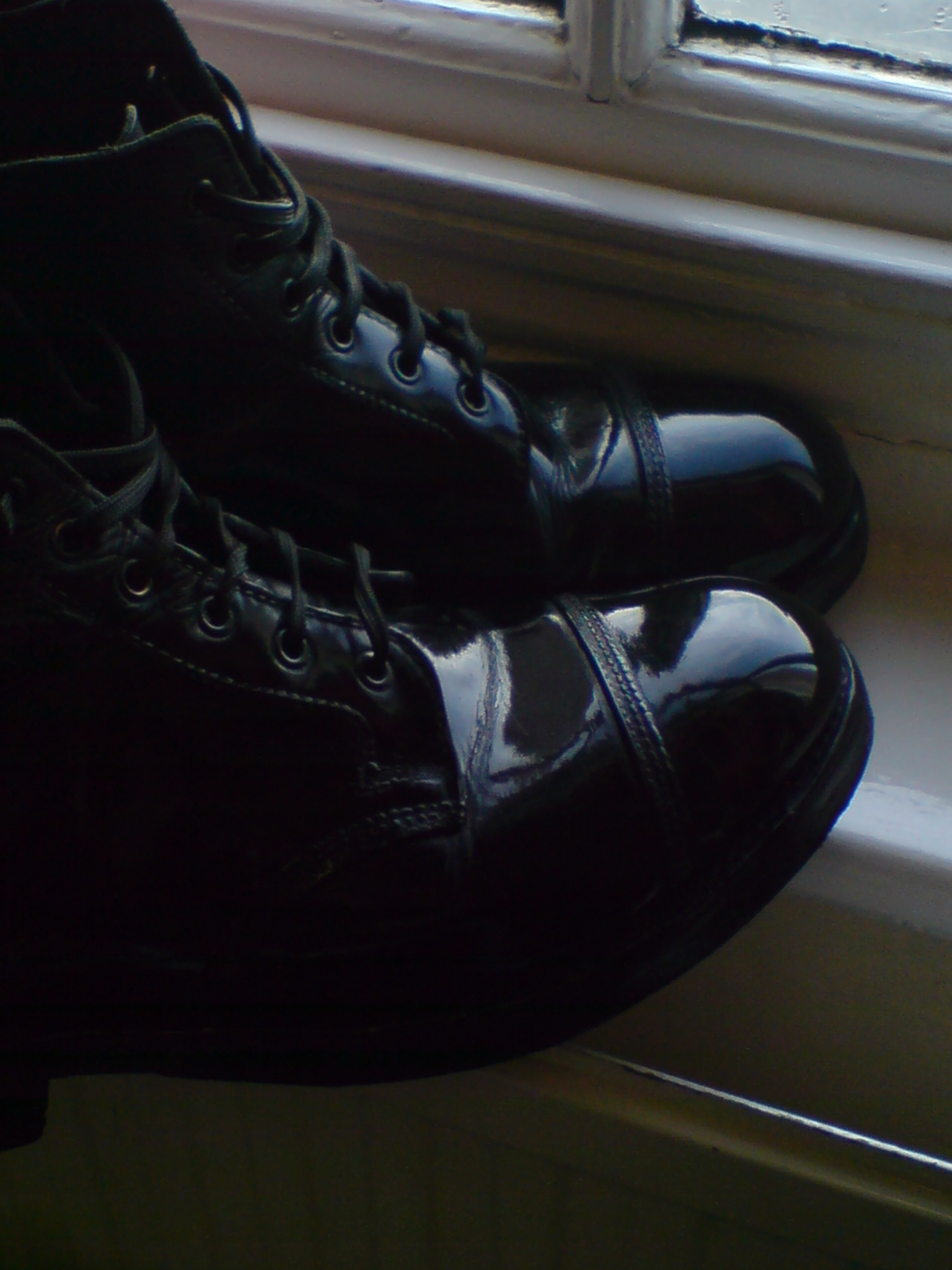
Bull polished drill boots

Bulling, Bull polishing, spit polishing, mirror shining or spit shining refers to a method for polishing leather products, usually leather dress shoes or boots, to give an extremely high shine effect. The finished effect should leave the surface of the leather highly reflective, similar to a patent leather finish. In addition to aesthetics, the wax coating can protect the leather from moisture and scuffs.

The term spit shining comes from the traditional use of saliva instead of water to wet the cloth. However, the presence of mucus in spit causes a duller shine.

The first step for a bull polish is to layer the polish with a brush, hand, or cotton cloth onto the boot or shoe. After applying a few layers of polish, use a clean, slightly damp polishing cloth to apply multiple thinner layers of shoe wax. This is accomplished by adding small dabs of polish and a few drops of water to build up the layers rather than removing them. Finally, place the boot or shoe under a running cold water tap while giving them a gentle final bull with a cloth to remove any micro scratches.

Due to the brittle nature of the shoe wax, a spit shine has to be refreshed regularly and is usually only applied on the parts of a shoe that will not bend with the walking movement of the foot, i.e. the toe caps and heels. Because of this, combined with the significant time commitment that is needed to maintain a proper mirror shine, shoe polish manufacturers have been selling parade gloss and similar products which promise similar effects with significantly less effort.

Preparing parade shoes might involve the additional step of hardening the whole shoe with melted beeswax before applying shoe wax. This serves as a fortifying base coat which keeps the mirror shine from cracking easily, but also makes the shoe unsuitable for everyday wear.

== Use in the military ==
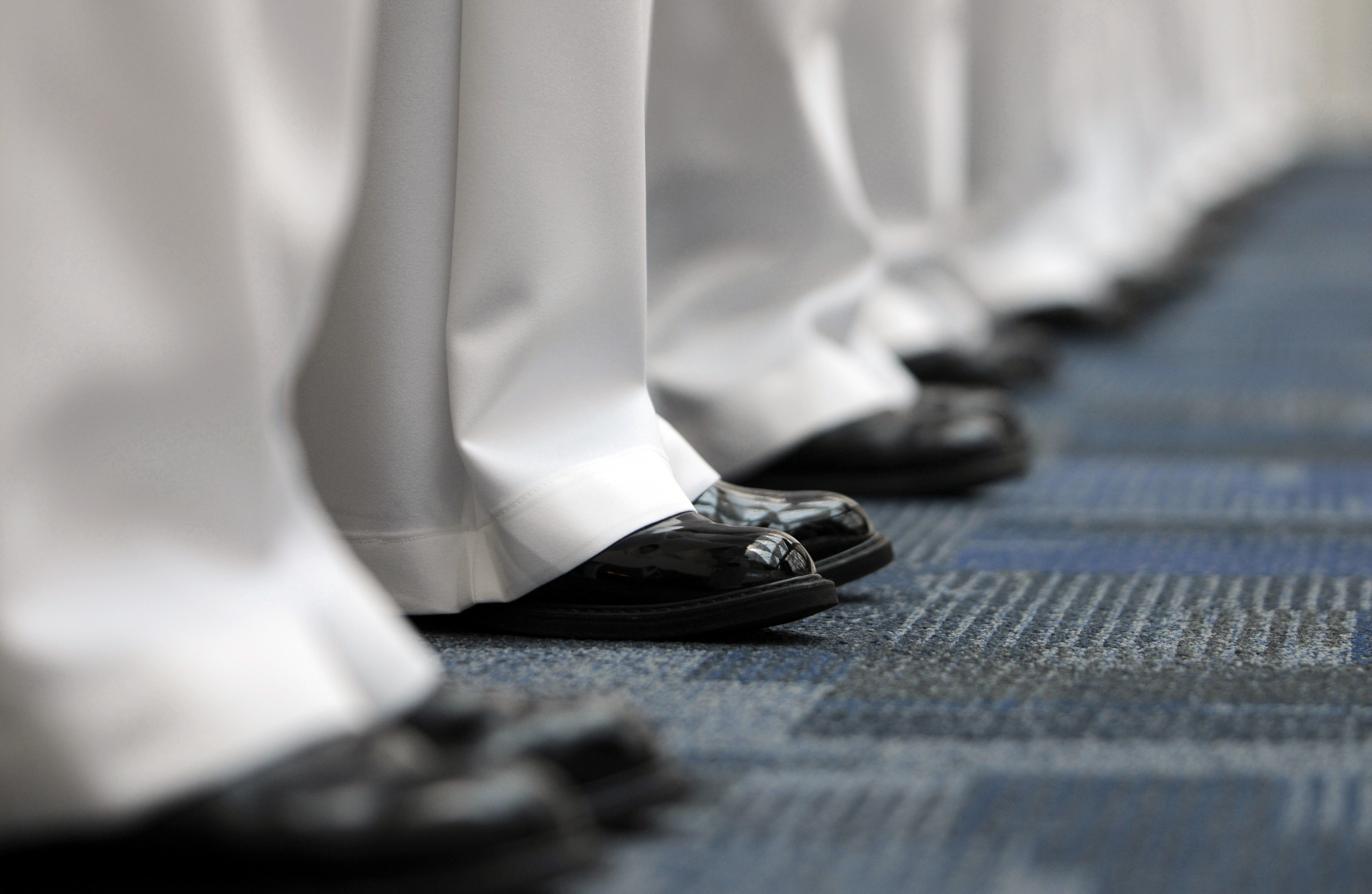
Corry Station Sailors with freshly shined boots during a change of command ceremony

The technique of bull polishing has been commonly used in the military as a traditional method of presenting leather boots for inspection during the so-called black boot era. Immaculately polished shoes represent an image of exemplary turn out, dedication and cleanliness. It is not unusual for soldiers to maintain a separate and unique pair of boots intended only for use for inspection or special ceremonial occasions.

Nowadays, combat boots that are used by the armed forces are typically made of materials that don't need to be polished. Therefore, the spit shine might be considered a lost art. The slow disappearance of shined combat boots may also have had to do with security issues. In the 1980s, the polished black combat boots, which had been common since the 1950s, were abolished in the USA on the instructions of the Pentagon. The reason was that the highly reflective leather could easily be detected by enemies even from a great distance with the help of infrared lenses.
