= Soccus =

Latin name for a kind of slipper associated to comic actors

A comedic actor in socci

A soccus (pl. socci) or sýkkhos (Ancient Greek: σύκχος, pl. sýkkhoi), sometimes given in translation as a slipper, was a loosely fitting slip-on shoe in Ancient Greece and Rome with a leather sole and separate leather, bound without the use of hobnails. The word appears to originate from the languages of ancient Anatolia. They were worn by Ancient Greek comedic actors, contrasted with the cothurni worn by tragedians, and were borrowed into Latin and worn by the ancient Romans. The soccus was considered effeminate, and the emperor Caligula is described as having worn them, possibly as a form of insult. Later socci became popular with the general public, and several types were listed in the Edict of Diocletian. The word was adopted into West Germanic languages for similarly light footwear, eventually becoming English socks.

== See also ==
- Clothing in ancient Rome
- List of shoe styles
