= Hobnail =

Short nail with a thick head

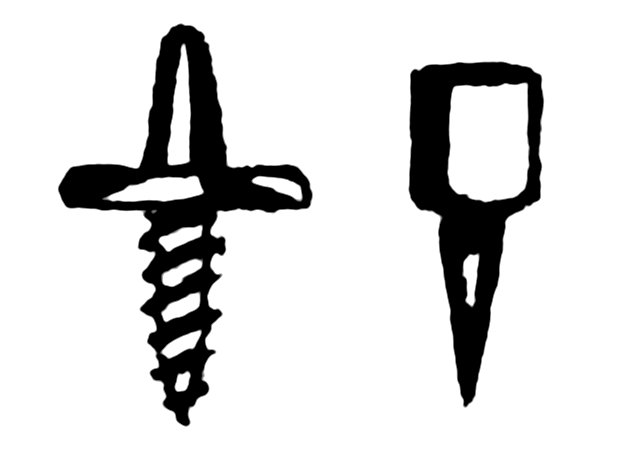
A hobnail

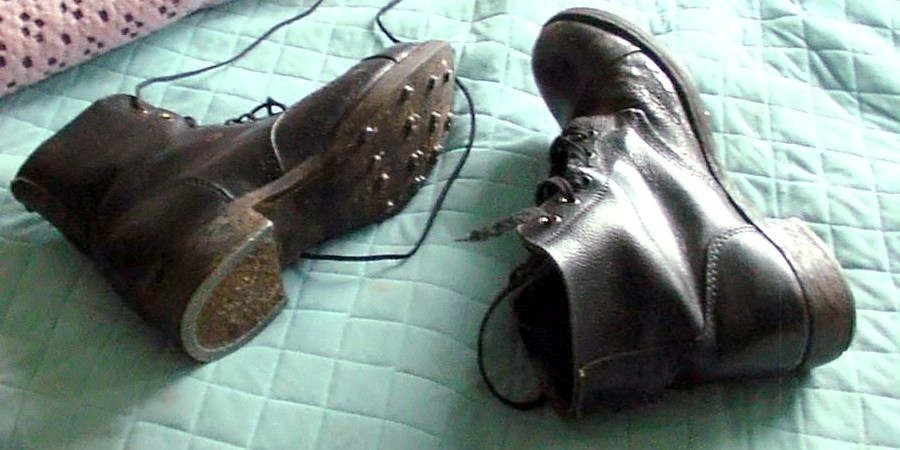
A pair of hobnailed boots

In footwear, a hobnail is a short nail with a thick head used to increase the durability of boot soles or provide traction.

== History ==
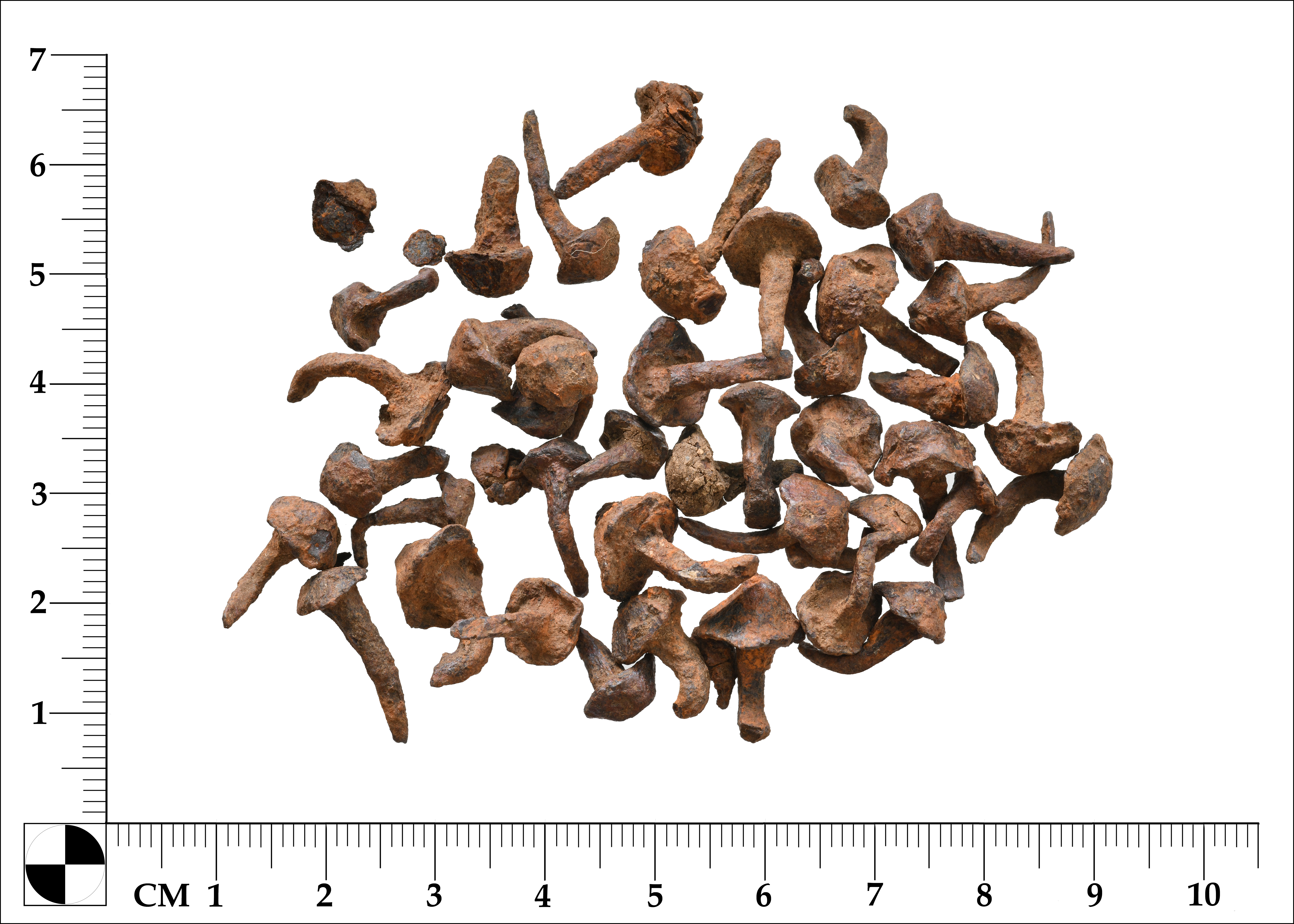
Roman hobnails were shoe tacks, a type of clinching nail; the narrowing tip was turned by a last held inside the sole as the nail was driven. So the tip did a U-turn back into the sole, clinching the nail in place.

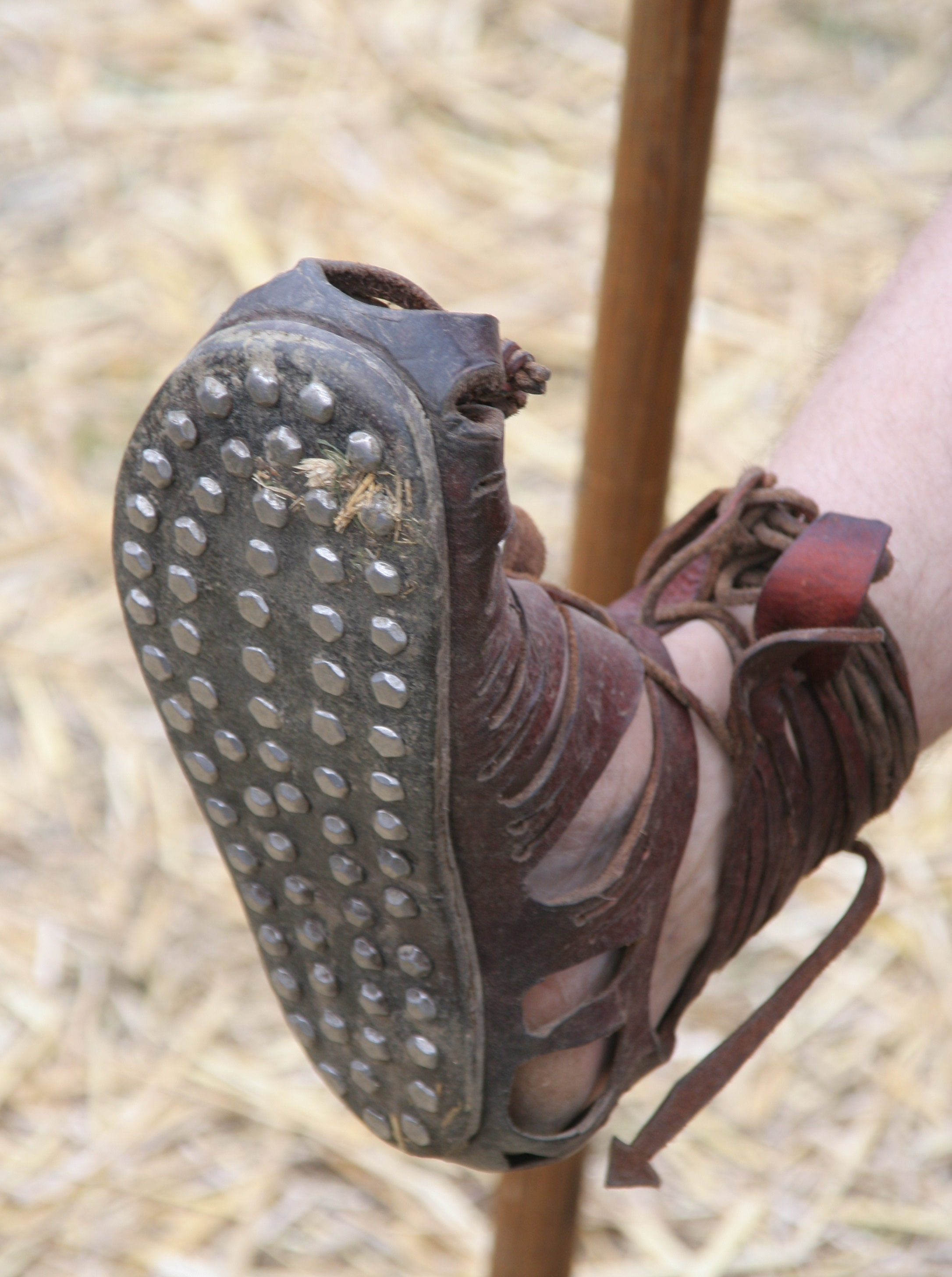
Reconstruction of Ancient Roman caliga

Hobnailed boots (in Scotland "tackety boots") are boots with hobnails (nails inserted into the soles of the boots), usually installed in a regular pattern, over the sole. They usually have an iron horseshoe-shaped insert, called a heel iron, to strengthen the heel, and an iron toe-piece. They may also have steel toecaps. The hobnails project below the sole and provide traction on soft or rocky terrain and snow, but they tend to slide on smooth, hard surfaces.

They have been used since antiquity for inexpensive durable footwear, often by workmen and the military. Examples include the caligae of the Roman military, the "ammo boot" in use by the British and Commonwealth armies from the 1860s and the US Army "trench boots" of World War I.

Important design work for the modern hobnailed boot was done during World War I, e.g. the "Pershing boot" in the United States. Problems experienced in designing WWI US Army boots were:

- Tearing at the backstay: solved by securing the backstay with three rows of stitching each side.
- Letting water in: solved by dubbin.
- Rotting in foul conditions in trenches: solved by chrome tanning rather than using vegetable tanning.
- Cold conducting through hobnails into the feet: that, and need for strength, solved by three thicknesses of leather in the soles.
- Sole wear: toe and heel irons in addition to hobnails.

== Uses ==
Hobnailed boots were formerly common in mountaineering to grip on sloping rock surfaces. These boots tended to have large pointed hobnails on the extreme edges of the soles and heels to grip small roughness on steeply sloping rock and on snow, but have become less common with the invention of crampons.

Homemade hobnailed boots, which provide traction on ice and snow, can be created by driving roofing nails (with cut-off ends) through used rubber boots, which are then worn with normal shoes on the inside.

A form of hobnailed boots were used by the British Royal Air Force for both ground staff and some aircrew, from the 1920s until just after the end of World War II.

== See also ==
- Caulk boots – spike-soled boots worn by loggers and tree planters
- List of boots
- List of shoe styles
