= Croom (name) =

Croom is a surname of English, and in some cases, North American origin.

== Etymology of the name ==
Croom is a surname of English and in some cases North American origin. There are various explanations for the surname of English origin.

- The name is a surname of English origin from the nickname of a hunchback or cripple, derived from Middle English crom(p), Old English crumb, meaning "bent", "crooked" and "stooping".
- The name can also be a metonymic occupational name for the maker, seller or user of hooks. It is derived from the Middle English crome, cromb, meaning "hook", "crook".
- The name may also be a habitational name after Croome in the East Riding of Yorkshire or Croome in Worcestershire. The place in Yorkshire is named from the Old English crohum which is a dative plural of croh meaning "corner", "blend". The place in Worcestershire is named after an old British name for a river.
- In North America, Croom, in some cases is an Americanization of the German Krumm.
- Also changed to Crume in the 1600s by Daniel Croom when he emigrated to the United States of America, in an effort to Americanize the name. Many families carry this spelling today.

== Croom ==
=== People with the surname Croom ===
- Alexandra Croom, British archaeologist
- Alfred Croom (1896–1947), English cricketer
- Corey Croom (born 1971), American football player
- Larry Croom (born 1981), American, professional American football player
- Sylvester Croom, (born 1954), American, football head coach at Mississippi State University and first black head coach in the Southeastern Conference
- Sylvester Croom Sr., father of Sylvester Croom and former chaplain of the University of Alabama Athletes. He is also recognized by the University of Alabama as one of the 40 pioneers of civil rights in the state of Alabama

=== People with the middle name Croom ===
- George Croom Robertson (1842–1892), Scottish philosopher

=== Other ===
- David Croom-Johnson (1914–2000), British barrister and judge
- Reginald Croom-Johnson (1879–1957), British politician and judge
- Austen Croom-Johnson (1909–1964), English-born composer, radio producer, and New York-based jingle writer
