= Clothing in ancient Rome =

Garments worn by Romans in the classical period

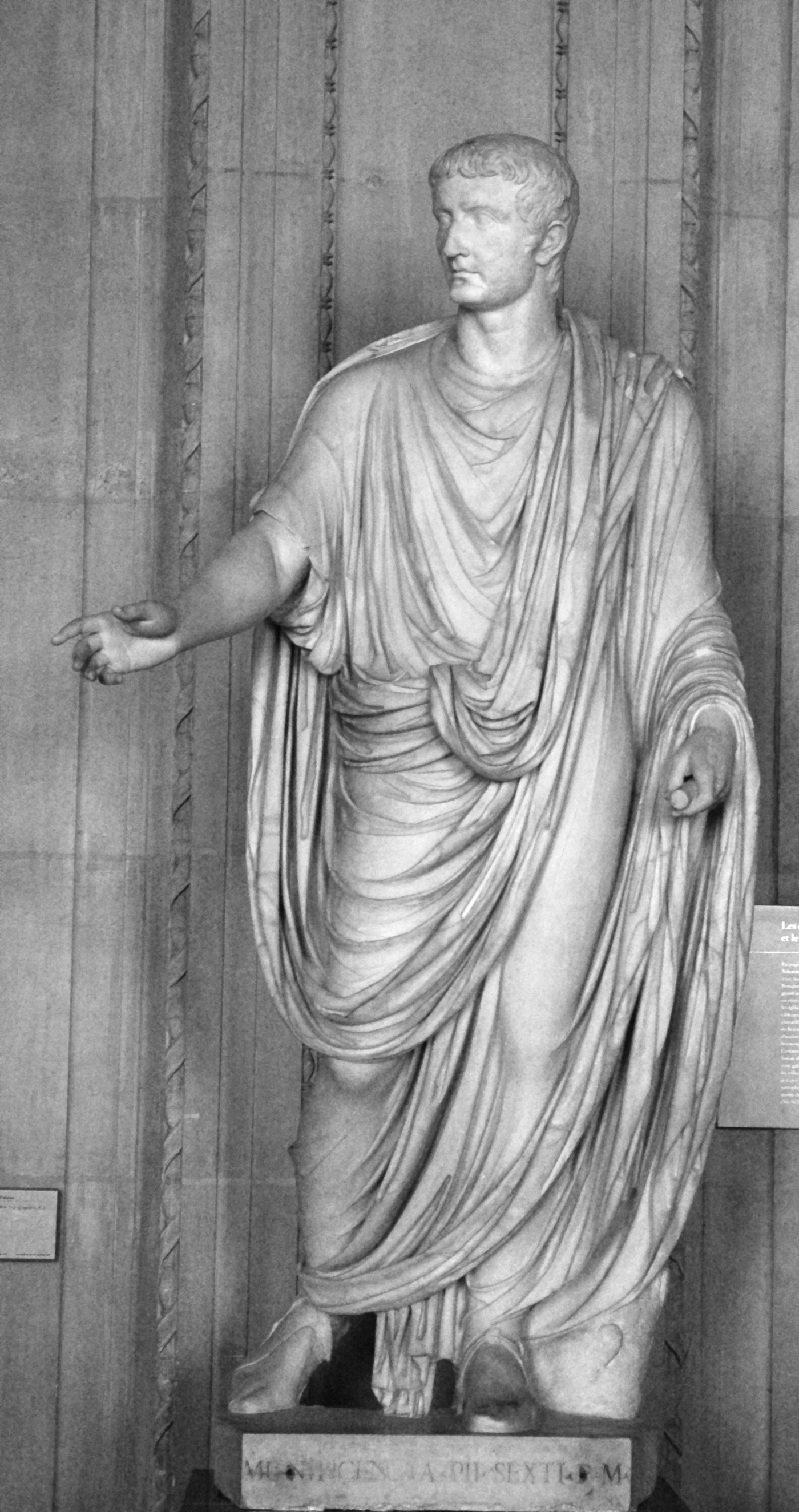
Statue of the Emperor Tiberius showing a draped toga of the 1st century AD

Clothing in ancient Rome generally comprised a short-sleeved or sleeveless, knee-length tunic for men and boys, and a longer, usually sleeved tunic for women and girls. On formal occasions, adult male citizens could wear a woolen toga, draped over their tunic, and married citizen women wore a woolen mantle, known as a palla, over a stola, a simple, long-sleeved, voluminous garment that modestly hung to cover the feet. Clothing, footwear and accoutrements identified gender, status, rank and social class. This was especially apparent in the distinctive, privileged official dress of magistrates, priesthoods and the military.

The toga was considered Rome's "national costume," privileged to Roman citizens but for day-to-day activities most Romans preferred more casual, practical and comfortable clothing; the tunic, in various forms, was the basic garment for all classes, both sexes and most occupations. It was usually made of linen, and was augmented as necessary with underwear, or with various kinds of cold-or-wet weather wear, such as knee-breeches for men, and cloaks, coats and hats. In colder parts of the empire, full length trousers were worn. Most urban Romans wore shoes, slippers, boots or sandals of various types; in the countryside, some wore clogs.

Most clothing was simple in structure and basic form, and its production required minimal cutting and tailoring, but all was produced by hand and every process required skill, knowledge and time. Spinning and weaving were thought virtuous, frugal occupations for Roman women of all classes. Wealthy matrons, including Augustus' wife Livia, might show their traditionalist values by producing home-spun clothing, but most men and women who could afford it bought their clothing from specialist artisans. The manufacture and trade of clothing and the supply of its raw materials made an important contribution to the Roman economy. Relative to the overall basic cost of living, even simple clothing was expensive, and was recycled many times down the social scale.

Rome's governing elite produced laws designed to limit public displays of personal wealth and luxury. None were particularly successful, as the same wealthy elite had an appetite for luxurious and fashionable clothing. Exotic fabrics were available, at a price; silk damasks, translucent gauzes, cloth of gold, and intricate embroideries; and vivid, expensive dyes such as saffron yellow or Tyrian purple. Not all dyes were costly, however, and most Romans wore colourful clothing. Clean, bright clothing was a mark of respectability and status among all social classes. The fastenings and brooches used to secure garments such as cloaks provided further opportunities for personal embellishment and display.

== Formal wear for citizens ==
Roman society was graded into several citizen and non-citizen classes and ranks, ruled by a powerful minority of wealthy, landowning citizen-aristocrats. Even the lowest grade of citizenship carried certain privileges denied to non-citizens, such as the right to vote for representation in government. In tradition and law, an individual's place in the citizen-hierarchy – or outside it – should be immediately evident in their clothing. The seating arrangements at theatres and games enforced this idealised social order, with varying degrees of success.

In literature and poetry, Romans were the gens togata ("togate race"), descended from a tough, virile, intrinsically noble peasantry of hard-working, toga-wearing men and women. The toga's origins are uncertain; it may have begun as a simple, practical work-garment and blanket for peasants and herdsmen. It eventually became formal wear for male citizens; at much the same time, respectable female citizens adopted the stola. The morals, wealth and reputation of citizens were subject to official scrutiny. Male citizens who failed to meet a minimum standard could be demoted in rank, and denied the right to wear a toga; by the same token, female citizens could be denied the stola. Respectable citizens of either sex might thus be distinguished from freedmen, foreigners, slaves and infamous persons.

=== Toga ===
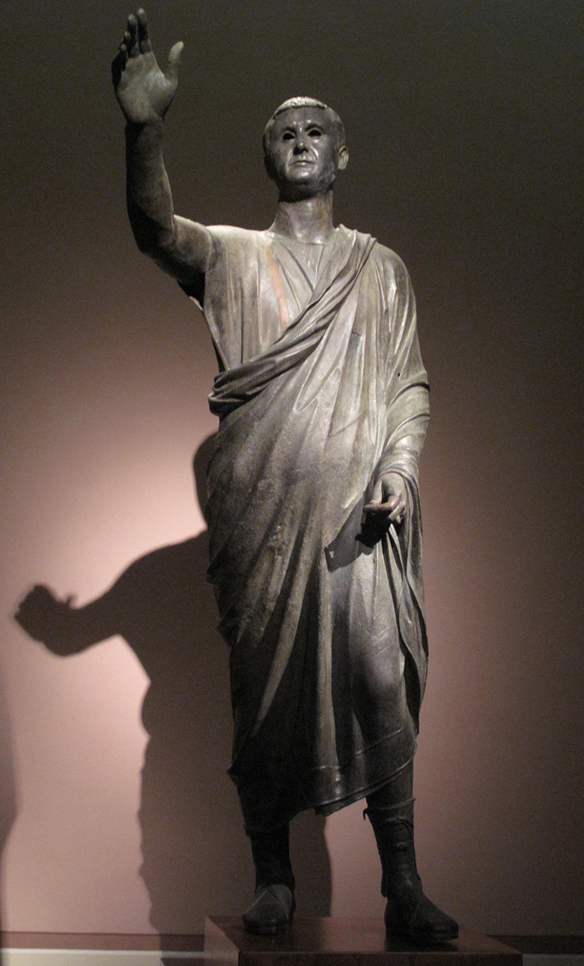
The Orator, c. 100 BC, an Etrusco-Roman bronze sculpture depicting Aule Metele (Latin: Aulus Metellus), an Etruscan man of Roman senatorial rank, engaging in rhetoric. He wears senatorial shoes, and a toga praetexta of "skimpy" (exigua) Republican type. The statue features an inscription in the Etruscan alphabet

The toga virilis ("toga of manhood") was a semi-elliptical, white woolen cloth some 6 feet (1.8 m) in width and 12 feet (3.7 m) in length, draped across the shoulders and around the body. It was usually worn over a plain white linen tunic. A commoner's toga virilis was a natural off-white; the senatorial version was more voluminous, and brighter. The toga praetexta of curule magistrates and some priesthoods added a wide purple edging, and was worn over a tunic with two vertical purple stripes. It could also be worn by noble and freeborn boys and girls, and represented their protection under civil and divine law. Equites wore the trabea (a shorter, "equestrian" form of white toga or a purple-red wrap, or both) over a white tunic with two narrow vertical purple-red stripes. The toga pulla, used for mourning, was made of dark wool. The rare, prestigious toga picta and tunica palmata were purple, embroidered with gold. They were originally awarded to Roman generals for the day of their triumph, but became official dress for emperors and Imperial consuls.

From at least the late Republic onward, the upper classes favoured ever longer and larger togas, increasingly unsuited to manual work or physically active leisure. Togas were expensive, heavy, hot and sweaty, hard to keep clean, costly to launder and challenging to wear correctly. They were best suited to stately processions, oratory, sitting in the theatre or circus, and self-display among peers and inferiors while "ostentatiously doing nothing" at salutationes. These early morning, formal "greeting sessions" were an essential part of Roman life, in which clients visited their patrons, competing for favours or investment in business ventures. A client who dressed well and correctly – in his toga, if a citizen – showed respect for himself and his patron, and might stand out among the crowd. A canny patron might equip his entire family, his friends, freedmen, even his slaves, with elegant, costly and impractical clothing, implying his entire extended family's condition as one of "honorific leisure" (otium), buoyed by limitless wealth.

The vast majority of citizens had to work for a living, and avoided wearing the toga whenever possible. Several emperors tried to compel its use as the public dress of true Romanitas but none were particularly successful. The aristocracy clung to it as a mark of their prestige, but eventually abandoned it for the more comfortable and practical pallium.

== Tunics and undergarments ==
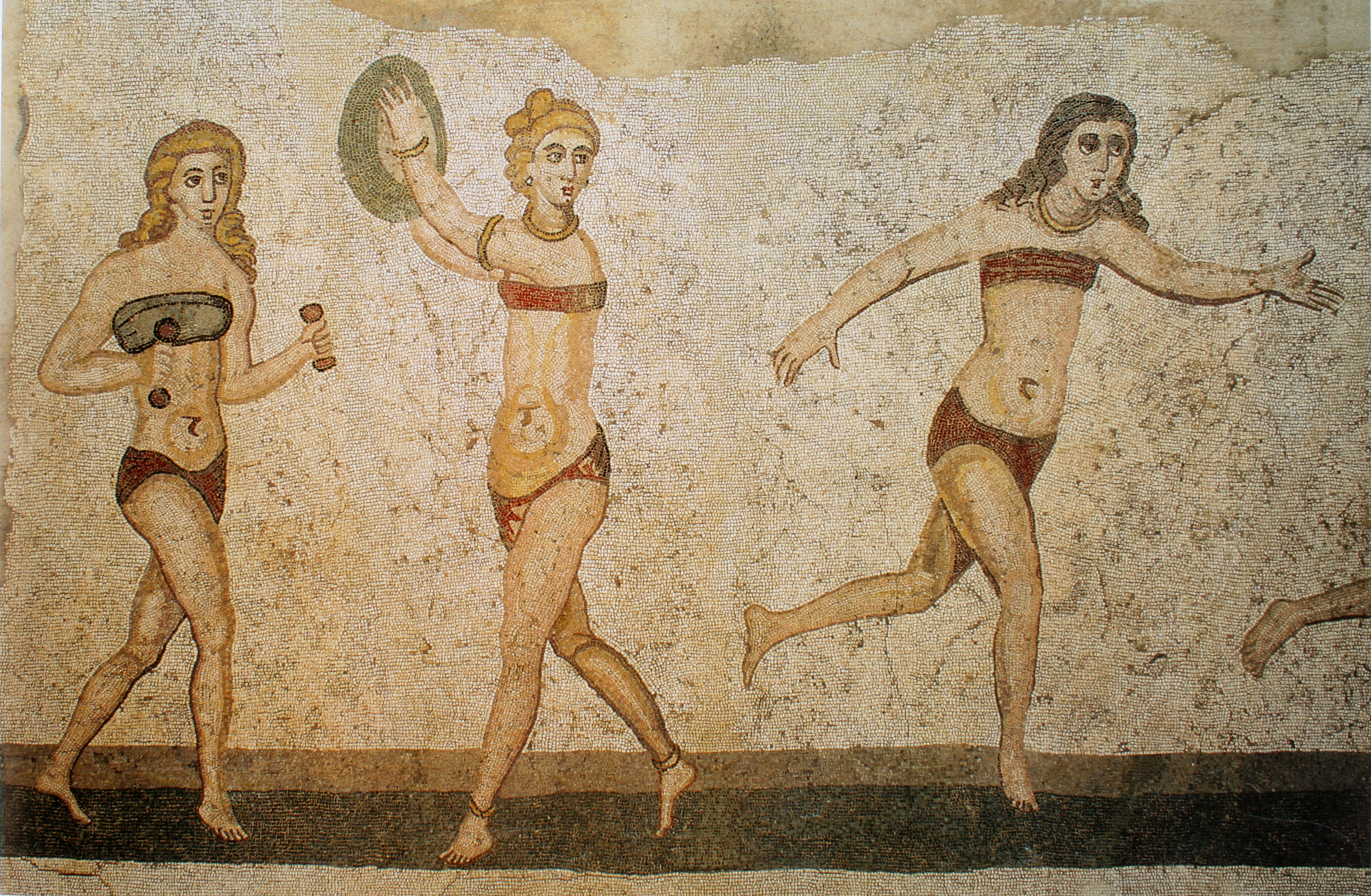
4th-century mosaic from Villa del Casale, Sicily, showing "bikini girls" in an athletic contest

The basic garment for both genders and all classes was the tunica (tunic). In its simplest form, the tunic was a single rectangle of woven fabric, originally woolen, but from the mid-republic onward, increasingly made from linen. It was sewn into a wide, sleeveless tubular shape and pinned around the shoulders like a Greek chiton, to form openings for the neck and arms. In some examples from the eastern part of the empire, neck openings were created in the weaving. Sleeves could be added, or formed in situ from the excess width. Most working men wore knee-length, short-sleeved tunics, secured at the waist with a belt. Some traditionalists considered long sleeved tunics appropriate only for women, very long tunics on men as a sign of effeminacy, and short or unbelted tunics as marks of servility; nevertheless, very long-sleeved, loosely belted tunics were also fashionably unconventional and were adopted by some Roman men; for example, by Julius Caesar. Women's tunics were usually ankle or foot-length, long-sleeved, and could be worn loosely or belted. For comfort and protection from cold, both sexes could wear a soft under-tunic or vest (subucula) beneath a coarser over-tunic; in winter, the Emperor Augustus, whose physique and constitution were never particularly robust, wore up to four tunics, over a vest. Although essentially simple in basic design, tunics could also be luxurious in their fabric, colours and detailing.

Loincloths, known as subligacula or subligaria could be worn under a tunic. They could also be worn on their own, particularly by slaves who engaged in hot, sweaty or dirty work. Women wore both loincloth and strophium (a breast cloth) under their tunics; and some wore tailored underwear for work or leisure. Roman women could also wear a fascia pectoralis, a breast-wrap similar to a modern women's bra. A 4th-century AD Sicilian mosaic shows several "bikini girls" performing athletic feats; in 1953 a Roman leather bikini bottom was excavated from a well in London.

=== Stola and palla ===
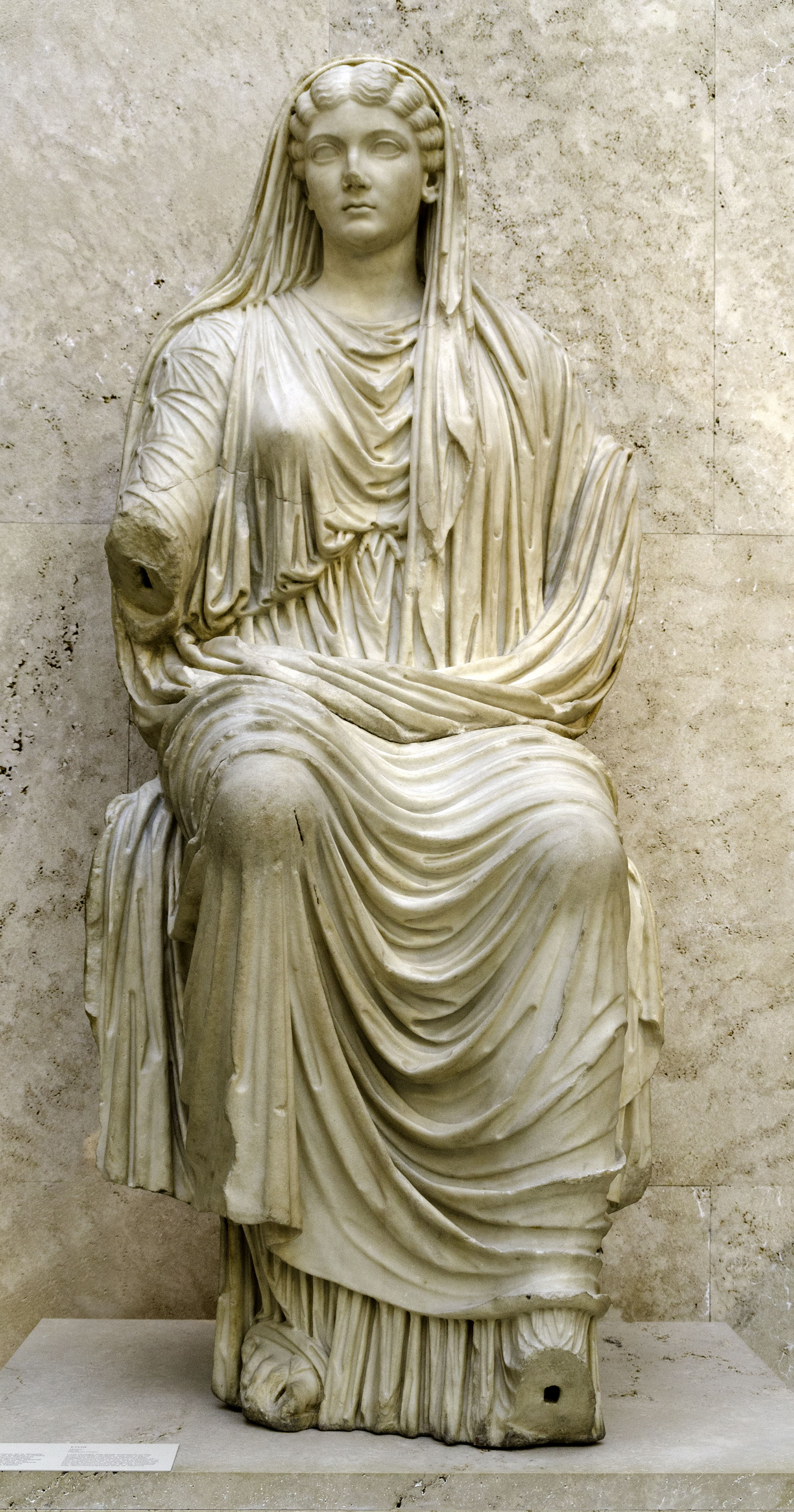
Statue of Livia Drusilla wearing a stola and palla

Besides tunics, married citizen women wore a simple garment known as a stola (pl. stolae) which was associated with traditional Roman female virtues, especially modesty. In the early Roman Republic, the stola was reserved for patrician women. Shortly before the Second Punic War, the right to wear it was extended to plebeian matrons, and to freedwomen who had acquired the status of matron through marriage to a citizen. Stolae typically comprised two rectangular segments of cloth joined at the side by fibulae and buttons in a manner allowing the garment to be draped in elegant but concealing folds, covering the whole body including the feet.

Over the stola, citizen-women often wore the palla, a sort of rectangular shawl up to 11 feet long, and five wide. It could be worn as a coat, or draped over the left shoulder, under the right arm, and then over the left arm. Outdoors and in public, a chaste matron's hair was bound up in woollen bands (fillets, or vitae) in a high-piled style known as tutulus. Her face was concealed from the public, male gaze with a veil; her palla could also serve as a hooded cloak. Two ancient literary sources mention use of a coloured strip or edging (a limbus) on a woman's "mantle", or on the hem of their tunic; probably a mark of their high status, and presumably purple. Outside the confines of their homes, matrons were expected to wear veils; a matron who appeared without a veil was held to have repudiated her marriage. High-caste women convicted of adultery, and high-class female prostitutes (meretrices), were not only forbidden public use of the stola, but might have been expected to wear a toga muliebris (a "woman's toga") as a sign of their infamy.

== Freedmen, freedwomen and slaves ==
For citizens, salutationes meant wearing the toga appropriate to their rank. For freedmen, it meant whatever dress disclosed their status and wealth; a man should be what he seemed, and low rank was no bar to making money. Freedmen were forbidden to wear any kind of toga. Elite invective mocked the aspirations of wealthy, upwardly mobile freedmen who boldly flouted this prohibition, donned a toga, or even the trabea of an equites, and inserted themselves as equals among their social superiors at the games and theatres. If detected, they were evicted from their seats.

Notwithstanding the commonplace snobbery and mockery of their social superiors, some freedmen and freedwomen were highly cultured, and most would have had useful personal and business connections through their former master. Those with an aptitude for business could amass a fortune; and many did. They could function as patrons in their own right, fund public and private projects, own grand town-houses, and "dress to impress".

There was no standard costume for slaves; they might dress well, badly, or barely at all, depending on circumstance and the will of their owner. Urban slaves in prosperous households might wear some form of livery; cultured slaves who served as household tutors might be indistinguishable from well-off freedmen. Slaves serving out in the mines might wear nothing. For Appian, a slave dressed as well as his master signalled the end of a stable, well-ordered society. According to Seneca, tutor to Nero, a proposal that all slaves be made to wear a particular type of clothing was abandoned, for fear that the slaves should realise both their own overwhelming numbers, and the vulnerability of their masters. Advice to farm-owners by Cato the Elder and Columella on the regular supply of adequate clothing to farm-slaves was probably intended to mollify their otherwise harsh conditions, and maintain their obedience.

== Children and adolescents ==
Roman infants were usually swaddled. Apart from those few, typically formal garments reserved for adults, most children wore a scaled-down version of what their parents wore. Girls often wore a long tunic that reached the foot or instep, belted at the waist and very simply decorated, most often white. Outdoors, they might wear another tunic over it. Boys' tunics were shorter.

Boys and girls wore amulets to protect them from immoral or baleful influences such as the evil eye and sexual predation. For boys, the amulet was a bulla, worn around the neck; the equivalent for girls seems to have been a crescent-shaped lunula, though this makes only rare appearances in Roman art. The toga praetexta, which was thought to offer similar apotropaic protection, was formal wear for freeborn boys until puberty, when they gave their toga praetexta and childhood bulla into the care of their family Lares and put on the adult male's toga virilis. According to some Roman literary sources, freeborn girls might also wear – or at least, had the right to wear – a toga praetexta until marriage, when they offered their childhood toys, and perhaps their maidenly praetexta to Fortuna Virginalis; others claim a gift made to the family Lares, or to Venus, as part of their passage to adulthood. In traditionalist families, unmarried girls might be expected to wear their hair demurely bound in a fillet.

Notwithstanding such attempts to protect the maidenly virtue of Roman girls, there is little anecdotal or artistic evidence of their use or effective imposition. Some unmarried daughters of respectable families seem to have enjoyed going out and about in flashy clothing, jewellery, perfume and make-up; and some parents, anxious to find the best and wealthiest possible match for their daughters, seem to have encouraged it.

== Footwear ==
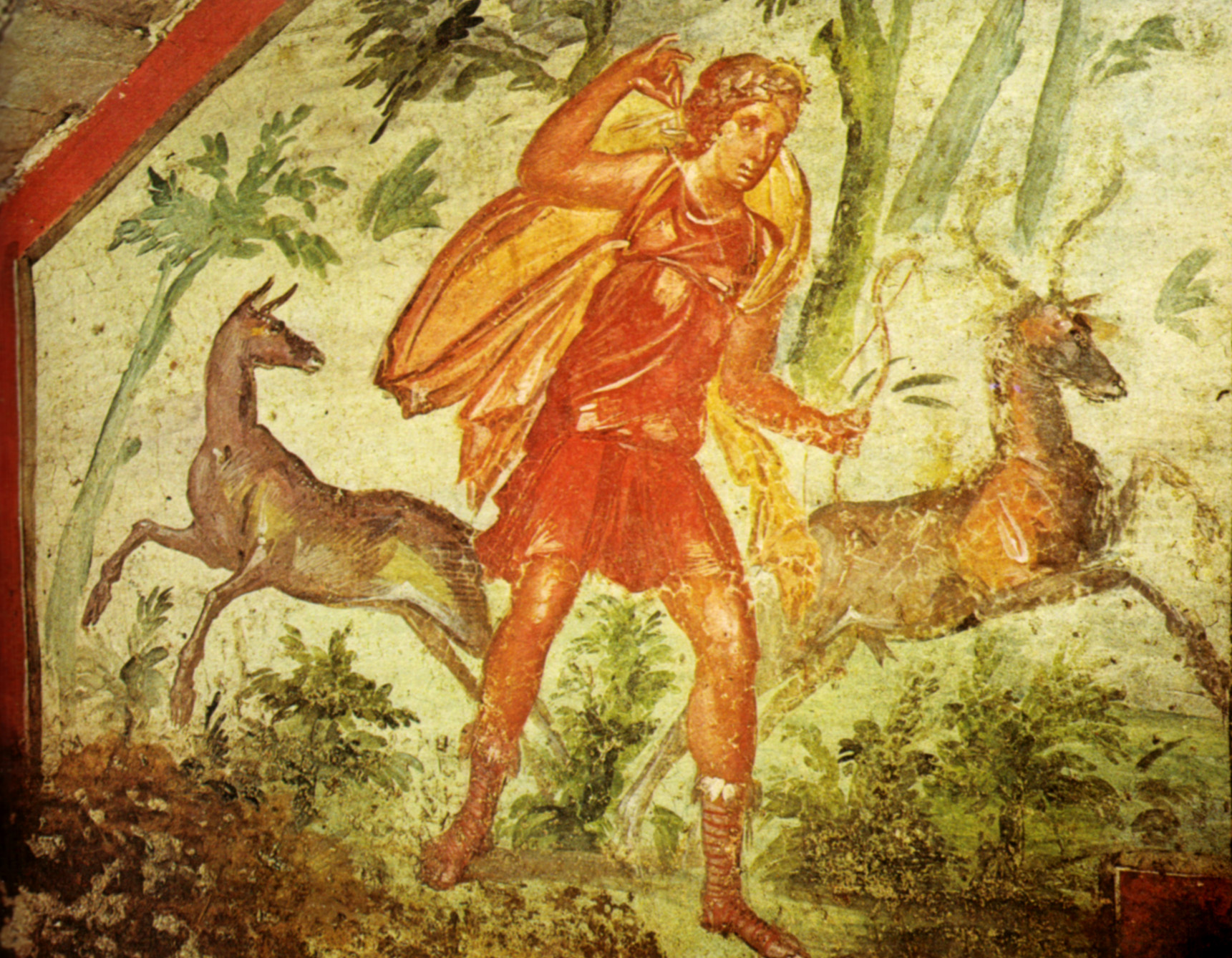
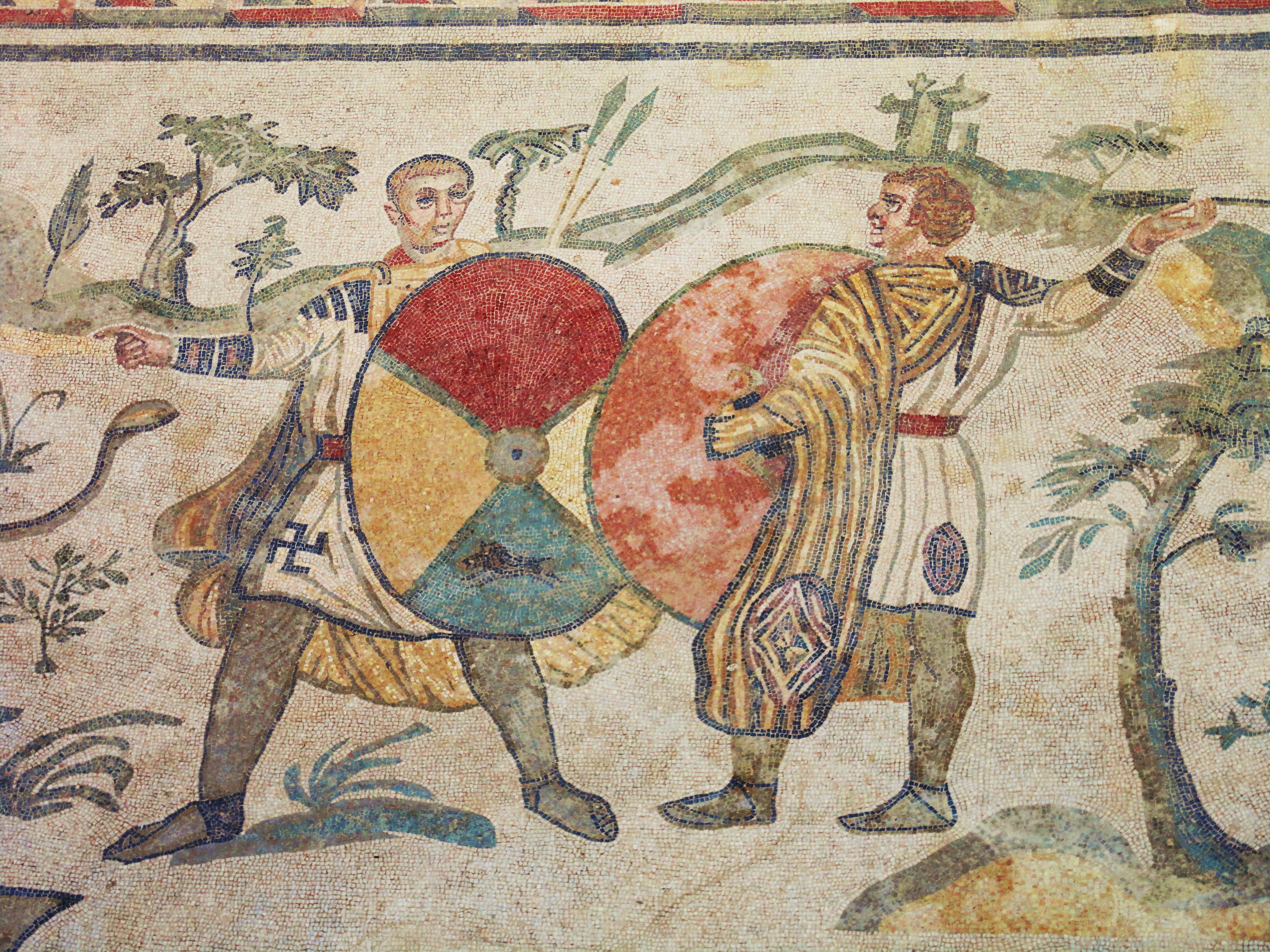
Left (or upper) image: The goddess Diana hunting in the forest with a bow, and wearing the high-laced open "Hellenistic shoe-boots" associated with deities, and some images of very high status Romans. From a fresco in the Via Livenza Hypogeum, Rome, c. 350 AD
Right (or lower) image: Detail of the "Big Game Hunt" mosaic from the Villa Romana del Casale (4th century AD), Roman Sicily, showing hunters shod in calcei, wearing vari-coloured tunics and protective leggings

Romans used a wide variety of practical and decorative footwear, all of it flat soled (without heels). Outdoor shoes were often hobnailed for grip and durability. The most common types of footwear were a one-piece shoe (carbatina), sometimes with semi-openwork uppers; a usually thin-soled sandal (solea), secured with thongs; a laced, soft half-shoe (soccus); a usually hobnailed, thick-soled walking shoe (calceus); and a heavy-duty, hobnailed standard-issue military marching boot (caliga). Thick-soled wooden clogs (sculponeae), with leather uppers, were available for use in wet weather, and by rustics and field-slaves

Archaeology has revealed many more non-standardised footwear patterns and variants in use over the existence of the Roman Empire. For the wealthy, shoemakers employed sophisticated strapwork, delicate cutting, dyes and even gold leaf to create intricate decorative patterns. Indoors, most reasonably well-off Romans of both sexes wore slippers or light shoes of felt or leather. Brides on their wedding-day may have worn distinctively orange-coloured light soft shoes or slippers (lutei socci).

Public protocol required red ankle boots for senators, and shoes with crescent-shaped buckles for equites, though some wore Greek-style sandals to "go with the crowd". Costly footwear was a mark of wealth or status, but being completely unshod need not be a mark of poverty. Cato the Younger showed his impeccable Republican morality by going publicly barefoot; many images of the Roman gods, and later, statues of the semi-divine Augustus, were unshod.

Fashions in footwear reflected changes in social conditions. For example, during the unstable middle Imperial era, the military was overtly favoured as the true basis for power; at around this time, a tough, heavy, so-called "Gallic sandal" – up to 4 inches broad at the toe – developed as outdoor wear for men and boys, reminiscent of the military boot. Meanwhile, outdoor footwear for women, young girls and children remained elegantly pointed at the toe.

== Military costume ==
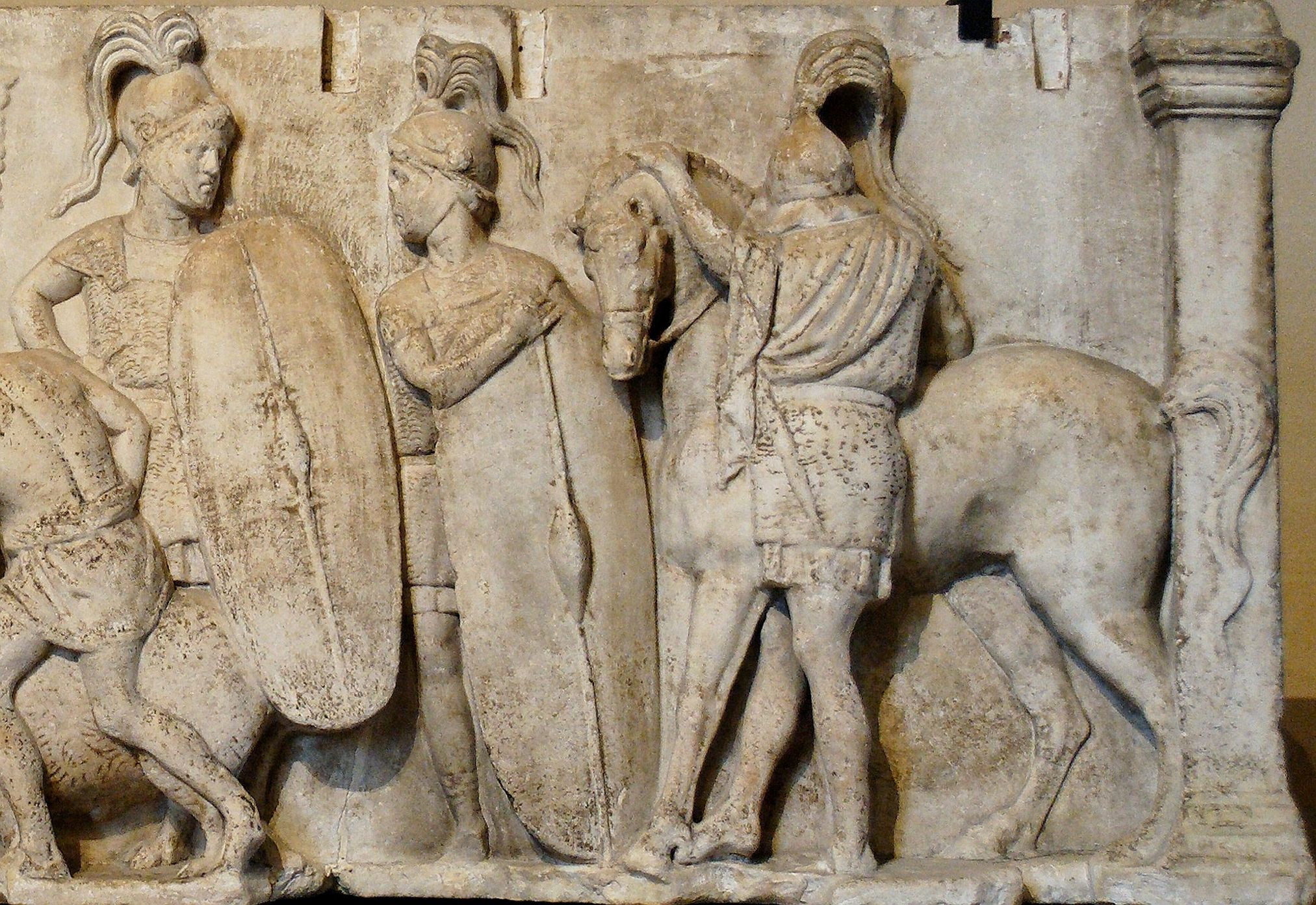
Levy of the army during the taking of the Roman census, detail from the marble-sculpted Altar of Domitius Ahenobarbus, 122–115 BC, showing two Polybian-era soldiers (pedites) wearing chain mail and wielding a gladius and scutum, opposite an aristocratic cavalryman (eques)

For the most part, common soldiers seem to have dressed in belted, knee-length tunics for work or leisure. In the northern provinces, the traditionally short sleeved tunic might be replaced by a warmer, long-sleeved version. Soldiers on active duty wore short trousers under a military kilt, sometimes with a leather jerkin or felt padding to cushion their armour, and a triangular scarf tucked in at the neck. For added protection from wind and weather, they could wear the sagum, a heavy-duty cloak also worn by civilians. According to Roman tradition, soldiers had once worn togas to war, hitching them up with what was known as a "Gabine cinch"; but by the mid-Republican era, this was only used for sacrificial rites and a formal declaration of war. Thereafter, citizen-soldiers wore togas only for formal occasions. Cicero's "sagum-wearing" soldiers versus "toga-wearing" civilians are rhetorical and literary trope, referring to a wished-for transition from military might to peaceful, civil authority. When on duty in the city, the Praetorian Guard concealed their weapons beneath their white "civilian" togas.

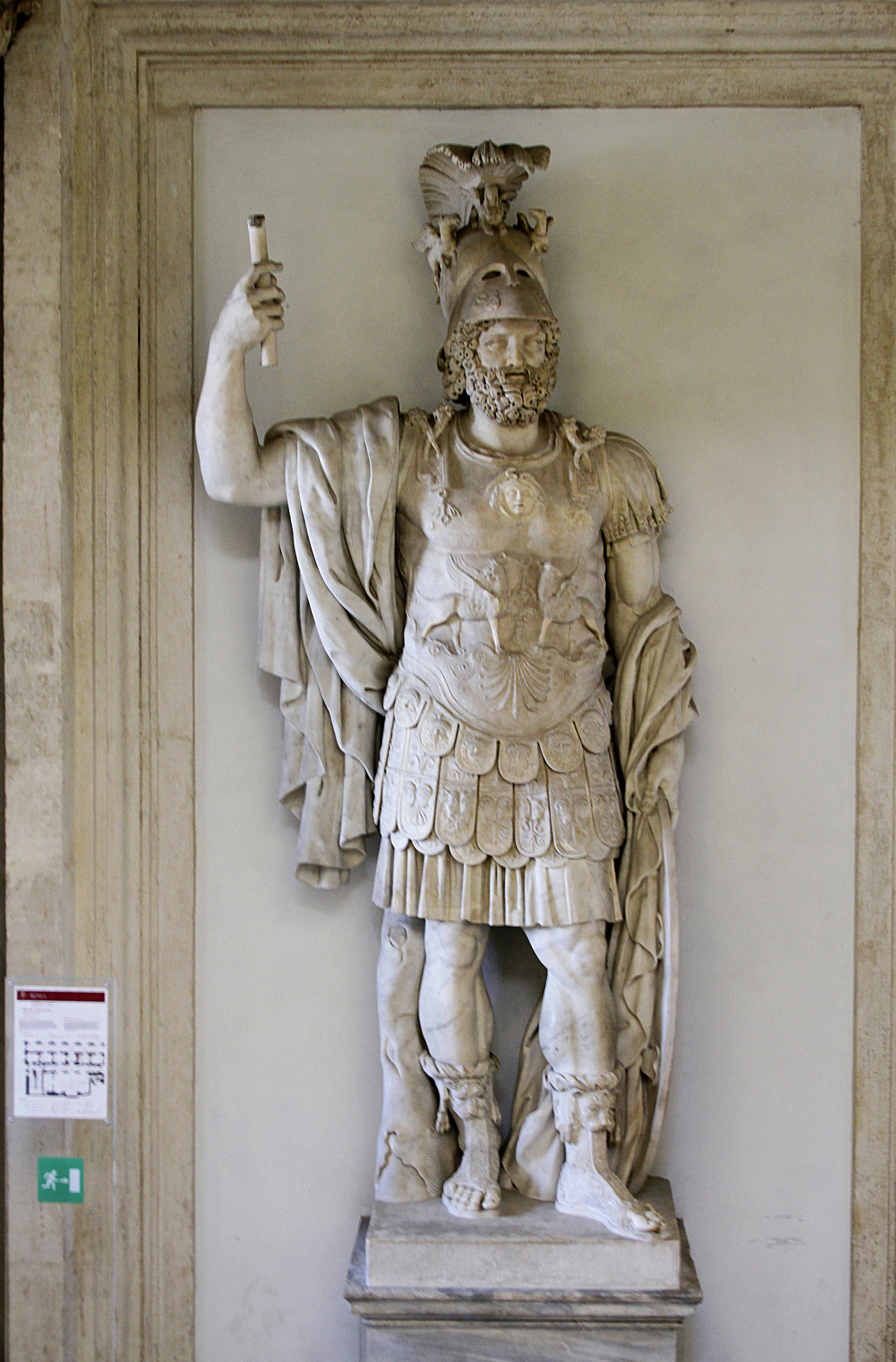
Marble statue of Mars from the Forum of Nerva, wearing a plumed Corinthian helmet and muscle cuirass, 2nd century AD

The sagum distinguished common soldiers from the highest ranking commanders, who wore a larger, purple-red cloak, the paludamentum. The colour of the ranker's sagum is uncertain. Roman military clothing was probably less uniform and more adaptive to local conditions and supplies than is suggested by its idealised depictions in contemporary literature, statuary and monuments. Nevertheless, Rome's levies abroad were supposed to represent Rome in her purest form; provincials were supposed to adopt Roman ways, not vice versa. Even when foreign garments – such as full-length trousers – proved more practical than standard issue, soldiers and commanders who used them were viewed with disdain and alarm by their more conservative compatriots, for undermining Rome's military virtus by "going native". This did not prevent their adoption. In the late 3rd century the distinctive Pannonian "pill-box" hat became firstly a popular, and then a standard item of legionary fatigues.

In Mediterranean climates, soldiers typically wore hobnailed "open boots" (caligae). In colder and wetter climates, an enclosing "shoeboot" was preferred. Some of the Vindolanda tablets mention the despatch of clothing – including cloaks, socks, and warm underwear – by families to their relatives, serving at Brittania's northern frontier.

During the early and middle Republican era, conscripted soldiers and their officers were expected to provide or pay for all their personal equipment. From the late Republic onwards, they were salaried professionals, and bought their own clothing from legionary stores, quartermasters or civilian contractors. Military needs were prioritised. Clothing was expensive to start with, and the military demand was high; this inevitably pushed up prices, and a common soldier's clothing expenses could be more than a third of his annual pay. In the rampant inflation of the later Imperial era, as currency and salaries were devalued, deductions from military salaries for clothing and other staples were replaced by payments in kind, leaving common soldiers cash-poor, but adequately clothed.

== Religious offices and ceremonies ==
Most priesthoods were reserved to high status, male Roman citizens, usually magistrates or ex-magistrates. Most traditional religious rites required that the priest wore a toga praetexta, in a manner described as capite velato (head covered [by a fold of the toga]) when performing augury, reciting prayers or supervising at sacrifices. Where a rite prescribed the free use of both arms, the priest could employ the cinctus Gabinus ("Gabine cinch") to tie back the toga's inconvenient folds.

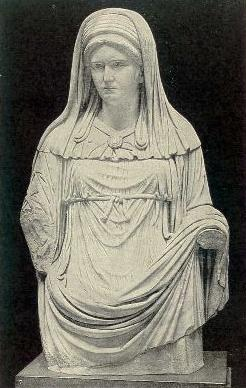
Roman statue of a Virgo Vestalis Maxima (Senior Vestal)

The Vestal Virgins tended Rome's sacred fire, in Vesta's temple, and prepared essential sacrificial materials employed by different cults of the Roman state. They were highly respected, and possessed unique rights and privileges; their persons were sacred and inviolate. Their presence was required at various religious and civil rites and ceremonies. Their costume was predominantly white, woolen, and had elements in common with high-status Roman bridal dress. They wore a white, priestly infula, a white suffibulum (veil) and a white palla, with red ribbons to symbolise their devotion to Vesta's sacred fire, and white ribbons as a mark of their purity.

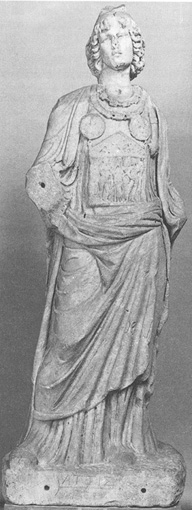
Statue of a Gallus priest, 2nd century, Musei Capitolini

The Flamen priesthood was dedicated to various deities of the Roman state. They wore a close-fitting, rounded cap (apex) topped with a spike of olive-wood; and the laena, a long, semi-circular "flame-coloured" cloak fastened at the shoulder with a brooch or fibula. Their senior was the Flamen Dialis, who was the high priest of Jupiter and was married to the Flaminica Dialis. He was not allowed to divorce, leave the city, ride a horse, touch iron, or see a corpse. The laena was thought to predate the toga. The twelve Salii ("leaping priests" of Mars) were young patrician men, who processed through the city in a form of war-dance during the festival of Mars, singing the Carmen Saliare. They too wore the apex, but otherwise dressed as archaic warriors, in embroidered tunics and breastplates. Each carried a sword, wore a short, red military cloak (paludamentum) and ritually struck a bronze shield, whose ancient original was said to have fallen from heaven.

Rome recruited many non-native deities, cults and priesthoods as protectors and allies of the state. Aesculapius, Apollo, Ceres and Proserpina were worshipped using the so-called "Greek rite", which employed Greek priestly dress, or a Romanised version of it. The priest presided in Greek fashion, with his head bare or wreathed.

In 204 BC, the Galli priesthood were brought to Rome from Phrygia, to serve the "Trojan" Mother Goddess Cybele and her consort Attis on behalf of the Roman state. They were legally protected but considered flamboyantly "un-Roman". They were eunuchs, and told fortunes for money; their public rites were wild, frenzied and bloody, and their priestly garb was "womanly". They wore long, flowing robes of yellow silk, extravagant jewellery, perfume and make-up, and turbans or exotic versions of the "Phrygian" hat over long, bleached hair.

== Roman clothing of late antiquity ==
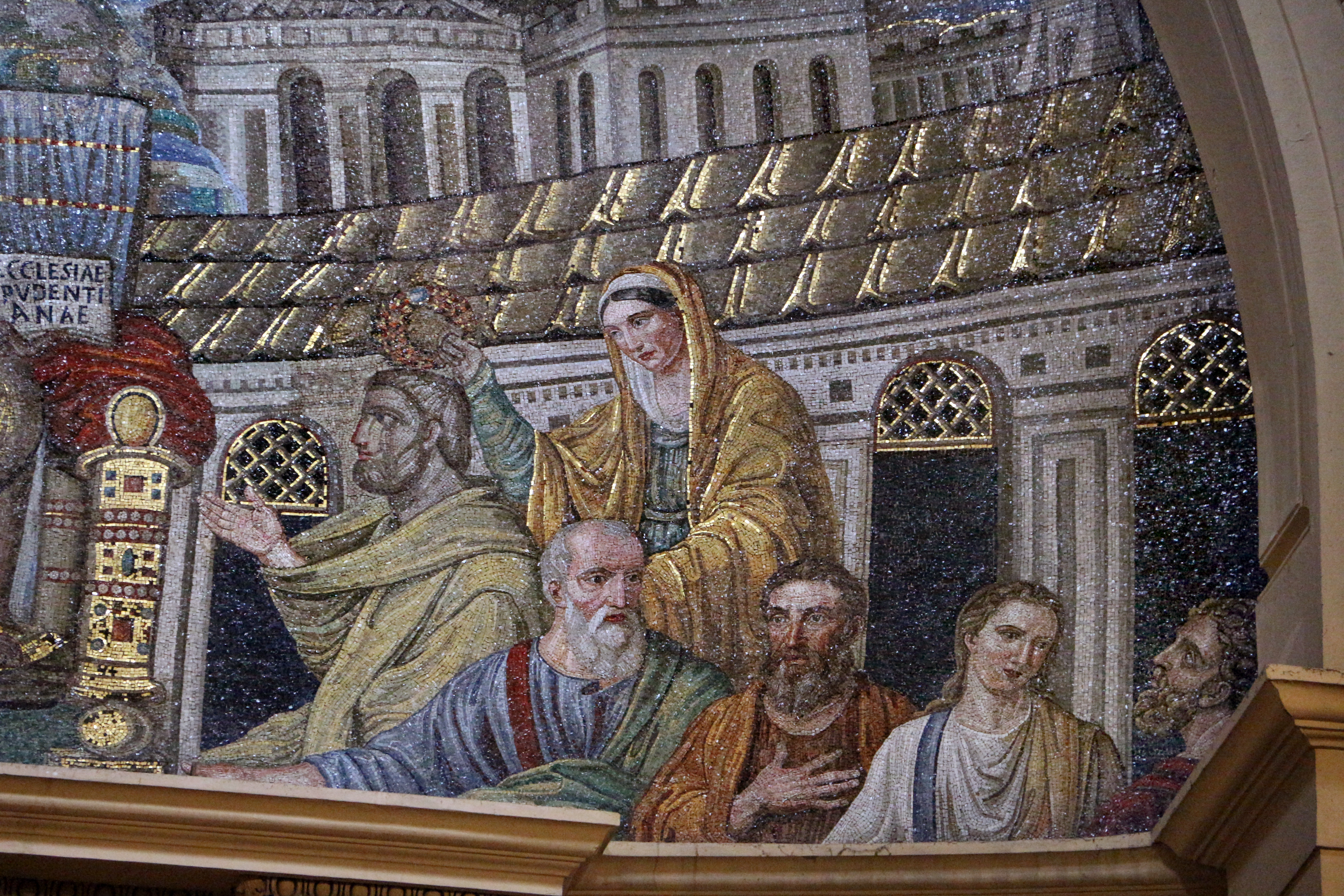
Detail of a Paleochristian Roman mosaic from the basilica of Santa Pudenziana in Rome, c. 410 AD, depicting Saint Pudentiana

Roman fashions underwent very gradual change from the late Republic to the end of the Western Empire, 600 years later. In part, this reflects the expansion of Rome's empire, and the adoption of provincial fashions perceived as attractively exotic, or simply more practical than traditional forms of dress. Changes in fashion also reflect the increasing dominance of a military elite within government, and a corresponding reduction in the value and status of traditional civil offices and ranks.

In the later empire after Diocletian's reforms, clothing worn became highly decorated, with woven or embellished strips, clavi, and circular roundels, orbiculi, added to tunics and cloaks. These decorative elements usually comprised geometrical patterns and stylised plant motifs, but could include human or animal figures. The use of silk also increased steadily and most courtiers in late antiquity wore elaborate silk robes. Heavy military-style belts were worn by bureaucrats as well as soldiers, revealing the general militarization of late Roman government. Trousers – initially considered barbarous garments worn by Germans and Persians - were adopted in Rome by the reign of Diocletian, who introduced standardised wages for trouser makers in his 301 Edict on Maximum Prices. Conservatives saw their use as a sign of cultural decay, and Honorius attempted to ban them in the city in 397.

The toga, traditionally seen as the sign of true Romanitas, had never been popular or practical. Most likely, its official replacement in the East by the more comfortable pallium and paenula simply acknowledged its disuse. In early medieval Europe, kings and aristocrats dressed like the late Roman generals they sought to emulate, not like the older toga-clad senatorial tradition.

== Fabrics ==
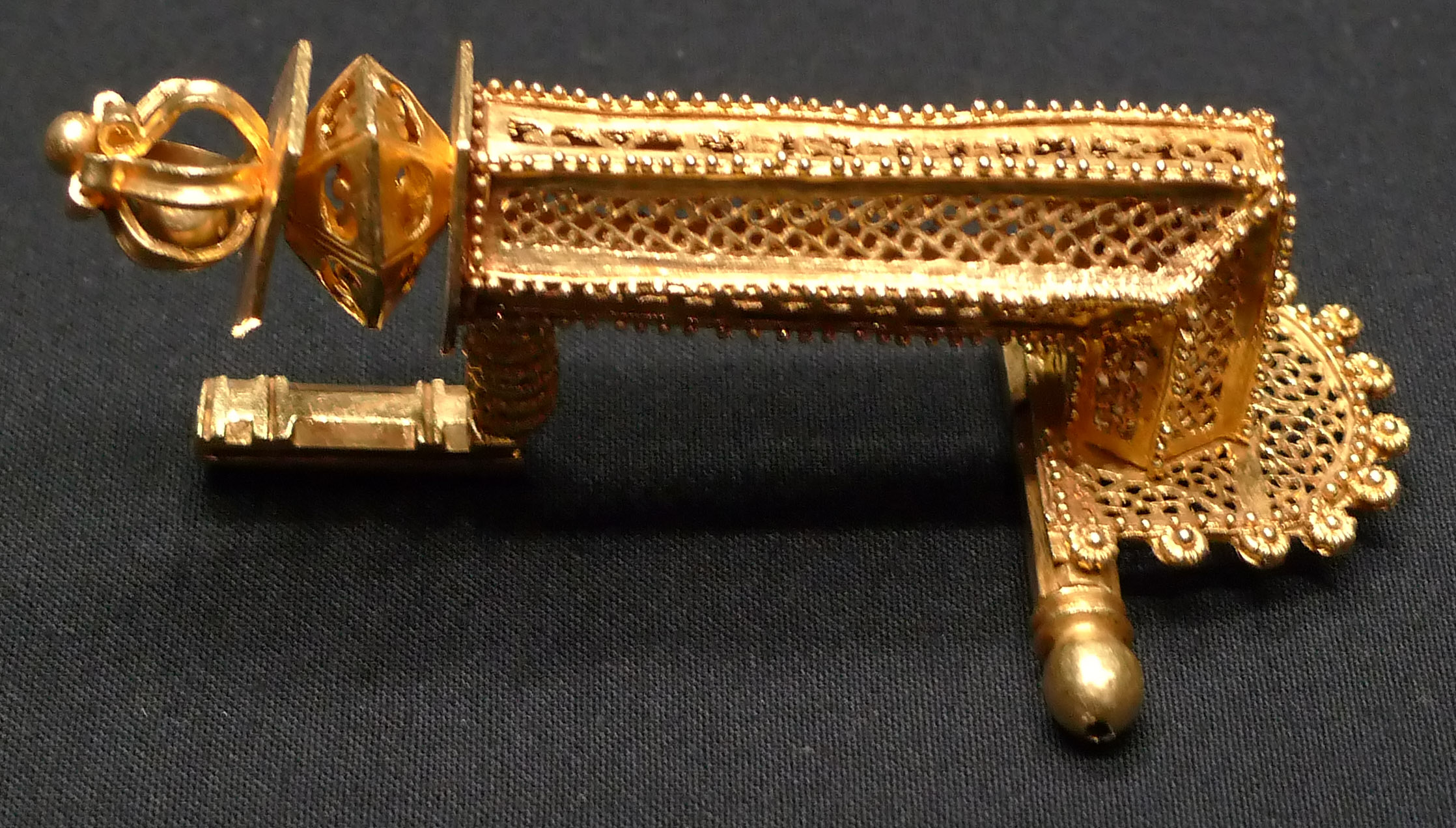
An elaborately designed golden fibula (brooch) with the Latin inscription "VTERE FELIX" ("use [this] with luck"), late 3rd century AD, from the Osztropataka Vandal burial site

=== Animal fibres ===
==== Wool ====
Wool was the most commonly used fibre in Roman clothing. The sheep of Tarentum were renowned for the quality of their wool, although the Romans never ceased trying to optimise the quality of wool through cross-breeding. Miletus in Asia Minor and the province of Gallia Belgica were also renowned for the quality of their wool exports, the latter producing a heavy, rough wool suitable for winter. For most garments, white wool was preferred; it could then be further bleached, or dyed. Naturally dark wool was used for the toga pulla and work garments subjected to dirt and stains.

In the provinces, private landowners and the State held large tracts of grazing land, where large numbers of sheep were raised and sheared. Their wool was processed and woven in dedicated manufactories. Britannia was noted for its woolen products, which included a kind of duffel coat (the birrus brittanicus), fine carpets, and felt linings for army helmets.

==== Silk ====
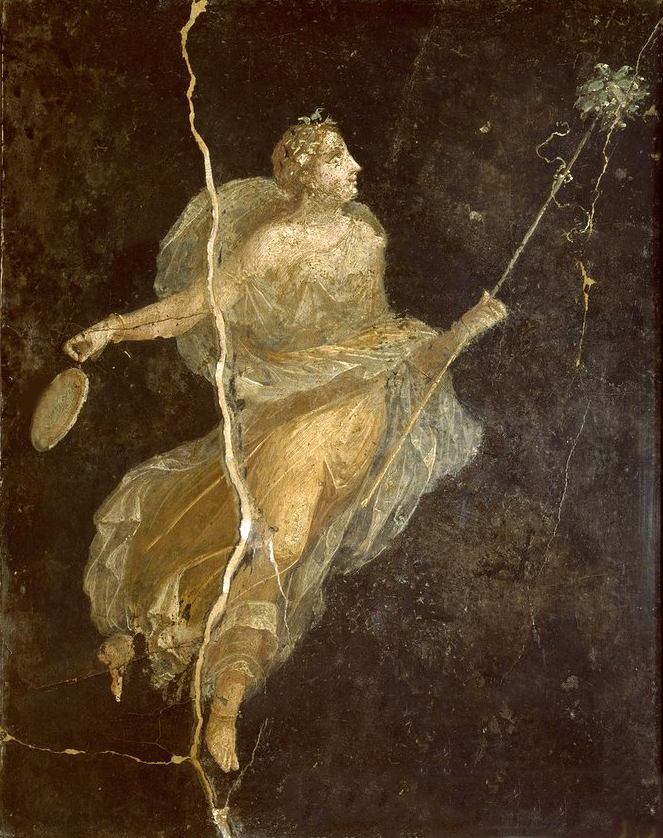
A maenad wearing a silk gown, a Roman fresco from the Casa del Naviglio in Pompeii, 1st century AD

Silk from China was imported in significant quantities as early as the 3rd century BC. It was bought in its raw state by Roman traders at the Phoenician ports of Tyre and Berytus, then woven and dyed. As Roman weaving techniques developed, silk yarn was used to make geometrically or freely figured damask, tabbies and tapestry. Some of these silk fabrics were extremely fine – around 50 threads or more per centimeter. Production of such highly decorative, costly fabrics seems to have been a speciality of weavers in the eastern Roman provinces, where the earliest Roman horizontal looms were developed.

Various sumptuary laws and price controls were passed to limit the purchase and use of silk. In the early Empire the Senate passed legislation forbidding the wearing of silk by men because it was viewed as effeminate but there was also a connotation of immorality or immodesty attached to women who wore the material, as illustrated by Seneca the Elder:

I can see clothes of silk, if materials that do not hide the body, nor even one's decency, can be called clothes... Wretched flocks of maids labour so that the adulteress may be visible through her thin dress, so that her husband has no more acquaintance than any outsider or foreigner with his wife's body. (Declamations Vol. 1)

The Emperor Aurelian is said to have forbidden his wife to buy a mantle of Tyrian purple silk. The Historia Augusta claims that the emperor Elagabalus was the first Roman to wear garments of pure silk (holoserica) as opposed to the usual silk/cotton blends (subserica); this is presented as further evidence of his notorious decadence. Moral dimensions aside, Roman importation and expenditure on silk represented a significant, inflationary drain on Rome's gold and silver coinage, to the benefit of foreign traders and loss to the empire. Diocletian's Edict on Maximum Prices of 301 AD set the price of one kilo of raw silk at 4,000 gold coins.

Wild silk, cocoons collected from the wild after the insect had eaten its way out, was also known; being of shorter, smaller lengths, its fibres had to be spun into somewhat thicker yarn than the cultivated variety. A rare luxury cloth with a beautiful golden sheen, known as sea silk, was made from the long silky filaments or byssus produced by Pinna nobilis, a large Mediterranean clam.

=== Plant fibres ===
==== Linen ====
Pliny the Elder describes the production of linen from flax and hemp. After harvesting, the plant stems were retted to loosen the outer layers and internal fibres, stripped, pounded and then smoothed. Following this, the materials were woven. Flax, like wool, came in various speciality grades and qualities. In Pliny's opinion, the whitest (and best) was imported from Spanish Saetabis; at double the price, the strongest and most long-lasting was from Retovium. The whitest and softest was produced in Latium, Falerii and Paelignium. Natural linen was a "greyish brown" that faded to off-white through repeated laundering and exposure to sunlight. It did not readily absorb the dyes in use at the time, and was generally bleached, or used in its raw, undyed state.

==== Other plant fibres ====
Cotton from India was imported through the same Eastern Mediterranean ports that supplied Roman traders with silk and spices. Raw cotton was sometimes used for padding. Once its seeds were removed, cotton could be spun, then woven into a soft, lightweight fabric appropriate for summer use; cotton was more comfortable than wool, less costly than silk, and unlike linen, it could be brightly dyed; for this reason, cotton and linen were sometimes interwoven to produce vividly coloured, soft but tough fabric. High quality fabrics were also woven from nettle stems; poppy-stem fibre was sometimes interwoven with flax, to produce a glossy smooth, lightweight and luxuriant fabric. Preparation of such stem fibres involved similar techniques to those used for linen.

== Manufacture ==
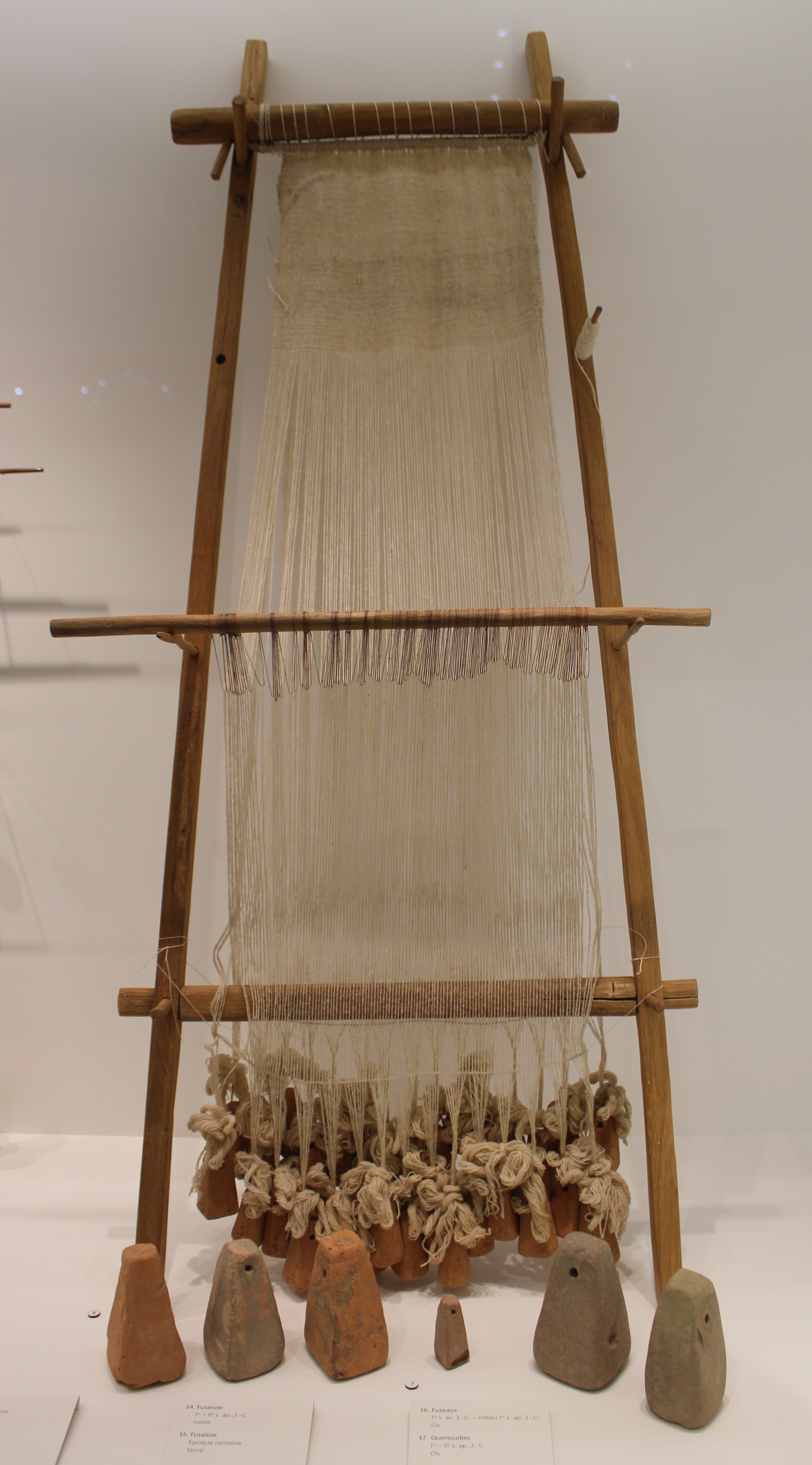
Terracotta loom scales from the Roman period, and a modern reconstruction of an ancient loom. Museum of Romanity, Nîmes.

Ready-made clothing was available for all classes, at a price; the cost of a new cloak for an ordinary commoner might represent three fifths of their annual subsistence expenses. Clothing was left to heirs and loyal servants in wills, and changed hands as part of marriage settlements. High quality clothing could be hired out to the less-well-off who needed to make a good impression. Clothing was a target in some street robberies, and in thefts from the public baths; it was re-sold and recycled down the social scale, until it fell to rags; even these were useful, and centonarii ("patch-workers") made a living by sewing clothing and other items from recycled fabric patches. Owners of slave-run farms and sheep-flocks were advised that whenever the opportunity arose, female slaves should be fully occupied in the production of homespun woolen cloth; this would likely be good enough for clothing the better class of slave or supervisor.

Self-sufficiency in clothing paid off. The carding, combing, spinning and weaving of wool were part of daily housekeeping for most women. Those of middling or low income could supplement their personal or family income by spinning and selling yarn, or by weaving fabric for sale. In traditionalist, wealthy households, the family's wool-baskets, spindles and looms were positioned in the semi-public reception area (atrium), where the mater familias and her familia could thus demonstrate their industry and frugality; a largely symbolic and moral activity for those of their class, rather than practical necessity. Augustus was particularly proud that his wife and daughter had set the best possible example to other Roman women by spinning and weaving his clothing. High-caste brides were expected to make their own wedding garments, using a traditional vertical loom.

Most fabric and clothing was produced by professionals whose trades, standards and specialities were protected by guilds; these in turn were recognised and regulated by local authorities. Pieces were woven as closely as possible to their intended final shape, with minimal waste, cutting and sewing thereafter. Once a woven piece of fabric was removed from the loom, its loose end-threads were tied off, and left as a decorative fringe, hemmed, or used to add differently coloured "Etruscan style" borders, as in the purple-red border of the toga praetexta, and the vertical coloured stripe of some tunics; a technique known as "tablet weaving". Weaving on an upright, hand-powered loom was a slow process. The earliest evidence for the transition from vertical to more efficient horizontal, foot-powered looms comes from Egypt, around 298 AD. Even then, the lack of mechanical aids in spinning made yarn production a major bottleneck in the manufacture of cloth.

== Colours and dyes ==
From Rome's earliest days, a wide variety of colours and coloured fabrics would have been available; in Roman tradition, the first association of professional dyers dated back to the days of King Numa. Roman dyers would certainly have had access to the same locally produced, usually plant-based dyes as their neighbours on the Italian Peninsula, producing various shades of red, yellow, blue, green, and brown; blacks could be achieved using iron salts and oak gall. Other dyes, or dyed cloths, could have been obtained by trade, or through experimentation. For the very few who could afford it, cloth-of-gold (lamé) was almost certainly available, possibly as early as the 7th century BC.

Throughout the Regal, Republican, and Imperial eras, the fastest, most expensive and sought-after dye was imported Tyrian purple, obtained from the murex. Its hues varied according to processing, the most desirable being a dark "dried-blood" red. Purple had long-standing associations with regality, and with the divine. It was thought to sanctify and protect those who wore it, and was officially reserved for the border of the toga praetexta, and for the solid purple toga picta. Edicts against its wider, more casual use were not particularly successful; it was also used by wealthy women and, somewhat more disreputably, by some men. Verres is reported as wearing a purple pallium at all-night parties, not long before his trial, disgrace and exile for corruption. For those who could not afford genuine Tyrian purple, counterfeits were available. The expansion of trade networks during the early Imperial era brought the dark blue of Indian indigo to Rome; though desirable and costly in itself, it also served as a base for fake Tyrian purple.

For red hues, madder was one of the cheapest dyes available. Saffron yellow was much admired, but costly. It was a deep, bright and fiery yellow-orange, and was associated with purity and constancy. It was used for the flammeum (meaning "flame-coloured"), a veil used by Roman brides and the Flaminica Dialis, who was virgin at marriage and forbidden to divorce.

Specific colours were associated with chariot-racing teams and their supporters. The oldest of these were the Reds and the Whites. During the later Imperial era, the Blues and Greens dominated chariot-racing and, up to a point, civil and political life in Rome and Constantinople. Although the teams and their supporters had official recognition, their rivalry sometimes spilled into civil violence and riot, both within and beyond the circus venue.

== Leather and hide ==
The Romans had two methods of converting animal skins to leather: tanning produced a soft, supple brown leather; tawing in alum and salt produced a soft, pale leather that readily absorbed dyes. Both these processes produced a strong, unpleasant odour, so tanners' and tawers' shops were usually placed well away from urban centres. Unprocessed animal hides were supplied directly to tanners by butchers, as a byproduct of meat production; some was turned to rawhide, which made a durable shoe-sole. Landowners and livestock ranchers, many of whom were of the elite class, drew a proportion of profits at each step of the process that turned their animals into leather or hide and distributed it through empire-wide trade networks. The Roman military consumed large quantities of leather; for jerkins, belts, boots, saddles, harness and strap-work, but mostly for military tents.

== Laundering and fulling ==
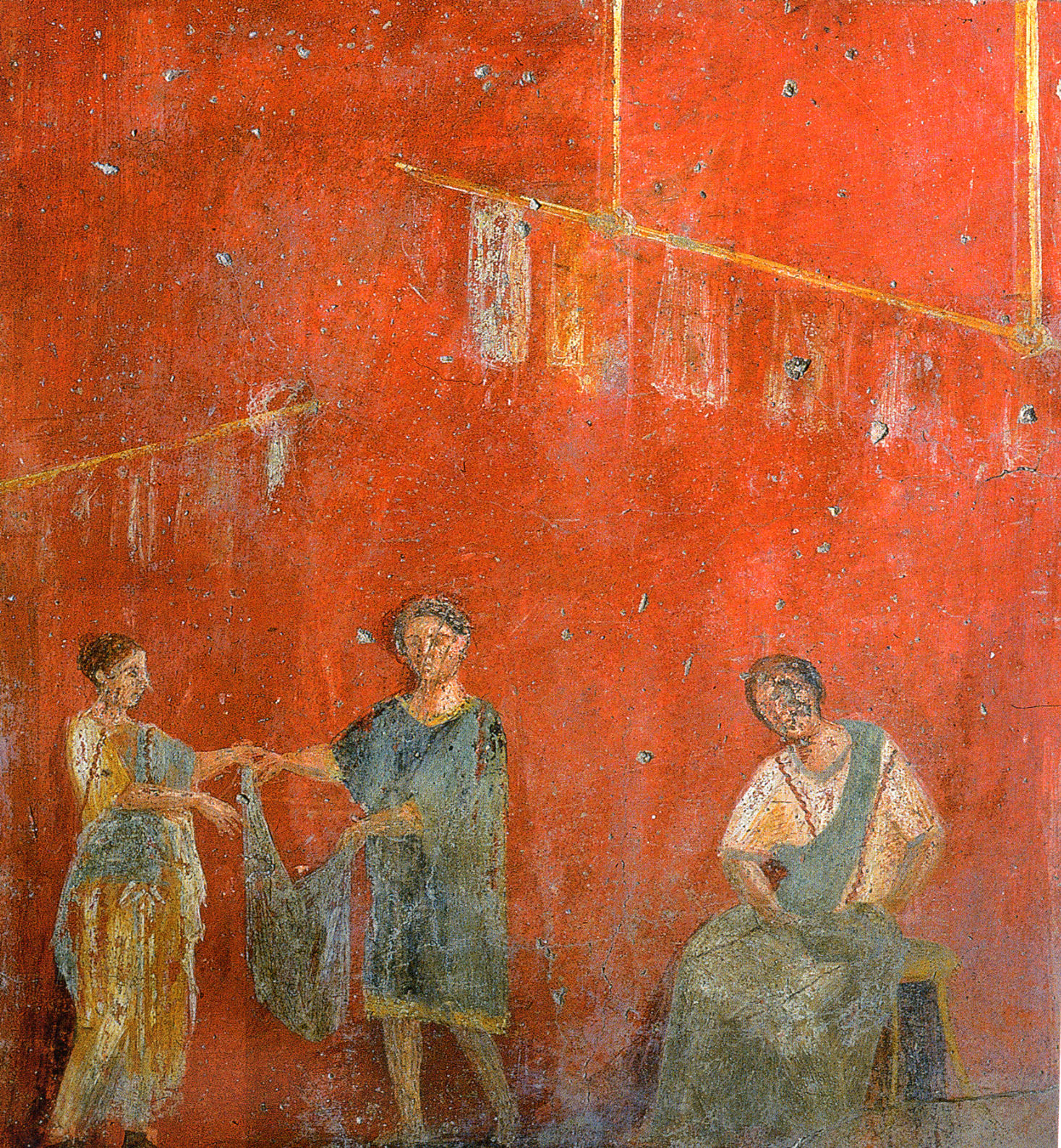
Workers hanging up clothing to dry, wall painting from a fuller's shop (fullonica) at Pompeii

The almost universal habit of public bathing ensured that most Romans kept their bodies at least visually clean, but dirt, spillage, staining and sheer wear of garments were constant hazards to the smart, clean appearance valued by both the elite and non-elite leisured classes, particularly in an urban setting. Most Romans lived in apartment blocks with no facilities for washing or finishing clothes on any but the smallest scale. Professional laundries and fuller's shops (fullonicae, singular fullonica) were highly malodorous but essential and commonplace features of every city and town. Small fulling enterprises could be found at local market-places; others operated on an industrial scale, and would have required a considerable investment of money and manpower, especially slaves.

Basic laundering and fulling techniques were simple, and labour-intensive. Garments were placed in large tubs containing aged urine, then well trodden by bare-footed workers. They were well-rinsed, manually or mechanically wrung, and spread over wicker frames to dry. Whites could be further brightened by bleaching with sulphur fumes. Some colours could be restored to brightness by "polishing" or "refinishing" with Cimolian earth (the basic fulling process). Others were less colour-fast, and would have required separate laundering. In the best-equipped establishments, garments were further smoothed under pressure, using screw-presses and stretching frames. Laundering and fulling were punishingly harsh to fabrics, but were evidently thought to be worth the effort and cost. The high-quality woolen togas of the senatorial class were intensively laundered to an exceptional, snowy white, using the best and most expensive ingredients. Lower ranking citizens used togas of duller wool, more cheaply laundered; for reasons that remain unclear, the clothing of different status groups might have been laundered separately.

Front of house, fullonicae were run by enterprising citizens of lower social class, or by freedmen and freedwomen; behind the scenes, their enterprise might be supported discreetly by a rich or elite patron, in return for a share of the profits. The Roman elite seem to have despised the fulling and laundering professions as ignoble; though perhaps no more than they despised all manual trades. The fullers themselves evidently thought theirs a respectable and highly profitable profession, worth celebration and illustration in murals and memorials. Pompeian mural paintings of launderers and fullers at work show garments in a rainbow variety of colours, but not white; fullers seem to have been particularly valued for their ability to launder dyed garments without loss of colour, sheen or "brightness", rather than merely whitening, or bleaching. New woolen cloth and clothing may also have been laundered; the process would have partially felted and strengthened woolen fabrics, and raised the softer nap.

== See also ==
- Biblical clothing
- Byzantine dress
- Clothing in ancient Greece
- Clothing in the ancient world
- Roman hairstyles

== Cited sources ==
- Croom, Alexandra (2010). Roman Clothing and Fashion. The Hill, Stroud, Gloucestershire: Amberley Publishing. ISBN 978-1-84868-977-0.
- Edmondson, J.C.; Keith, Alison, eds. (2008). Roman Dress and the Fabrics of Roman Culture. University of Toronto Press. ISBN 9780802093196.
- Erdkamp, Paul, ed. (2007). A Companion to the Roman Army. Blackwell Publishing. ISBN 978-1444339215.
- Flohr, Miko (2013). The World of the Fullo: Work, Economy, and Society in Roman Italy. Oxford University Press. ISBN 978-0199659357.
- Flower, Harriet I. (2004). The Cambridge Companion to the Roman Republic. Cambridge University Press. ISBN 978-0-521-00390-2.
- Phang, Sar Elise (2008). Roman Military Service: Ideologies of Discipline in the Late Republic and Early Principate. Cambridge University Press. ISBN 9781139468886.
- Radicke, Jan (2022). Roman Women's Dress. De Gruyter. ISBN 978-3-11-071155-4
- Rodgers, Nigel (2007). The Illustrated Encyclopedia of the Roman Empire. Lorenz Books. ISBN 978-0-7548-1911-0.
- Sebesta, Judith Lynn; Bonfante, Larissa, eds. (1994). The World of Roman Costume: Wisconsin Studies in Classics. The University of Wisconsin Press. ISBN 9780299138509.
- Vout, Caroline (1996). "The Myth of the Toga: Understanding the History of Roman Dress". Greece & Rome. 43 (2): 204–220. doi:10.1093/gr/43.2.204. JSTOR 643096.
