= Stola =

Traditional garment of Ancient Roman women

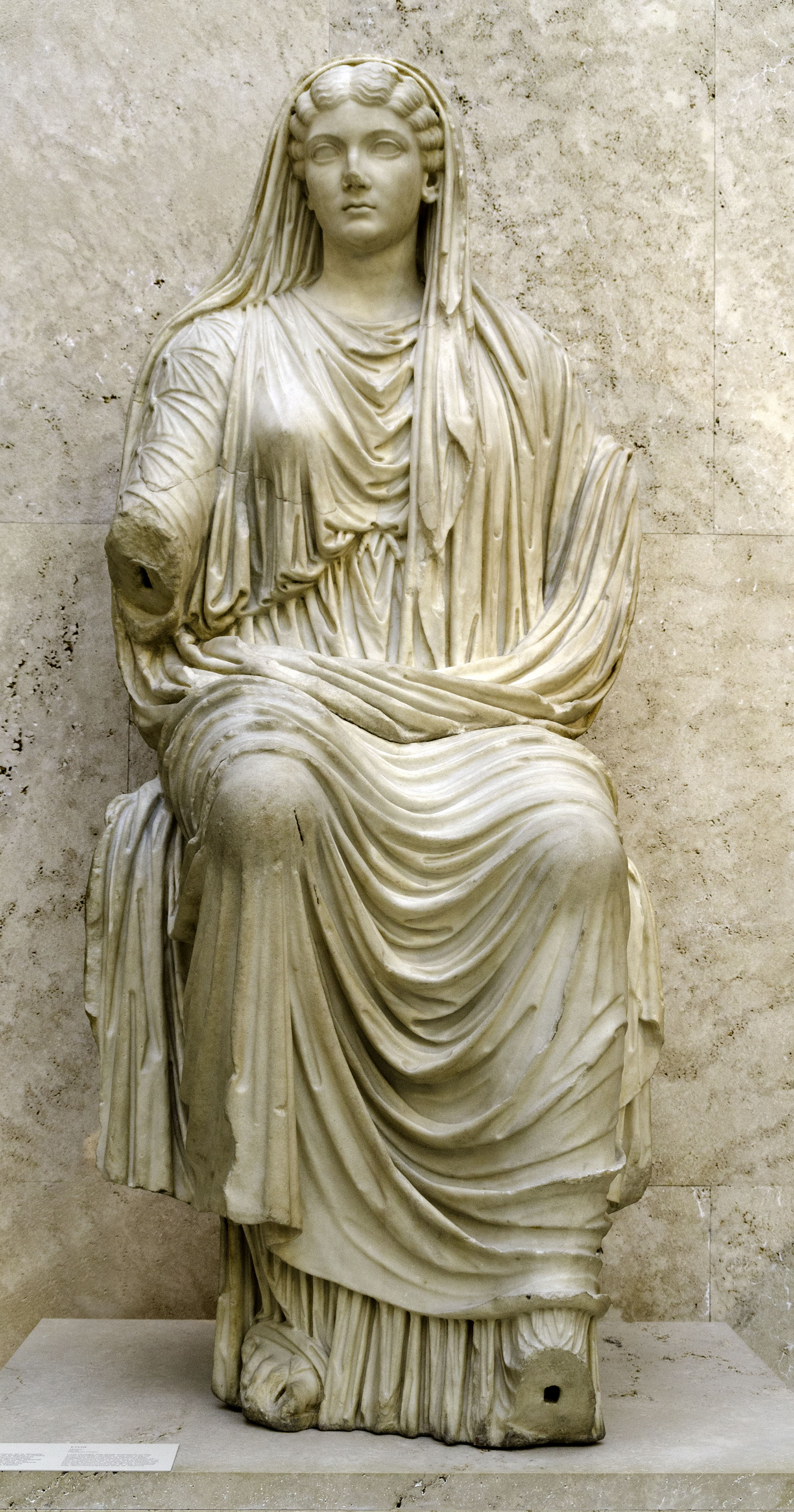
Statue of Livia Drusilla wearing a stola and palla

The stola (Classical Latin: [ˈst̪ɔ.ɫ̪a]) (pl. stolae) was the traditional garment of Roman women, corresponding to the toga that was worn by men. It was also called vestis longa in Latin literary sources, pointing to its length.

== History ==
The stola was a staple of fashion in ancient Rome spanning from the early Roman Republic until the beginning of the 2nd century CE. The garment was first identified on statues by Margarete Bieber. The first evidence of the stola/vestis longa dates to the 3rd century BCE, but the form of the garment is common in the Mediterranean world and so it must be much older. In Republican times, it was simply part of Roman female dress practice. In Augustan times, when it was used much less, the stola was taken up by Imperial cultural policy and was turned – like the vitta (plaited headband) – into a dress insigne of married Roman women. It may even have been a legal privilege. By this time, it was worn only by women of the social elite. At the beginning of the 2nd century CE, the stola fell completely out of use. However, the term matrona stolata, referring to married women of equestrian rank, remained a technical term in inscriptions.

A well-known image of the stola is the one worn by the Statue of Liberty in New York City.

=== Social conventions ===
It has long been believed that Roman women originally did not wear stolae and that they instead wore togas like the men. However, this goes back to a scholarly lore invented in Late Antiquity. For the most part, the toga was worn exclusively by men, and Roman wives (matronae) traditionally wore the stola. In Latin literature, wearing the male toga was associated with prostitution and adultery. In Roman life, the only Roman women who wore a toga were unfree prostitutes (referred to as meretrices or ancillae) who worked in the streets and in brothels. A Roman matron convicted of adultery (moecha damnata) did not actually have to wear a toga in public from then on. She was only symbolically called a togata (a woman in toga) since she was unfit to be a matron (as epitomized by the stola). Female and male citizen children could wear a toga praetexta (a toga with purple border), but this usage should be kept apart from wearing the toga as an adult.

== Description ==
The stola was a long, pleated, sleeveless robe that could be worn by Roman wives (matronae). It was worn as a symbol and represented a woman's marital status, and it was also worn by the Roman Vestal priestesses. There are no physical remains of any stola. The matron’s stola usually served as an intermediate garment and was worn over the undertunic (subucula) and under the cloak (pallium). It looked like a ‘peplos’ and had longitudinal folds (rugae). There are no explicit literary sources as to its upper opening, but there is archaeological evidence. This shows that, in Augustan times, the sleeveless garment was fastened by significant shoulder straps (analeptrides). It also had a visible lower border, called instita (or in non-technical language a limbus). The fabrics used for stolae were presumably linen or wool, but a wealthy woman might have also used silk.

=== Varieties ===
The matronal stola had no fixed colour. The stola of the Vestal virgins was presumably white. The border (instita) was probably usually in purple colour (similar to the purple border on an expensive toga).

== See also ==
- Clothing in ancient Rome
- Olicula
- Palla (garment)
- Stole (vestment)

== Sources ==
- Mekacher, Nina (2006). Die vestalischen Jungfrauen in der römischen Kaiserzeit (in German). Wiesbaden: Reichert. ISBN 978-3-89500-499-5. OCLC 78203585.
- Radicke, Jan (2022). Roman women's dress : literary sources, terminology, and historical development. Berlin. ISBN 978-3-11-071155-4. OCLC 1346261306.
- Scholz, Birgit Ingrid (1992). Untersuchungen zur Tracht der römischen matrona (in German). Köln: Böhlau. ISBN 3-412-01491-5. OCLC 27443395.
- Sebesta, Judith Lynn; Bonfante, Larissa (1994). The world of Roman costume. Madison, Wis.: University of Wisconsin Press. ISBN 0-299-13850-X. OCLC 27810161.
