= Olicula =

Short hooded cape

An olicula is a short hooded cape that could be worn by women over a stola for warmth.
