= Sylvester Croom =

American football player and coach (born 1954)

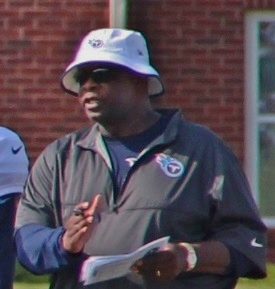
- Croom at Tennessee Titans training camp in 2014

No. 51
- Position: Center

Personal information
- Born: September 25, 1954 (age 72); Tuscaloosa, Alabama, U.S.
- Listed height: 6 ft 0 in (1.83 m)
- Listed weight: 235 lb (107 kg)

Career information
- High school: Tuscaloosa
- College: Alabama (1972–1974)
- NFL draft: 1975: undrafted

Career history

Playing
- New Orleans Saints (1975)

Coaching
- Alabama (1976–1986); Graduate assistant (1976); Inside linebackers coach (1977–1981); Outside linebackers coach (1982–1983); Inside linebackers coach (1984–1986); Tampa Bay Buccaneers (1987–1990) Running backs coach; Indianapolis Colts (1991) Running backs coach; San Diego Chargers (1992–1996) Running backs coach; Detroit Lions (1997–2000) Offensive coordinator; Green Bay Packers (2001–2003) Running backs coach; Mississippi State (2004–2008) Head coach; St. Louis Rams (2009–2011) Running backs coach; Jacksonville Jaguars (2012) Running backs coach; Tennessee Titans (2013–2016) Running backs coach

Awards and highlights
- As player: National champion (1973); First-team All-American (1974); Jacobs Blocking Trophy (1974); First-team All-SEC (1974); As coach: SEC Coach of the Year (2007); Liberty Mutual Fan Coach of the Year (2007)

Head coaching record
- Career: NCAA: 21–38 (.356)
- Coaching profile at Pro Football Reference
- Stats at Pro Football Reference
- College Football Hall of Fame

Sylvester Croom Jr. (born September 25, 1954) is an American former football player and coach. He was the head coach at Mississippi State University from 2004 to 2008, and the first African American head football coach in the Southeastern Conference. His father, Sylvester Croom Sr., was himself an All-American football player at Alabama A&M, later the team chaplain at the University of Alabama, and has been recognized by that school as one of the state's 40 pioneers of civil rights. After his time at Mississippi State, Croom Jr. served as running backs coach for three teams in the National Football League (NFL).

== Playing career ==
Croom, a native of Tuscaloosa, Alabama, starred at Tuscaloosa High School as a linebacker and tight end. He was named Outstanding Player his senior year (1971). He then played those same positions before settling in at center for Paul "Bear" Bryant at the University of Alabama, where in 1974 he was a senior captain, earned the Jacobs Blocking Trophy, and like his father years earlier earned Kodak All-American honors. During his playing career there, Alabama garnered three SEC championships from 1972 to 1974 and a national title in 1973. Croom went 32-4 with Alabama, who only lost one regular season game in that span. He was inducted into the College Football Hall of Fame in 2022.

He played one season in the NFL for the New Orleans Saints before returning to the University of Alabama to begin his coaching career.

== Coaching career ==
Before coaching at Mississippi State, Croom was an assistant at Alabama for 11 seasons under Bryant and Ray Perkins, one as a graduate assistant coach and ten more variably as inside and outside linebackers coach. During this eleven-year period on the Alabama staff Croom participated in ten bowl games, two national championships in 1978 and 1979, and he coached four eventual NFL first-round draft picks, including Cornelius Bennett and Derrick Thomas.

He then spent 17 years in the professional ranks as running backs coach at Tampa Bay, Indianapolis, San Diego, and Green Bay. Before going to Green Bay, he served as offensive coordinator for Detroit from 1997 to 2000, and during his tenure in San Diego was on the Chargers' staff for Super Bowl XXIX.

He was a finalist for the head coach position at the University of Alabama in 2003, but the job ultimately went to Mike Shula. In March 2004, Alabama's Sylvester Croom Commitment to Excellence Award, given annually for 16 years to outstanding players, was changed to the Bart Starr, supposedly because Shula did not want an award named for a rival coach. After complaints by alumni and fans, the award was changed back to its original name.

When Croom was hired at Mississippi State, he inherited a program that was riddled with NCAA sanctions and had not won consistently since the 1990s. Not just that, but Croom became the first African American in Southeastern Conference history to be given a chance to head coach a football team.

After the 2007 season, during which his team won eight games, including the Liberty Bowl, Croom garnered Coach of the Year awards from three organizations. On December 4, 2007, Croom was named coach of the year by the American Football Coaches Association for region two. The AFCA has five regional coaches of the year and announces a national coach of the year each January. That same year, on December 5, Croom was named SEC Coach of the Year twice, once as voted by the other SEC coaches and once as voted by The Associated Press. It was the first time a Mississippi State coach received the AP honor since Charley Shira in 1970 and the first time a Mississippi State coach received the coaches award since Wade Walker in 1957.

After a 4–8 record in 2008, culminating with a 45–0 loss to rival Mississippi, Croom was asked by school officials to resign as the coach of the Bulldogs.

On February 2, 2009, St. Louis Rams head coach Steve Spagnuolo announced that he hired Croom to his coaching staff to be the team's running backs coach. Croom and the entire coaching staff were fired following the 2011 season in which the team posted a 2–14 record.

Croom was hired onto Tennessee Titans head coach Mike Munchak's staff as running backs coach in 2013. Croom was not retained by new head coach Mike Vrabel in 2018, and decided to retire after more than 40 years of coaching.

== Education ==
Croom earned a Bachelor of Arts degree in history with a minor in biology from the University of Alabama in 1975 at the age of twenty and while a graduate student and coach there earned a master's degree in educational administration in 1977.

== First black head football coach in the SEC ==
=== Responses ===
Croom has consistently downplayed the personal significance of his status as the first black head coach of an SEC football team. A characteristic response has been that while he is proud of his African-American heritage, the most important part for him is "the head coach part" and the ability to pursue a dream he has held for all of his adult life, stating notably at a press conference upon his acceptance of the position "I am the first African-American coach in the SEC, but there ain't but one color that matters here, and that color is maroon." Elsewhere, in an interview shortly before his first season as a head coach, when asked if as the first African-American coach in the SEC he considered himself "a trailblazer," Croom responded "I'm just a guy trying to do the best job he can. It just happens that the timing of my hiring puts me in that position. I don't see myself that way. If other people perceive that, so be it. I'm just trying to do the best I can here."

However, the initial response to his hiring was lauded by many as a moment of relative cultural significance. An article published in USA Today on the day that Croom was hired listed a few responses from members of the political, cultural, and athletic communities. In it Julian Bond, chairman of the NAACP, noting that the hire was in Mississippi, a state often regarded as having the poorest civil rights record, said that "For Mississippi State to place the fortunes of its team in black hands is more than welcome, however long it has taken." In the same article Bennie Thompson, the lone black member of Mississippi's U.S. congressional delegation, said that the hiring "speaks well of Mississippi State. Mississippi State alumni and friends are more concerned about winning than the color of the coach. There's still a lot of work to be done by other schools."

On February 12, 2007, in observance of Black History Month President George W. Bush, at a gathering of African-American leaders and dignitaries where Croom was present, recognized the efforts and achievements of NFL football coaches Tony Dungy and Lovie Smith, both acquaintances of Croom and a friend in Dungy's case. The president went on to state that he was "proud to be [there] with another football coach who deserves a lot of credit, Sylvester Croom, who is the head football coach from Mississippi State University. His achievement is the first African American coach in the Southeastern Football League -- Southeastern Conference. He was picked because he's a strong leader and a fine man. And I thank you for blazing trails."

In February 2008 Croom was featured in a half-hour segment of "Say it Loud," ESPN's documentary celebration of Black History Month. In it are featured interviews with Croom along with coaches and players, among others. Relevant to the topic he speaks generally in this documentary on his decision to accept Mississippi State's offer for the head coaching position and on his race and the history of race relations in the region being major contributing factors.

Likewise, in a 2009 interview focusing on his work with the St. Louis Rams, Croom spoke to his relevance to racial and cultural integration, saying "It's just worked out in my career where I've had that opportunity to be the first African-American in a lot of situations." He continued to say that "...it was never anything that was planned. It's just the way this life has gone for me, and the opportunities that I've been blessed with. In retrospect, I do take some pride in it, and some sacrifices that I've had to make along this way. But so does everybody else."

=== Position at Alabama ===
Croom's own position on African-American coaches in college football has not always been so apolitical, however. In an interview with Black Athlete Sports Network in July 2003, after losing out to Mike Shula in the head coach vacancy for the University of Alabama, Croom speculated that race was more of a factor in that hiring process than University of Alabama athletic director Mal Moore let on and that he lost the job because of it. "I have a real problem there," he said. "A lot of those [SEC] schools, guys are good enough to play for them, good enough to be assistant coaches and not good enough to be in the positions of decision making and the positions of high financial reward. And they're qualified." In that same interview with Black Athlete Sports Croom acknowledged that he "had great support from the former players and the fans there and even some people within the administration," but that "Somewhere in the final process, somebody made another decision." His initial impression of the interview with Alabama was that it was fair and was so positive that he considered himself to be the lead candidate afterwards, which was why he was so surprised when the offer was given to Shula, a coach with over ten fewer years of coaching experience. Afterwards the Rev. Jesse Jackson got involved, calling for an investigation into the hiring practices at Alabama and all SEC schools. Croom's response to Jackson's intervention was that "Rev. Jackson did his job. Because quite often, inside the business you can't draw attention to things. He is a voice for a great mass, for a lot of people who don't have a voice." On the question of Croom's timing in his response to this issue being given only after Jackson's call for investigation, he continued by saying that "in this particular case, I felt I could speak for myself. I chose not to say anything at that particular time because there was just too much emotion."

=== Legacy of segregation ===
Elsewhere, Croom has treated his status as the first African-American head football coach in the SEC with the complexity he sees befitting the situation of a person so deeply connected to the American South. In a 2004 interview with The Washington Post Croom said of his situation in Mississippi that "There's much more at stake here than football. The fact that I'm African American, that I'm the State football coach -- well, I think it will have a positive impact on race relations in the state of Mississippi, and how the rest of the country views Mississippi. The place has changed a great deal. I don't know how many people outside here understand that. But they're about to find out."

In a 2003 article for the New York Daily News, Croom recalled his experiences of integration as a middle schooler in Tuscaloosa, the near-lynching of his father years before in a case of mistaken identity, and segregated restrooms, an institution which he said “bothered me [then], and it still does to this day." His younger brother Kelvin Croom, a pastor and high school administrator, added: "We chose not to be intimidated. We chose to be motivated and hoped that one day we would make a difference. And we have made a difference, because the crosses have been taken down and the ropes have been put away."

== Head coaching record ==
Year	Team	Overall	Conference	Standing	Bowl/playoffs
Mississippi State Bulldogs (Southeastern Conference) (2004–2008)
2004	Mississippi State	3–8	2–6	6th (Western)	
2005	Mississippi State	3–8	1–7	T–5th (Western)	
2006	Mississippi State	3–9	1–7	6th (Western)	
2007	Mississippi State	8–5	4–4	T–3rd (Western)	W Liberty
2008	Mississippi State	4–8	2–6	T–4th (Western)	
Mississippi State:		21–38	10–30		
Total:		21–38			
