= Via Livenza Hypogeum =

Archaeological site in Rome, Italy

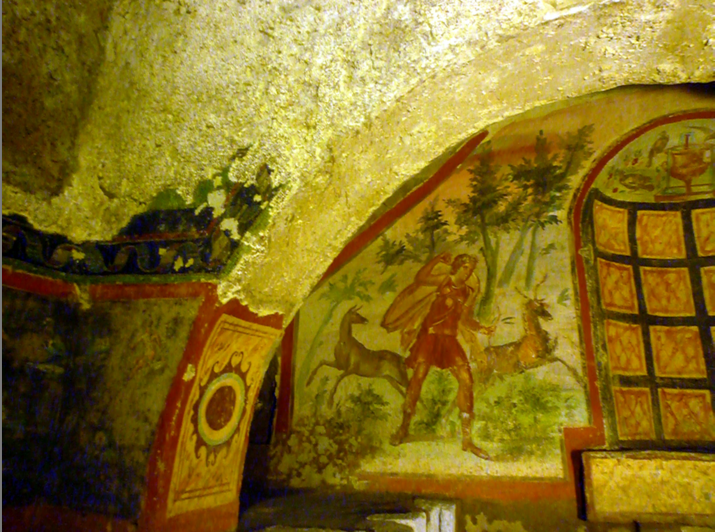

The Via Livenza Hypogeum is an underground structure near present-day via Livenza in Rome to the north of the Quirinal Hill, not far from the Aurelian Wall.

It has an elongated plan similar to a circus and is oriented north-south with side rooms. It was discovered during the modern quarter's construction and much of it has been destroyed by the buildings above, though the surviving remnants allow its interpretation.

Its decoration includes both Christian and pagan subjects and it has been argued that it was either a mystery cult's temple, a Christian baptistery or a nymphaeum linked to an underground spring. It dates to after the second half of the 4th century and its opus listatum work includes a stamp with Constantine I's monogram. The mix of imagery and the wall paintings' classical style suggests the transition between Julian and Theodosius I.

== Bibliography (in Italian) ==
- Filippo Coarelli, Guida archeologica di Roma, Arnoldo Mondadori Editore, Verona 1984.
- Ranuccio Bianchi Bandinelli e Mario Torelli, L'arte dell'antichità classica, Etruria-Roma, Utet, Torino 1976.
- Carlo Pavia, Guida archeologica di Roma, Guida dei Mitrei di Roma, Guida delle catacombe di Roma, Guida di Roma Sotterranea, Gangemi Editore 1998-2000
- "Ipogeo di via Livenza". Sovrintendenza Capitolina ai Beni Culturali.
- "Cronaca della scoperta dell'Ipogeo". Info.roma.it.
