= Sylvester Croom Sr. =

American football player and priest (1926–2000)

Reverend Sylvester Croom Sr. (June 26, 1926 – January 2, 2000) served for years after integration as chaplain for University of Alabama athletes. He was an All-American football player at Alabama A&M. He also later served as a pastor and community leader in Tuscaloosa, Alabama, and has been recognized by the University of Alabama as one of the 40 pioneers of civil rights in the state. He was also a member of Alpha Phi Alpha.

His son, Sylvester Croom Jr., was a successful football player at the University of Alabama under coach Paul "Bear" Bryant, later becoming head coach at Mississippi State University.
