= Alexandra Croom =

British archaeologist and museum curator

Alexandra Croom FSA
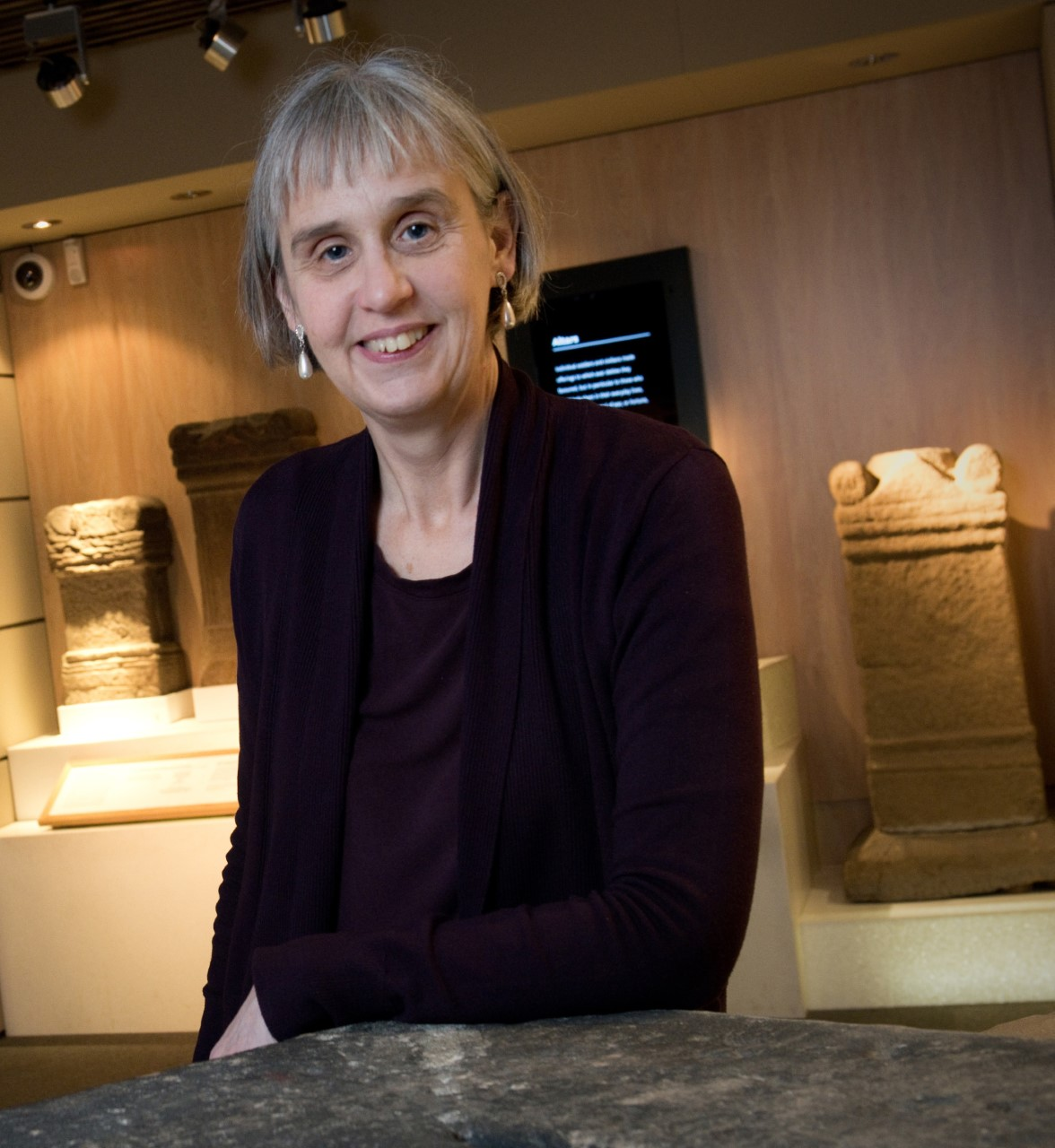
- Alex Croom, in the Stone Gallery at Arbeia, South Shields' Roman Fort, January 2018
- Occupations: Archaeologist; Museum Curator

Academic work
- Discipline: Archaeology
- Sub-discipline: Roman clothing, Roman furniture
- Institutions: Tyne & Wear Archives & Museums

Alexandra T. Croom BA FSA is a British archaeologist and museum curator.

== Career ==
Croom is the Keeper of Archaeology at Tyne & Wear Archives & Museums. She was elected as a Fellow of the Society of Antiquaries of London on 29 April 2010.

=== Exhibitions ===
Croom has been involved in the planning and delivery of several exhibitions for Tyne & Wear Archives & Museum including:

- The Glory of Rome: Arbeia's Greatest Treasures (2014): An exhibition at Arbeia fort.
- Saving Face (2018): An exhibition of a private collections of Roman helmet cheek-pieces.
- Borderline Funny (2019): An exhibition in Segedunum of modern cartoons related to Hadrian's Wall.

== Select publications ==
- Bidwell, P. T., Croom, A., Snape, M. E. 1999. Hardknott Roman Fort, Cumbria : including an account of the excavations by the late Dorothy Charlesworth. Kendal : Cumberland and Westmorland Antiquarian and Archaeological Society
- Croom, A. T. and Griffiths, W. B. (eds) 2002. Re-enactment as Research : Proceedings of the Twelfth International Roman Military Equipment Conference, held at the Customs House, South Shields, UK, 24th-26th September 1999(Journal of Military Equipment Studies 11). Armatura Press.
- Croom, A. 2010. Roman Clothing and Fashion. Stroud, Amberley.
- Croom, A. 2010. Roman Furniture. Stroud, The History Press.
- Rushworth, A., Croom, A., Bishop, M. C., MacRae, C., Johnstone, M., 2016. Segedunum : excavations by Charles Daniels in the Roman fort at Wallsend (1975-1984). Volume 1 The structural remains. Oxford, Oxbow.
