= Footwear =

Garments worn on feet

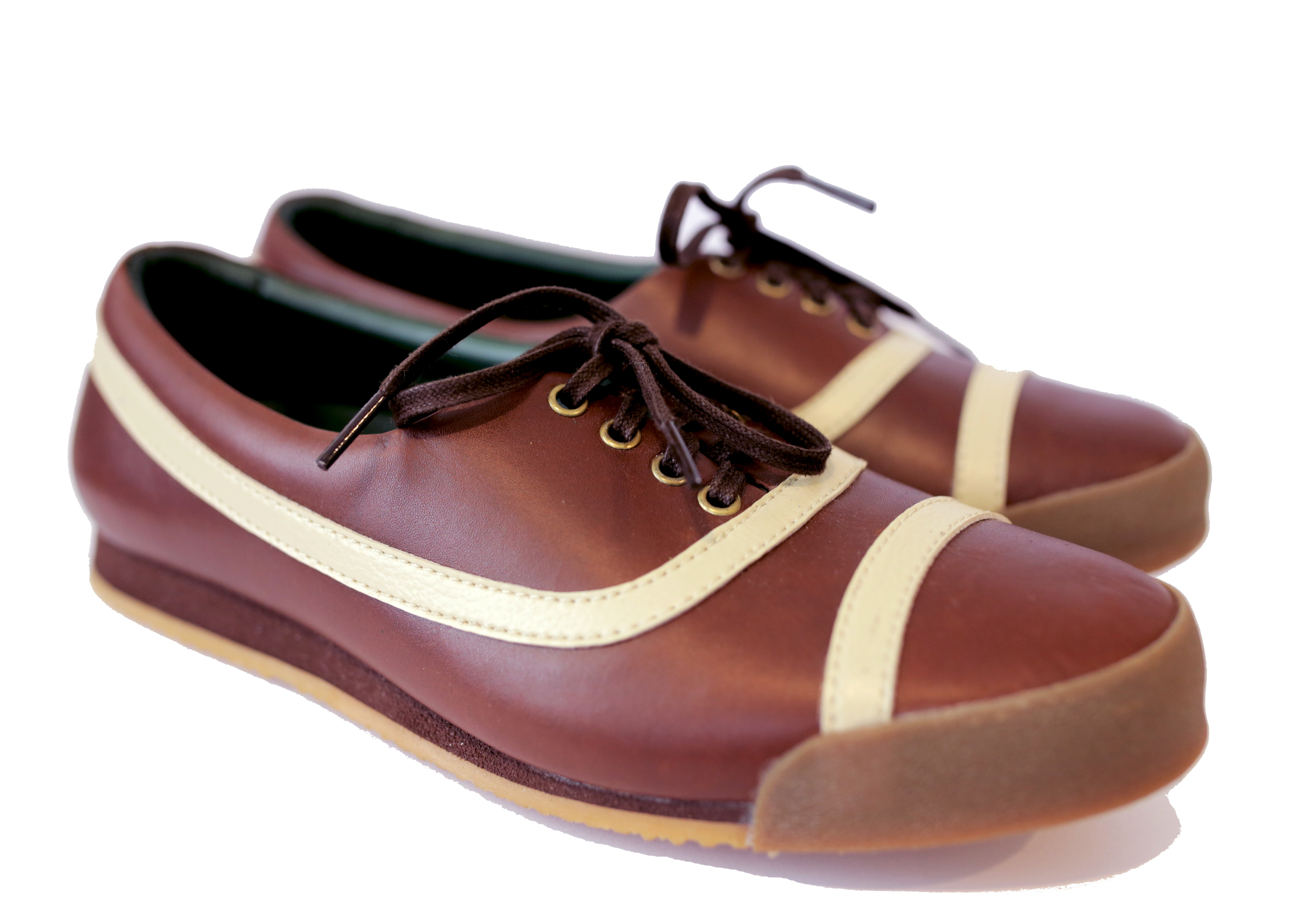
Sneakers are a type of footwear.

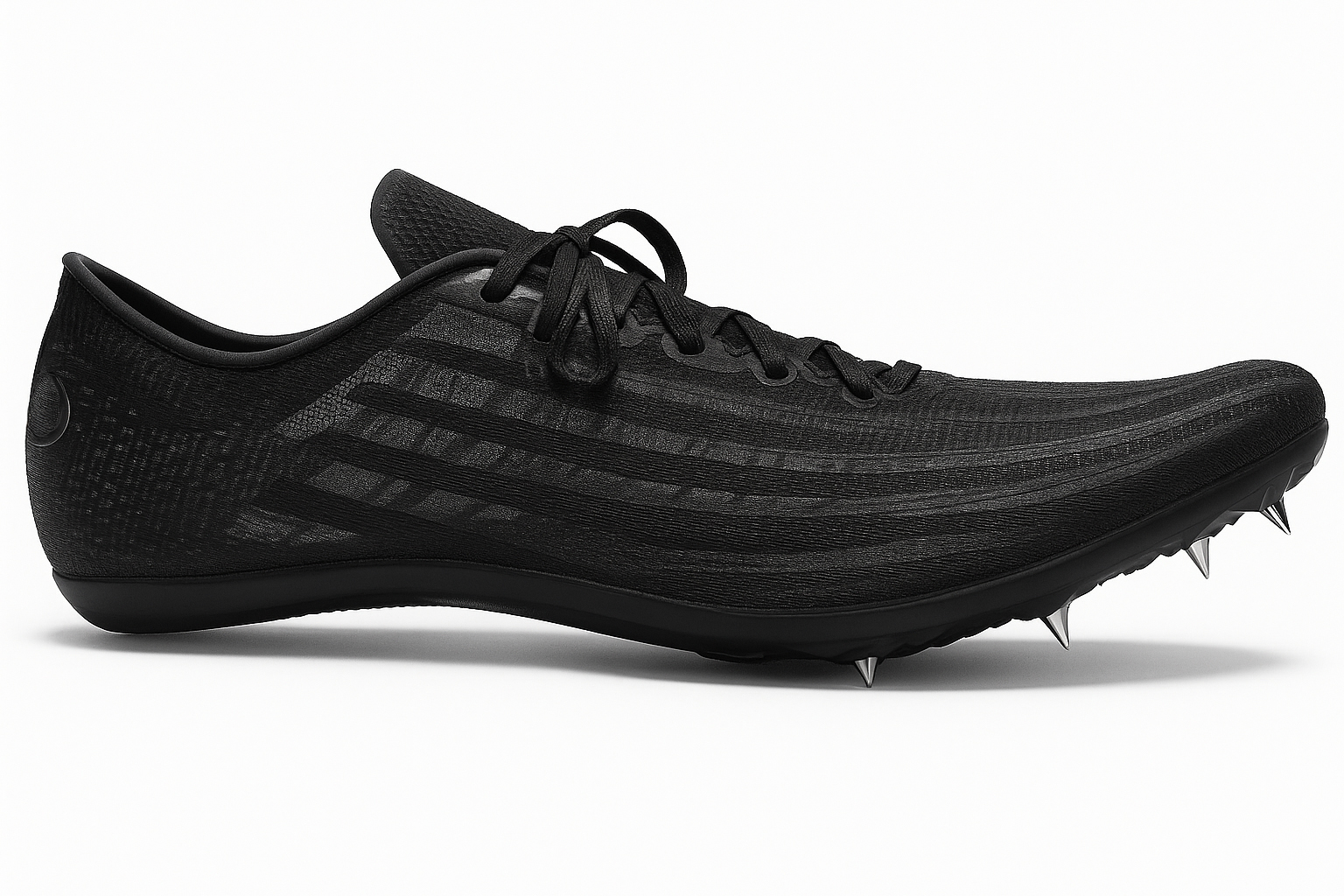
A pair of track shoes with spikes. They are designed for running and demonstrate how footwear can be used for specific purposes. The ultra-lightweight upper ensures the runner's step can be as light as possible and the spikes mean that a more stable foot placement can be achieved.

Footwear or footgear refers to garments worn on the feet, which typically serve the purpose of protection against adversities of the environment such as wear from rough ground; stability on slippery ground; and temperature.

- Shoes and similar garments ease locomotion and prevent injuries. Such footwear can also be used for fashion and adornment, as well as to indicate the status or rank of the person within a social structure.
- Socks and other hosiery are typically worn additionally between the feet and other footwear for further comfort and relief.

Cultures have different customs regarding footwear. These include not using any in some situations, usually bearing a symbolic meaning. This can however also be imposed on specific individuals to place them at a practical disadvantage against shod people, if they are excluded from having footwear available or are prohibited from using any. This usually takes place in situations of captivity, such as imprisonment or slavery, where the groups are among other things distinctly divided by whether or not footwear is being worn.

In some cultures, people remove their shoes before entering a home. Bare feet are also seen as a sign of humility and respect, and adherents of many religions worship or mourn while barefoot. Some religious communities explicitly require people to remove shoes before they enter holy buildings, such as temples.

In several cultures people remove their shoes as a sign of respect towards someone of higher standing. Similarly, deliberately forcing other people to go barefoot while being shod oneself has been used to clearly showcase and convey one's superiority within a setting of power disparity.

Practitioners of the craft of shoemaking are called shoemakers, cobblers, or cordwainers.

== History ==
Footwear has been used by humans since prehistoric times, with paleoclimatology suggesting that they would have been needed in some areas of human settlement by at least 50,000 years ago (BP) during the Last Glacial Period. Fossilised tracks have been found on the South Cape Coast, South Africa, that may date to 130,000 BP. Osteologists have found evidence of the effect of footwear on human remains by around 40,000 years ago. The oldest shoes so far recovered were found on the Spirit Cave mummy, from Great Basin Desert in Nevada, and dating to approximately 10, 600 BP. Another pair of shoes were recovered by a team under Luther Cressman in Fort Rock Cave, Oregon, US, in 1938. They had been preserved under the Mazama Ash deposited c. 5025 BC during the volcanic eruption that formed Crater Lake. In 1999, they were dated to around 10,500–9,300 BP.

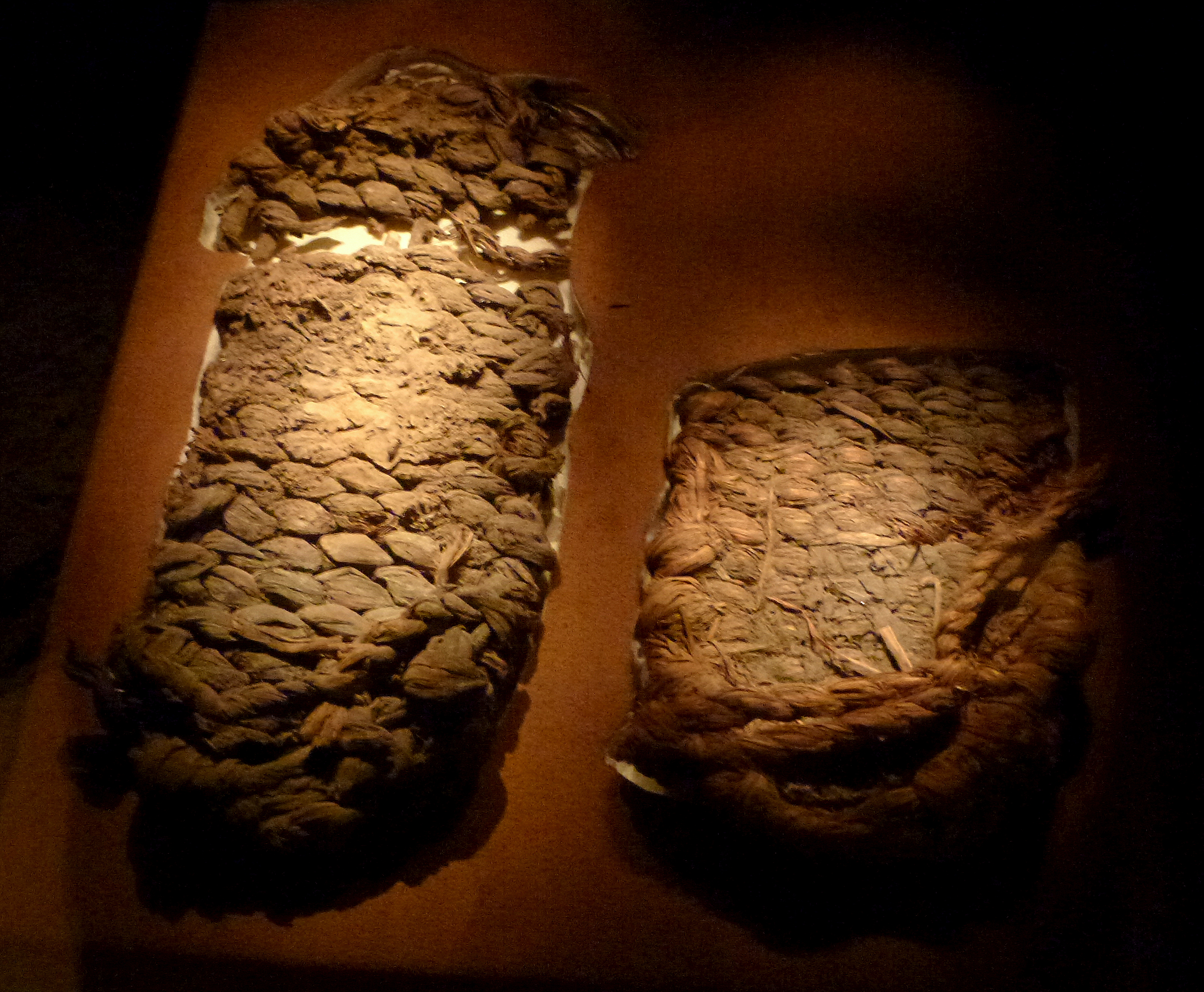
The Fort Rock sagebrush sandals from the United States (c. 7300 BC)

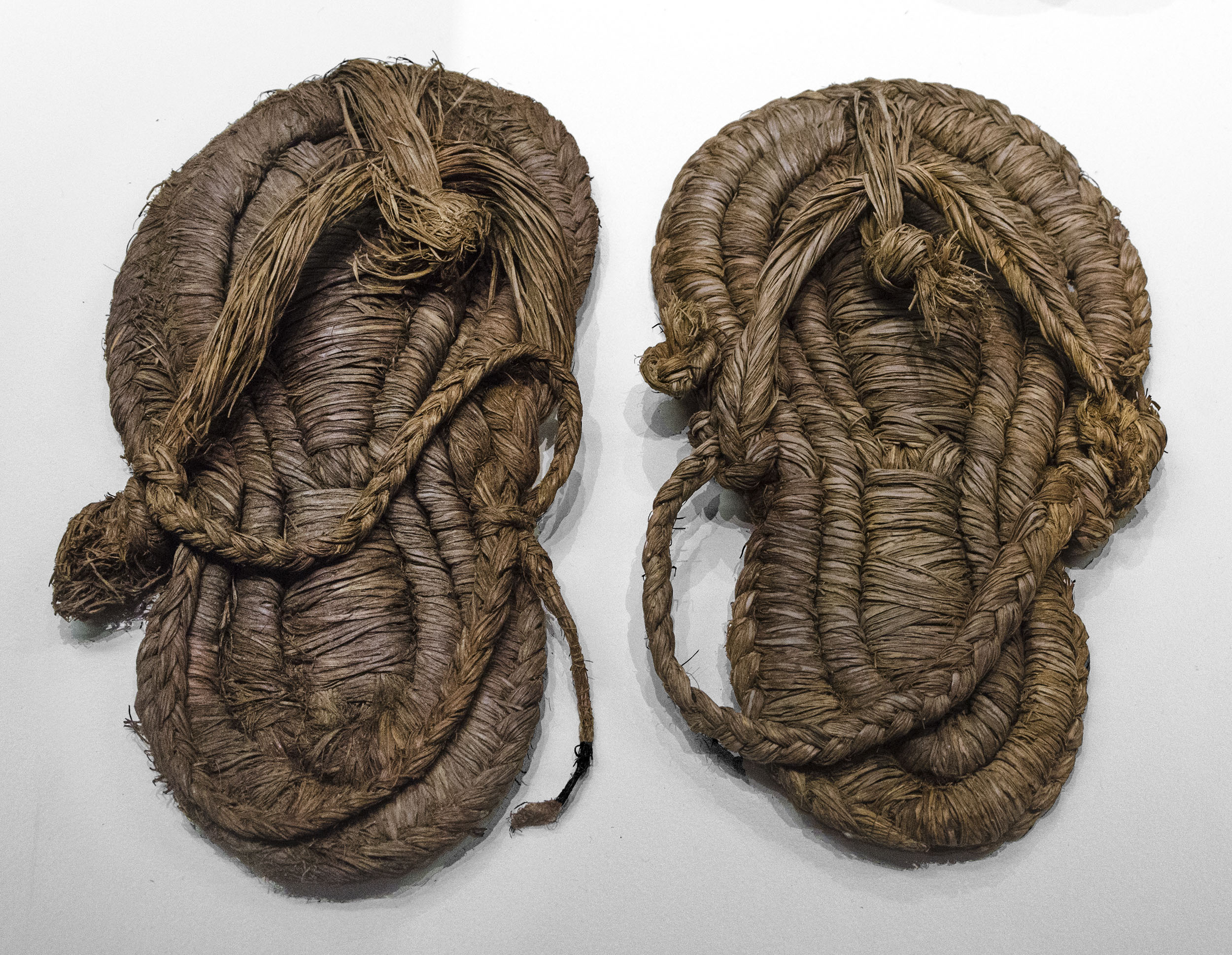
Neolithic esparto sandals from Spain (c. 5000 BC)

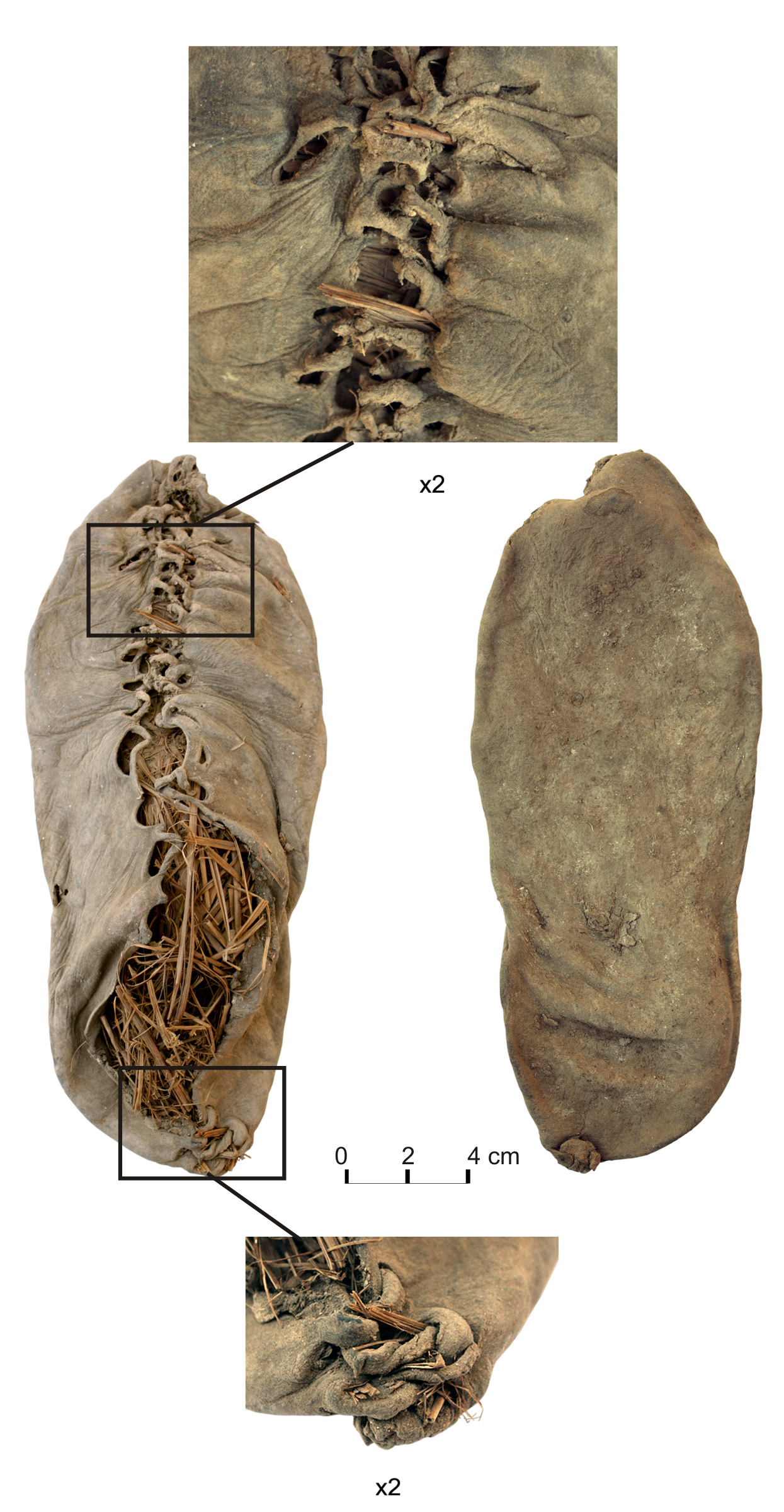
The Areni-1 shoe from Armenia (c. 3500 BC)

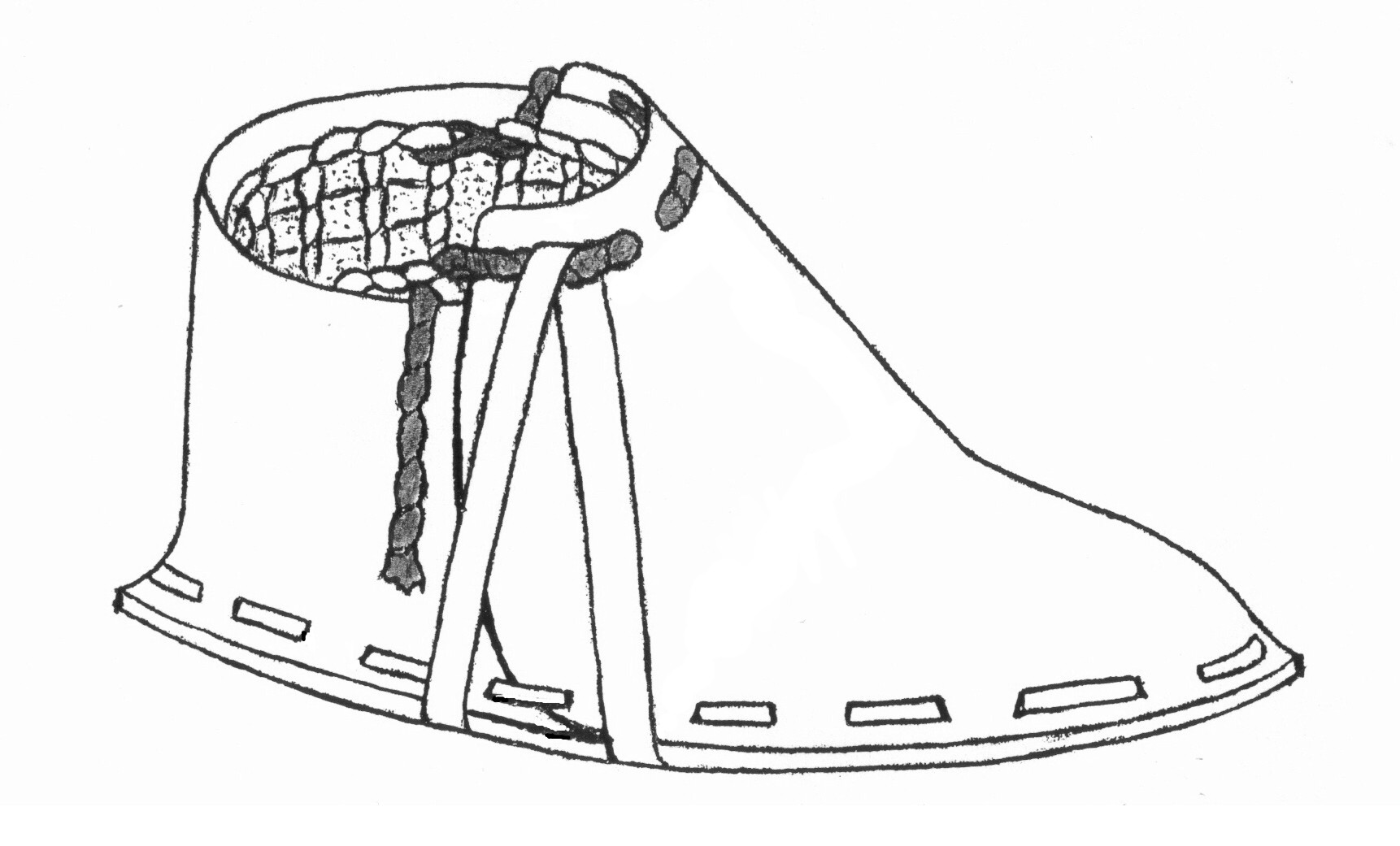
Ötzi's shoe, made from bearskin, deer hide, and tree bark (c. 3200 BC)

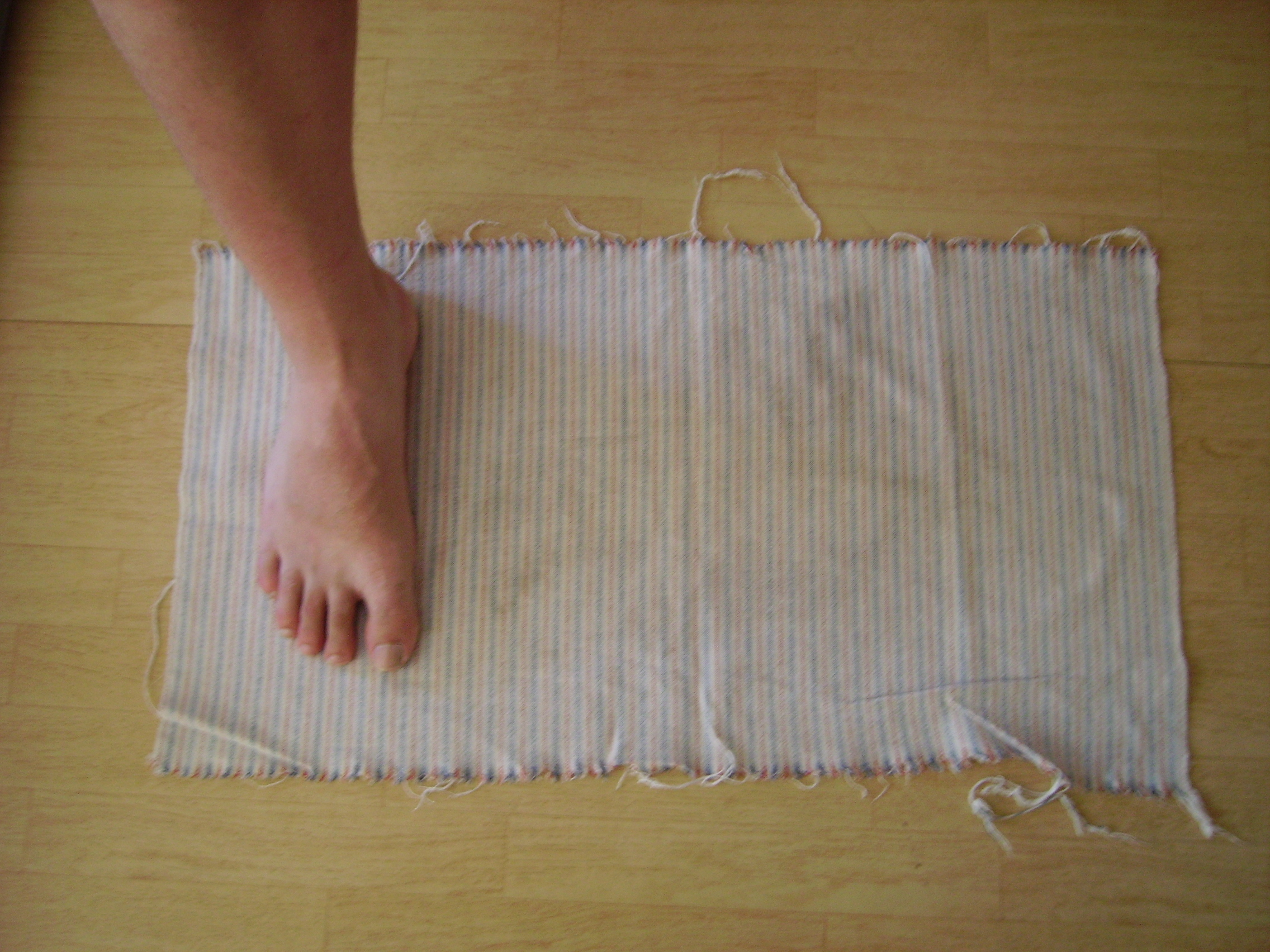
Footwraps were the common undershoe until the industrial era (2006)

Geta (wooden sandles) have been worn in East Asia, at least since the Liangzhu culture (3400–2250 BCE). Egyptian butchers sometimes wore platform sandals with thicker soles than usual to raise their feet out of the gore. Wealthier Egyptians also sometimes wore platforms. The Greeks distinguished a great variety of footwear, particularly different styles of sandals. The heeled cothurnus was part of the standard costume for tragedians, and the effeminate soccus for comedians. Going barefoot, however, was frequently lauded: Spartan boys undergoing military training, Socrates, and Olympic athletes all went without shoes most of the time. Similarly, ancient China considered footwear an important aspect of civilization—particularly embroidered slippers—but often depicted Taoist immortals and gods like Xuanwu barefoot. The Book of Exodus records Moses reverentially removing his shoes at Mount Sinai and the priests likewise went barefoot at the Temple of Solomon before Babylonian customs prevailed and entering houses of worship in footwear became common in Judaism and Christianity.

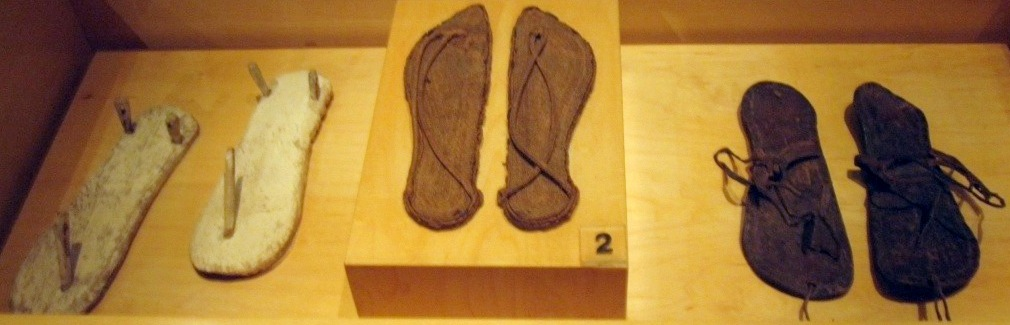
Egyptian sandals (c. 2500 BC to c. 500 BC)

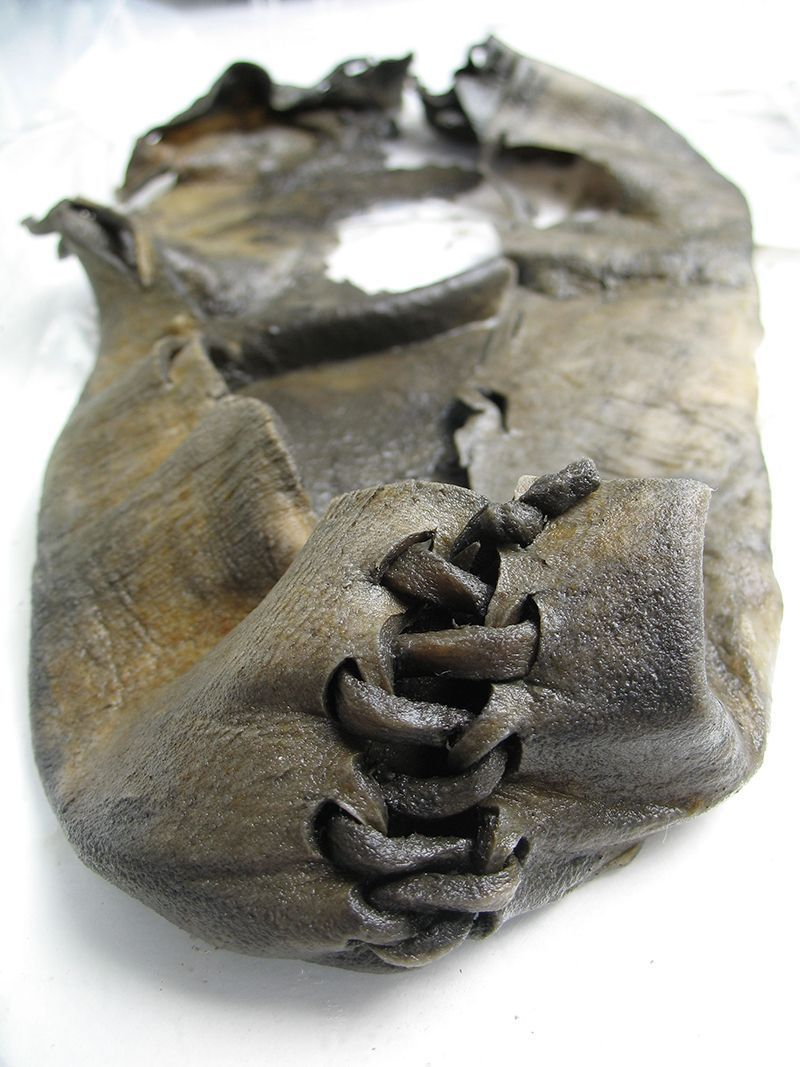
The Jotunheimen shoe from Norway (c. 1800–1100 BC)

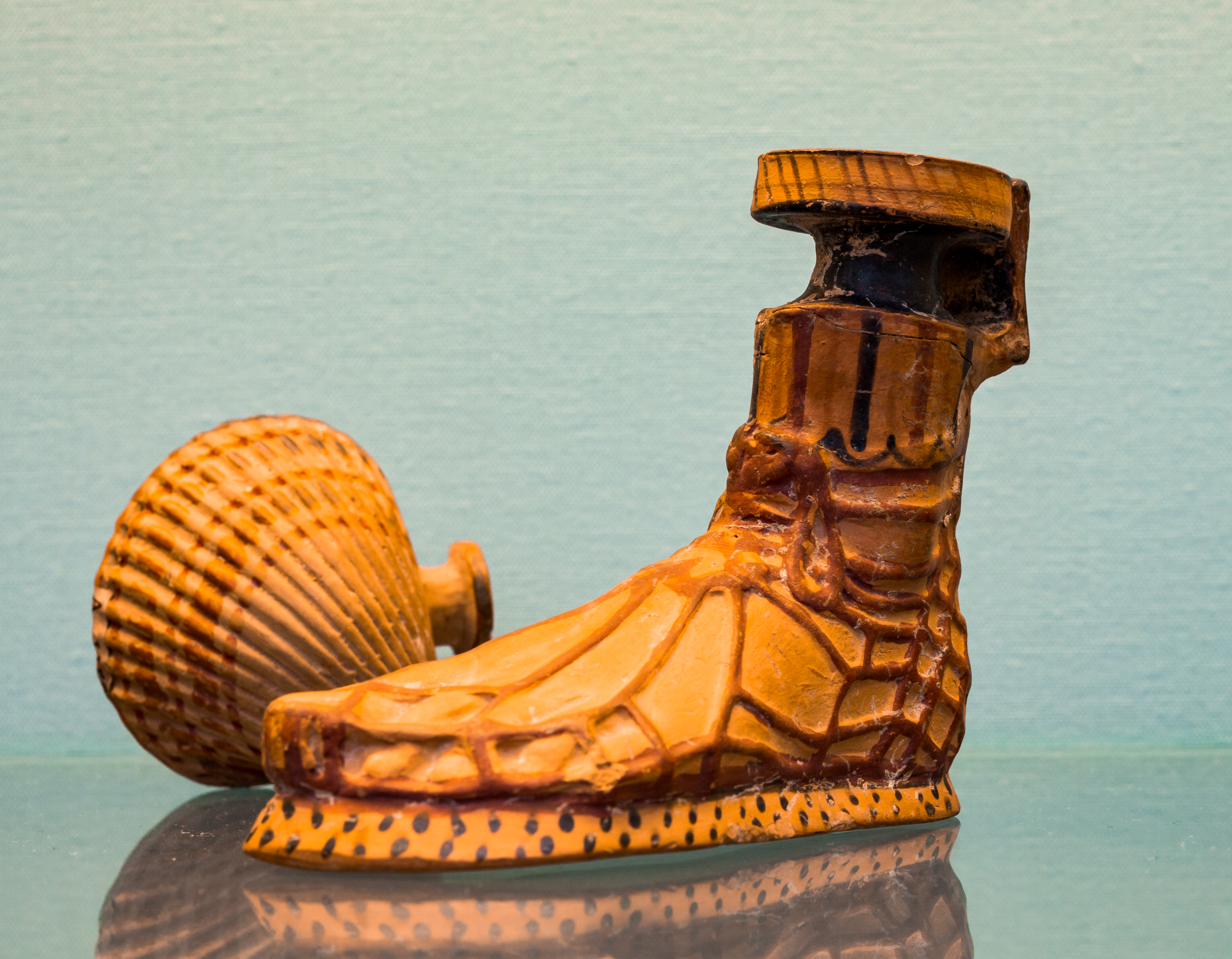
Greek aryballos of a sandaled foot (c. 500 BC)

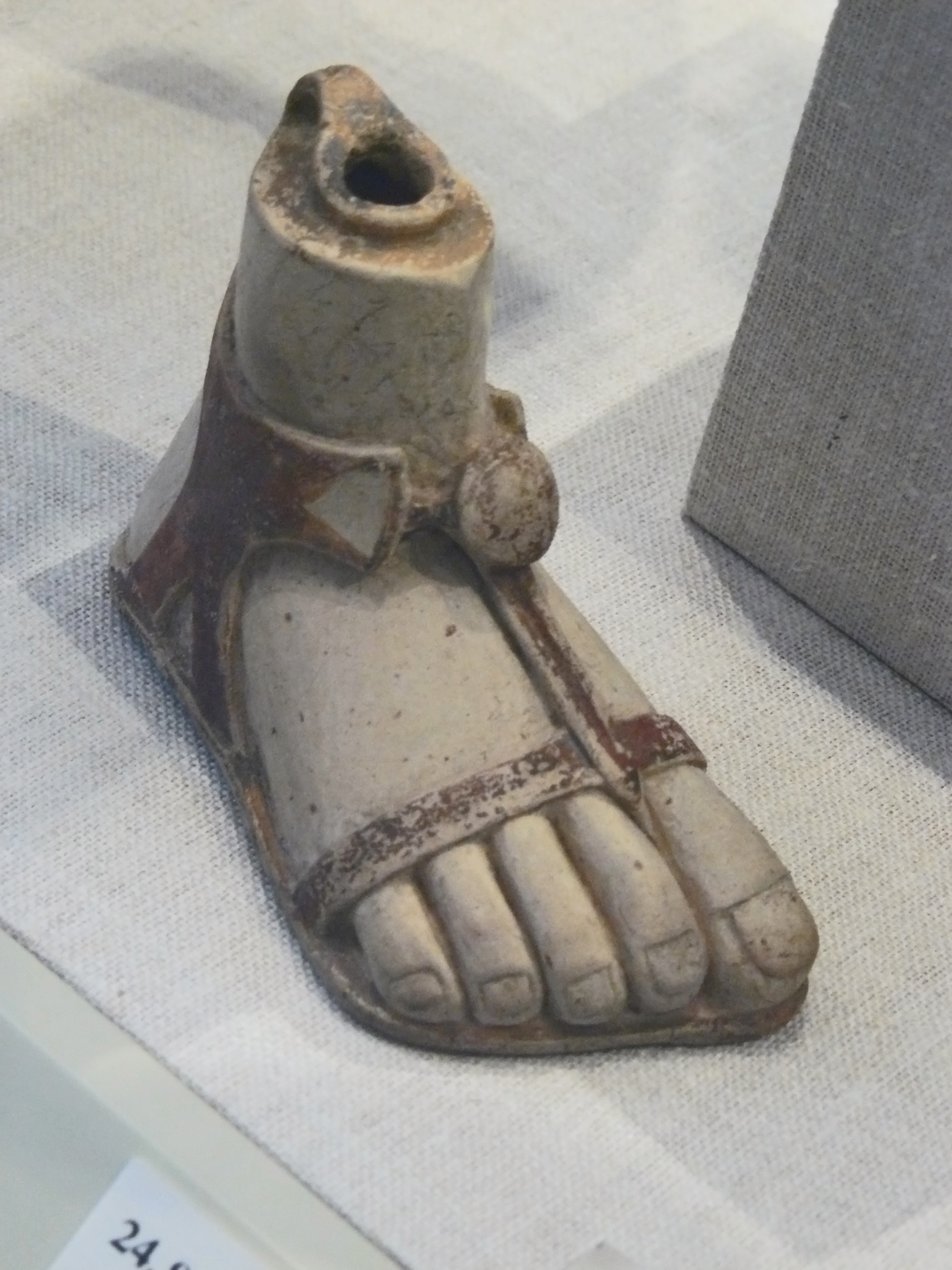
Rhodian aryballos of a shod foot (c. 500 BC)

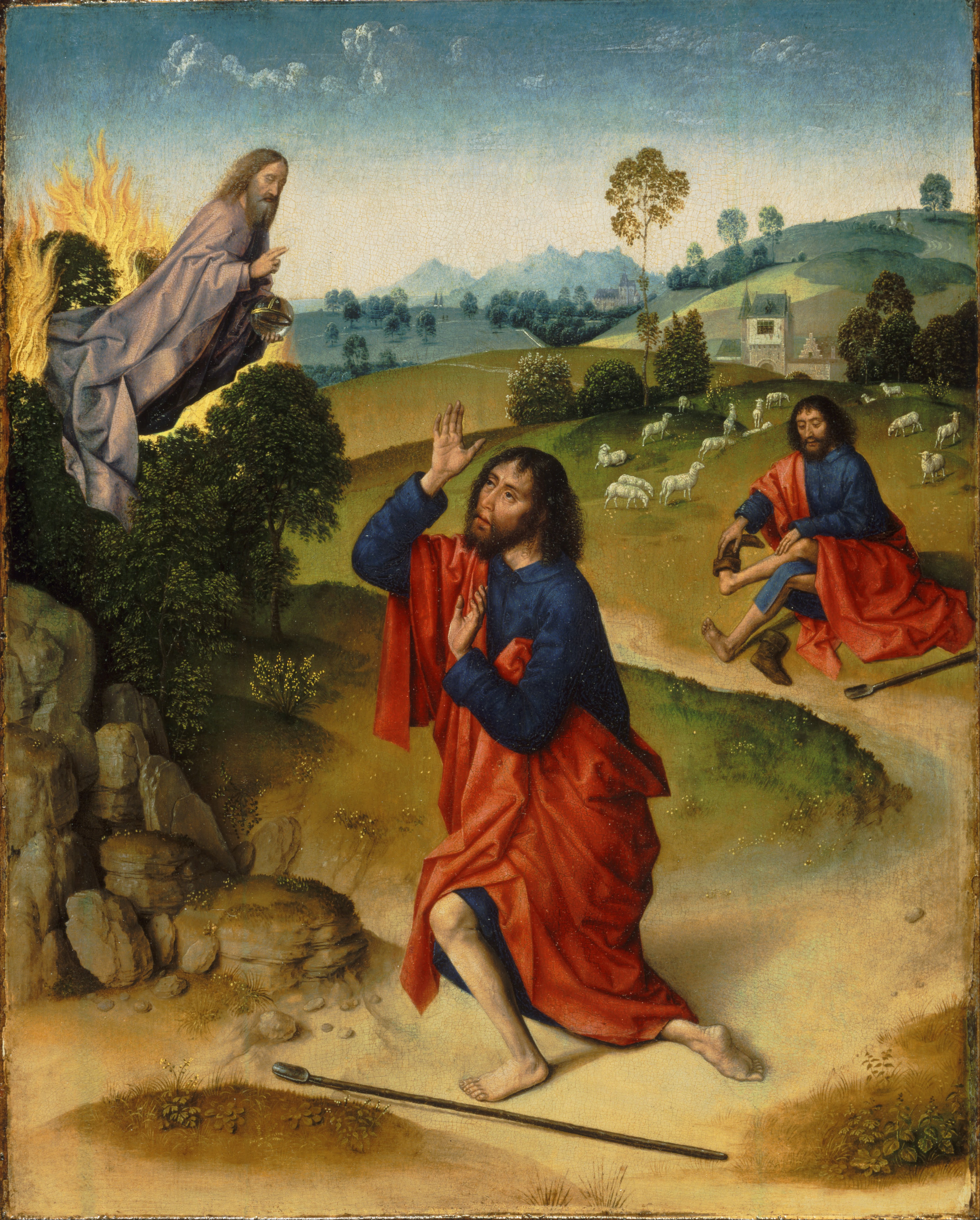
Moses removing his shoes at Sinai (c. 1465)

The Etruscans experienced several footwear trends, including the prominently pointed shoe or boot now known as the calceus repandus. The Romans saw clothing and footwear as unmistakable signs of power and status in society. Patricians typically wore dyed and ornamented shoes of tanned leather with their togas or armor, while plebeians wore rawhide or hobnail boots and slaves were usually required to be barefoot. These class distinctions in footwear seem to have lessened during the imperial period, however, as the emperors appropriated more and more symbols of high status for themselves. The Romans were the earliest people currently known to have shaped their right and left shoes distinctly during creation, rather than pulling them tight and allowing them to wear into shape. The Catholic patron saints of shoemaking—Crispin and Crispinian—were martyred during the Diocletianic Persecution.

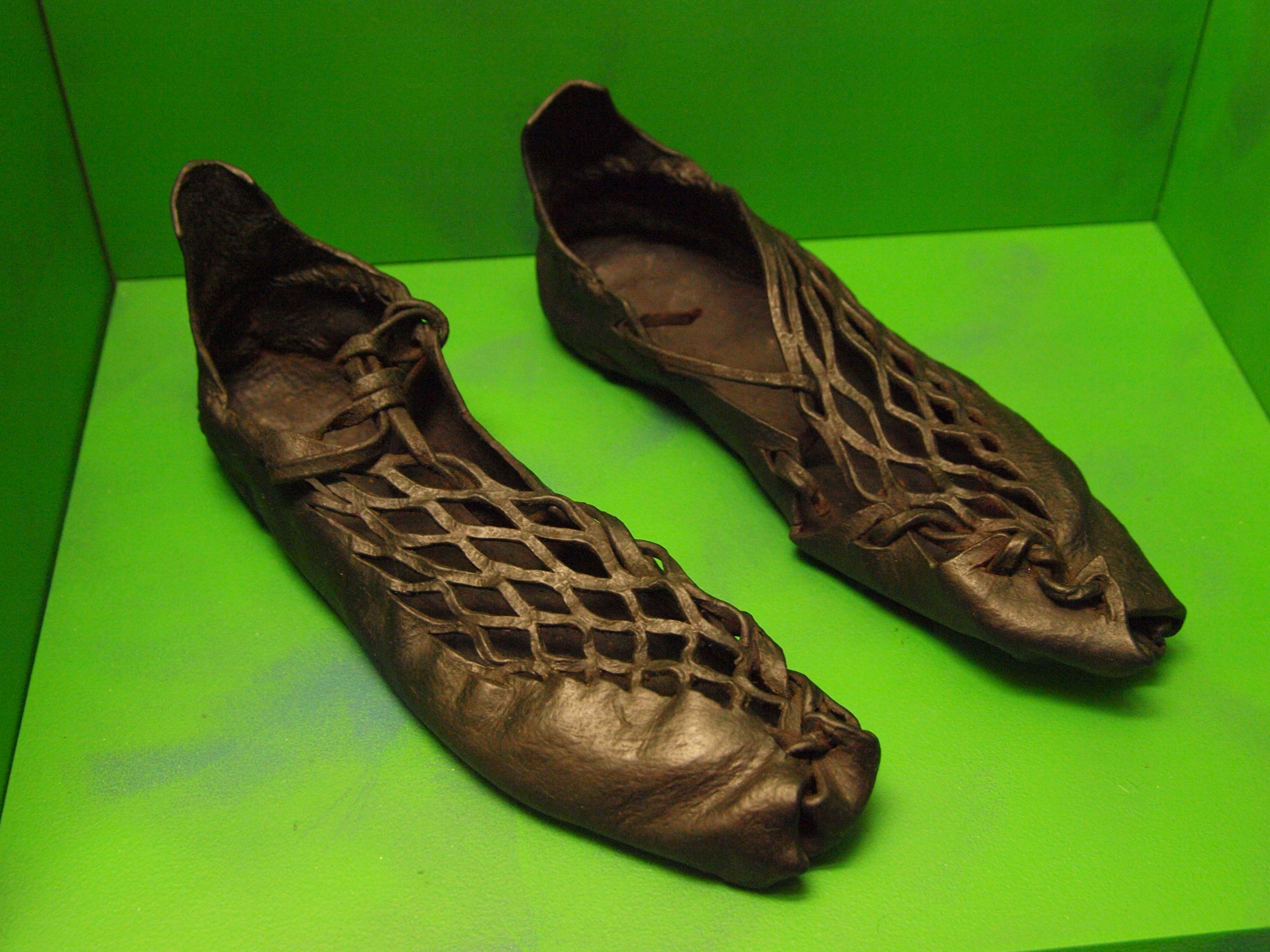
The carbatina of the bog body Damendorf Man (c. 300 BC)

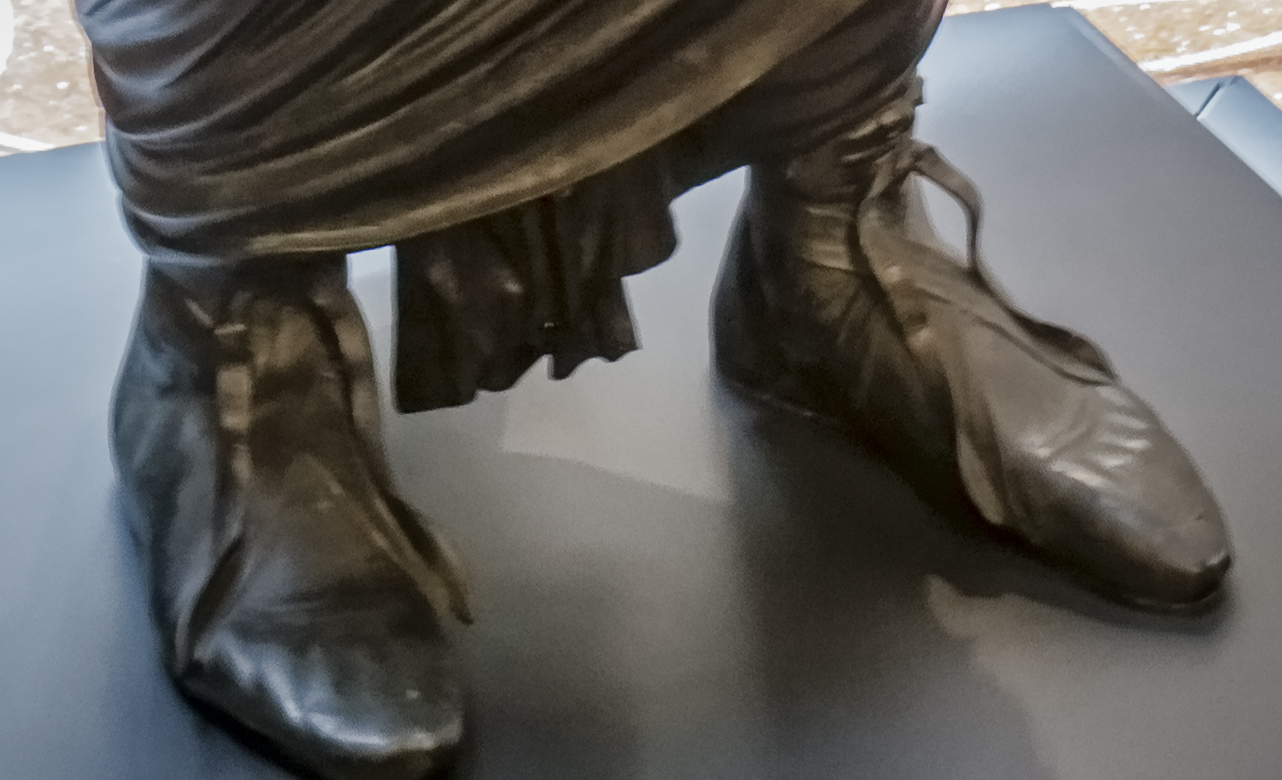
Patrician calceus on the feet of the Emperor Tiberius (c. 37)

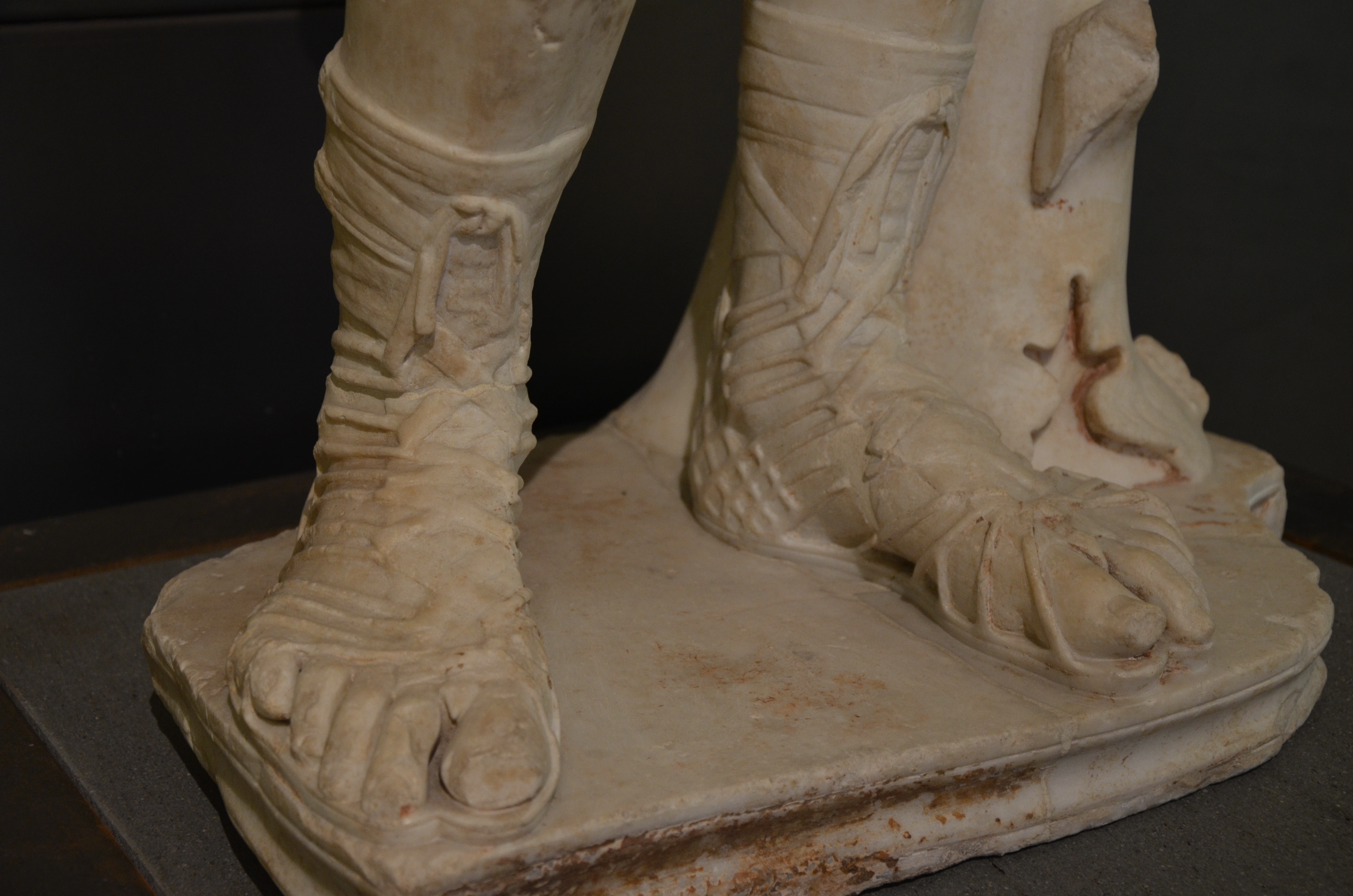
Caligae, the hobnailed sandal-boot of Roman legionaries (1st cent.)

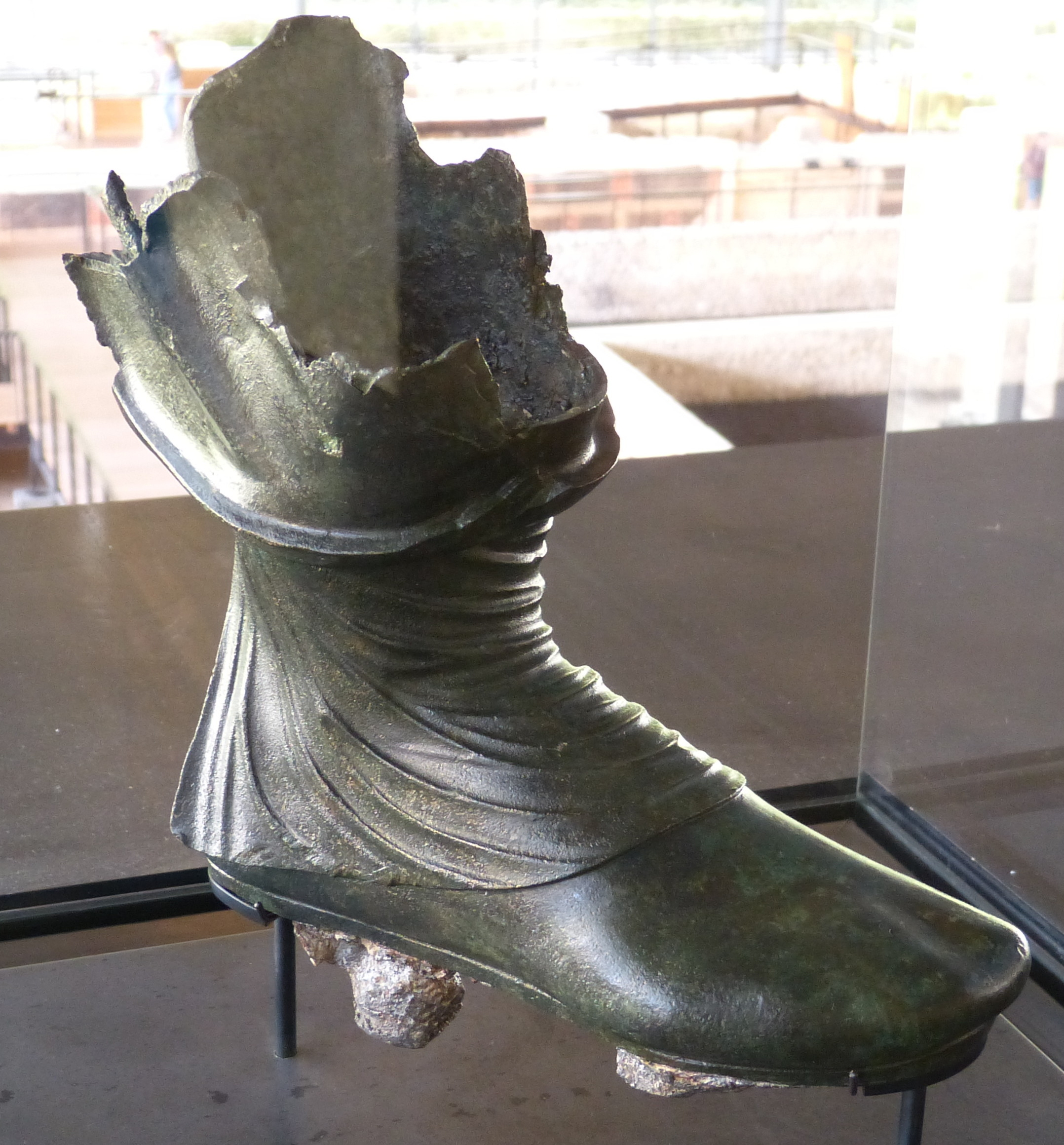
Equestrian calceus from a Roman statue in France

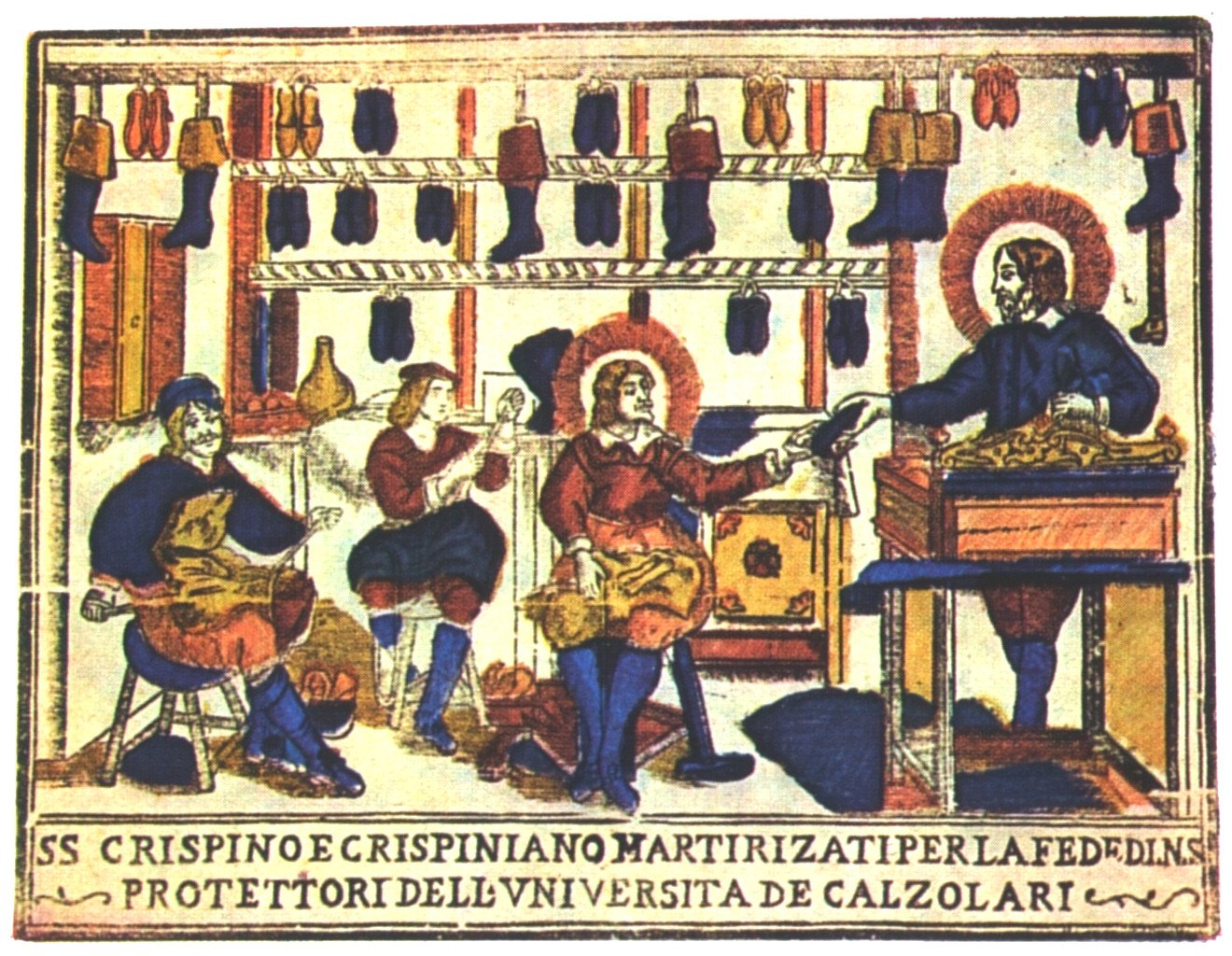
Crispin and Crispinian in an Italian print (18th cent.)

In medieval Europe, leather shoes and boots became more common. At first most were simply pieces of leather sewn together and then held tight around the foot with a toggle or drawstring. This developed into the turnshoe, where the sole and upper were sewn together and then turned inside-out to hide and protect the seam and improve water resistance. From the reign of Charlemagne, Byzantine fashions began to influence the west and the pontificalia of the popes and other bishops began to feature greater luxury, including embroidered silk and velvet slippers. By the High Middle Ages, fashion trends periodically prompted sumptuary taxes or regulations and church condemnation for vanity. The 12th-century pigache and 14th- and 15th-century poulaine had elongated toes, often stuffed to maintain their shape. Around the same time, several mendicant orders began practicing discalceation as an aspect of their vows of humility and poverty, going entirely barefoot at all times or only wearing sandals in any weather. From the 1480s, the poulaine was replaced by the duckbill, which had a flat front but soon became impractically wide. The stiff hose of the era usually required fairly soft footwear, which in turn was easier to damage in the dirt and muck of the street and outdoors. This led many people to use wooden-soled calopedes, pattens, or galoshes, overshoes that served as a platform while walking. Particularly in Venice, these platforms were combined with the shoe to make chopines, sometimes so awkwardly high that the wearer required servants to help support them. (Turkish sources, meanwhile, credit the chopines directly to the nalins worn in Ottoman baths and whose height was considered to be a marker of status.)

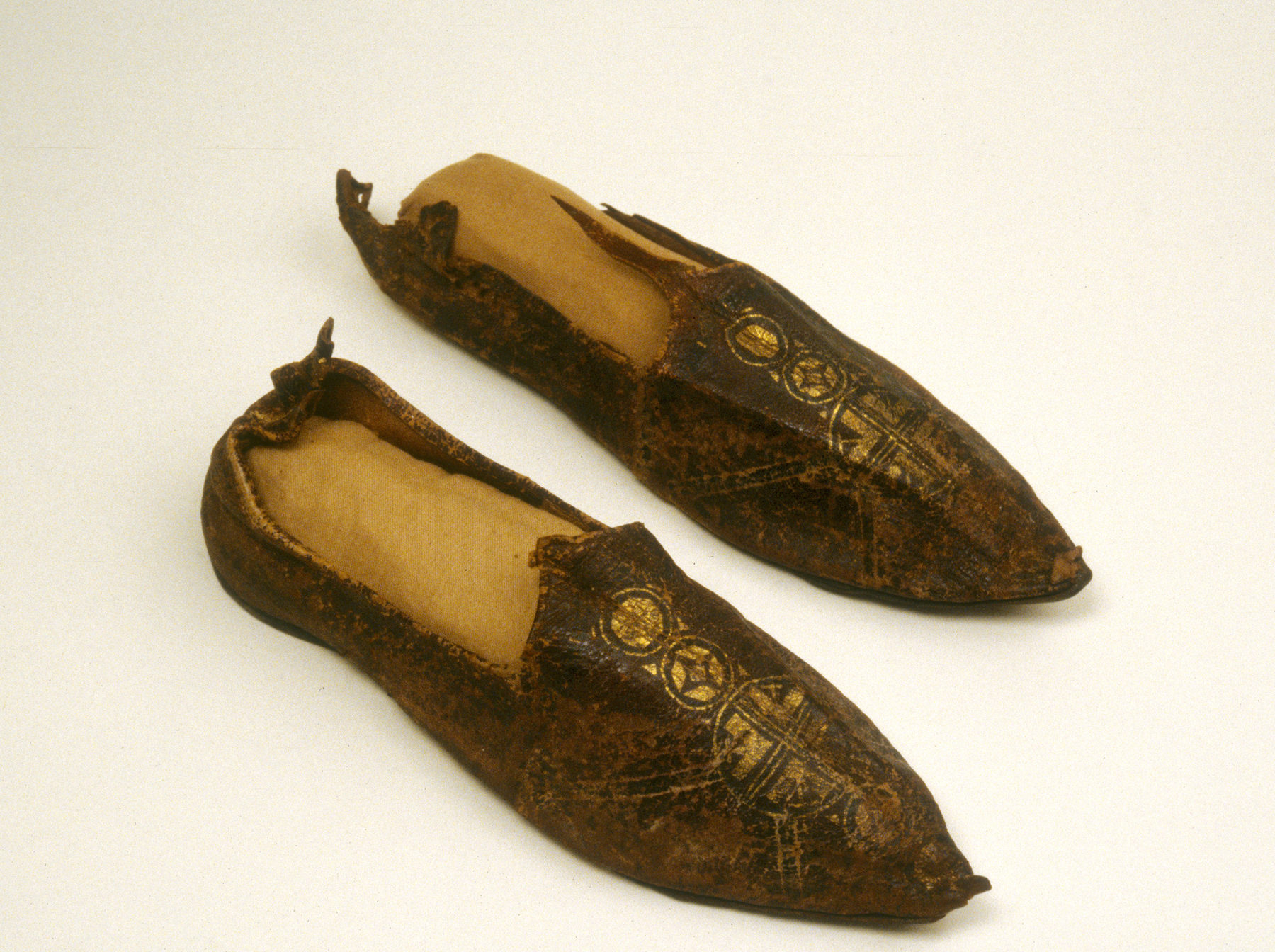
Byzantine Egyptian slippers decorated in gold (6th cent.)

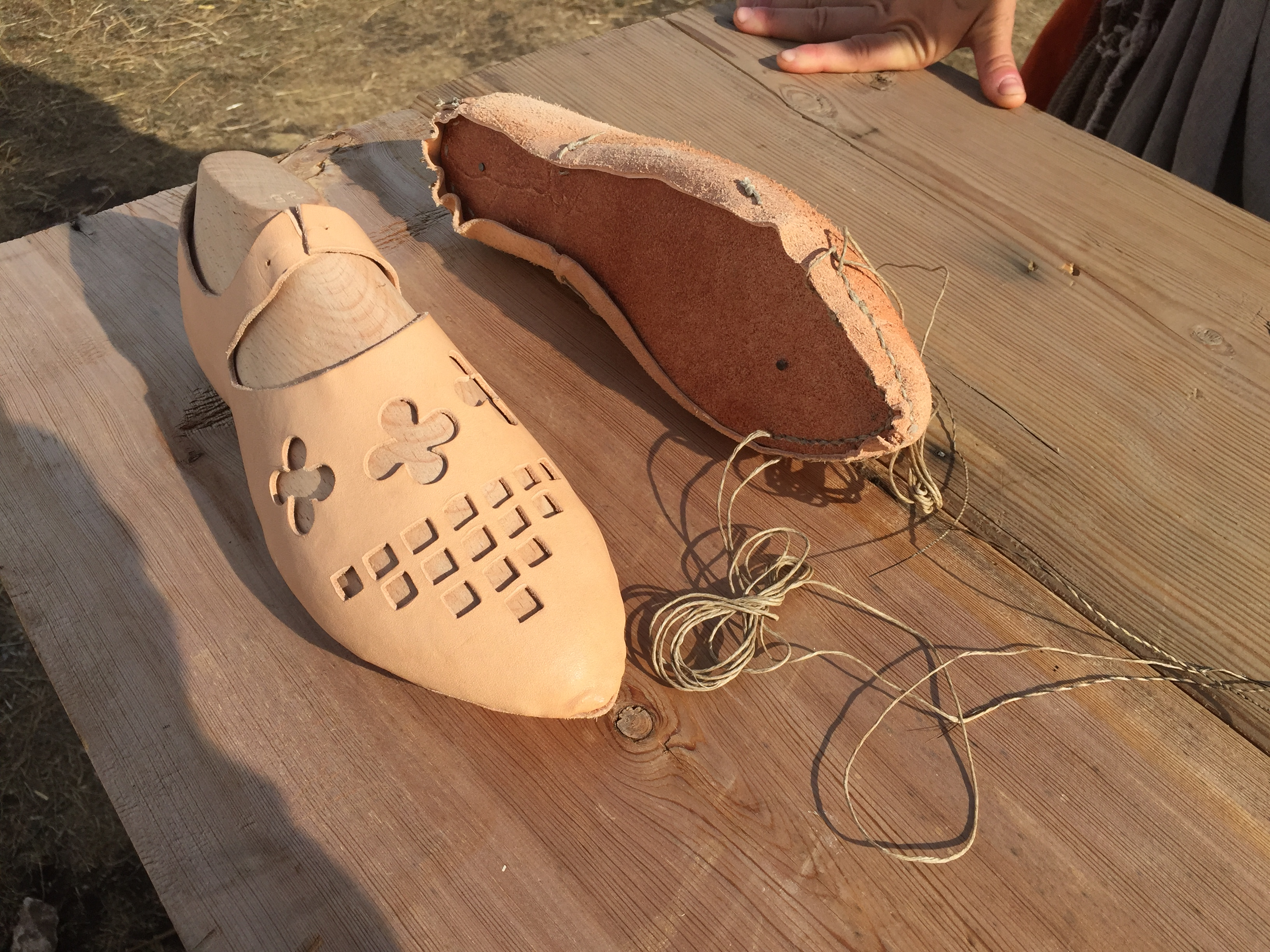
Medieval turnshoes being made on modern lasts (2016)

The arms of Poulaines, a French village named for the long-toed medieval shoe

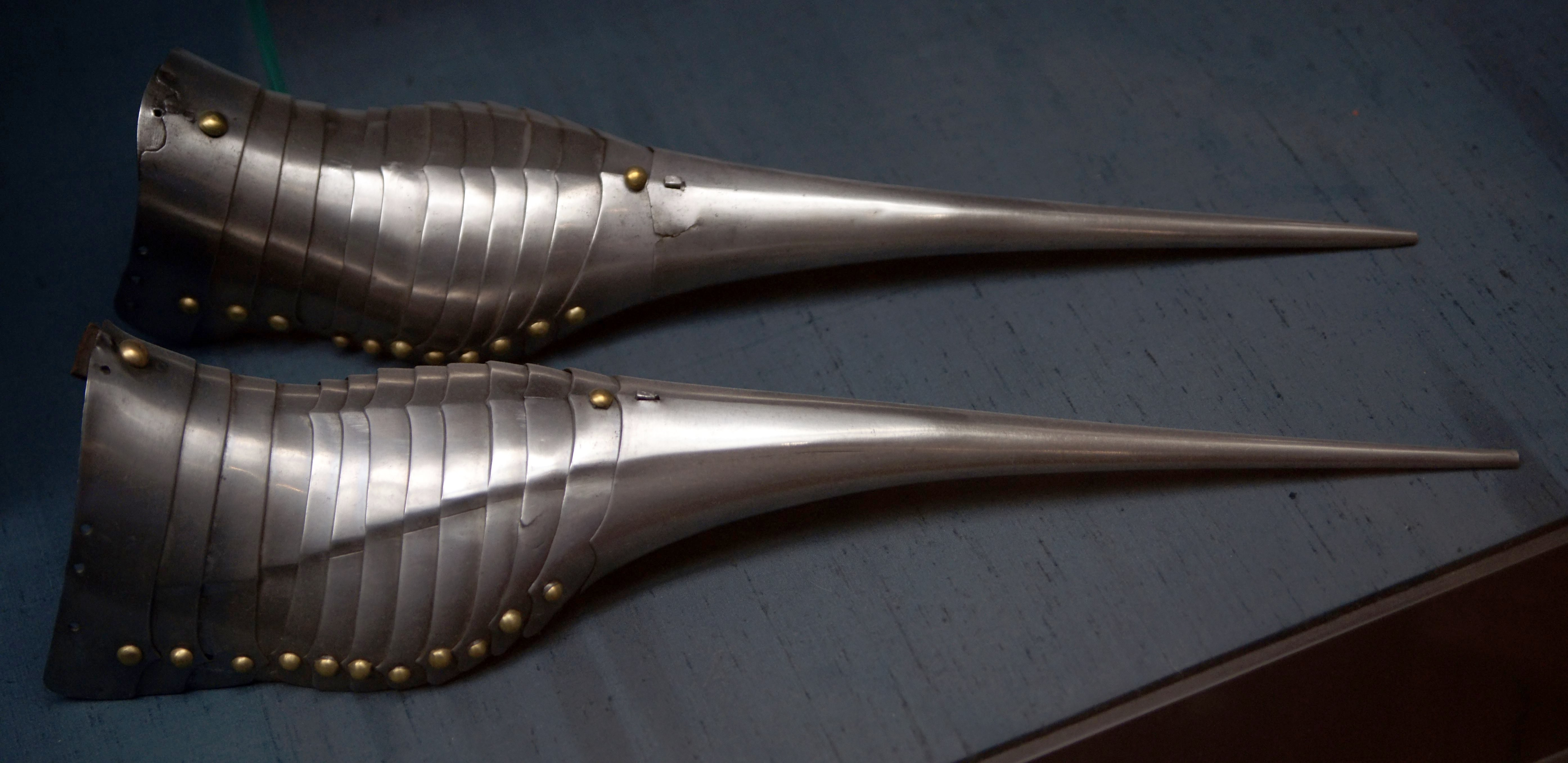
The sabatons of Emperor Maximilian I, done in the poulaine style (1485)

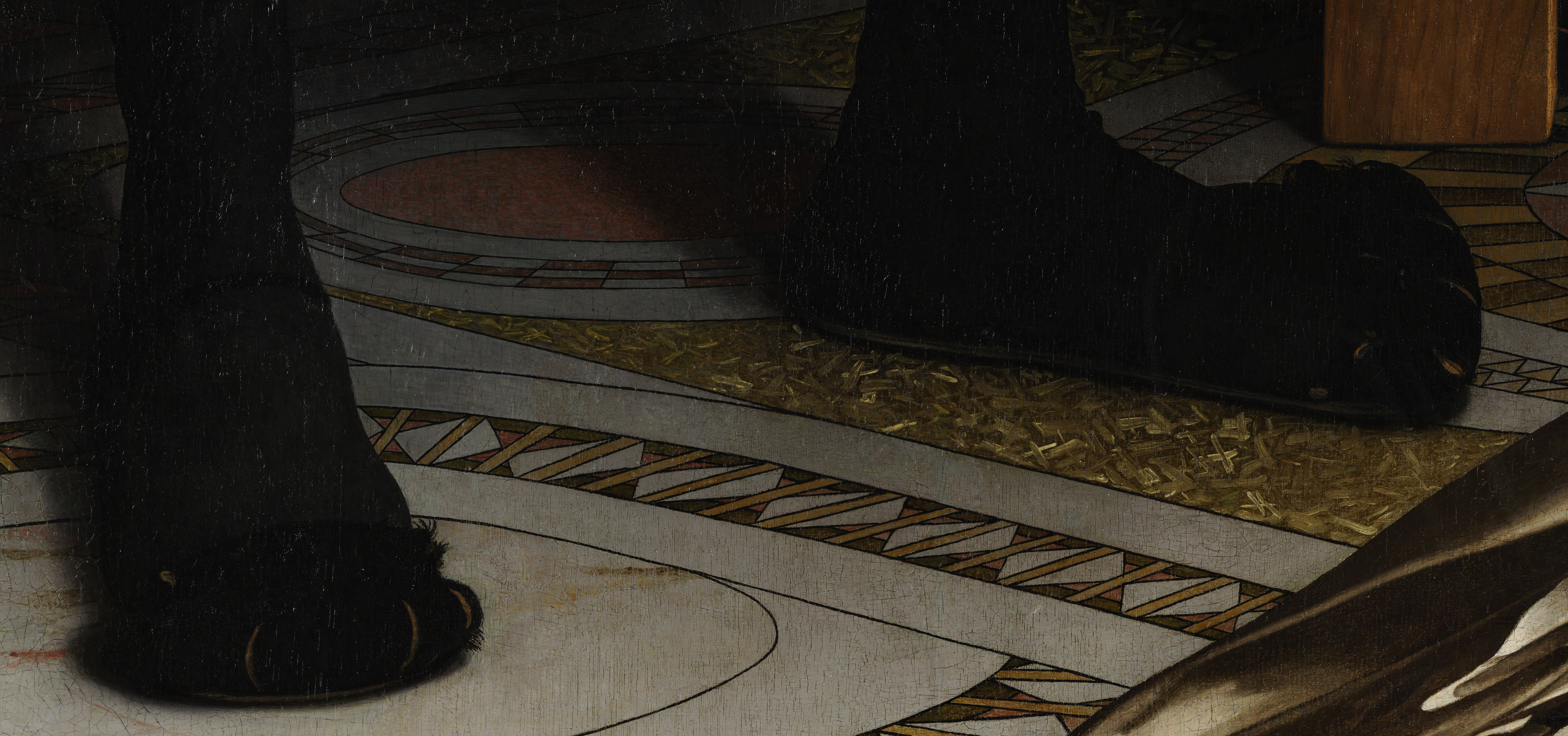
The French ambassador's duckbill shoes in Hans Holbein's The Ambassadors (1533)

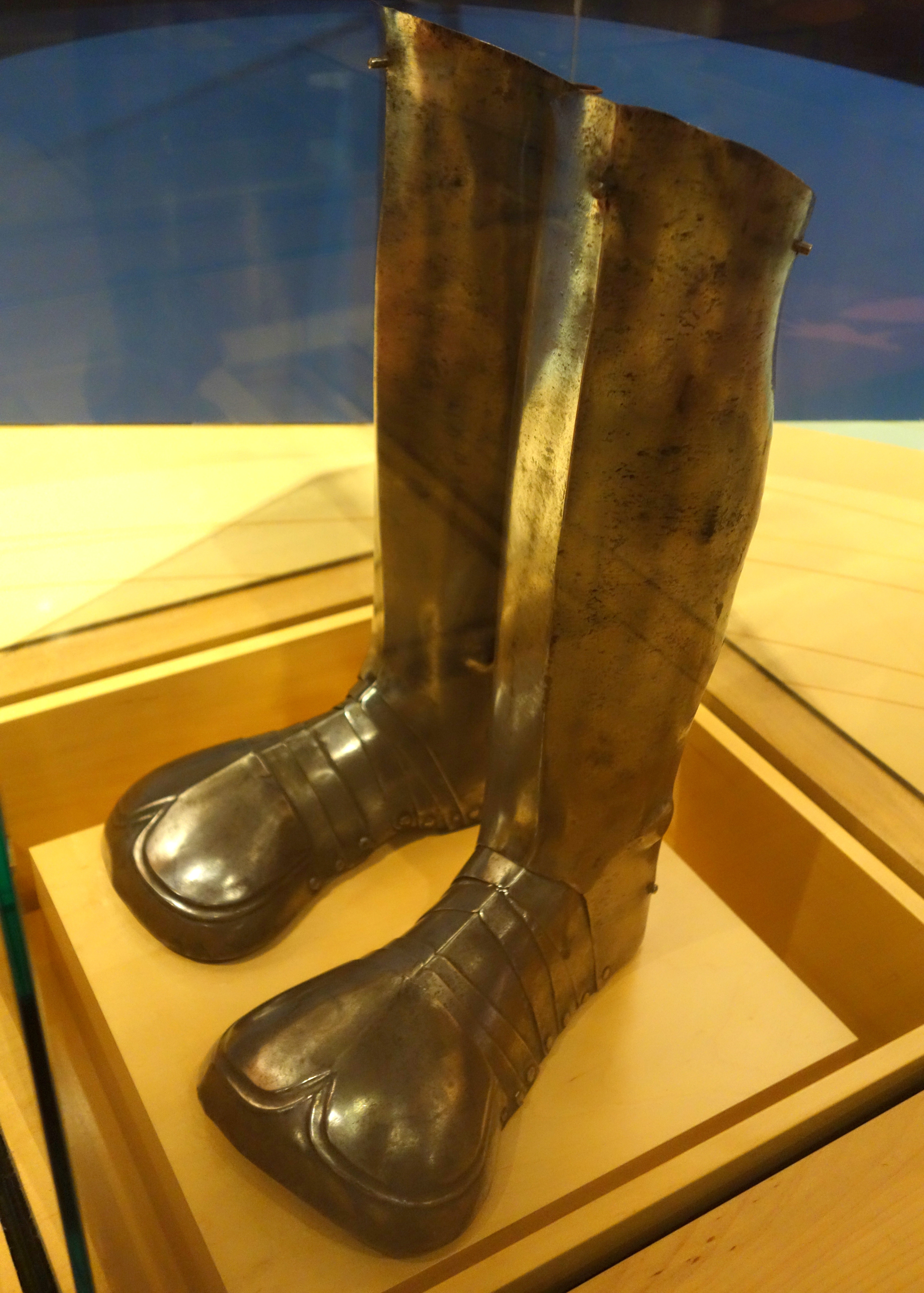
German sabatons done in the duckbill style (16th cent.)

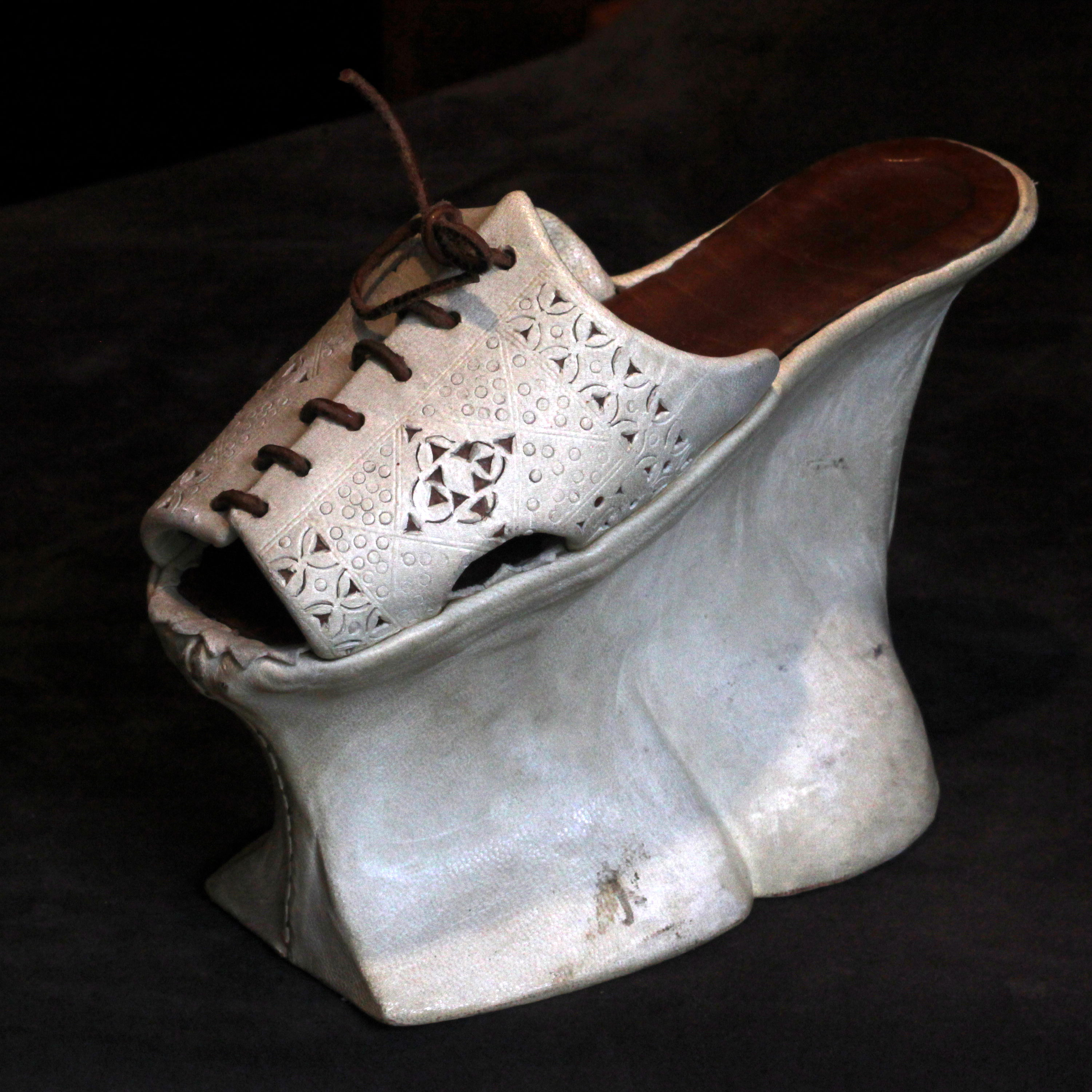
Modern reconstruction of a Venetian chopine from the 16th cent.

By the early modern period, the development of better socks and less stiff hose allowed European footwear to become firmer and more durable. Welting was developed, using a narrow band of leather between the uppers and sole to improve appearance and comfort, increase water resistance, and simplify repair, particularly resoling worn shoes. Beginning with the 1533 marriage of the 14-year-old Florentine Catherine de Medici to Prince Henry of France, both male and female royalty and nobles began wearing high heels, giving rise to the expression "well heeled". This was done sometimes for display or appearance and sometimes as an aid to riding in stirrups. For the most part, male footwear was more ornate and expensive because women's feet were usually covered by the large dresses of the era. Shoe fetishism was first publicized in the work of Nicolas-Edme Rétif in prerevolutionary France. 17th-century Cavalier boots developed into upper-class fashion and into sailing boots prized by fishermen and pirates before being replaced as military gear by the 18th-century Hessian and 19th-century Wellington boot. In Ming and Qing China, foot binding led to the development of lotus shoes for Han women and then flowerpot shoes for the Manchu women who wanted to emulate the characteristic walk of women with bound feet without undergoing the process themselves. In Africa, North America, and Spanish and Portuguese South America, slave codes often mandated slaves should be barefoot at all times without exception. Following its independence, the American South was an exception. Its demand for masses of low-quality shoes for its slaves was met by workshops in Boston, Philadelphia, and New York, a dependence that later hobbled the Confederate Army during the Civil War and became responsible in legend for the decisive Battle of Gettysburg.

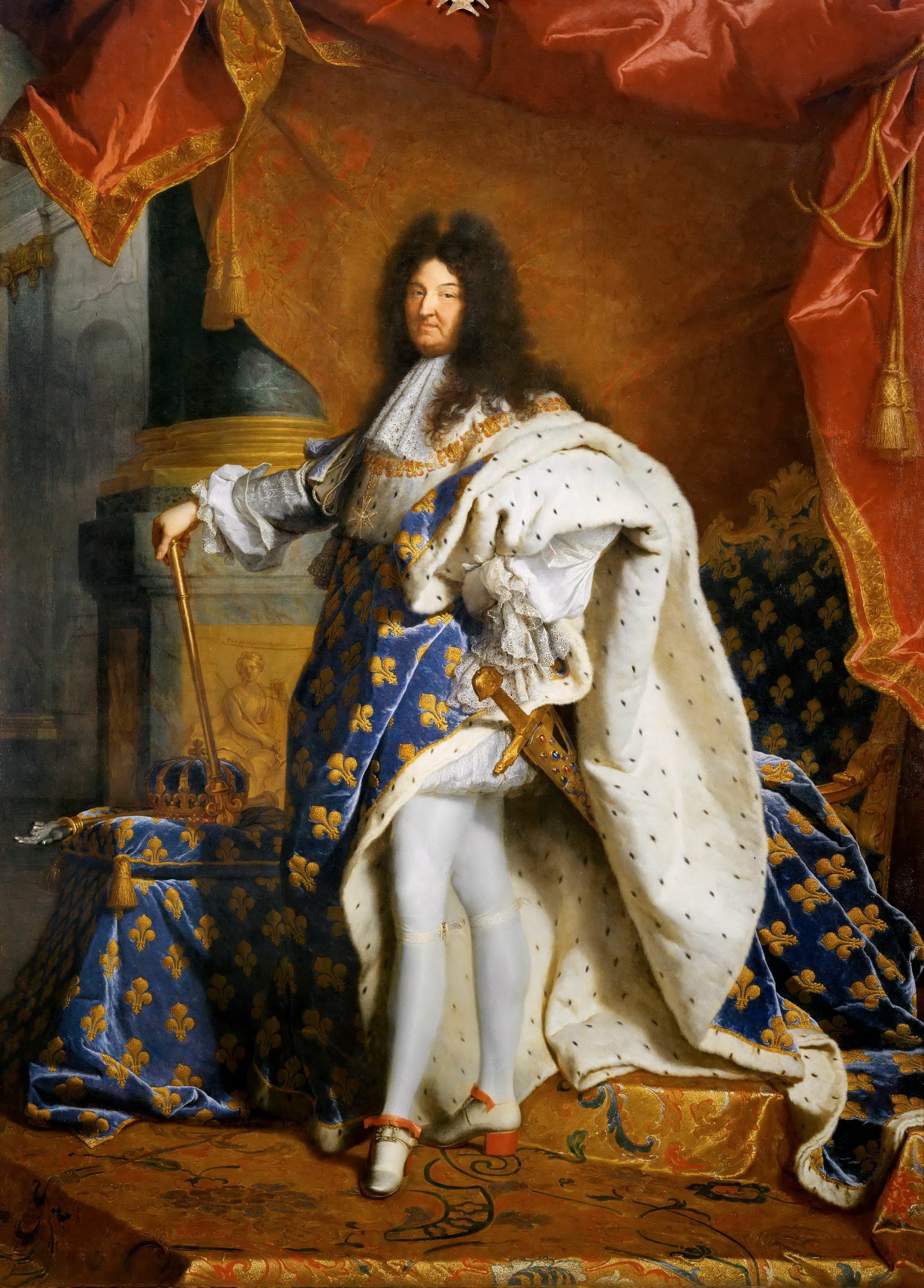
Louis XIV of France in chunky heels (c. 1700)

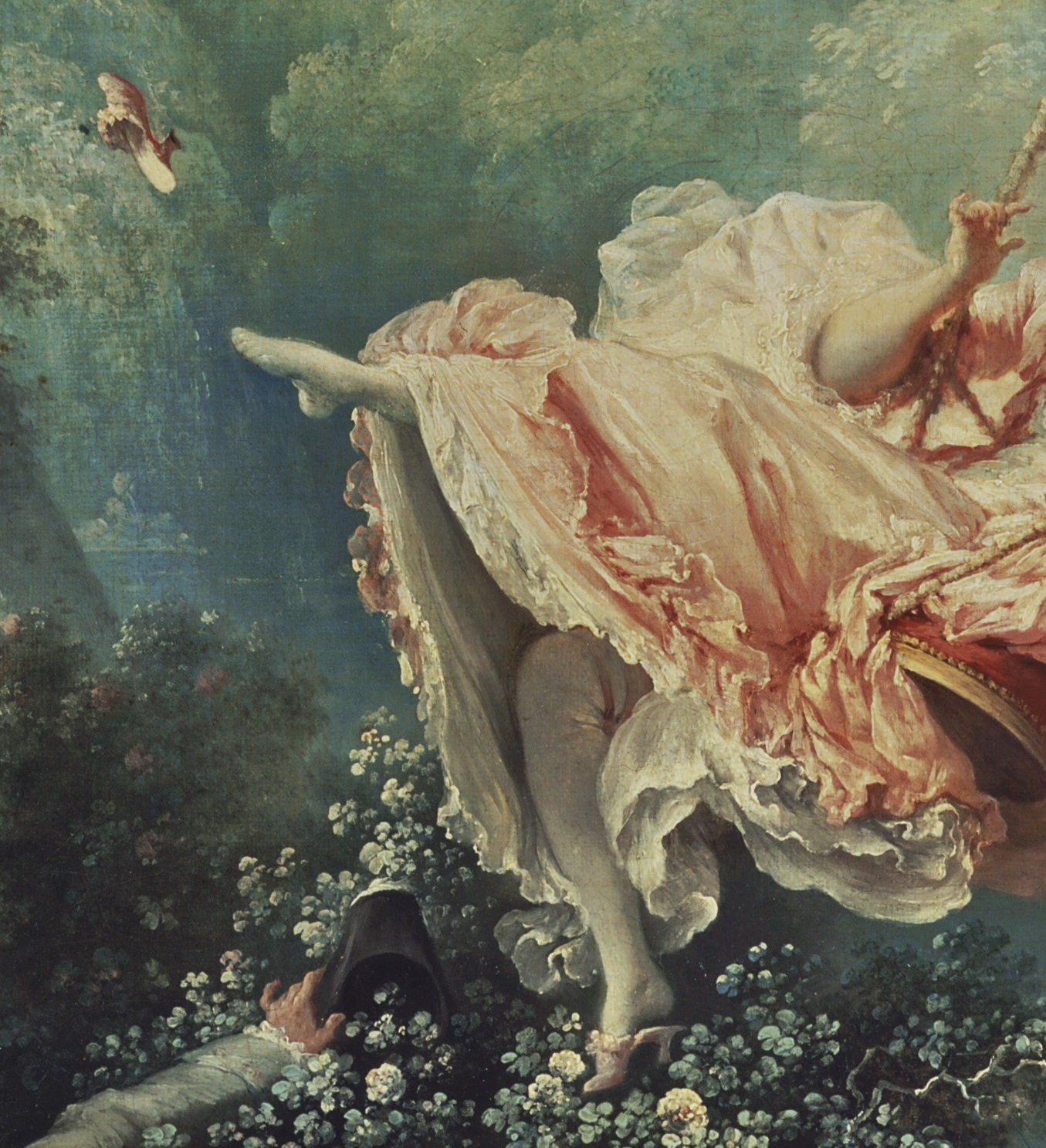
The mule flying from the woman's foot in Fragonard's Happy Accidents of the Swing (c. 1768)

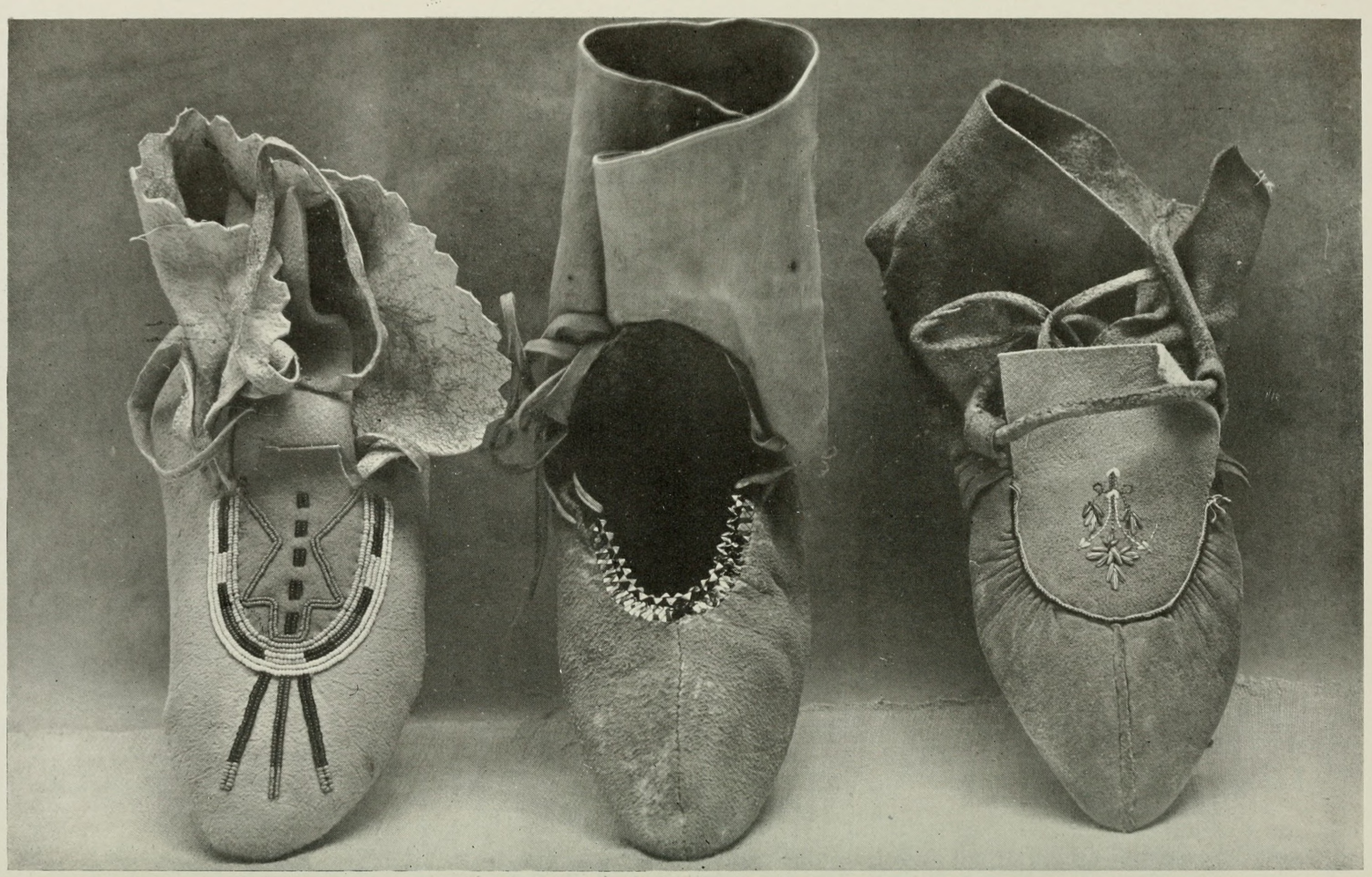
19th-century Moccasins of the Cree and Blackfoot, partially modified following first contact with Europeans

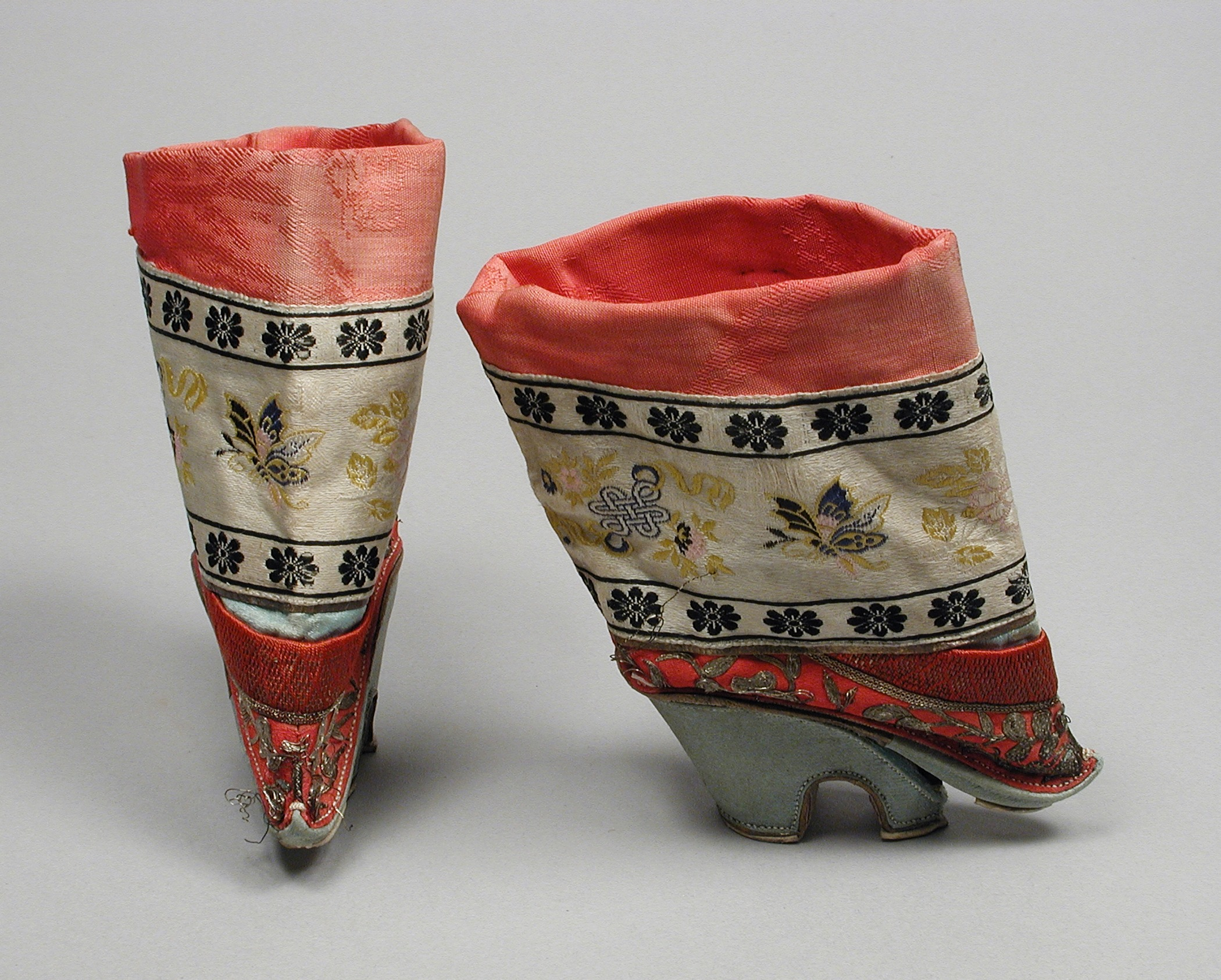
Qing-era lotus shoes, worn by Han women with bound feet

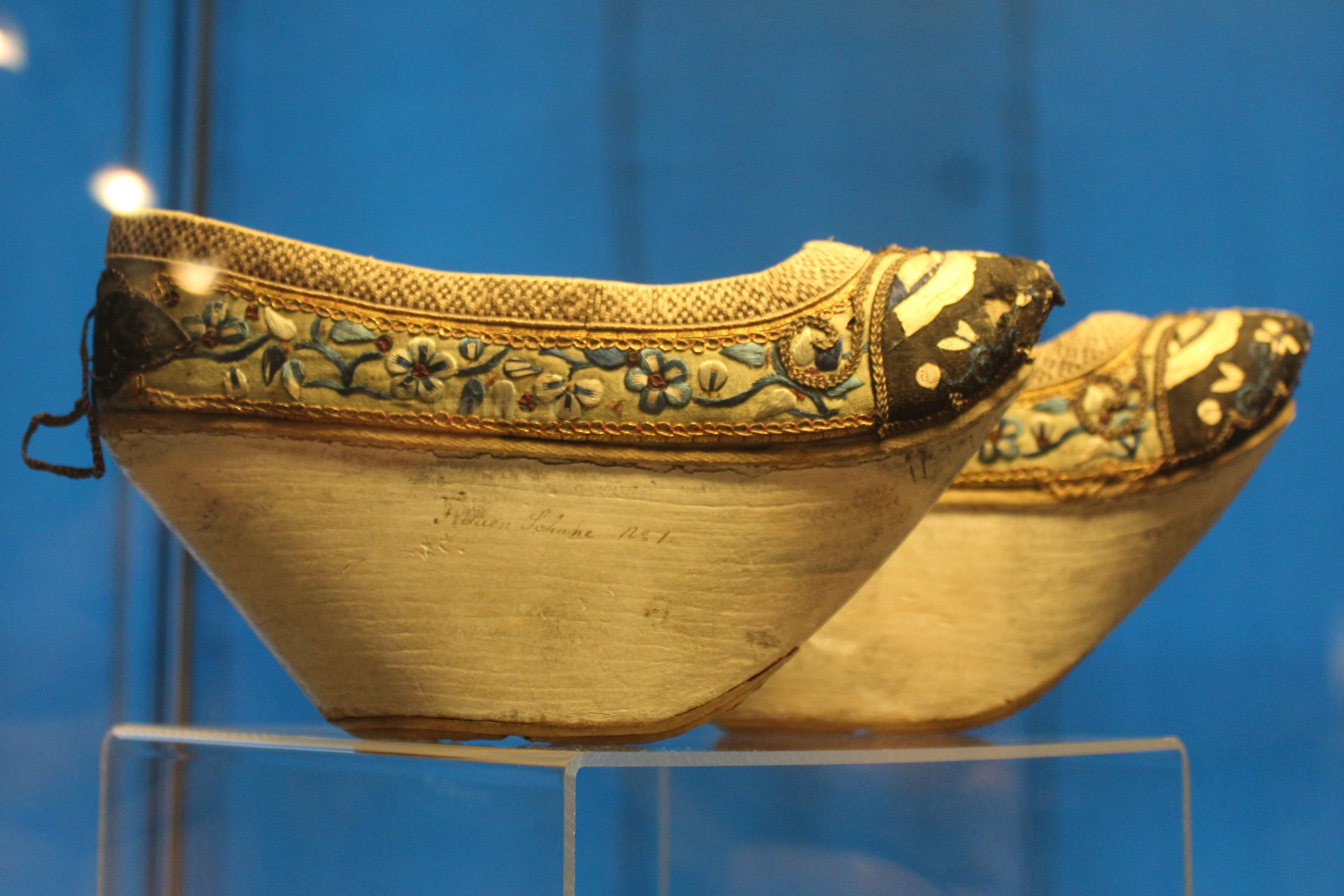
Manchu flowerpot shoes intended to mimic the same gait

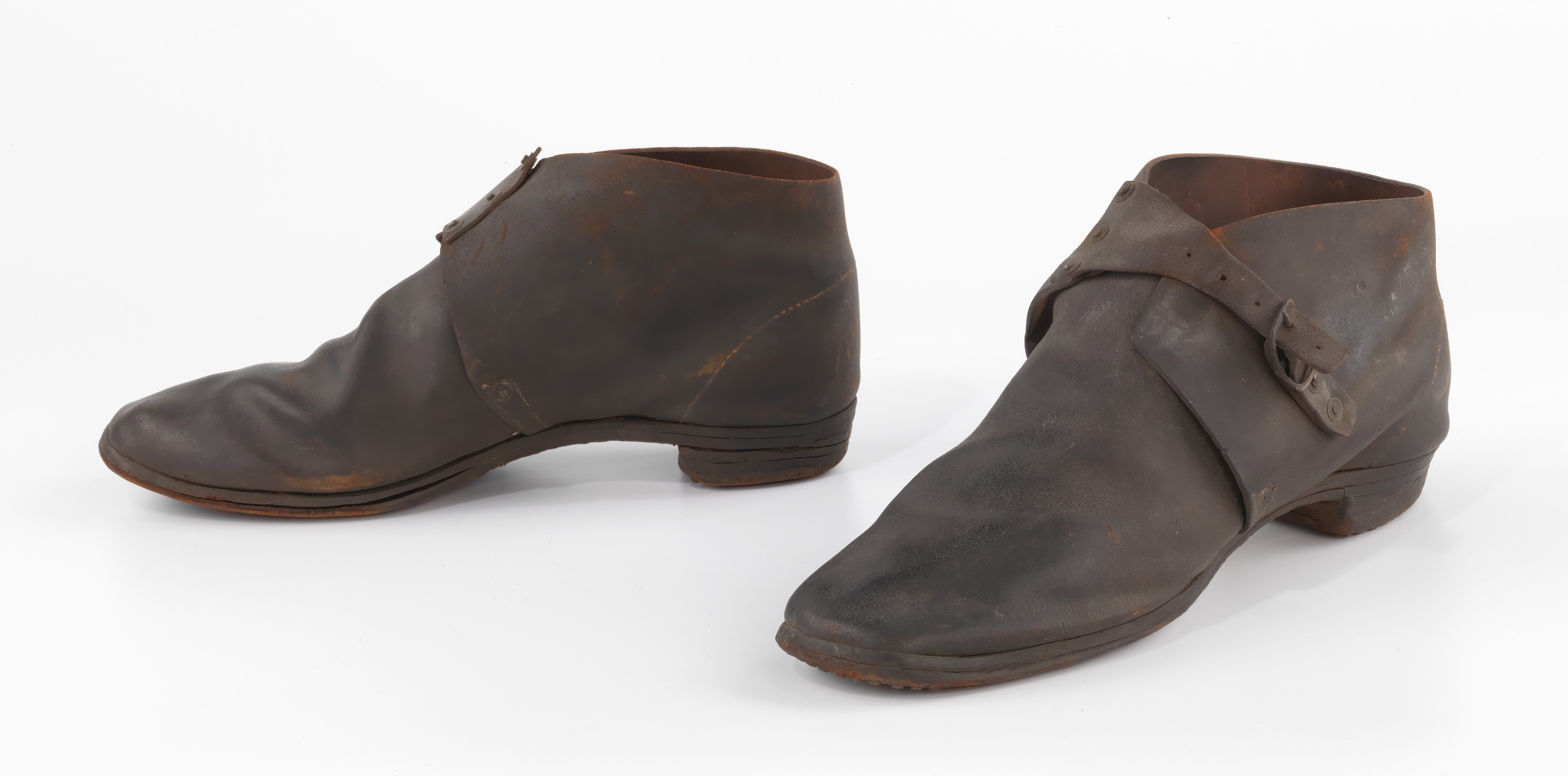
Brogans of the type worn by both sides of the American Civil War

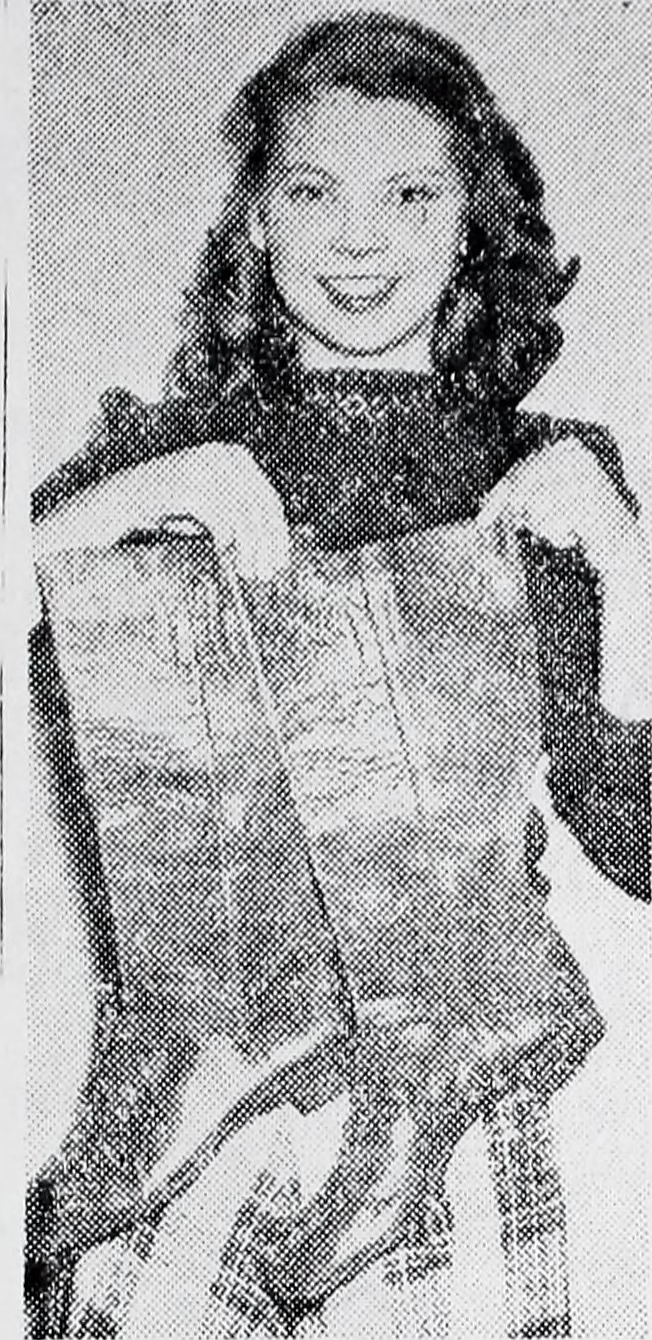
Boots supposedly worn by Abraham Lincoln at his assassination (1930s/40s)

Amid the Industrial Revolution, John Adam Dagyr's introduction of assembly line production and tight quality control to the "ten-footer" workshops in Lynn, Massachusetts, US, around 1760 is sometimes credited as the first shoe factory. However, although mechanized textile mills greatly reduced the price of proper socks, each step of the shoemaking process still needed to be done by hand in a slowly optimized putting-out system. The first mechanized systems—developed by Marc Isambard Brunel in 1810 to supply boots to the British Army amid the Napoleonic Wars—failed commercially as soon as the wars were over because the demobilized soldiers reduced the price of manual labor. John Nichols's 1850 adaptation of Howe and Singer's sewing machines to handle binding uppers to soles and the Surinamese immigrant Jan Ernst Matzeliger's 1880 invention of an automatic lasting machine finally allowed true industrialization, taking the productivity of individual workers from 20 or 50 pairs a day to as many as 700, halving prices, and briefly making Lynn the center of world shoe production. As late as 1865, most men in the industry identified in the census and city directory as general purpose "cordwainers" or "shoemakers"; by 1890, they were almost universally described as "shoe workers" or—more often—by the specific name of their work within the industry: "edgesetter", "heel trimmer", "McKay machine operator". Many were replaced by cheaper immigrants; the Czech Tomáš Baťa joined these workers at Lynn in 1904 and then returned to his own factory in Zlín, Moravia, mechanizing and rationalizing its production while guiding the factory town that developed into a garden city.

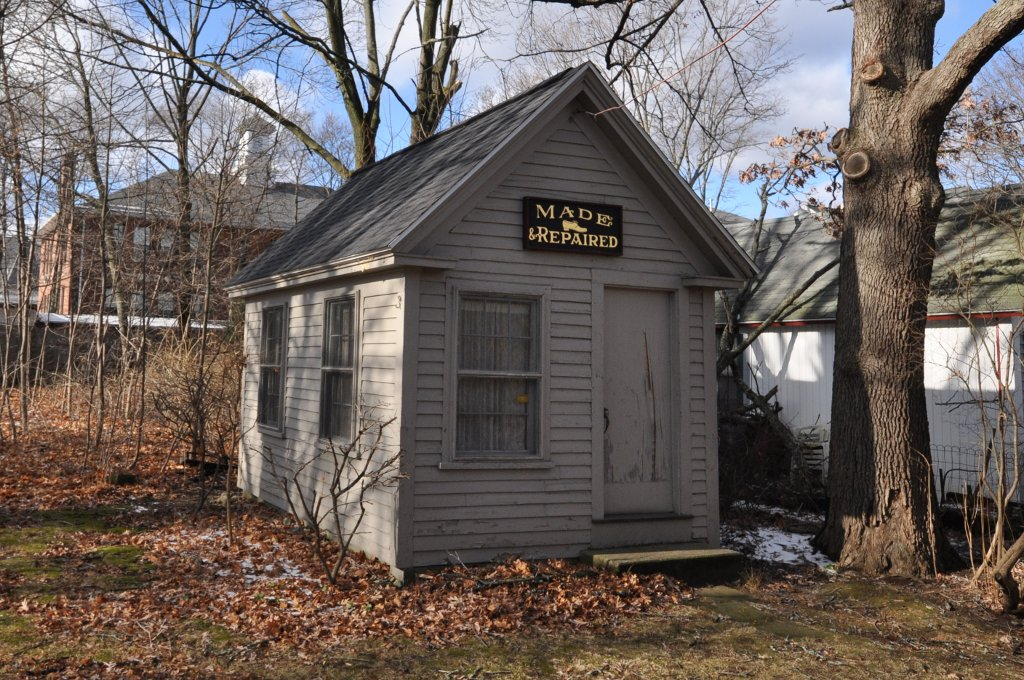
A preserved "ten footer" in Stoneham, Massachusetts (2013)

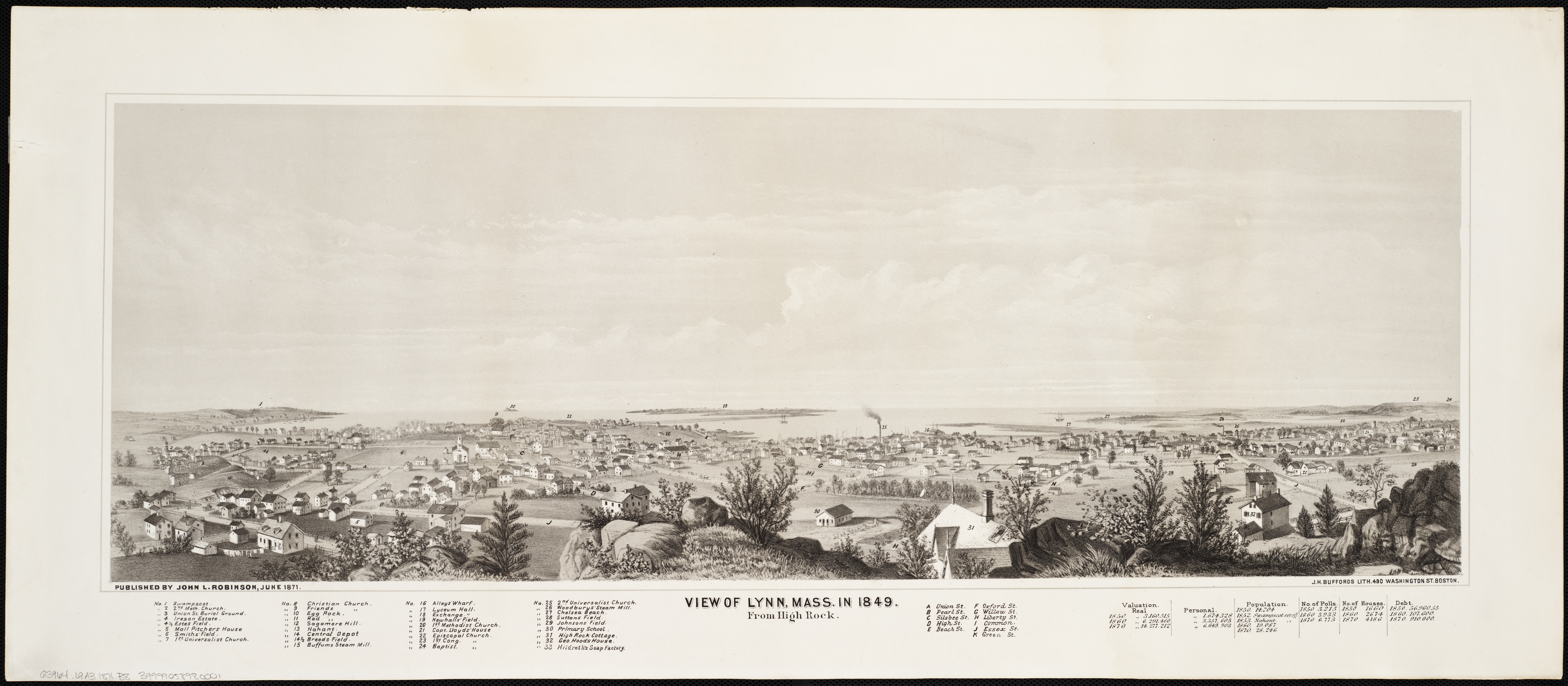
Lynn, Massachusetts, in 1849

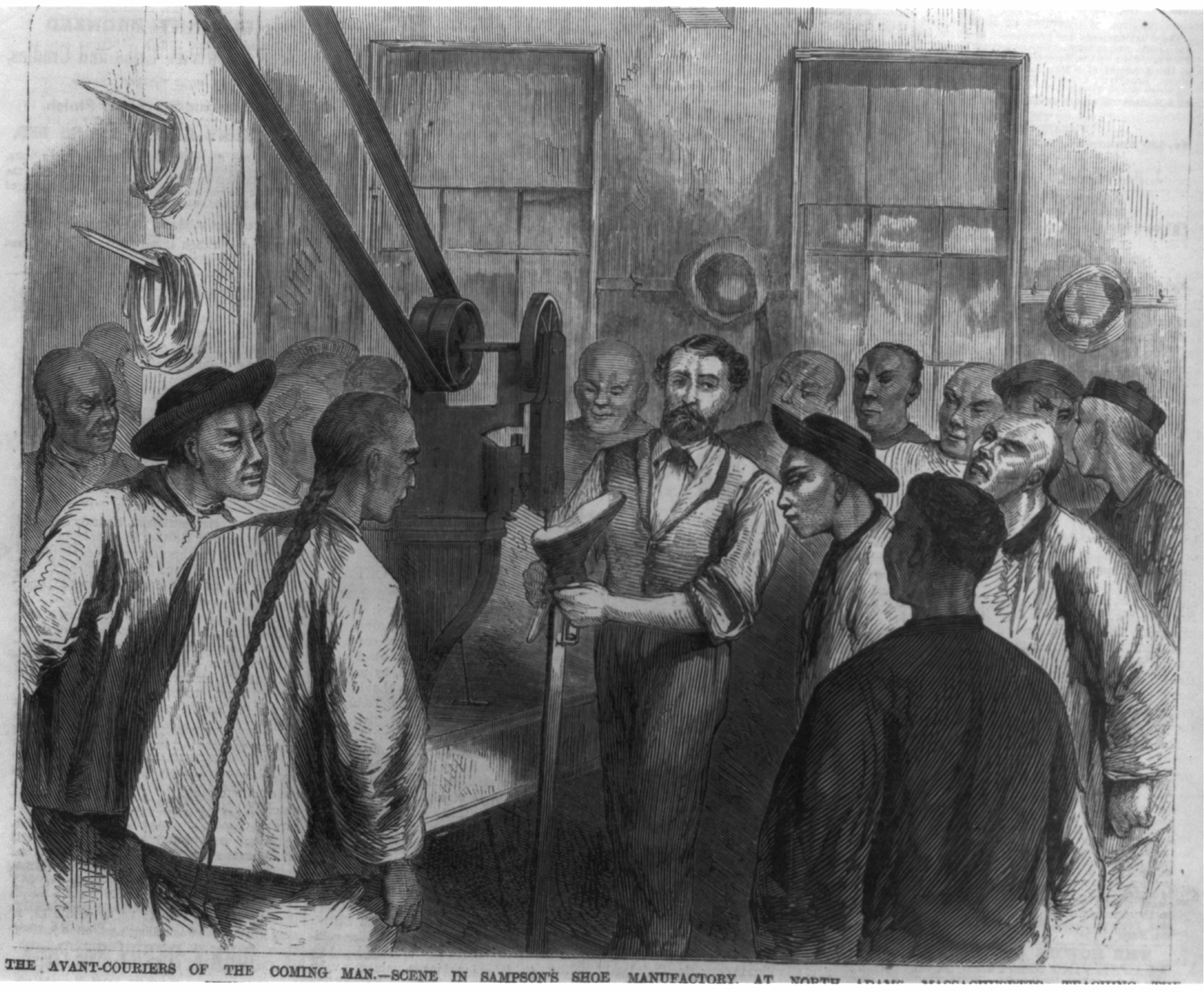
American shoemakers demonstrating machinery to visiting Chinese in 1870

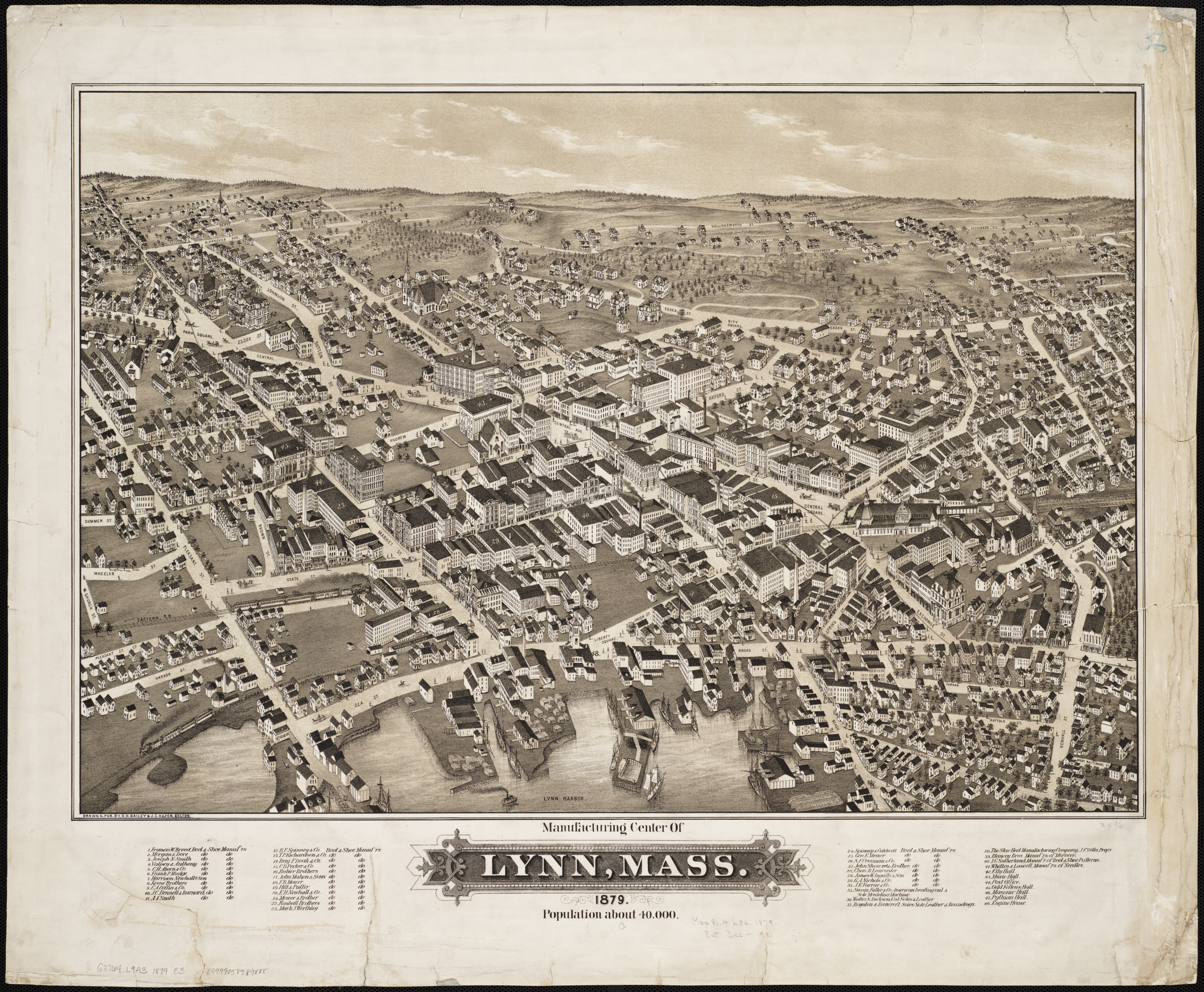
Lynn in 1879

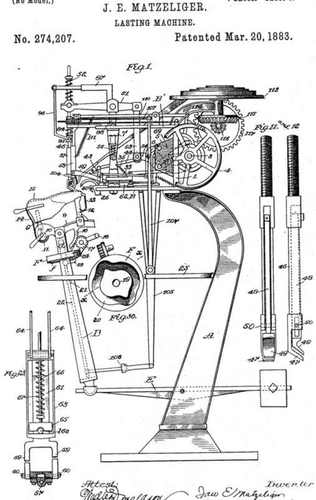
Matzeliger's automated laster

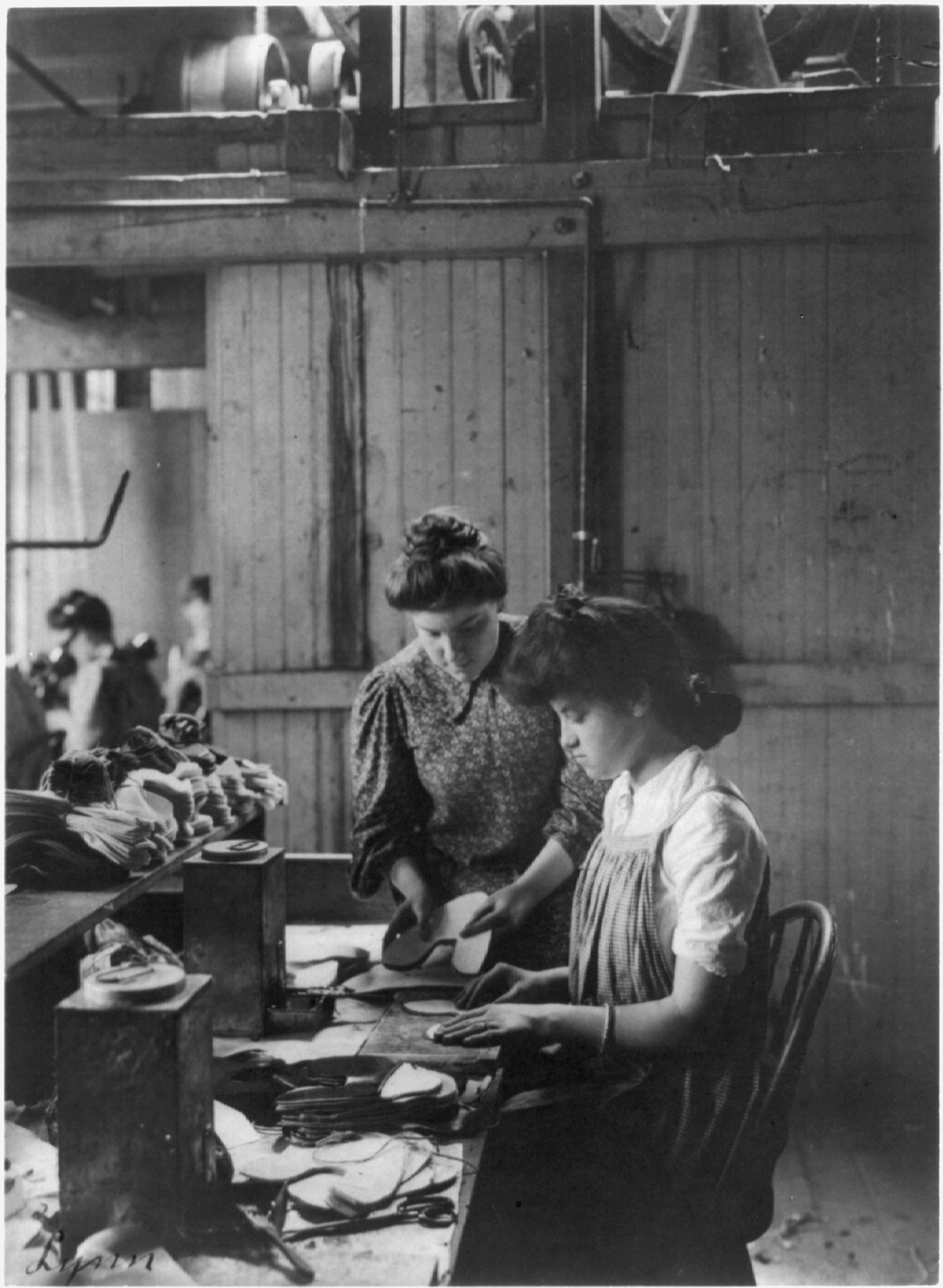
Women creating uppers in Lynn in 1895

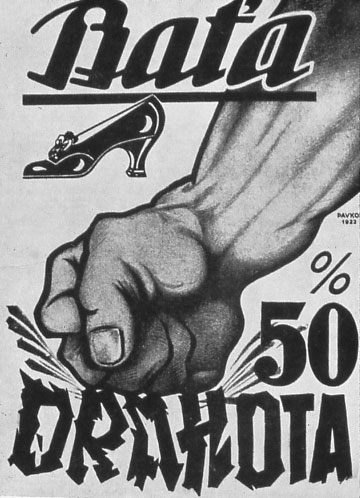
Bata advertisement for their half-price response to the 1920 Depression

By the early 20th century, vulcanization had led to the development of plimsolls, deck shoes, rubber boots, galoshes, and waders. The prevalence of trench foot in World War I focused attention on the importance of providing adequate footwear in following conflicts, although this was not always possible. Millions of Chinese soldiers in both the NRA and PLA were obliged to use straw and rope shoes to allow easy replacement on long marches during both World War II and the following civil war, contributing to disease and desertion, particularly among the Nationalists. Following the world wars, the increasing importance of professional sports greatly popularized a variety of athletic shoes, particularly sneakers. Major brands such as Converse, Adidas, and Nike used celebrity endorsements from Chuck Taylor, Michael Jordan, Lionel Messi, and others to promote their products. Fashion houses periodically prompted new trends in women's and high-end fashion. In particular, while working for Christian Dior, Roger Vivier popularized the stiletto heel in 1954. (Men's dress shoes have tended to retain 19th-century British looks such as the Oxford shoe and loafers.) Various subcultures have employed distinctive footwear as part of their identity, including winklepickers, Doc Martens, and skate shoes.

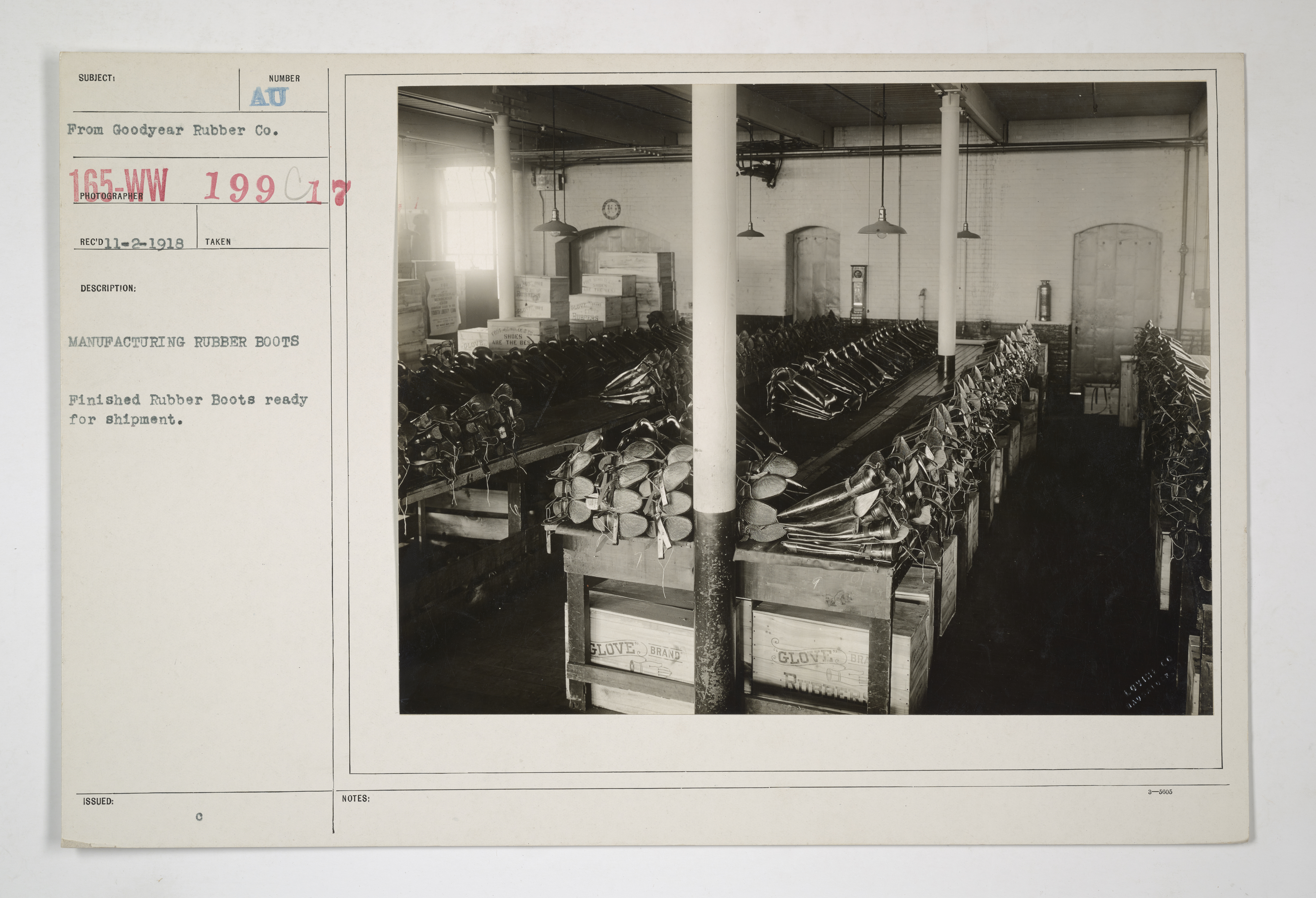
Rubber boots ready for shipment in 1917

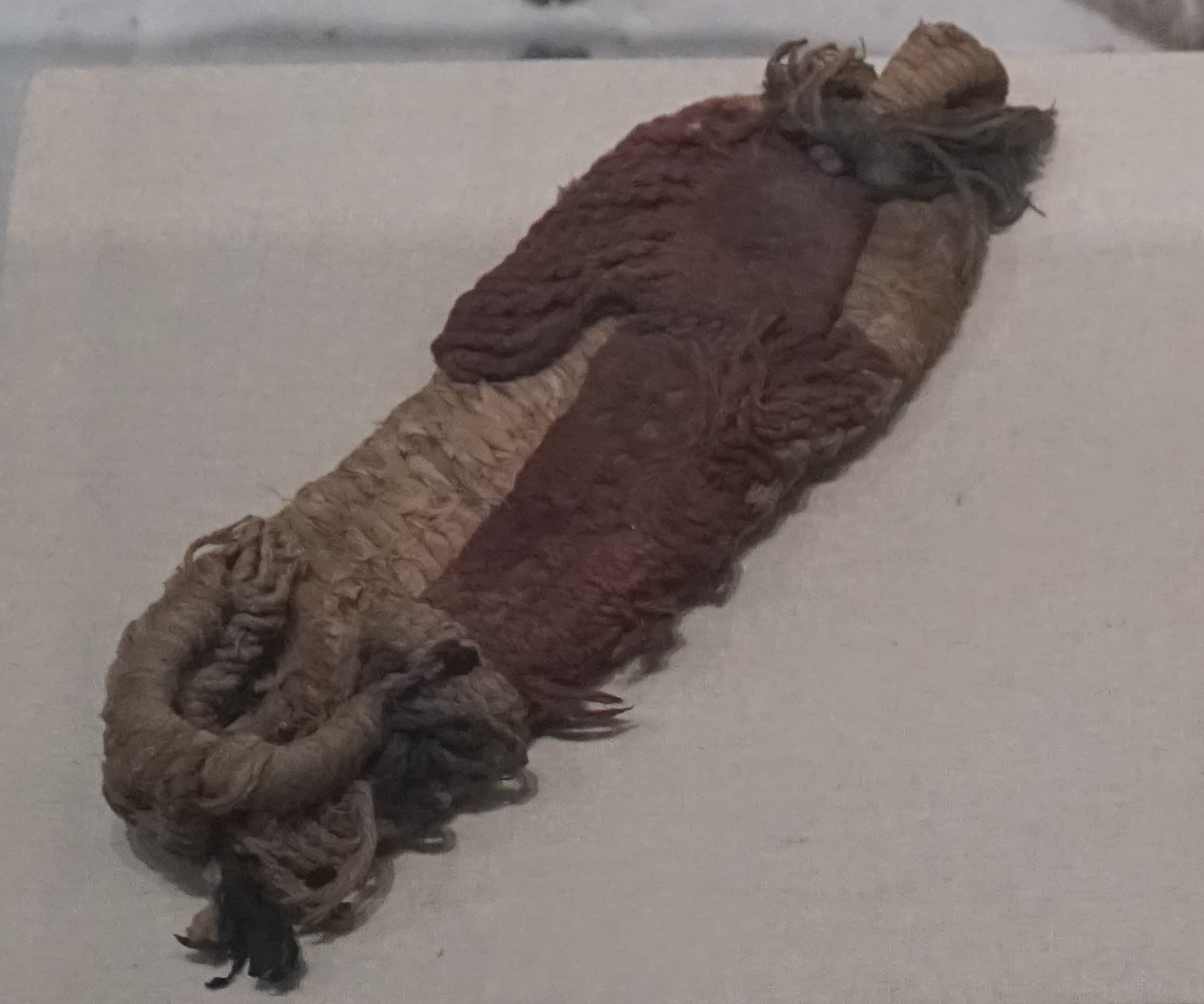
People's Liberation Army straw sandals at the Museum of the People's Revolution (2017)

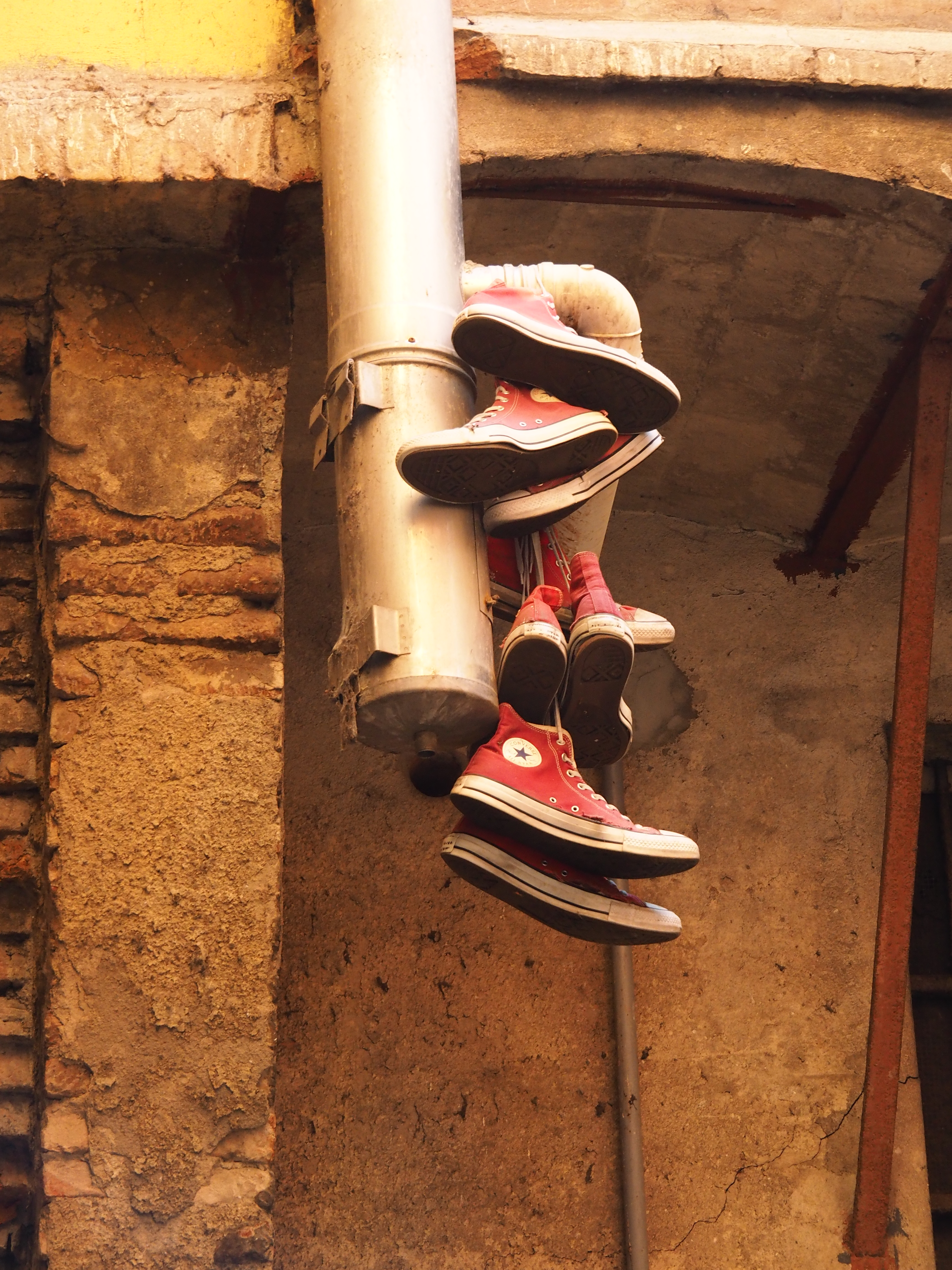
Tossed Chuck Taylor All-Stars in Italy (2018)

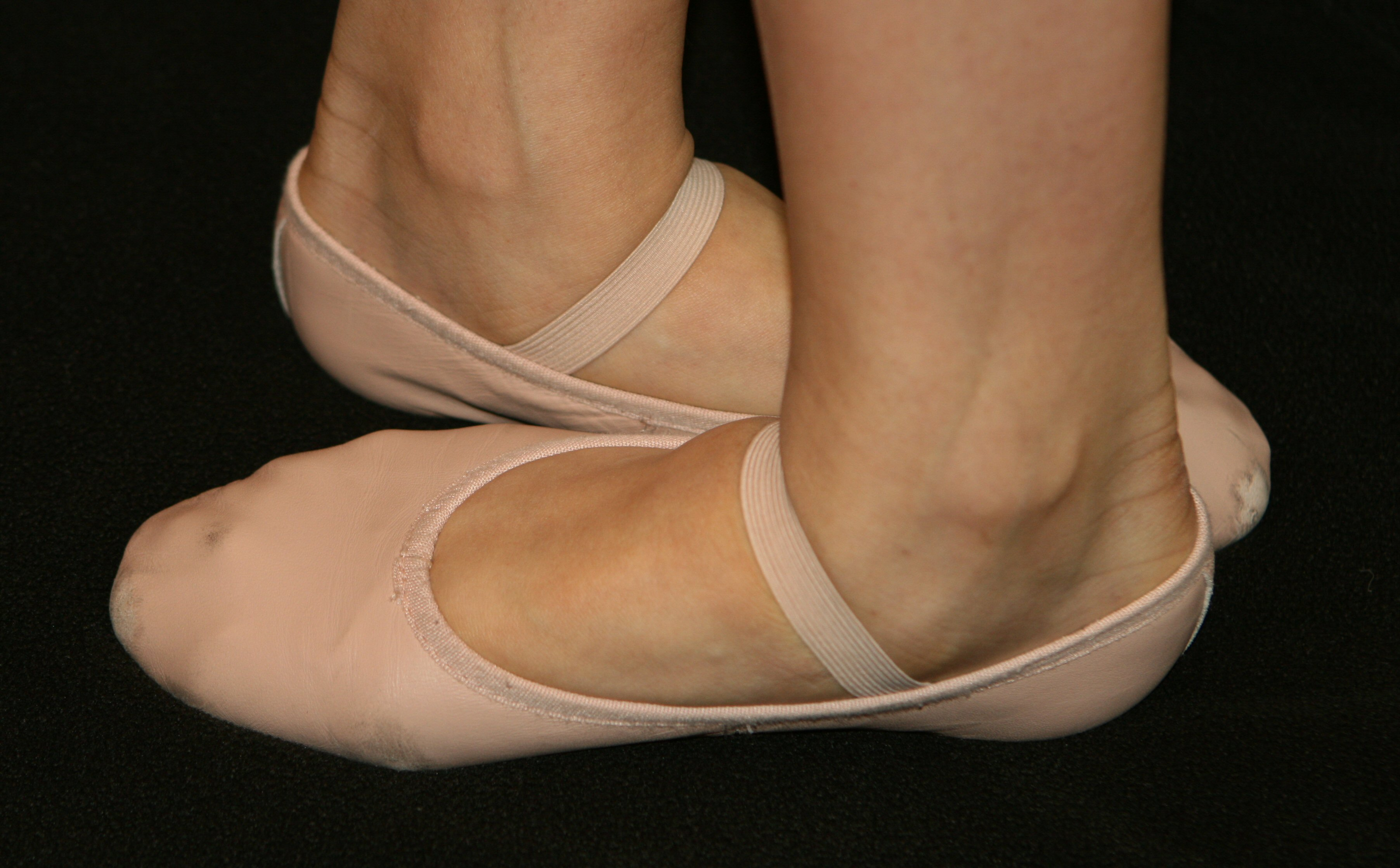
Ballet shoes (2008)

Soccer cleats, known in British as "football boots" (2018)

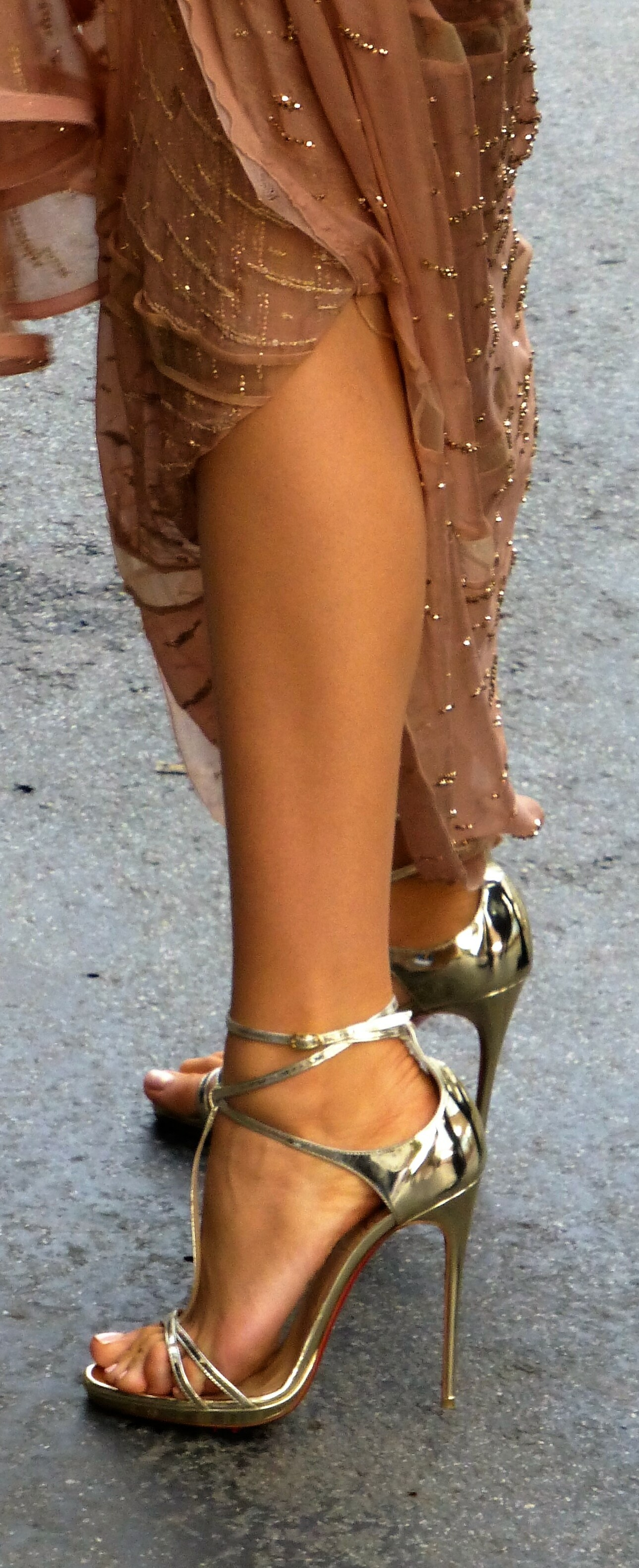
Stiletto heels at Cannes (2016)

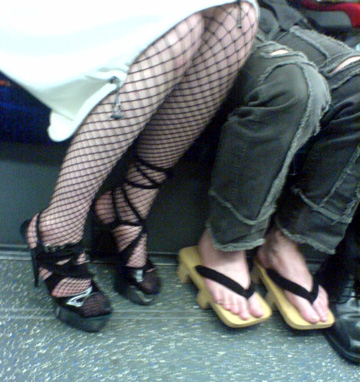
Platform heels and Japanese geta on the London Underground (2006)

The international trade in footwear was at first chiefly restricted to American exports to Europe and Europe's exports to its various colonial empires. Assisted by the Marshall Plan after World War II, Italy became the major shoe exporting country in the 1950s. It was joined in the 1960s by Japan, which offshored its production to Taiwan, South Korea, and Hong Kong as its own labor became too expensive. In their turn, the Hong Kong manufacturers began moving production to Guangdong in mainland China almost immediately after the establishment of Deng Xiaoping's Opening Up Policy in the early 1980s. Competitors were soon forced to follow suit, including removal of Taiwanese and Korean production to Fujian and to Wenzhou in southern Zhejiang. Similarly, amid Perestroika and the Fall of Communism, Italy dismantled its domestic industry, outsourcing its work to Eastern Europe, which proved less dependable than the Chinese and further eroded their market share. Beginning around the year 2000, China has constantly produced more than half of the world's shoes. As of 2021, footwear is the 30th most traded category internationally; but, while China produces well over 60% of exported footwear, it currently earns less than 36% of the value of the total trade owing to the continuing importance of American, German, and other brands in the North American and European markets.

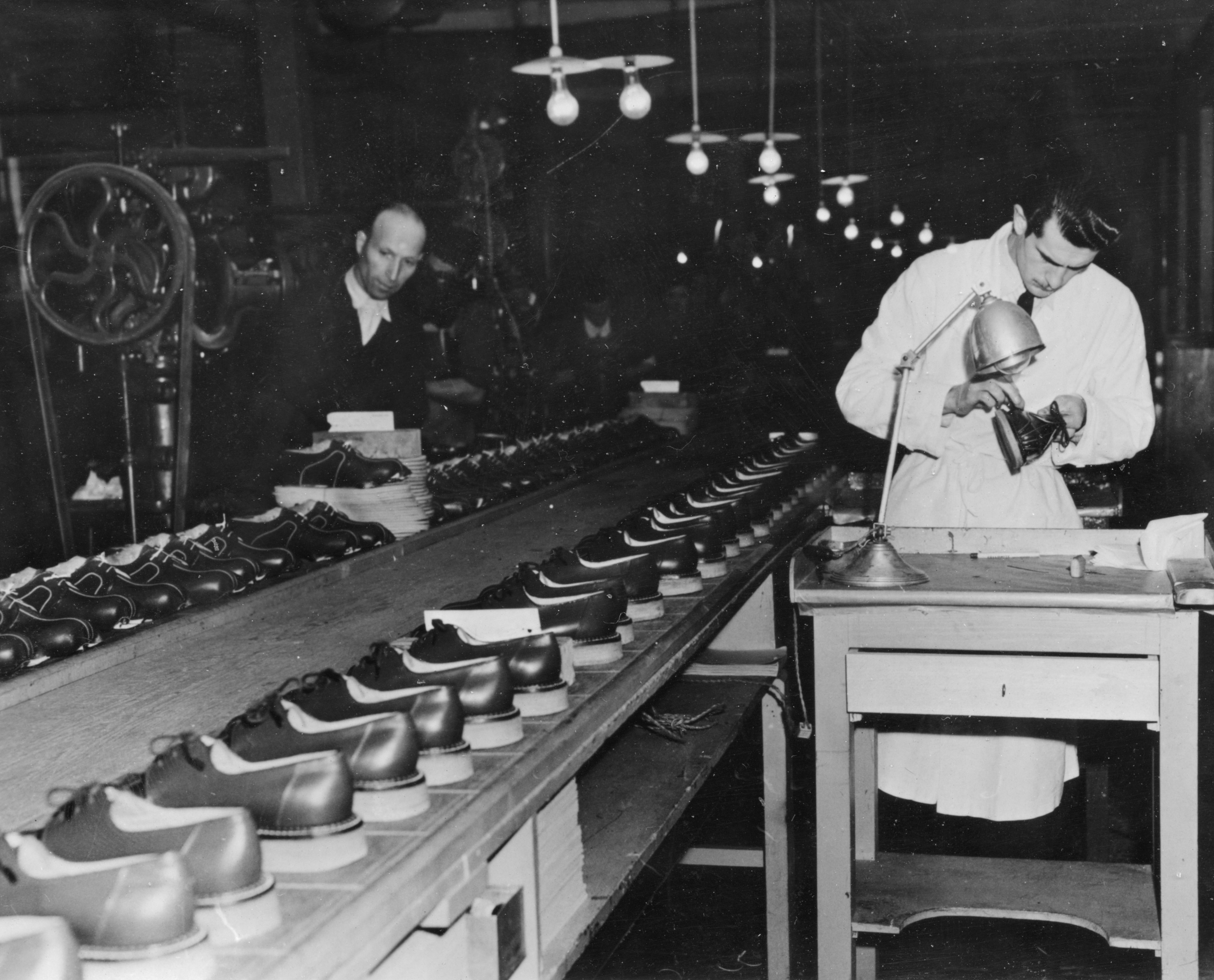
Assembly line in a French shoe factory (1948)

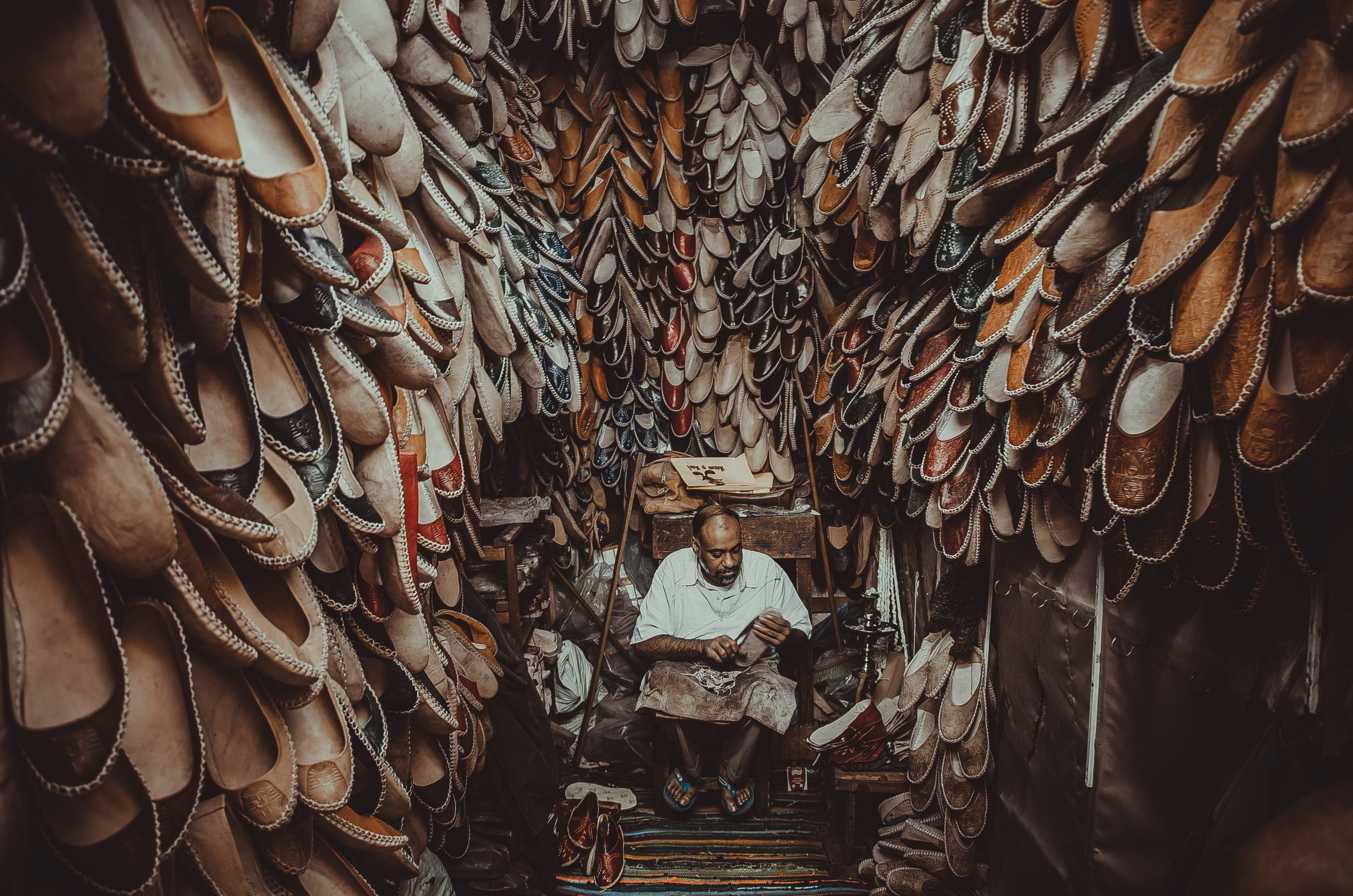
A cobbler in Cairo, Egypt (2015)

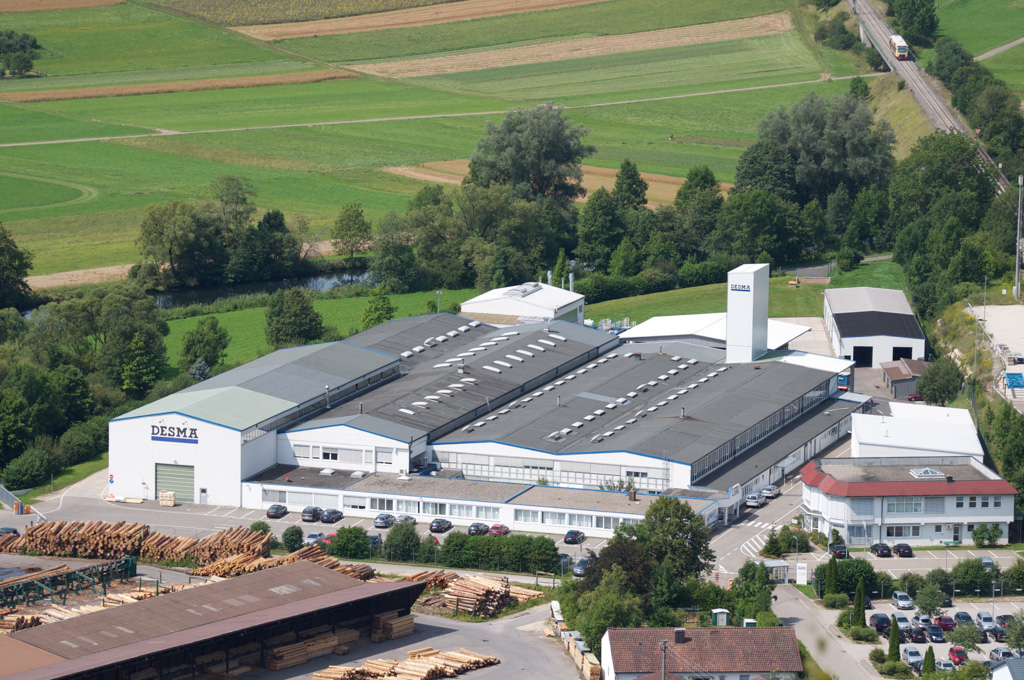
A shoe factory in Fridingen, Germany (2016)

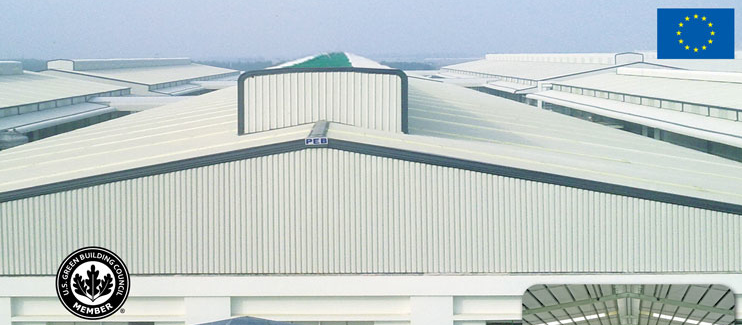
Nike factory in Vietnam (2016)

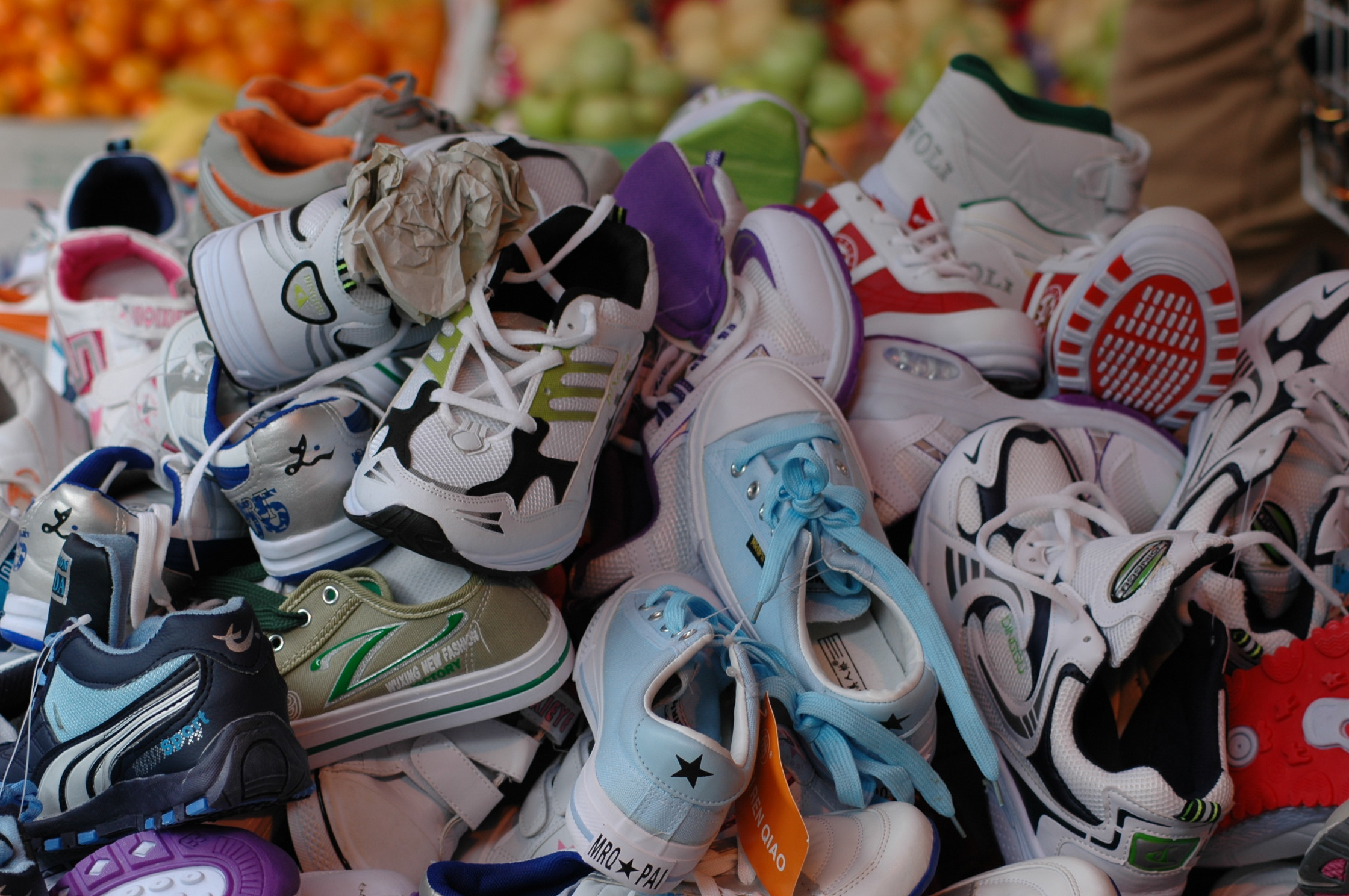
Shoes and fruit at a Hong Kong market (2007)

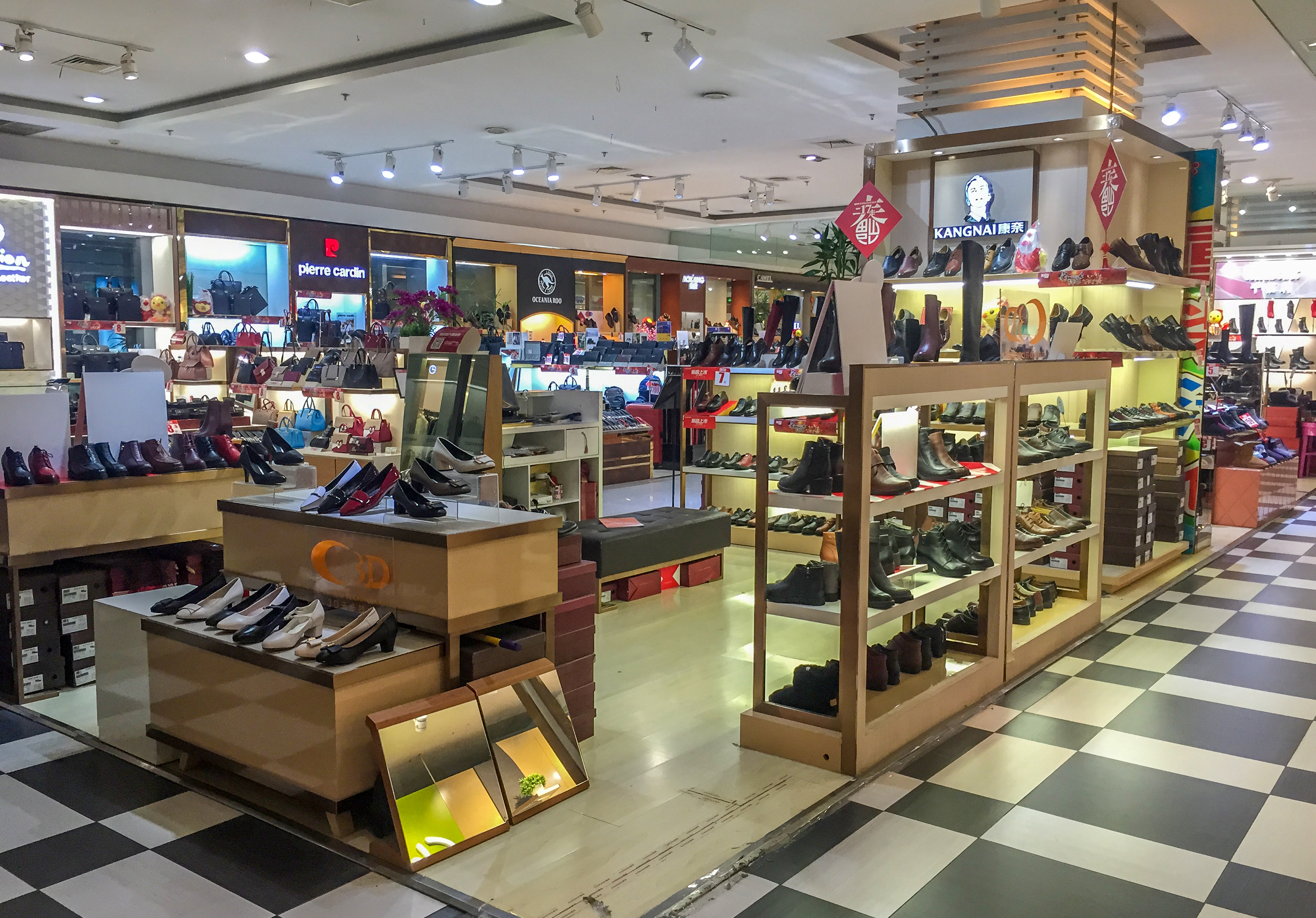
Shoe store in a Beijing mall (2017)

== Materials ==
Modern footwear is usually made of leather or plastic, and rubber. In fact, leather was one of the original materials used for the first versions of a shoe. The soles can be made of rubber or plastic, sometimes with the addition of a sheet of metal on the inside. Roman sandals had sheets of metal on their soles so that they would not bend out of shape.

In more recent times, footwear suppliers such as Nike have begun to source environmentally friendly materials.

== Components ==
Typical shoe component location and nomenclature.

- Adhesives
- Buckle
- Counter (footwear): Backstay fitting between upper and lining in heel area and giving structure to back of shoe and supporting ankle.
- Eyelet
- Heel
- Hook
- Insole
- Outsole
- Laces
- Shank
- Sole
- Tack
- Tongue (footwear): Part of shoe covering top of foot underneath laces
- Tread
- Welt

== Types ==
=== Boots ===
- Chukka boots
- Combat boots
- Cowboy boots
- Derby boots
- Fashion boots
- Go-go boots
- Hiking boots
- Motorcycle boots
- Mukluk
- Platform boots
- Riding boots
- Russian boots
- Seaboots
- Tabi boots
- Tanker boots
- Thigh-high boots
- Valenki
- Veldskoen
- Waders
- Wellington boots
- Winklepickers

=== Shoes ===
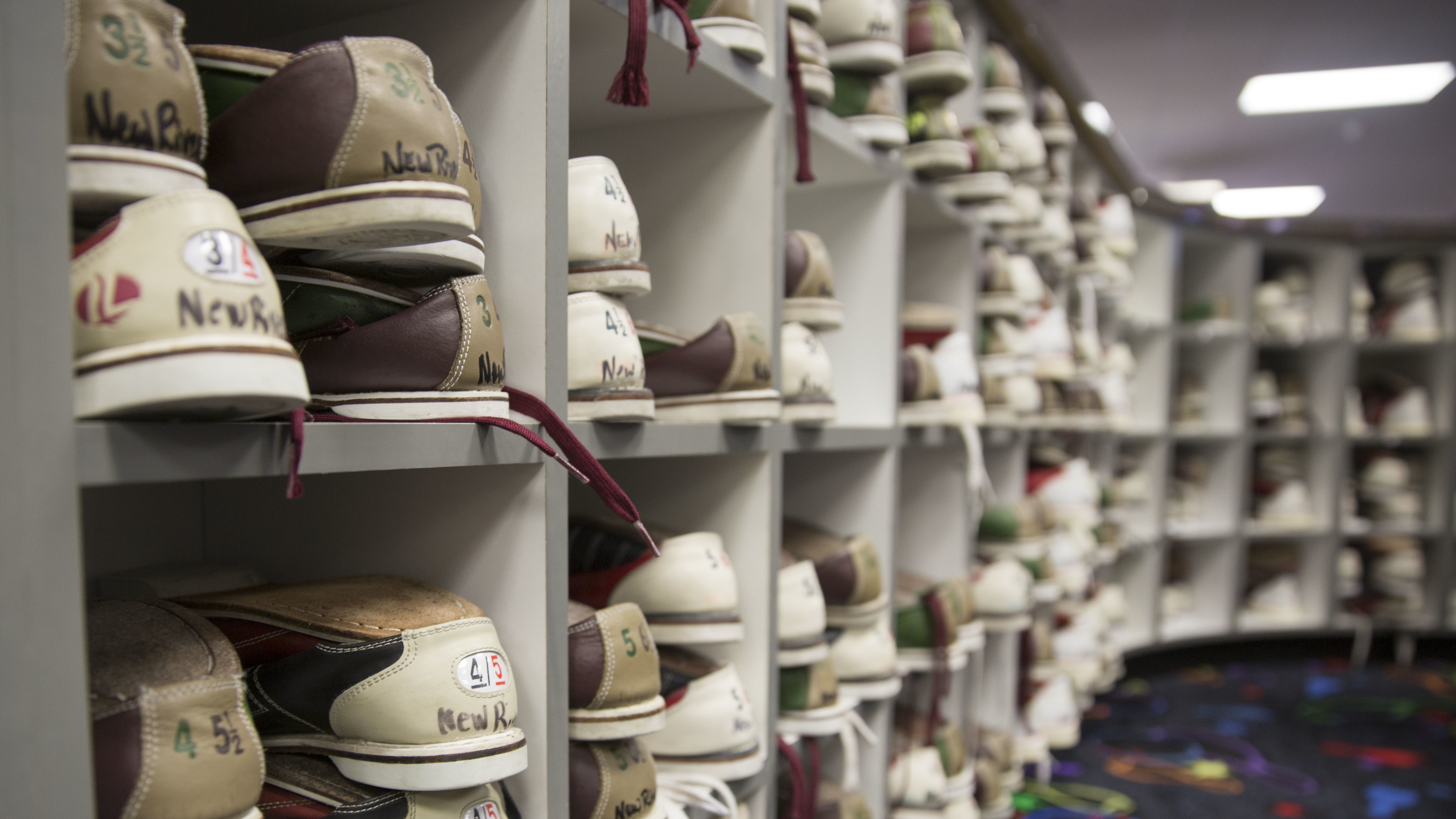
Bowling shoes are a type of athletic shoe

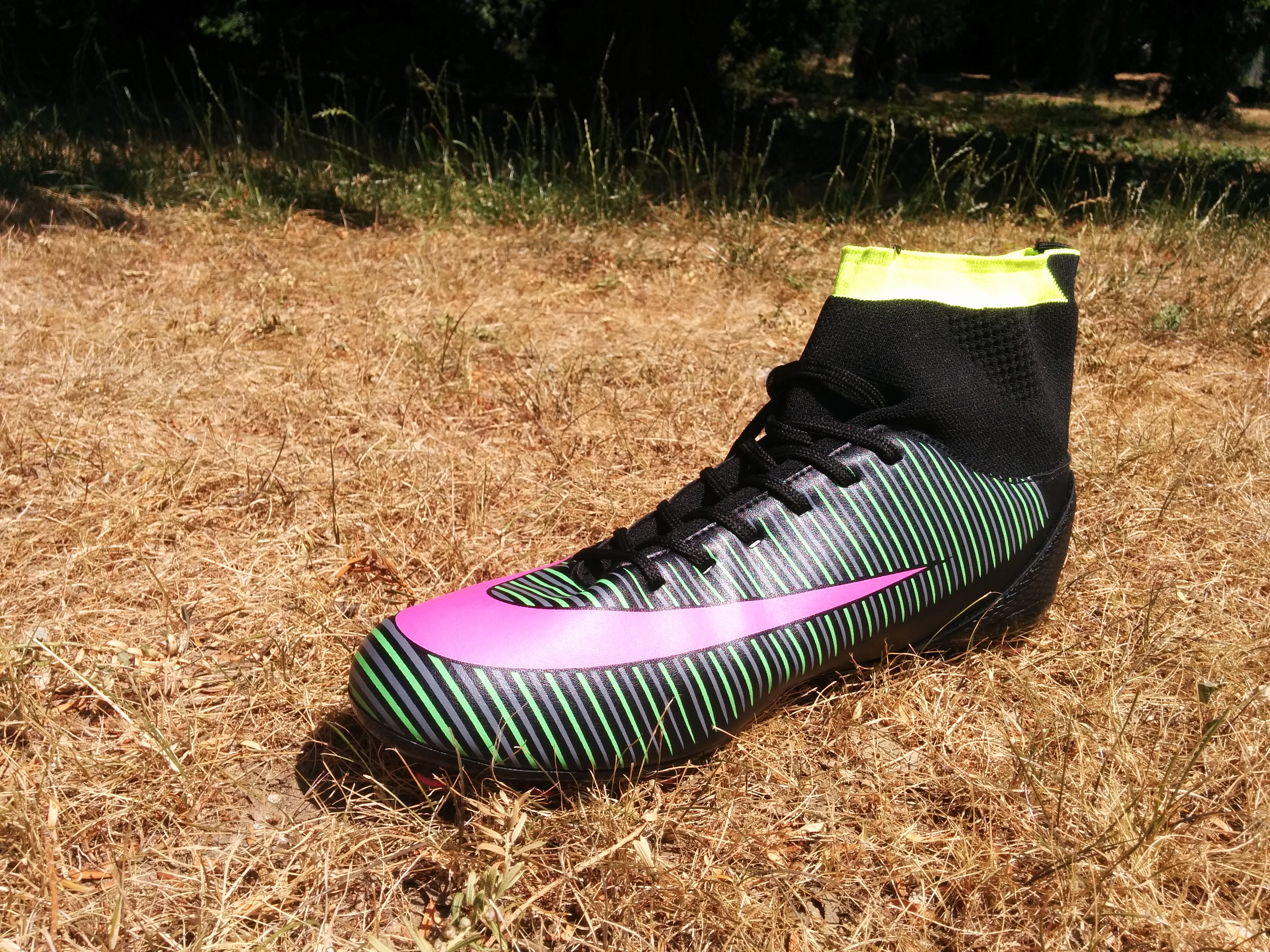
A football boot based upon a common design used in 2018. Note the absence of a leather tongue, the relatively low rear upper around the heel, and the presence of a sock style fastener. This design helps to ensure maximum flexibility and range of movement. By limiting the potential impingement of the ankle joint by the boot upper, it allows the wearer's gait to be more natural.

- Athletic shoes (also known as trainers or sneakers)
- Ballet flats
- Boat shoes
- Brothel creepers
- Court shoes (known in the US as pumps)
- Espadrilles
- Galoshes
- Kitten heels
- Lace-up shoes
  - Derby shoes
  - Oxford shoes
  - Brogues
  - Blucher shoes
- High-tops
- Loafers
- Mary Janes
- Moccasins
- Monks
- Mules
- Platform shoes
- Plimsoll shoes
- School shoes
- Skate shoes
- Tap shoes
- Toe shoes

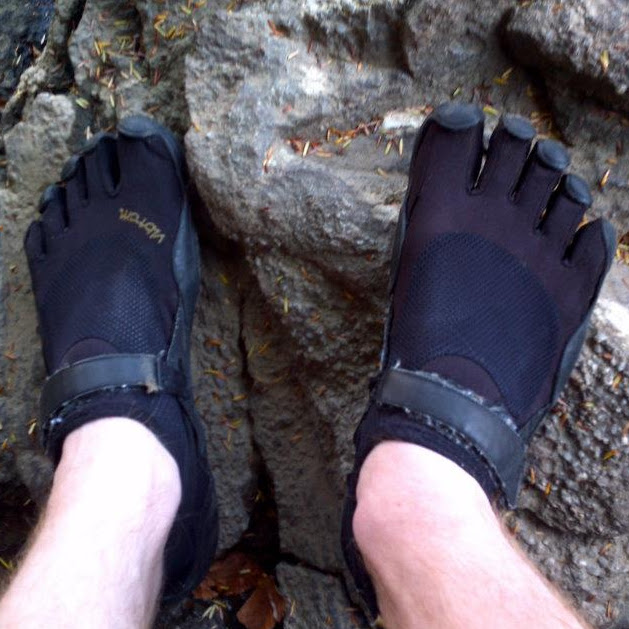
Vibram FiveFingers toe shoes

=== Sandals ===
- Sandals
  - Kolhapuri Chappals
  - Peshawari chappal
  - Flip-flops (thongs)
  - Slide
  - Wörishofer
  - Avarca, from Balearic Islands
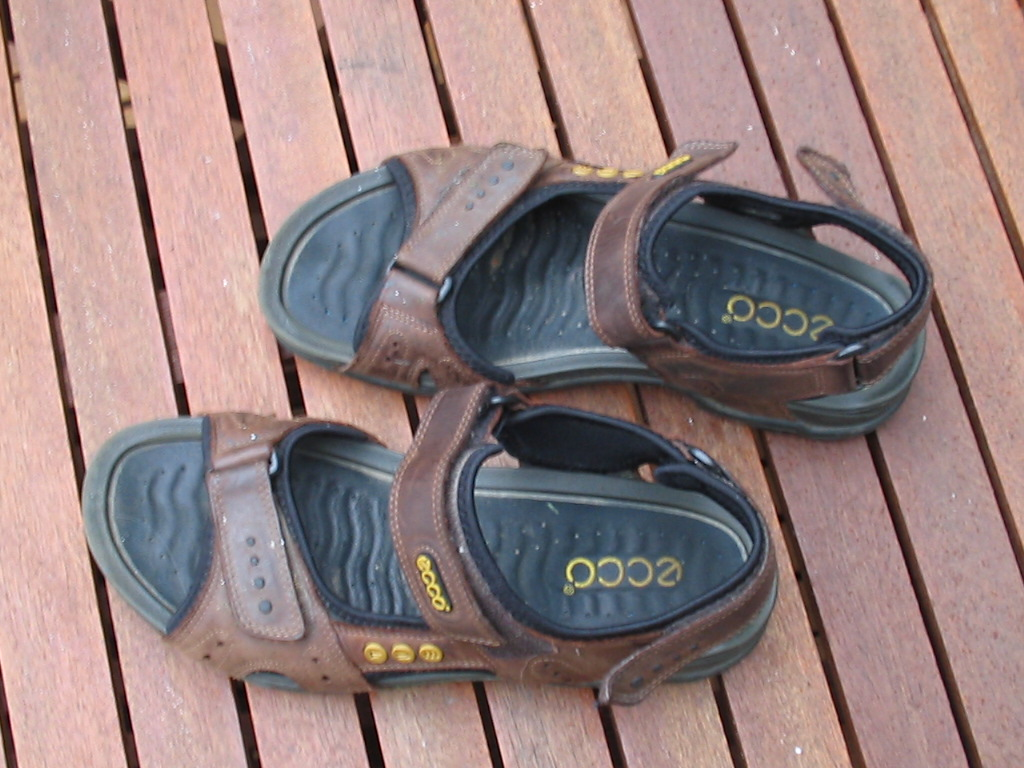
    A pair of Sandals

=== Slippers ===
- Slippers
  - Closed slippers
  - Open slippers

=== Specific footwear ===
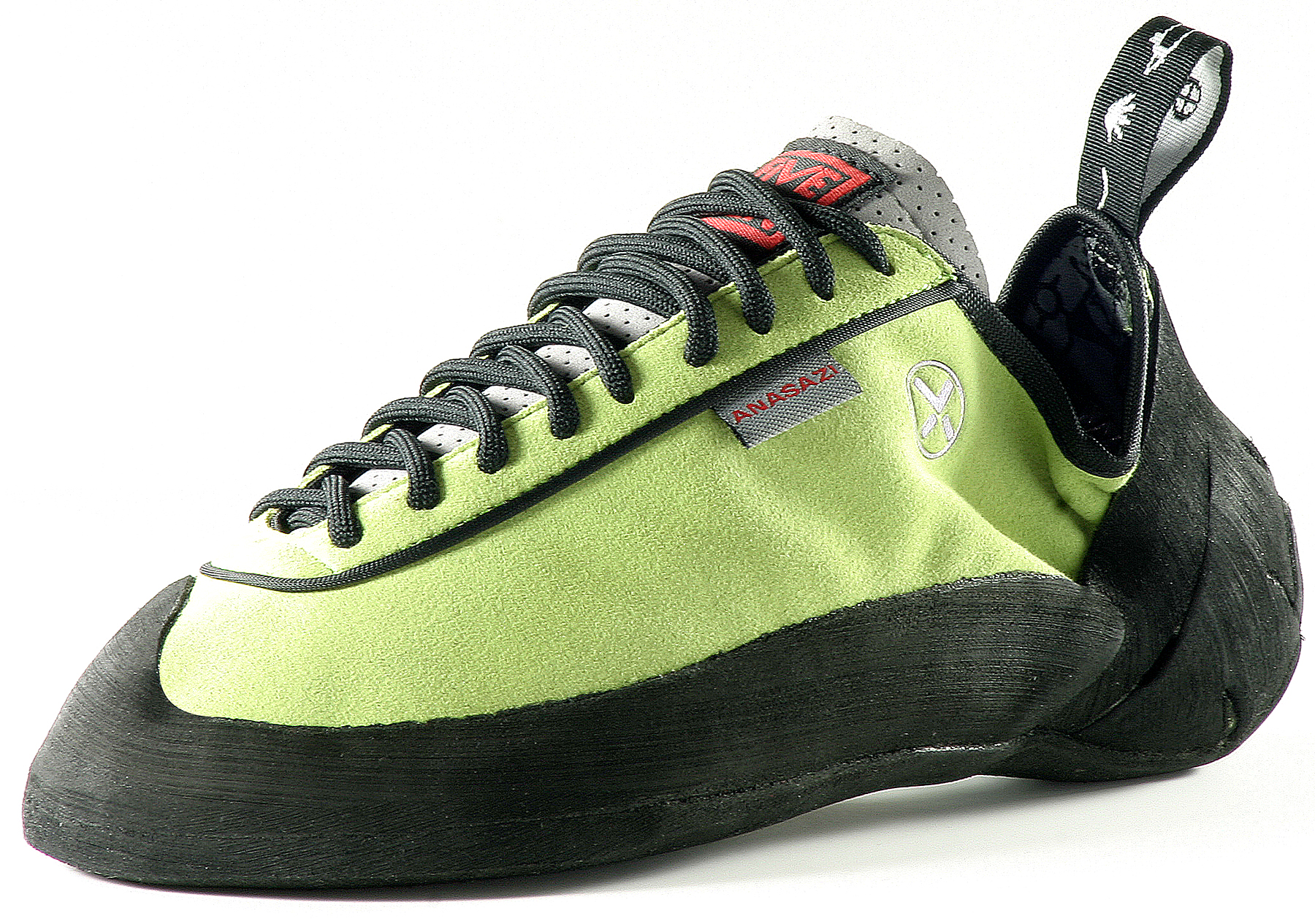
A climbing shoe

- Ballet shoes
- High-heeled footwear
- Climbing shoes
- Clogs
- Cleats
  - Football boots
  - Track spikes
  - Golf spikes
- Crocs
- Diabetic shoes
- Minimalist shoe
- Sabaton
- Sailing boots
- Skates
  - Ice skates
  - Inline skates
  - Roller skates
- Ski boots
- Snowshoes
- Spats
- Steel-toe boot
- Surgical shoe
- Pointe shoes
- Swimfins (flippers)

=== Traditional footwear ===
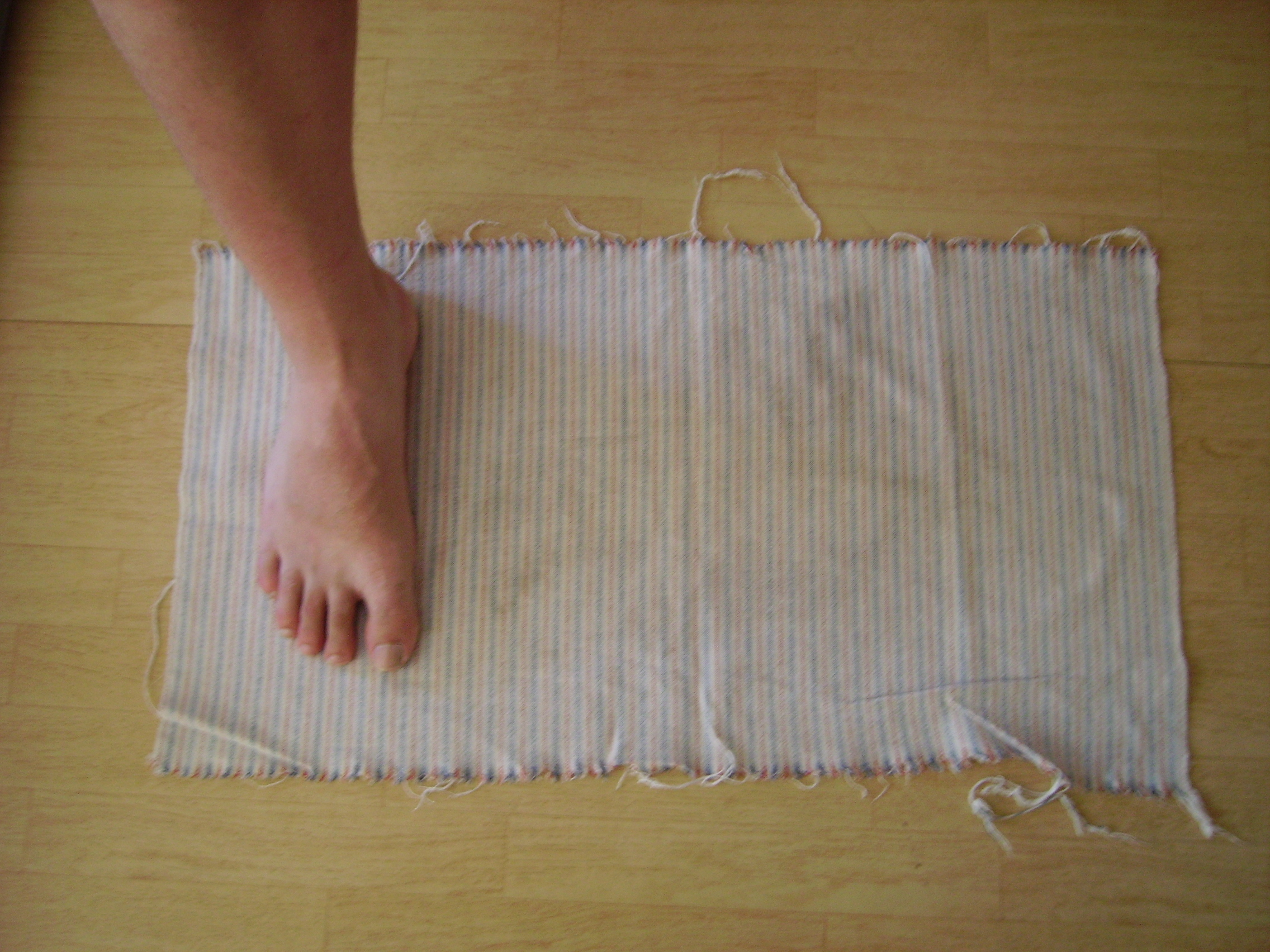
Footwraps used by the Finnish Army until the 1990s

- Abarka, of leather, from Pyrenees
- Areni-1 shoe, 5,500-year-old leather shoe found in Armenia
- Bast shoe, of bast, from Northern Europe
- Crakow, shoes from Poland with long toes popular in the 15th century
- Galesh, of textile, from Iran
- Geta, of wood, from Japan
- Klompen, of wood, from the Netherlands
- Opanci, of leather, from Balkans
- Pampooties, of hide, from Ireland

=== Socks ===
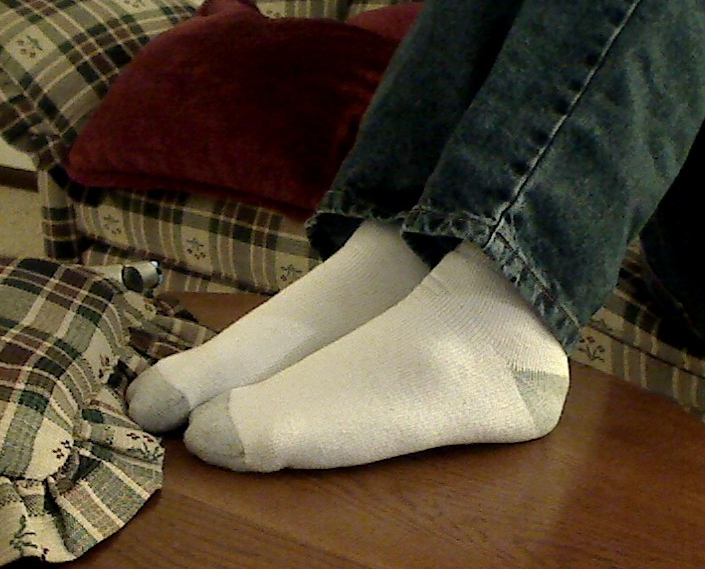
Socks

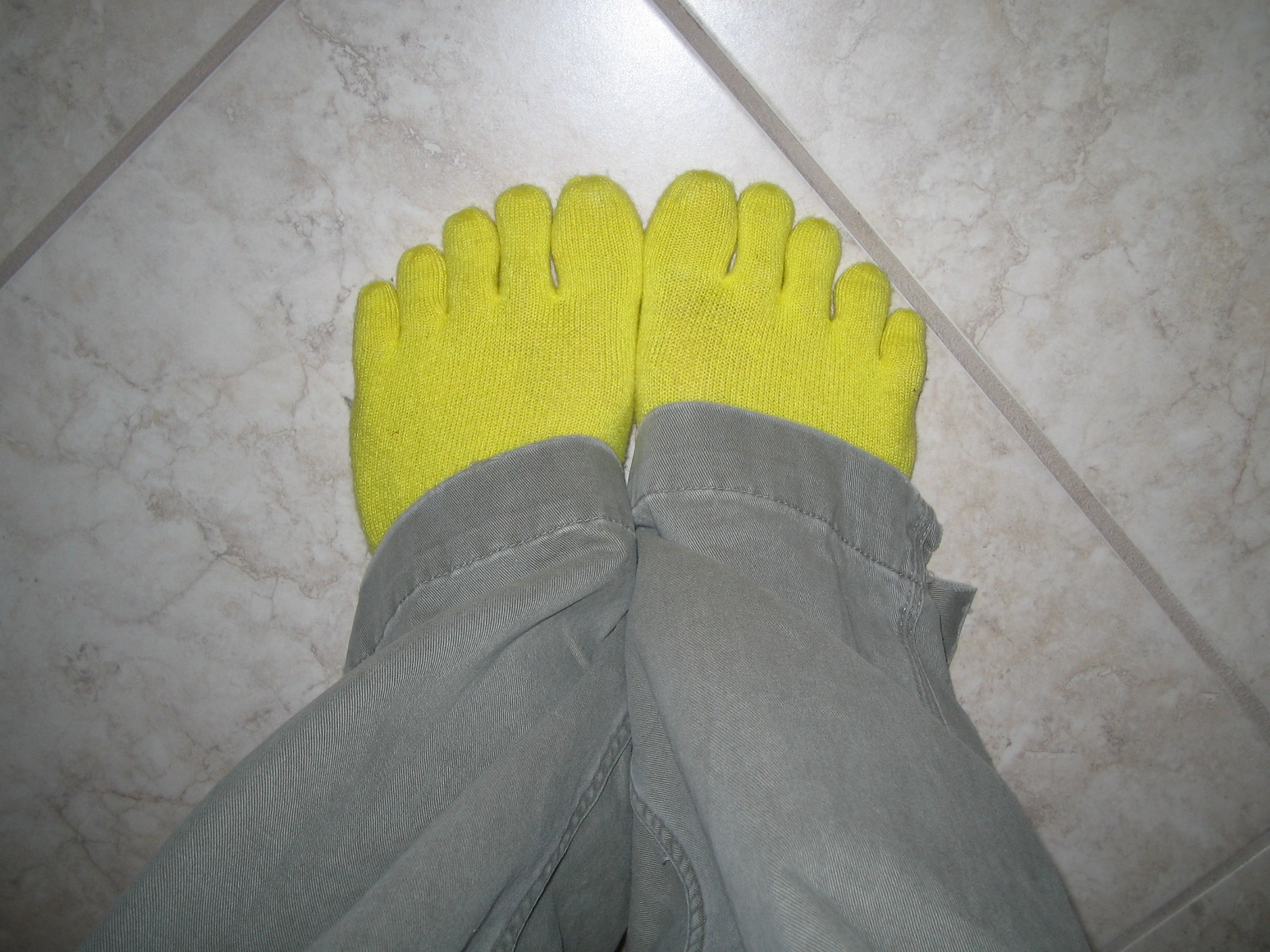
Toe socks

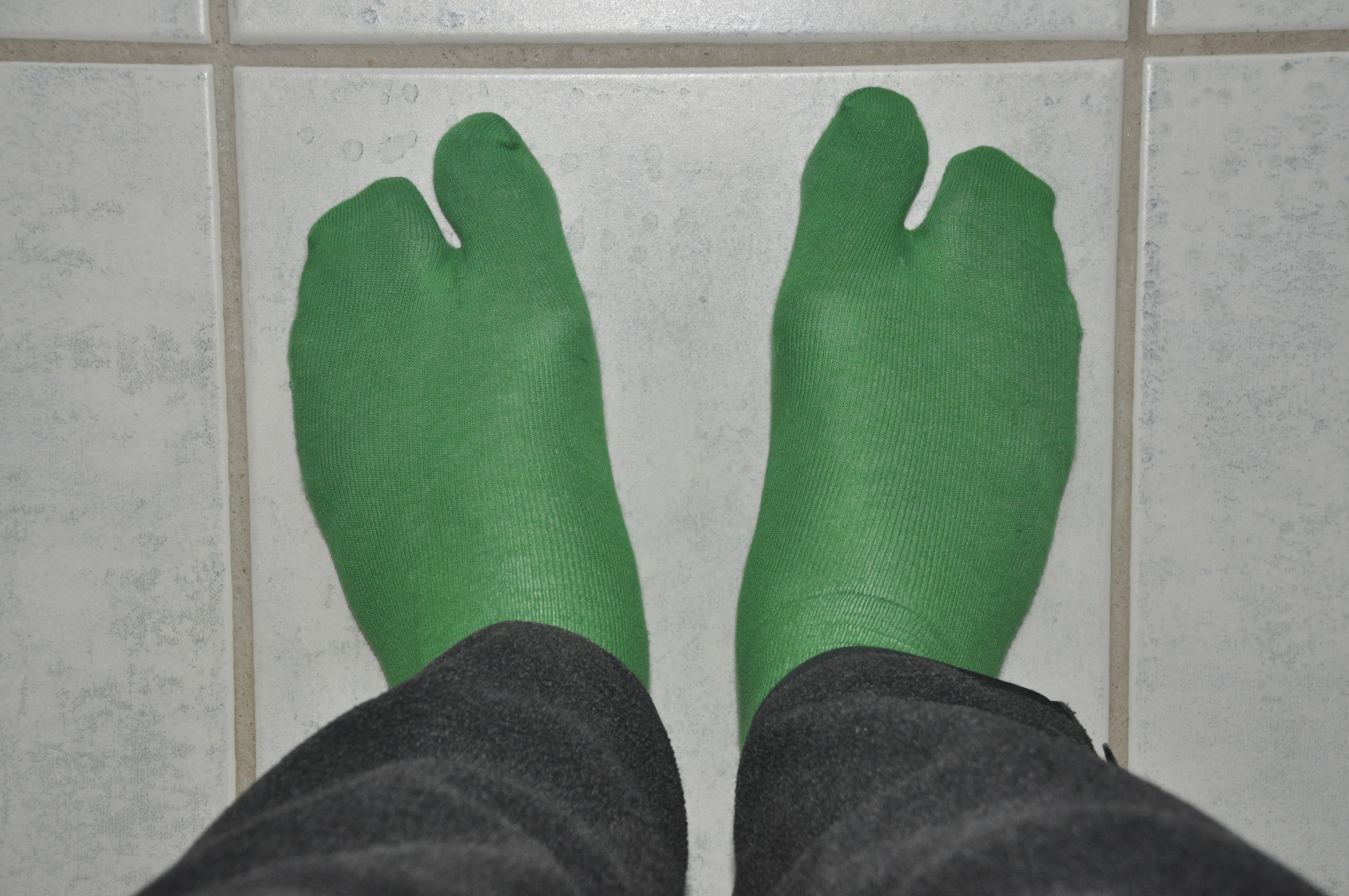
Tabi

- Socks
  - Anklets
  - Bobby socks
  - Diabetic socks
  - Dress socks
  - Footwraps
  - Knee highs
  - Toe socks

== Footwear industry ==
In Europe, recent decades have seen a decline in the footwear industry. While about 27,000 firms were in business in 2005, only 21,700 remained in 2009. Not only have these firms decreased in number, but direct employment has also reduced within the sector.

In the U.S., the annual footwear industry revenue was $48 billion in 2012. In 2015, there were about 29,000 shoe stores in the U.S. and the shoe industry employed about 189,000 people. Due to rising imports, these numbers are also declining. The only way of staying afloat in the shoe market is to establish a presence in niche markets.

== Safety of footwear products ==
To ensure high quality and safety of footwear, manufacturers have to make sure all products comply to existing and relevant standards. By producing footwear in accordance with national and international regulations, potential risks can be minimized and the interest of both textile manufacturers and consumers can be protected. The following standards/regulations apply to footwear products:

- CPSIA
- GB Standards such as
  - GB20400－2006 Leather and fur-limit of harmful matter
  - QB/T1002-2005 Leather shoes
  - GB/T 15107 Athletic footwear
- EN Standards for Footwear
- ASTM Standards
- ISO standards
- AAFA Restricted Substance List
- BIS (ISI) : IS 15298-I: 2011 test methods, IS 15298 –II for safety footwear, IS 15298-III Protective footwear, IS 15298-IV Occupational Footwear

== Impressions ==
Footwear can create two types of impressions: two-dimensional and three-dimensional impressions. When footwear places material onto a solid surface, it creates a two-dimensional impression. These types of impressions can be made with a variety of substances, like dirt and sand. When footwear removes material from a soft surface, it creates a three-dimensional impression. These types of impressions can be made in a variety of soft substances, like snow and dirt. Two-dimensional impressions also differ from three-dimensional impressions because the latter demonstrate length, width, and depth whereas two-dimensional impressions only demonstrate the first two aspects.

== See also ==
- American Apparel and Footwear Association – American trade association
- American Podiatric Medical Association – US professional medical organization
- Boot fetishism – Sexual fetish
- Hiking boot – Sturdy footwear for outdoor activities
- List of footwear designers
- List of shoe styles
- Orthopaedic footwear – Shoes designed to alleviate discomfort
- Shoe fetishism – Erotic attraction to shoes
- Shoe size – Measurement scale for footwear
- Shoes – Footwear
