= Pointed shoe =

Pointed or pointy shoe or shoes may refer to:

- Beaked shoe, a winter boot with upturned toe for attaching skis
- Beatle boots, a variant of Chelsea boots worn in Britain and elsewhere from the 1950s to present
- Calcei repandi, pointed shoes fashionable in ancient Etruscan culture; see Daily life of the Etruscans § Shoes
- Ciocie, worn by Italian peasants since the medieval period
- Climbing shoes, which now typically include a reinforced extension for better toeholds
- Jutti with a nokh, or pointy tip
- Opanci, worn by Balkan peasants since antiquity
- Mexican pointy boots, worn in Mexico and the southern United States since the 21st century
- Pigache, worn in 11th–13th century Europe
- Poulaines, worn in 14th and 15th century Europe
- Winklepickers, worn in Britain and elsewhere from the 1960s to present

== See also ==
- Pointe shoe, worn by ballet dancers
- Sabatons, armored footwear which has often been pointed
