= Pigache =

11th and 12th century European shoe with long upturned toe

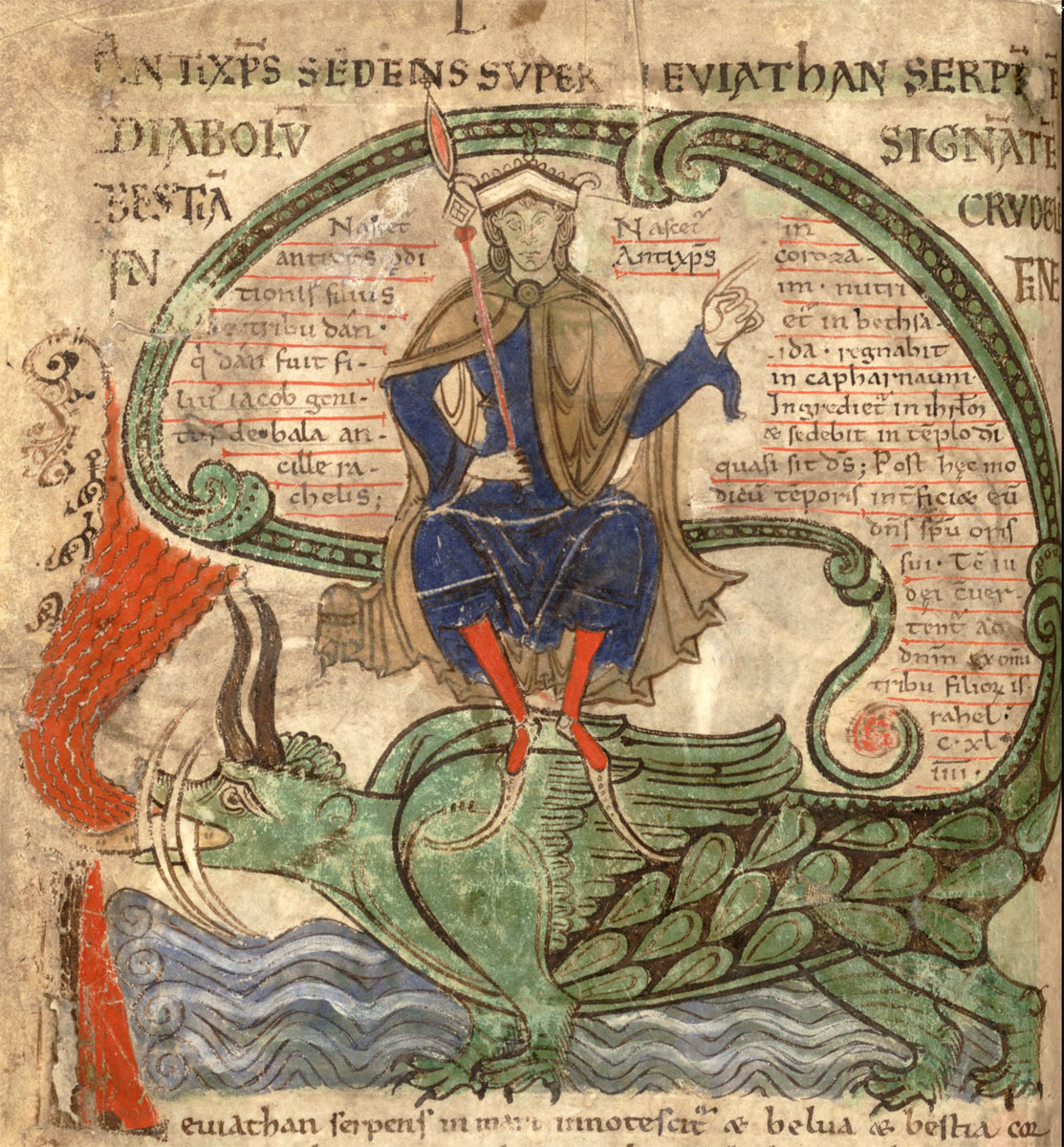
The Antichrist, depicted in a 1120 copy of Lambert's Liber Floridus with pigaches or their pattens extended into absurdly long horns, a style later actually worn as the 14th-century poulaines

The pigache, also known by other names, was a kind of shoe with a sharp upturned point at the toes that became popular in Western Europe during the Romanesque Period. The same name is also sometimes applied to earlier similar Byzantine footwear.

== Names ==
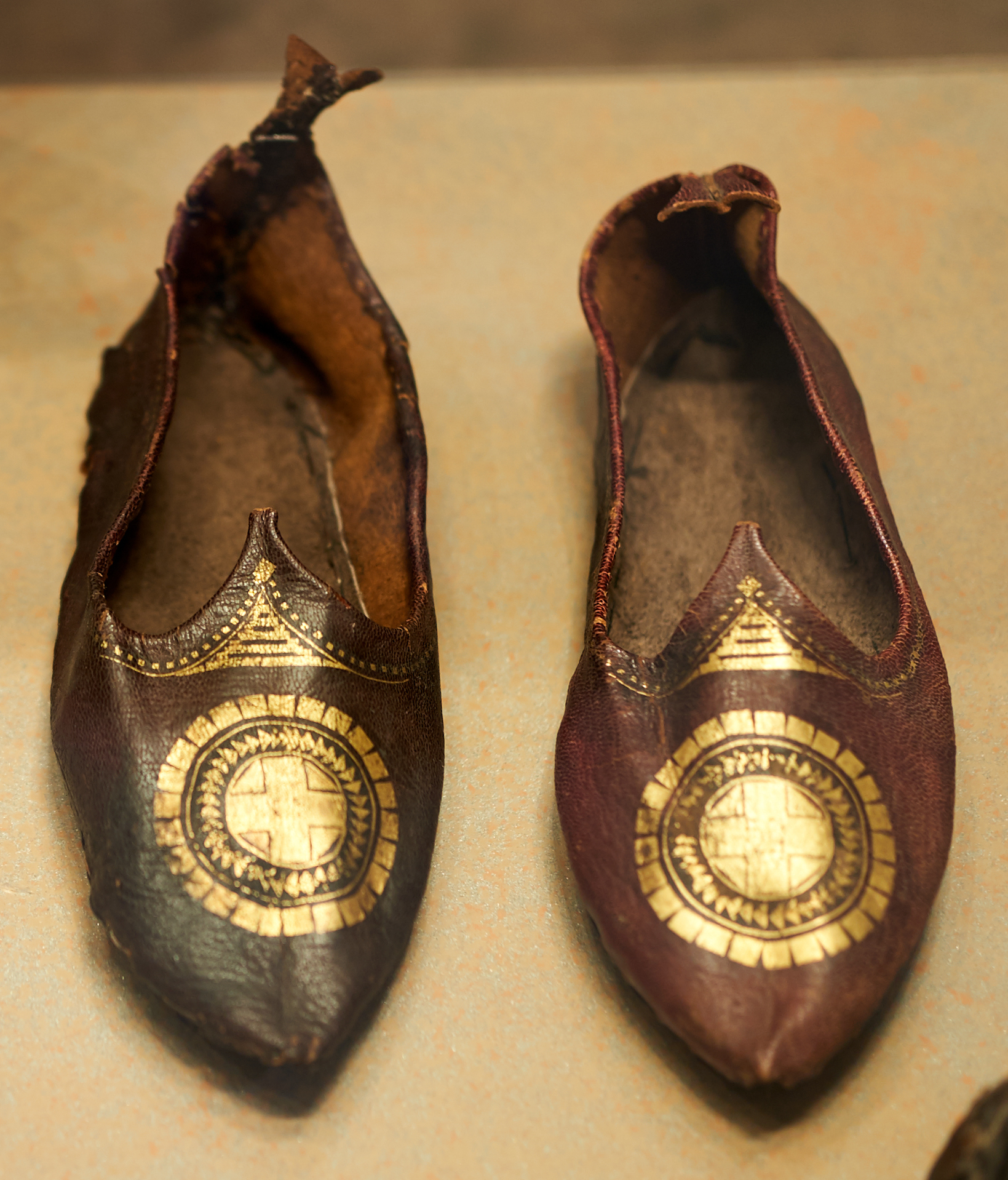
Priestly Byzantine Egyptian footwear (5th–8th cent.), sometimes conflated with the later pigaches

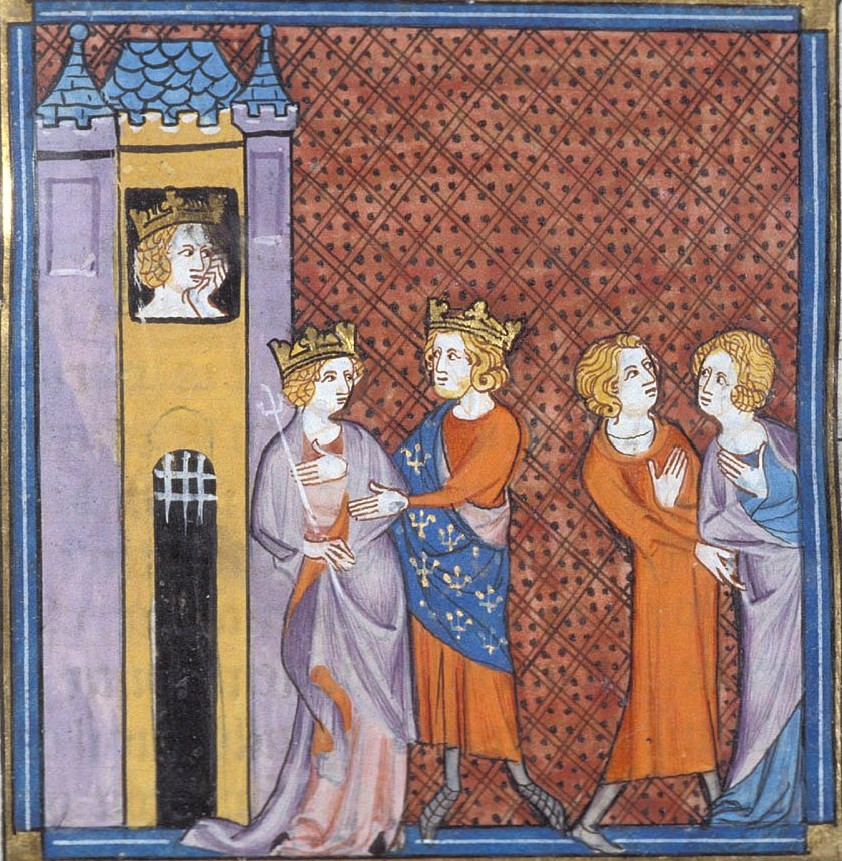
Fulk, King Philip, Bertha, and Bertrade, from the Chronicle of St Denis (14th cent.)

The English name pigache was borrowed from French, where the name was originally used for a kind of hoe and as a hunting term for a wild boar hoofprint longer on one side than the other. It appeared in Medieval Latin as pigacia and pigatia. The pigache is also known as the pigage, pulley shoe, pulley toe, or pulley-toe shoe. Less often, Orderic Vitalis's terms of opprobrium are reworked into names: scorpion's tail or ram's horn shoe. The name pigache is also sometimes also applied to earlier pointed Byzantine footwear from as early as the 5th century. It is also simply glossed as a pointed-toe shoe and sometimes conflated with the later poulaine.

== Design ==
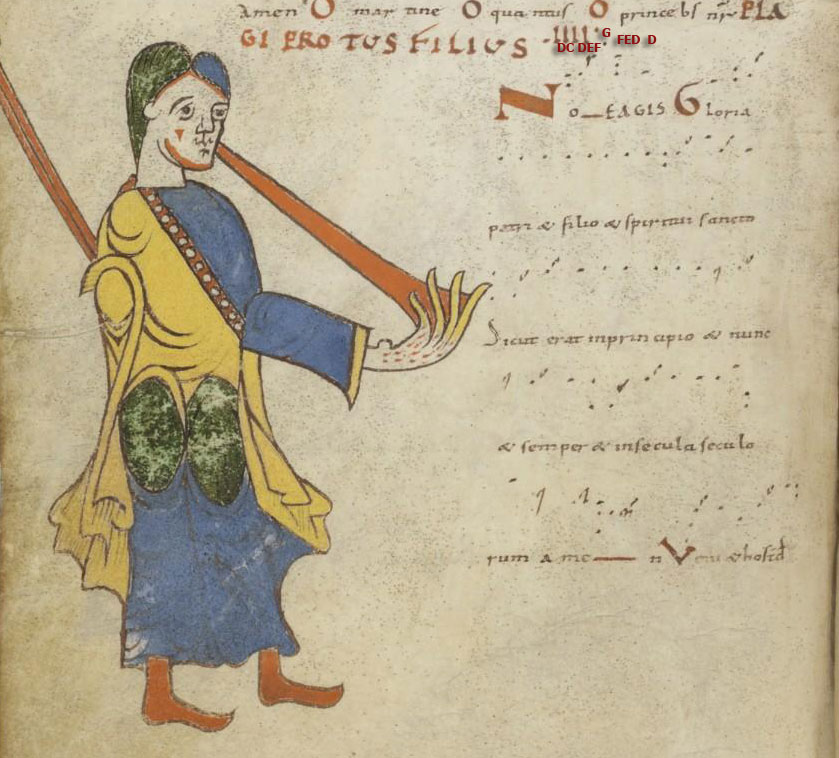
Pigaches in an 11th cent. illumination from an Aquitaine tonary

The pigache had a pointed and curved toe, which Orderic Vitalis compared with the tail of a scorpion (quasi caudas scorpionum). The shoes were sometimes stuffed to make the extension firmer and more erect. The end of the toe was sometimes adorned with a small bell. The points of pigaches were, however, more moderate in length than the later poulaines which spread from Poland in the 14th century.

== History ==
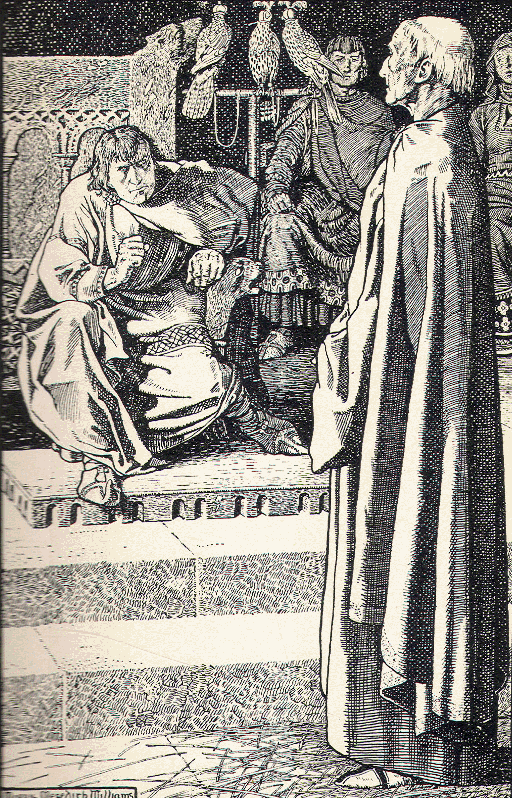
William Rufus in pigaches in a 1915 illustration of the life of St Anselm

The pigache was worn in the late 11th and early 12th century and excited the ridicule of poets and historians and the censure of clergy to the point it is sometimes described as "notorious". St Anselm banned its use by English clerics at the 1102 Synod of Westminster, alongside enacting the Gregorian Reform and prohibiting slavery, sodomy, clerical marriage, and the inheritance of benefices and other forms of simony. As a returning papal legate, the former professor Robert de Courson banned other faculty of the University of Paris from wearing them in August 1215. The same year, the Fourth Lateran Council also banned them for Catholic clergy. Orderic Vitalis blamed the creation of the pigache on Fulk of Anjou (1043–1109), claiming he used it to disguise the deformity of his bunions from his young bride Bertrade in 1089. The fashion historian Ruth Wilcox offers that it may have been a simple adaptation of the Normans' sabatons, which they had extended to a point and turned down in the late 11th century to better hold their stirrups during battle.

The pigache became common in England under William Rufus (r. 1087–1100), whose courtier Robert the Horny (Robertus Cornardus) used tow to curl the ends of his shoes into the form of a ram's horn (instar cornu arietis). Orderic blamed the spread as caused by and contributing to the effeminate men (effeminati) and "foul catamites" (foedi catamitae) involved in the royal courts of Europe, while simultaneously describing how most courtiers adopted the fashion to "seek the favors of women with every kind of lewdness". William of Malmesbury similarly condemned the shoes in terms questioning the wearers' masculinity. Guibert of Nogent, while no less dismissive, associated the style more with women and blamed its origin on footwear exported from Islamic Cordoba, whose residents he separately associated with effeminacy and homosexual rape.

After its initial excesses reaching about 2 inches (5 cm) beyond the foot, the style settled into a more conservative and compact form for a century until the Black Death and the spread of the still more excessive poulaine style from Poland in the mid-14th century.

== See also ==
- List of shoe styles
- Duckbill shoe
- Pointed shoes
- 1100–1200 in European fashion
- 1200–1300 in European fashion
