= Turnshoe =

Type of medieval leather shoe

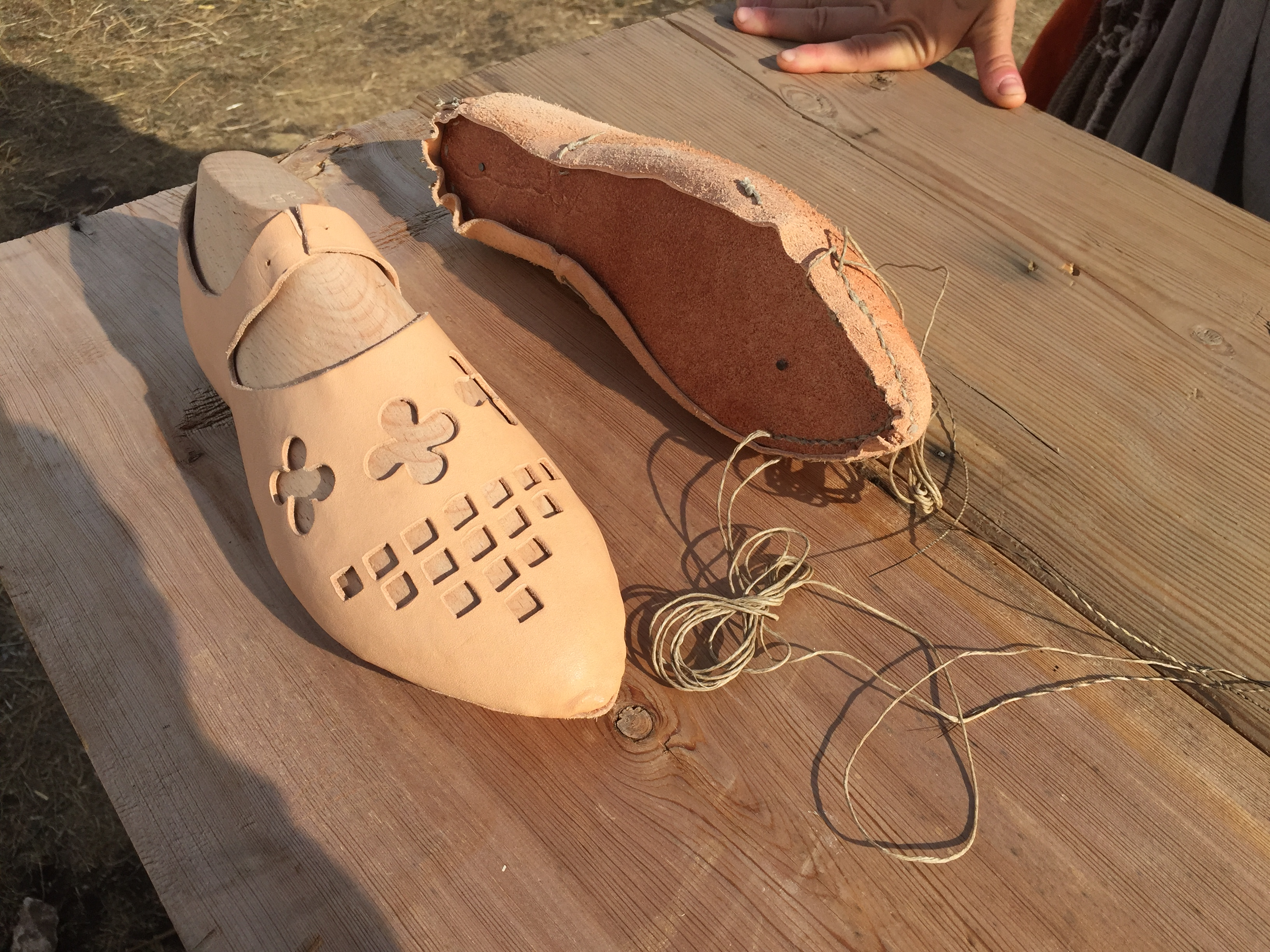
A modern reproduction of a medieval turnshoe; right, being sewn on a shoe last, inside out, and left, rightside-out, on another last

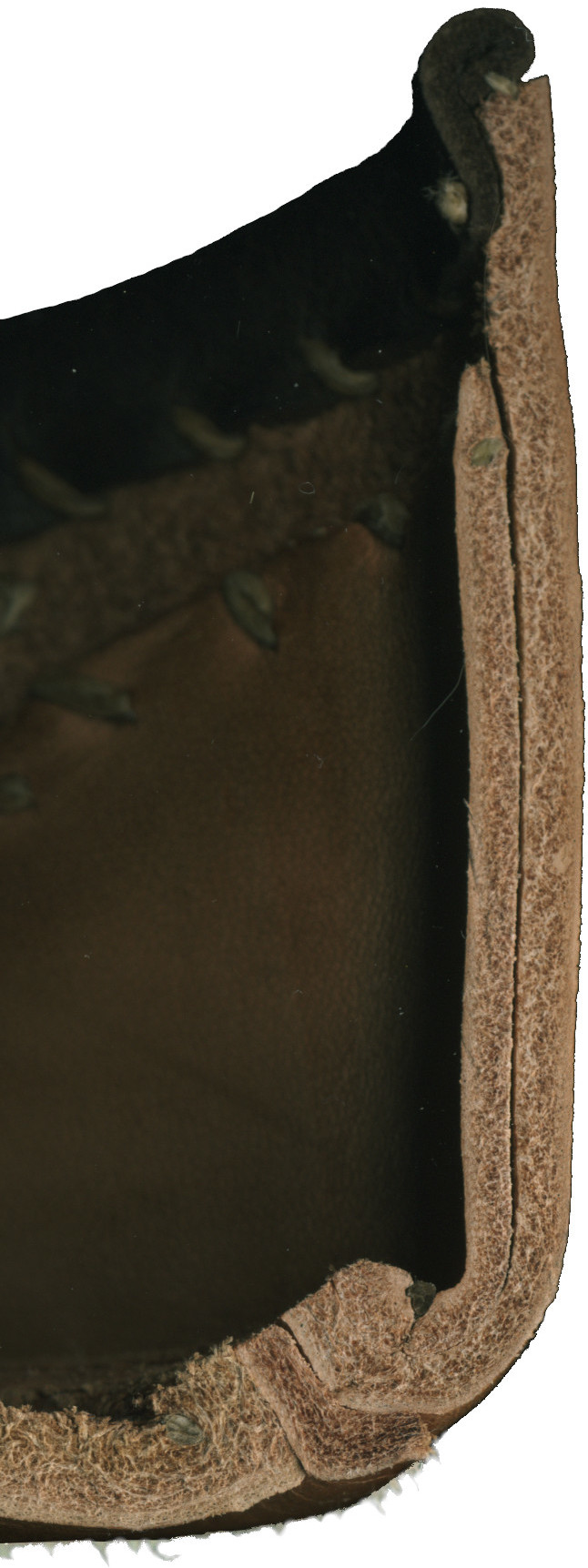
Cross-section through the heel of a reproduction turnshoe

A turnshoe is a type of leather shoe that was used during the Middle Ages. It was so named because it was put together inside out, and then was turned right-side-out once finished: this hides the main seam between the sole and vamp—prolonging the life of the shoe and inhibiting moisture leaking in through the seam.

In the beginning, turnshoes consisted of only one piece of leather sewn on only one side (see carbatinae). In the late early and the high medieval ages, turnshoes mostly consisted of one sole (cowhide or bovinae) and one piece of vamp or upper (goat or cowhide or caprinae/bovinae). In the late Middle Ages, additional elements were added, like doubled soles.

Later turnshoes often have more elaborate seams. The cross-section image shows how the seams are on the inside; the turnshoe shown has a topband (dark leather edge strip), a heel stiffener, and a rand (a thin strip sewn into the seam between the sole and the upper). Some turnshoes lack all of these. Turnshoes were eventually made with outsoles sewn onto the rands; then the shoes came to be sewn right-side-out, creating the welted shoe, which displaced turnshoes in the beginning of the 16th century. Since welted shoes did not have to be turned inside-out, they could be made of much thicker leather.

== Materials and manufacture ==
A shoemaker making turnshoes at the Roscheider Hof Open Air Museum (English subtitles)

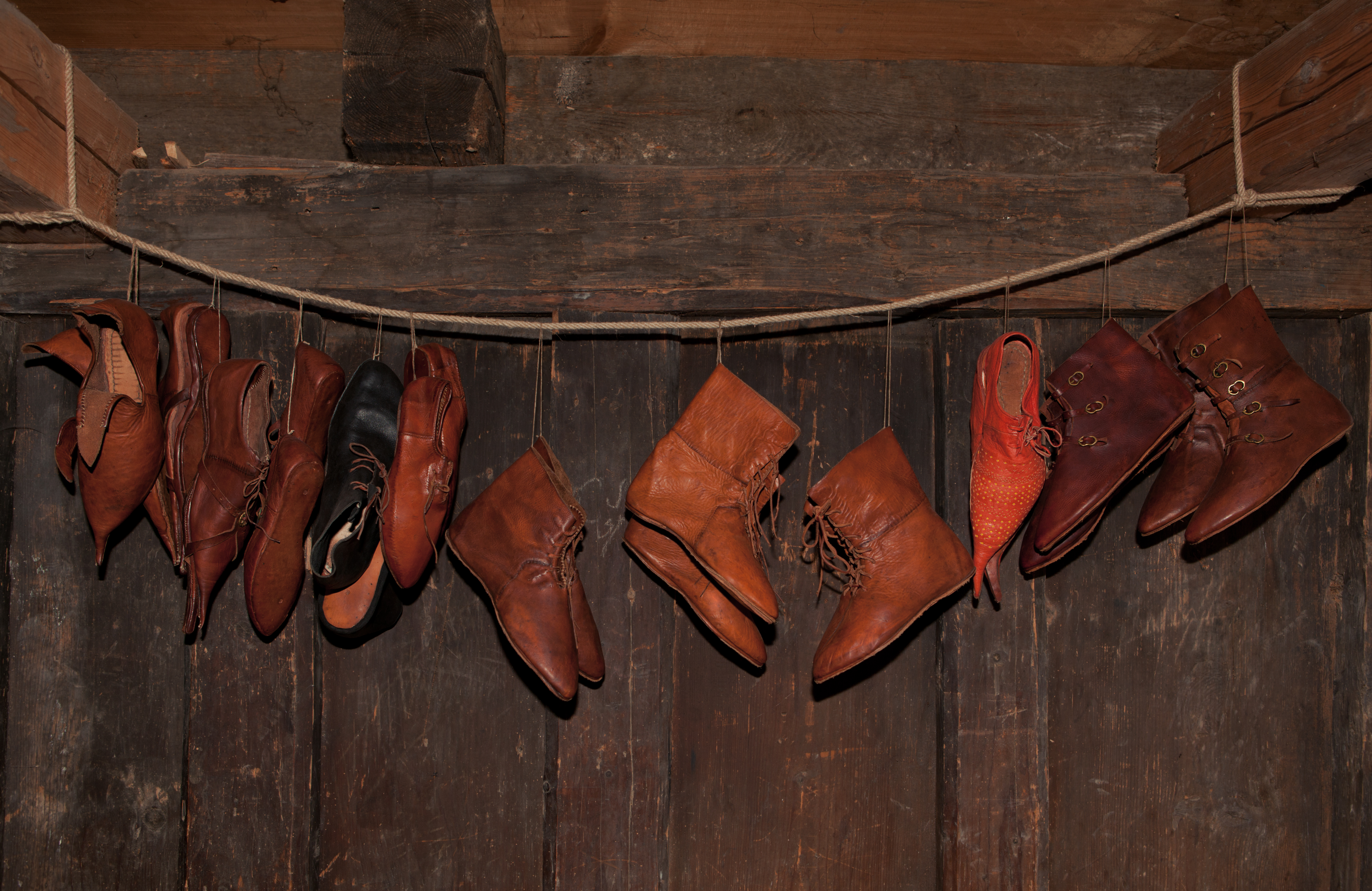
Reconstructions of turnshoes of the high and late Middle Ages, showing the characteristic thin, flexible sole (a stiff sole would prevent the shoe from being turned inside-out)

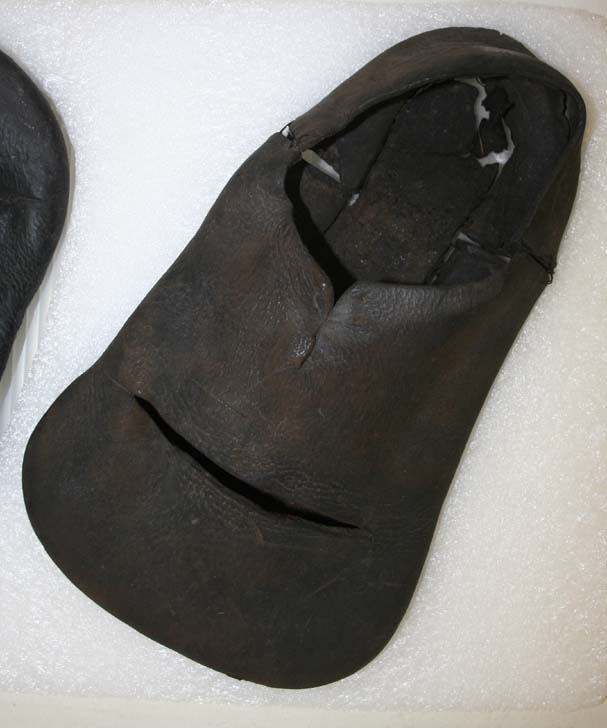
Original slip-on duckbilled turnshoe from the 1500s, Britain.

Turnshoes were generally made of cowhide. Sheepskin and goatskin were briefly popular in Scandinavia, and to a lesser extent in England in the 12th and 13th century. Soles were generally about 3-4mm thick, with the uppers made of thinner leather, about 2mm thick. Modern turnshoes are often made with thicker leather, 4–6mm on the soles; this makes them quite difficult to turn, but it is possible with vegetable-tanned leather (which softens when soaked in water). Shoes were sewn using waxed wool (which rots quickly), waxed linen thread (which rots more slowly and soon displaced wool), or a thong of leather or sinew. Modern turnshoes are usually made with waxed nylon, often in the form of synthetic sinew, which is harder-wearing but stronger than the leather, so that it may tend to pull through during stitching. After turning, the shoe was shaped while still soft (traditionally on a last). The dry leather was stuffed with waterproofing agents (like cooking oil, tallow, lard, or beeswax), which darkened it. The raw materials are fairly cheap; in the early-21st-century United Kingdom, no more than £10–15 for a pair.

Closings include various forms of lacing and rolled leather toggles, and vary by time period. Topbands (a method of edging at the ankle opening) are also common. More than half of Northern-European turnshoes were embroidered, with the embroidery recessed into the leather. Silk is the most common material for embroidery; linen was also used.

Turnshoes can be made with basic sewing skills but no shoemaking experience, though practice, and using a broken-in, well-worn turnshoe as a pattern, improves fit. Historically, they were often initially roughly-cut, and fine cutting and fitting were done over wooden lasts; modernly they are usually cut carefully to shape, then sewn without lasts. In the latter case, it is the pattern, instead of the last, which needs to match the shape of the foot. Turnshoes were most often made in the home.

== See also ==
- Shoe
- List of shoe styles
- Pattens, the protective overshoe used with turnshoes outdoors
- Poulaines, the pointed shoes in fashion during the 14th & 15th centuries
- Duckbill shoes, the wide shoes in fashion during the late 15th & early 16th century
- Bast shoe, used from prehistory to the 20th century
