= Poulaine =

Shoe with long pointed toe from Poland, popular in 15th century Europe

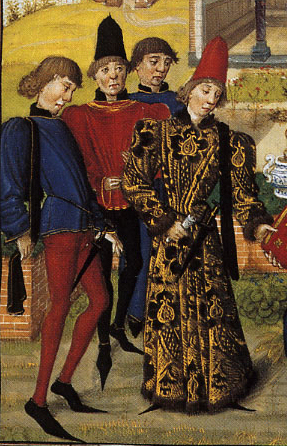
Poulaines worn in Burgundy c. 1470 near the end of their most fashionable period

Poulaines, also known by other names, were a style of unisex footwear with extremely long toes that were fashionable in Europe at various times in the Middle Ages. The poulaine proper was a shoe or boot of soft material whose elongated toe (also known as a poulaine or pike) frequently required filling to maintain its shape. The chief vogue for poulaines spread across Europe from medieval Poland in the mid-14th century and spread across Europe, reaching upper-class England with the 1382 marriage of Richard II to Anne of Bohemia and remaining popular through most of the 15th century. Sturdier forms were used as overshoes and the sabatons of the era's armor were often done in poulaine style.

Poulaines were periodically condemned by Christian writers of the time as demonic or vain. Kings of the era variously taxed them as luxuries, restricted their use to the nobility, or outright banned them.

Archaeological evidence indicates that poulaines were a medical liability. Digs at high-status cemeteries have shown that people likely to have worn the shoes quadrupled their risk of bunions and broken bones from falls.

After becoming more common as women's footwear and expanding to awkward lengths, poulaines fell from fashion in the 1480s (see duckbill shoe) and were seldom revived, although they are considered an influence on some later trends such as the 1950s British winklepicker boots.

== Names ==
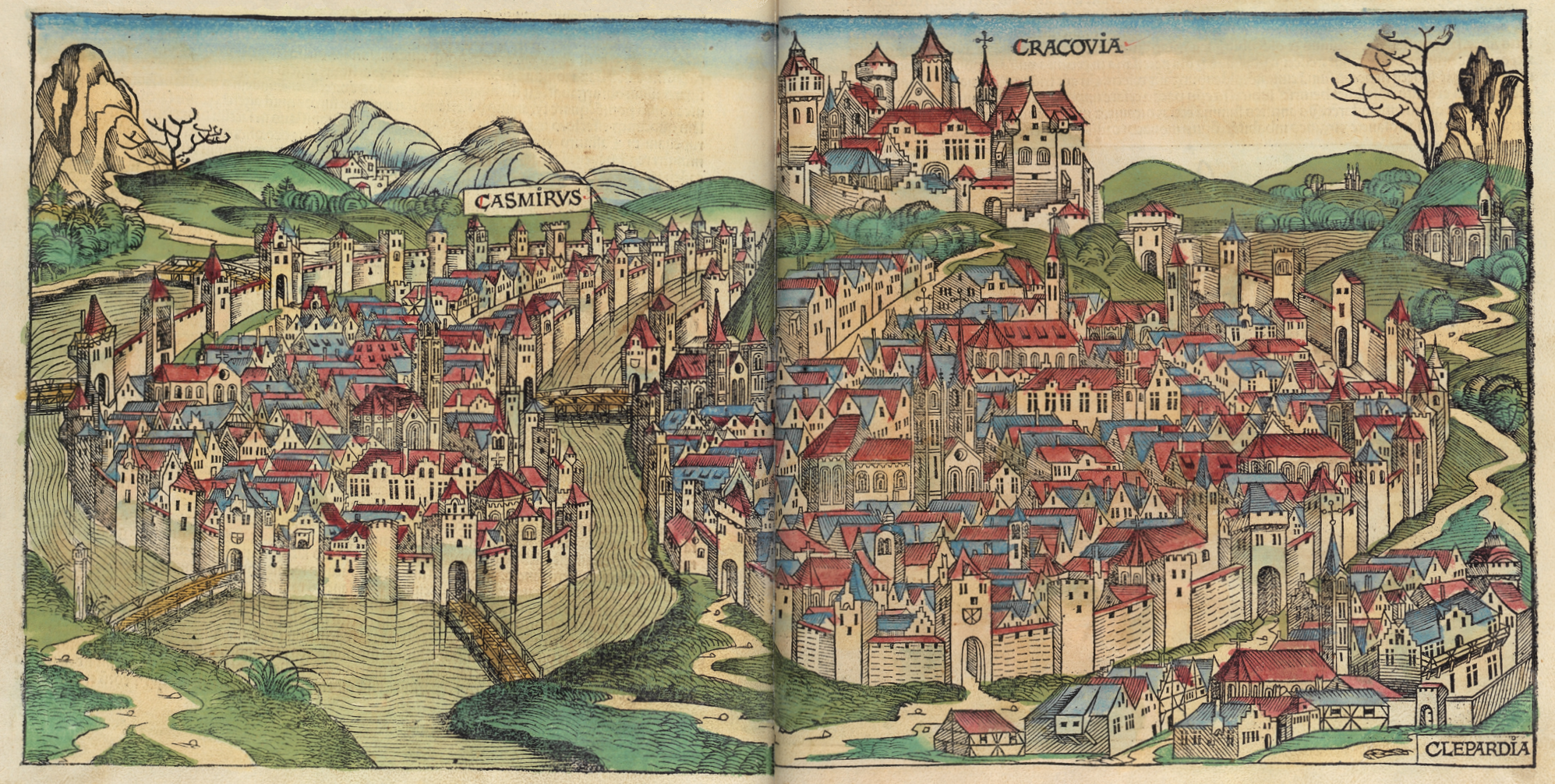
A woodcut of Kraków (Latin: Cracovia) in Poland from the 1493 Nuremberg Chronicle

The usual English name poulaine (/puˈleɪn/) is a borrowing and clipping of earlier Middle French soulers a la poulaine ("shoes in the Polish fashion") from the style's supposed origin in medieval Poland. They have also been known as pikes from the common weapon of the era; as piked, peaked, or copped shoes; as cracows, crakows, and krakows from the former Polish capital; or simply as pointed shoes, pointy shoes, or long toed shoes. Poulaine, pike, crakow, and liripipe can also be used particularly for the elongated toe itself, causing some writers to mistakenly restrict the usage of poulaine to only the toe and to insist on crakow as the name of the footwear itself. Despite appearing in a 2014 Vogue article, however, use of crakow for the shoe is now so uncommon as to be marked obsolete in the Oxford English Dictionary. The elongated toe was also known as a beak, although this was not generally applied to the shoe itself.

== History ==
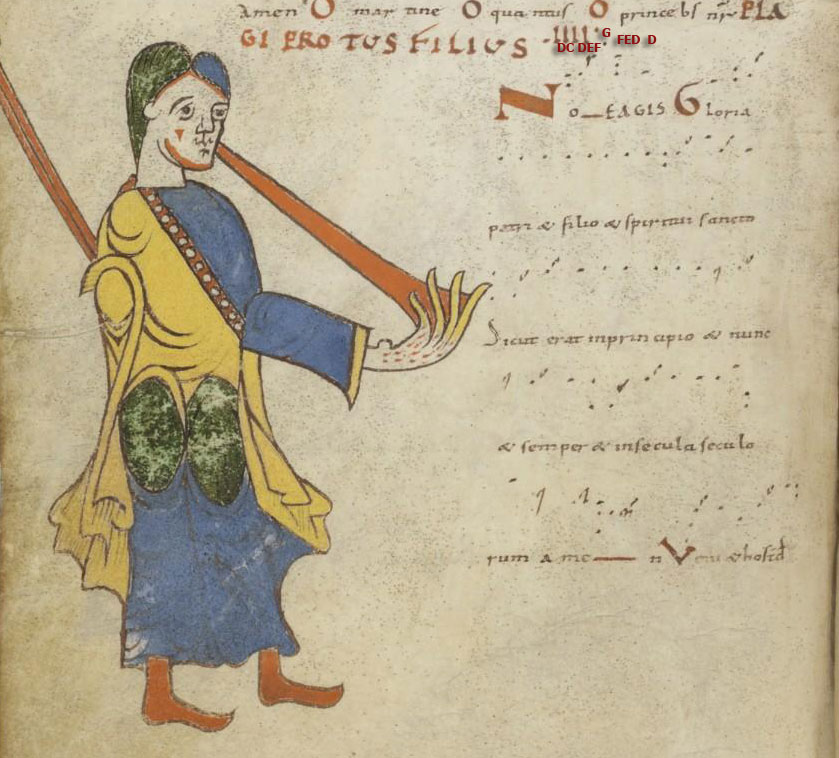
Pigaches in an 11th cent. illumination from an Aquitaine tonary

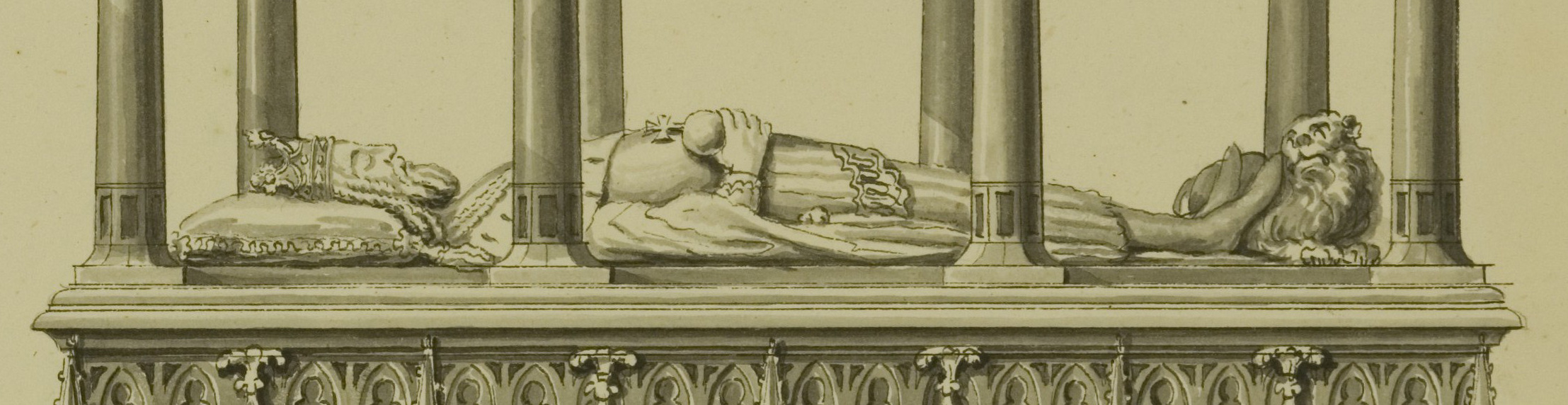
The tomb effigy of Casimir the Great of Poland (r. 1333–1370)

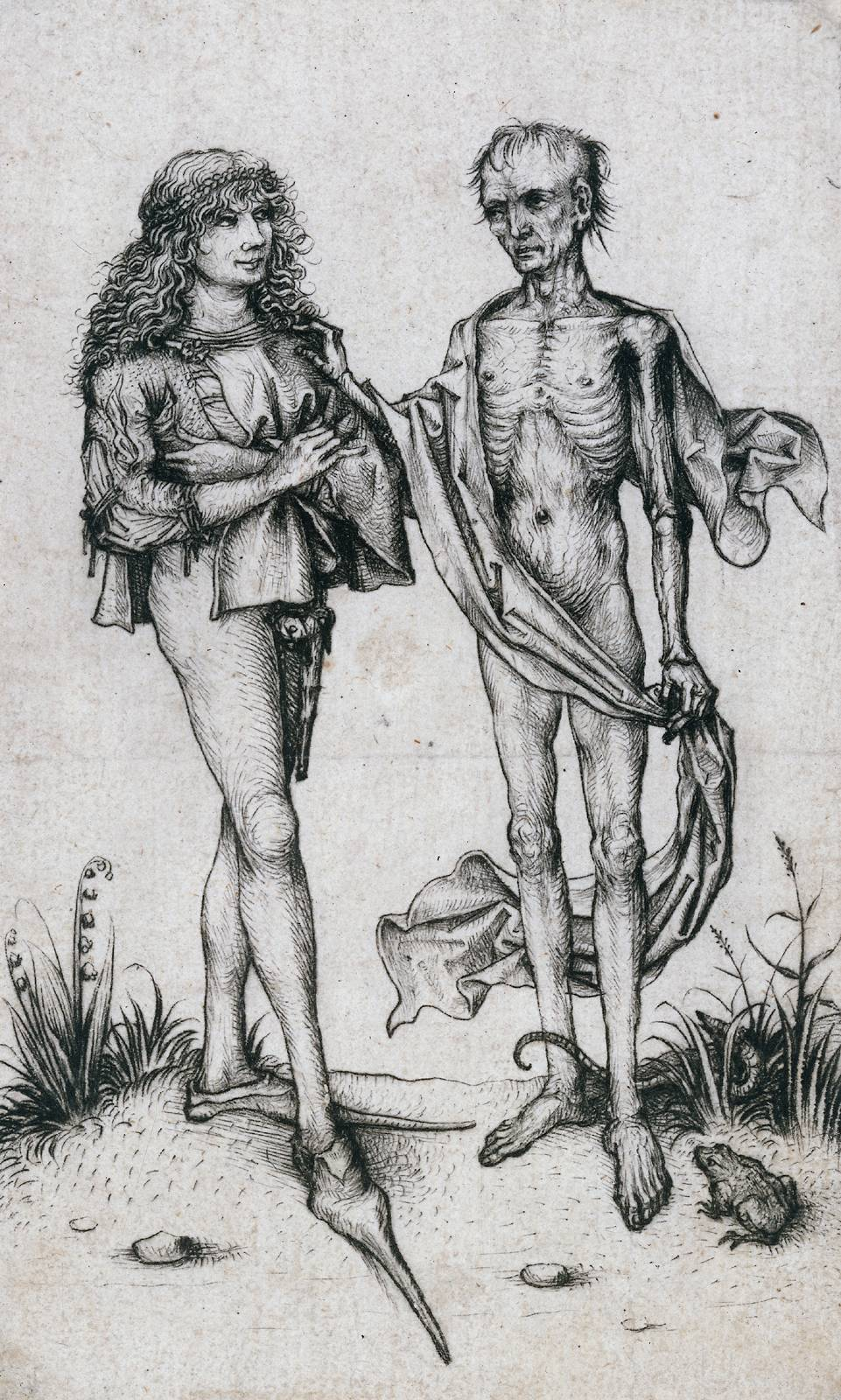
"Young Man Meets Death" by the Master of the Housebook c. 1485

Shoes with pointed, curled, and/or elongated toes are documented in the archeological record back to at least 3000 BC and have passed in and out of fashion over time. In classical antiquity, the Etruscan calceus repandus ("turned calceus") was worn by both genders before becoming particularly associated under the Romans with Juno Sospita and related goddesses. In Byzantine fashion, priestly vestments included gilt slippers ending in forward point from at least the 5th century.

Pointed-toed shoes first became a major trend in Western fashion with the late-11th-century pigache. They were ridiculed by poets and historians and censured by the clergy, who compared them to scorpion's tails and ram's horns and repeatedly connected them to effeminacy and homosexuality while simultaneously condemning how most courtiers adopted the fashion to "seek the favors of women with every kind of lewdness". As a returning papal legate, the former professor Robert de Courson banned other faculty of the University of Paris from wearing them in August 1215. The same year, the Fourth Lateran Council also banned embroidered and pointed-toe shoes for clergy. Guibert of Nogent blamed the origin of the pigache on footwear exported from Islamic Cordoba, Orderic Vitalis on the promiscuous Fulk of Anjou's attempts to disguise the deformity of his bunions. The fashion historian Ruth Wilcox offers that it may have been a simple adaptation of the Normans' own sabatons, which they had extended to a point and turned down in the late 11th century to better hold their stirrups during battle. After its initial excesses reaching about 2 inches (5 cm) beyond the foot and a trend of stuffing and styling the ends started by William Rufus's courtier Robert the "Horny" (Robertus Cornardus), the style settled into a more conservative and compact form for a century until the Black Death. It was still necessary, however, to restate the injunctions against clerical use of the shoes in 1281 and 1342.

Poulaines proper spread across Europe in the mid-14th century before falling out of fashion in the 1480s. It spread from the Polish court of Casimir the Great to France and thence to Burgundy, Germany, England, and Scotland.

The arrival—or resumption—of this fashion in England is traditionally associated with the marriage of Richard II and Anne of Bohemia, daughter of the emperor Charles IV, in 1382. In his entry for the year 1394, the Evesham monk who wrote the History of the Life and Reign of Richard II claimed that "with this Queen there came from Bohemia into England those accursed vices, namely shoes with a long beak—the English cracows or pikes—taking up 0.5 yards (46 cm) in length so that it is necessary to tie them to the shin with silver chains before they can be used to walk forward". (Note: In Latin: Cum ista Regina venit de Boëmia in Angliam abusiones illae execrabiles, sotulares sil. cum longis rostris (Anglice Cracowys vel Pykys) dimidiam virgam largiter habentes, ita ut oporteret eos ad tibiam ligari cum cathenis argenteis, antequam cum eis possent incedere.) In fact, the style had reached England before Anne's birth. In his entry for the year 1362, the Malmesbury monk who wrote the Eulogium Historiarum states that "Moreover they have beaked shoes a finger in length that they call cracows. They are better called demons' claws than decorations for men." (Note: In Latin: Habient etiam sotulares rostratas in unius digiti longitudine quae crakowes vocantur. Potius judicantur ungular... daemonum quam ornamenta hominum.) Similarly, John of Reading complained in the 1360s of Englishmen's "shoes... with sideways beaks". (Note: In Latin: sotularibus... lateraliter rostratis...) It seems more likely, instead, that Anne's entourage further popularized the style or simply that the monastic author at Evesham was using the fiction for political ends.

The 14th-century poulaines so far recovered in London have only been found only in men's sizes, although depictions of Lora St. Quintin—wife of John de Grey's son Robert de Marmion—show her wearing shorter poulaines with their points curved to the sides. By the 15th century, art shows frequent use by both men and women, with the toes of men's shoes being the most extravagantly long.

They were a controversial fashion and faced criticism from several quarters. In 1368, Charles V of France issued an edict banning their construction and use in Paris. An English poem from 1388 complained that men were unable to kneel in prayer because their toes were too long. The c. 1440 morality play Castle of Perseverance includes the footwear in the "advice" that Humanum Genus ("Mankind") gets from Superbia ("Pride"): "Look that thou blow mickle boasts with long crakows on thy shoes". (Note: In Middle English: Loke þou blowe mekyl bost Wyth longe crakows on þi schos)

In 1463, Edward IV passed a sumptuary law that "no knight under the state of a lord, esquire, gentleman, nor other person shall use nor wear after the... feast of Saint Peter any shoes or boots having pikes passing the length of two inches" (5 cm). In 1465, they were banned in England altogether, so that all cordwainers and cobblers within the City of London and environs were prohibited from making shoes with pikes more than 2 inches long.

By the 1480s, poulaines had generally fallen from fashion in favor of the wide duckbill shoes supposedly popularized by Charles VIII of France owing to his own six-toed foot. The poulaine inspired later footwear fashions, such as the 1950s winklepicker boots.

== Design ==
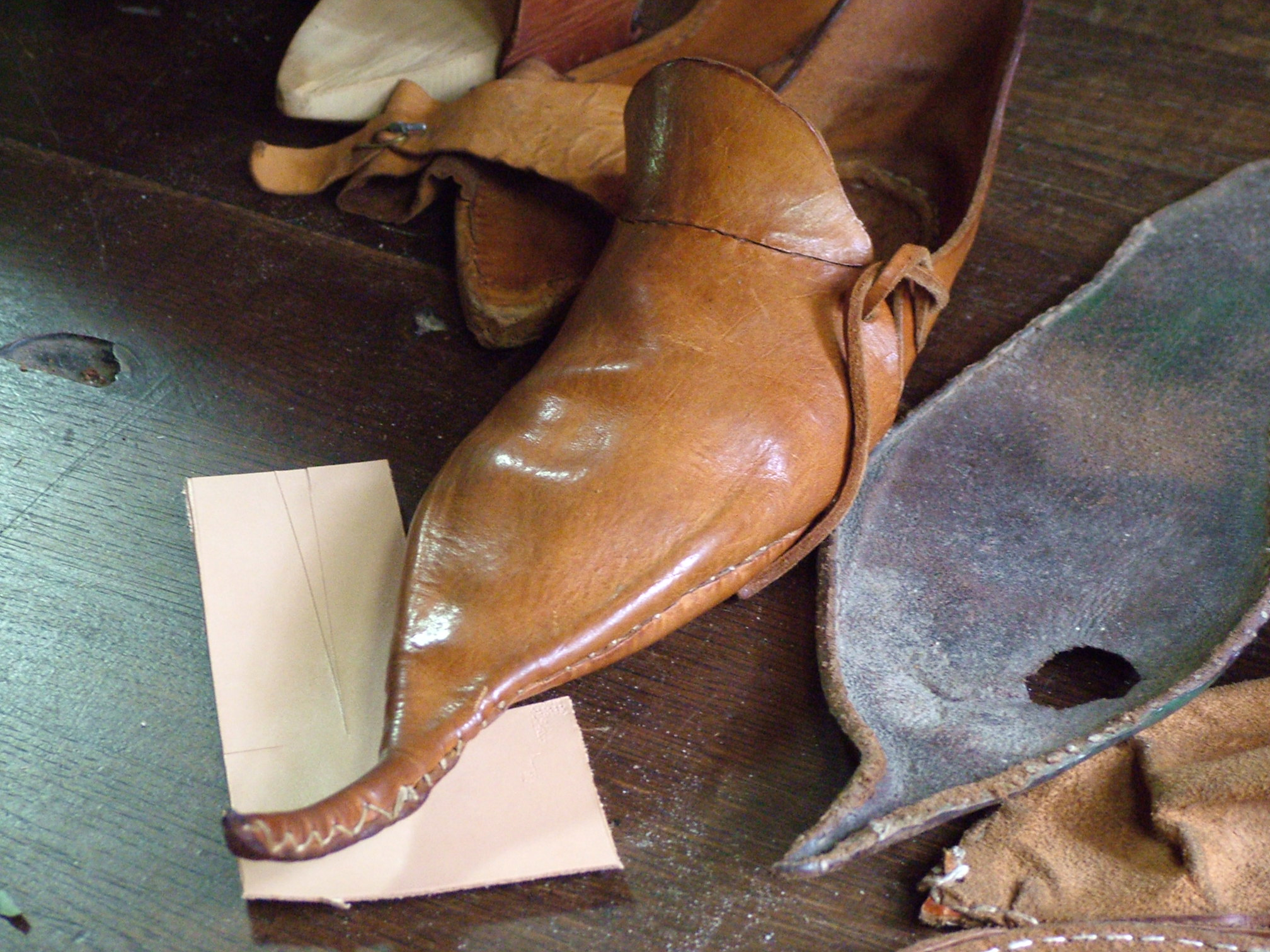
A poulaine for sale in Archeon, Netherlands, in 2008

=== Toe length ===
Archaeological evidence in the form of surviving shoe soles shows that the length of the point beyond the toes of the foot was rarely, if ever, more than 50% of the length of the foot. This is consistent with depictions of highly fashionable European men from the third quarter of the 15th century when poulaines were at the height of their popularity. As with many items of high fashion, the most extreme examples were worn by the upper classes.

=== Stuffing ===
Poulaine toes were packed with stuffing to provide rigidity and help them hold their shape. Surviving examples from medieval London have the points stuffed with moss. An Italian chronicler noted in 1388 that they were also sometimes stuffed with horsehair.

=== Tying up the toes ===
Although there is no archaeological or medieval iconographic evidence to support the idea that the toes were ever tied up to the leg, as noted earlier, there is direct literary evidence dating from 1394 which states that this was the practice at the time these shoes were introduced into England. Additionally, the practice is mentioned by the antiquarian John Stow in his 1698 publication A Survey of London, where he wrote:

In Distar Lane, on the north side thereof, is the Cordwainer's Hall, which company were made a brotherhood or fraternity in the eleventh of Henry IV. Of these cordwainers, I read, that since the fifth of Richard II (when he took to wife Anne, daughter to Wenceslaus [sic], King of Bohemia), by her example the English people had used piked shoes, tied to their knees with silken laces, or chains of silver or gilt, wherefore in the fourth of Edward IV it was ordained and proclaimed that beaks of shoon and boots should not pass the length of two inches, upon pain of cursing by the clergy, and by Parliament to pay twenty shillings for every pair. And every cordwainer that shod any man or woman on the Sunday, to pay thirty shillings.

However, given that John Stow was writing over 100 years after the shoes fell out of fashion, and the lack of rigorous historical research in the writings of the time, he cannot be considered a reliable source. His record of Act 4 of Edward IV is exaggerated—the actual act does mention restrictions in length, but not monetary penalties, parliament or clergy:

Nulle persone Cordewaner ou Cobeler .. face.. ascuns soler galoges ou husend oveqe ascun pike ou poleine qe passera la longuer ou mesure de deux poutz.

== Health effects ==
A 2005 study of early and late medieval remains found bunions exclusively in corpses from the poulaine era. A 2021 study of 177 corpses from four cemeteries around Cambridge, England, affirmed this, finding that those who lived in more fashionable neighborhoods during the height of the poulaine fashion were far more likely to have bunions, misshapen feet, and FOOSH (fall on outstretched hand) bone fractures associated with injury from falling. One of the coauthors, Piers Mitchell, noted "People really did wear ridiculously long, pointy shoes, just like they did in Blackadder". Of the remains that could be dated, 27% from the 14th and 15th centuries had bunions pronounced enough to cause skeletal deformation versus only 6% prevalence during the 11th, 12th, and 13th centuries. Emma McConnachie of the College of Podiatry noted that the findings "highlight these have been around for quite some time" and "the fashion choices of the 14th century inflicted similar issues from footwear as we see presenting in clinics today."

== Related footwear ==
=== Pattens ===
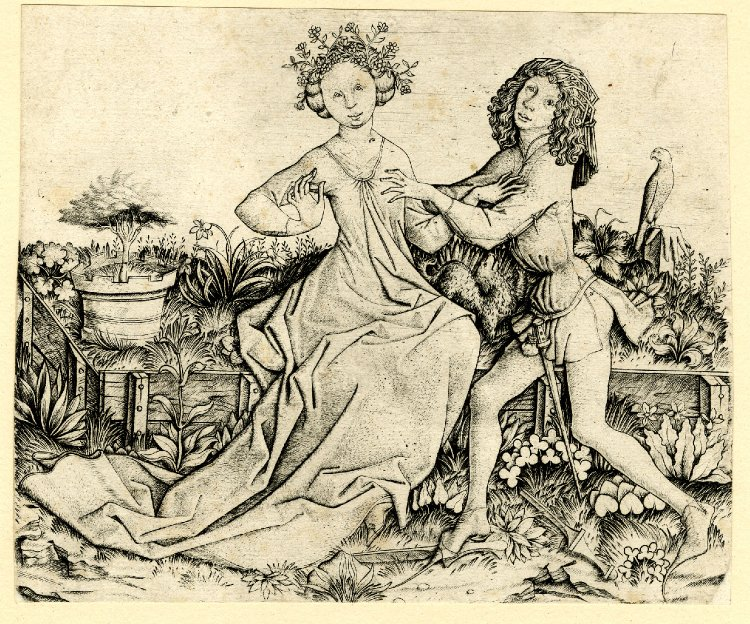
"Lovers on a Grassy" or "Garden Bank", a 1460s engraving by Master E. S. The man has discarded his very long pattens and begun removing his poulaines; the woman still wears hers.

Pattens were protective overshoes frequently worn in the late medieval and early modern period to protect footwear from mud and filth while outdoors. They were typically made from wood and fitted to the shoe with leather straps. The name poulaine was sometimes used for the elongated pattens necessary to protect the full length of the long-toed shoes of the period.

=== Sabatons ===
Sabatons were the protective footwear used with medieval European armor. During the period that poulaines were in fashion, the sabatons sometimes became similarly awkwardly long or pointed and interfered with soldiers' ability to walk or run. At the 1386 Battle of Sempach, it became necessary for the knights of Leopold III, Duke of Austria, to quickly dismount and fight on foot. Because they had not prepared for this, many were obliged to cut off the tips of their sabatons on the field to continue. Swiss chroniclers report a huge pile of these shoetips were found in a heap after the battle and this was illustrated in the account of the battle in the 1513 Luzerner Schilling. A surviving pair of sabatons belonging to Maximilian I, Holy Roman Emperor, have extremely long ends for use on horseback but these are detachable if fighting on foot became necessary. The catches can be seen over the area of the big toe.

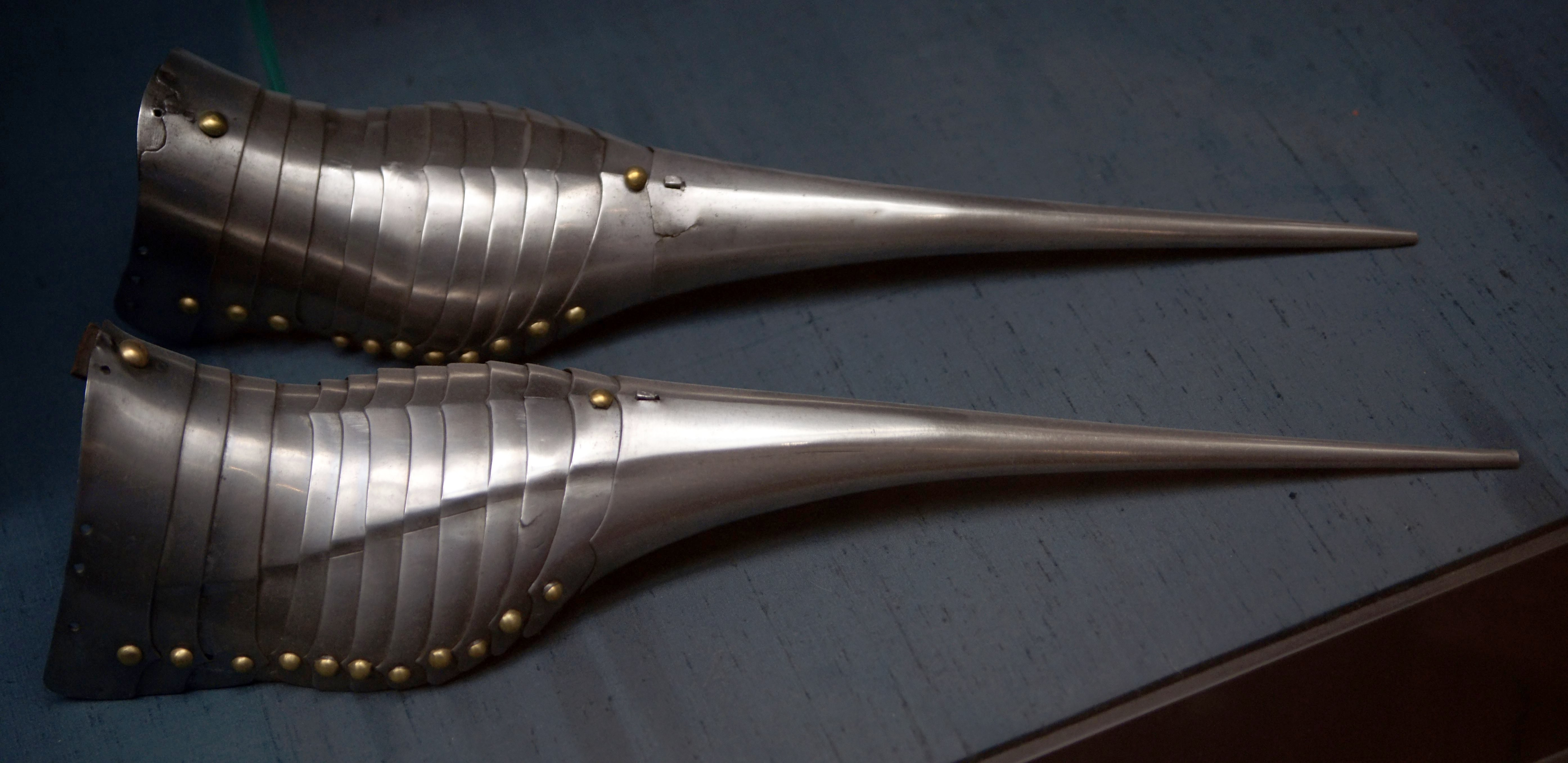
Sabatons of Maximilian I, Holy Roman Emperor, c. 1485

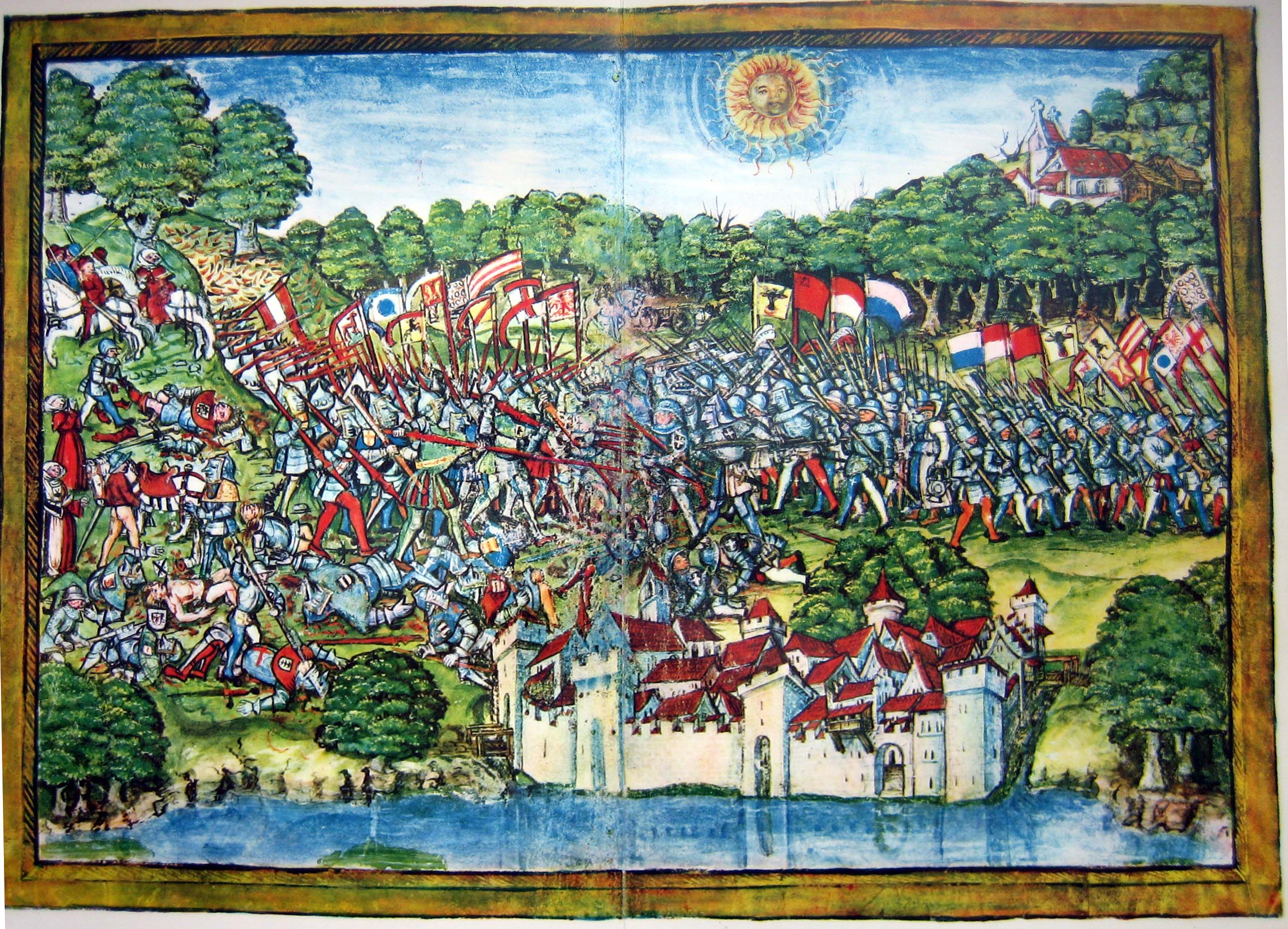
Depiction of the 1386 Battle of Sempach in the Luzerner Schilling

== See also ==
- List of shoe styles
- Pointed shoe (disambiguation)
- 1300–1400 in European fashion
- 1400–1500 in European fashion
