= Beaked shoe =

Type of footwear

Beaked shoes
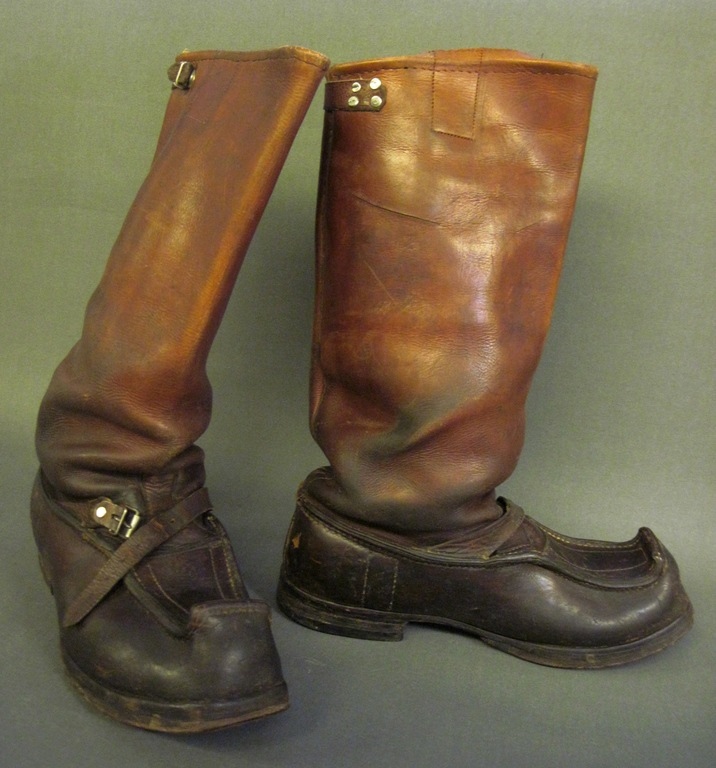
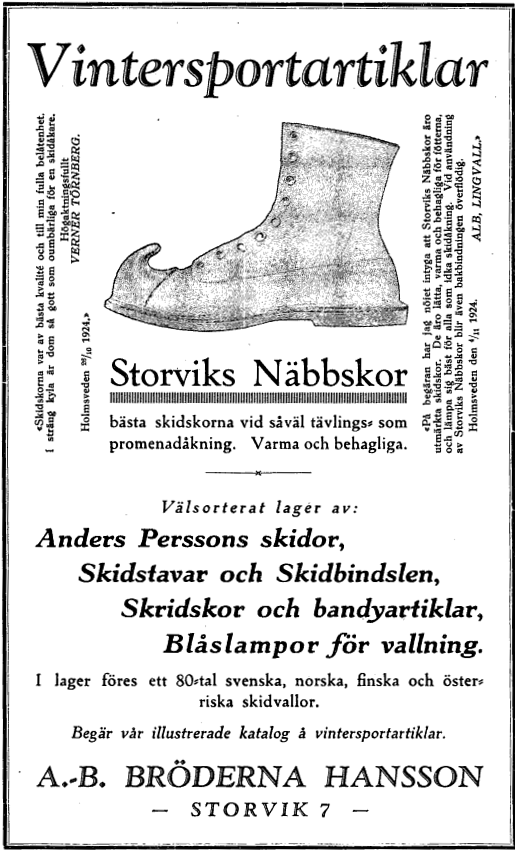
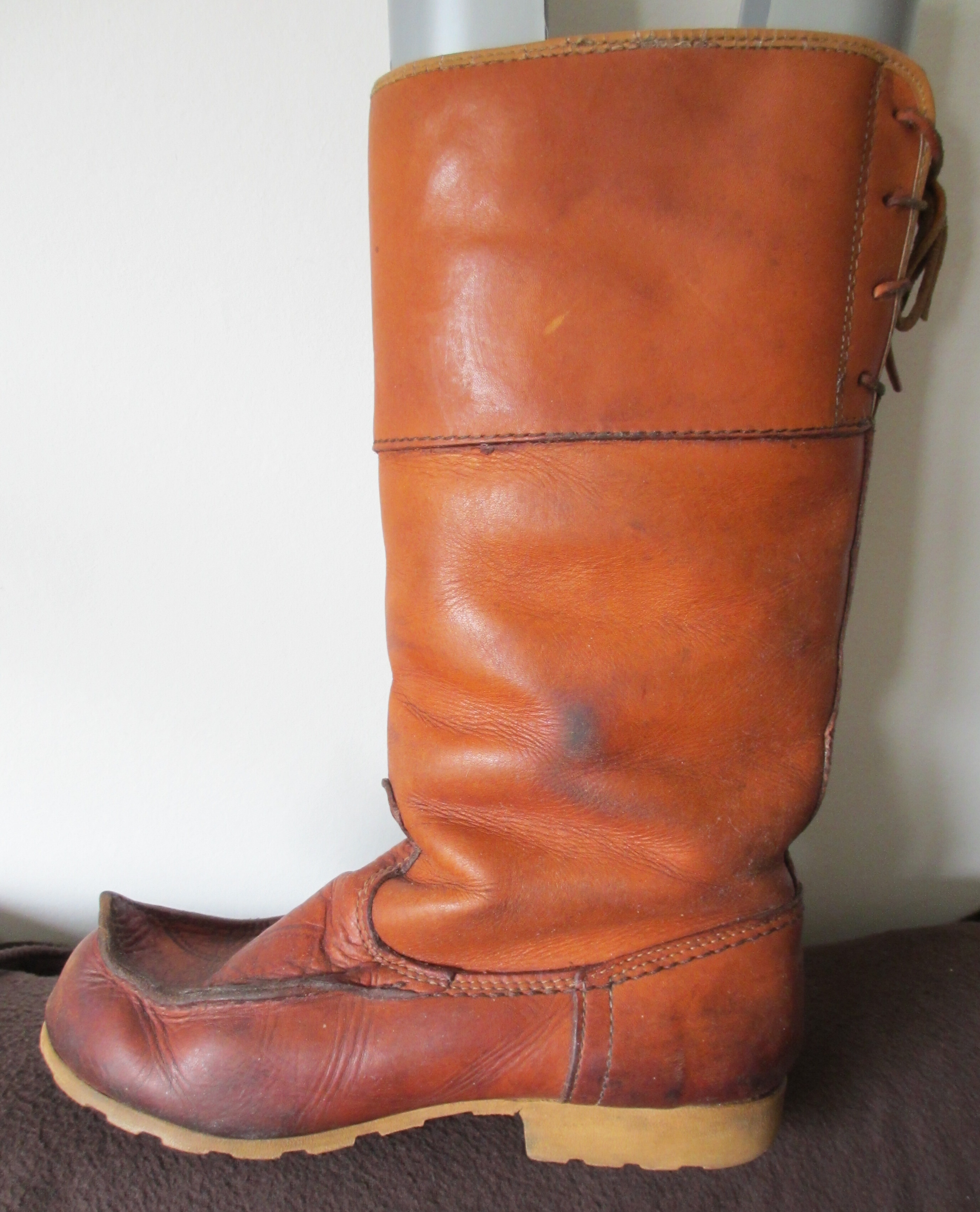
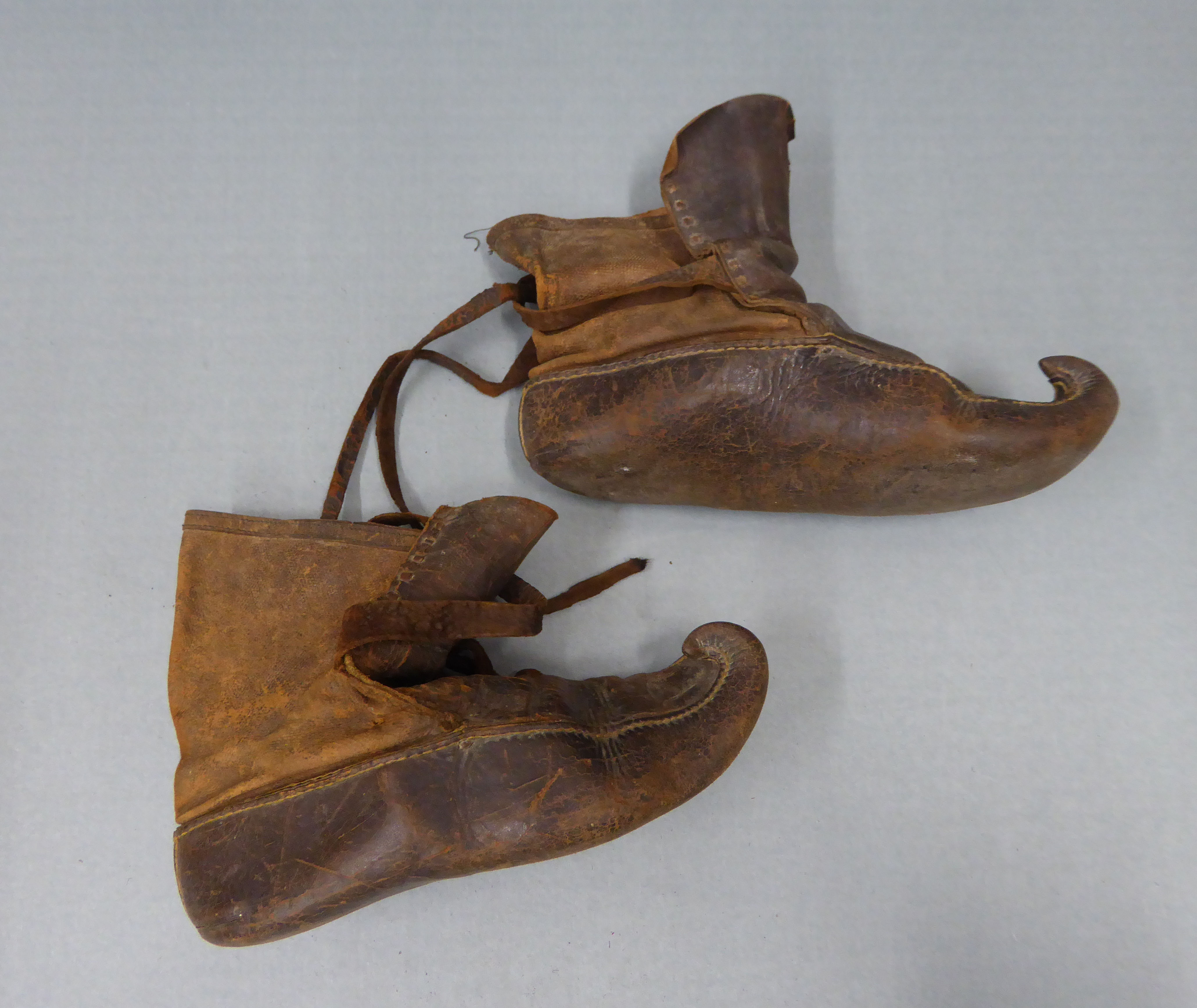
- Upper left: Beaked boots with strong hook for skis
- Upper right: Swedish ad for beaked shoes (1929)
- Lower left: Modern beaked boot with rubber sole
- Lower right: Older beaked shoes with leather sole

Beaked shoes or beaked boots (cf. Swedish: näbbsko, näbbstövel, lit. 'beak shoe, beak boot') (Note: Also descriptively called: curly toed boots, curved boots, pointy boots, among many others.) are a type of winter boot featuring pointy, upturned toes, called beaked toes or hooked toes, traditionally intended to aid the attachment of skis and snowshoes. Such are commonly made of reindeer leather, and may have shafts of various lengths.

In historical shoe terminology, "beak" may simply refer to any pointy elongated toe in general, such as that of the poulaine.

== History ==
Beakad shoes are ancient and has a strong connection to the Fennoscandian cultures, especially with the Sámi people, and Tornedalians, where it has become part of the folk costume (Northern Sami: nuvttagat, Lule Sami: nuvtaga, Southern Sami: novteagajat).

At the 1924 Winter Olympics, the Swedish skiers used beaked boots of felt, with thin soles, instead of thick leather such, along with short skis with loose leather bindings and no toe-iron. The Norwegian skiers rode on short skis with a new type of binding that held the foot in place and allowed turns, thus winning with ease.

Beaked boots had a fashion trend in Sweden during the 1970s, especially among the political left.

== Gallery ==
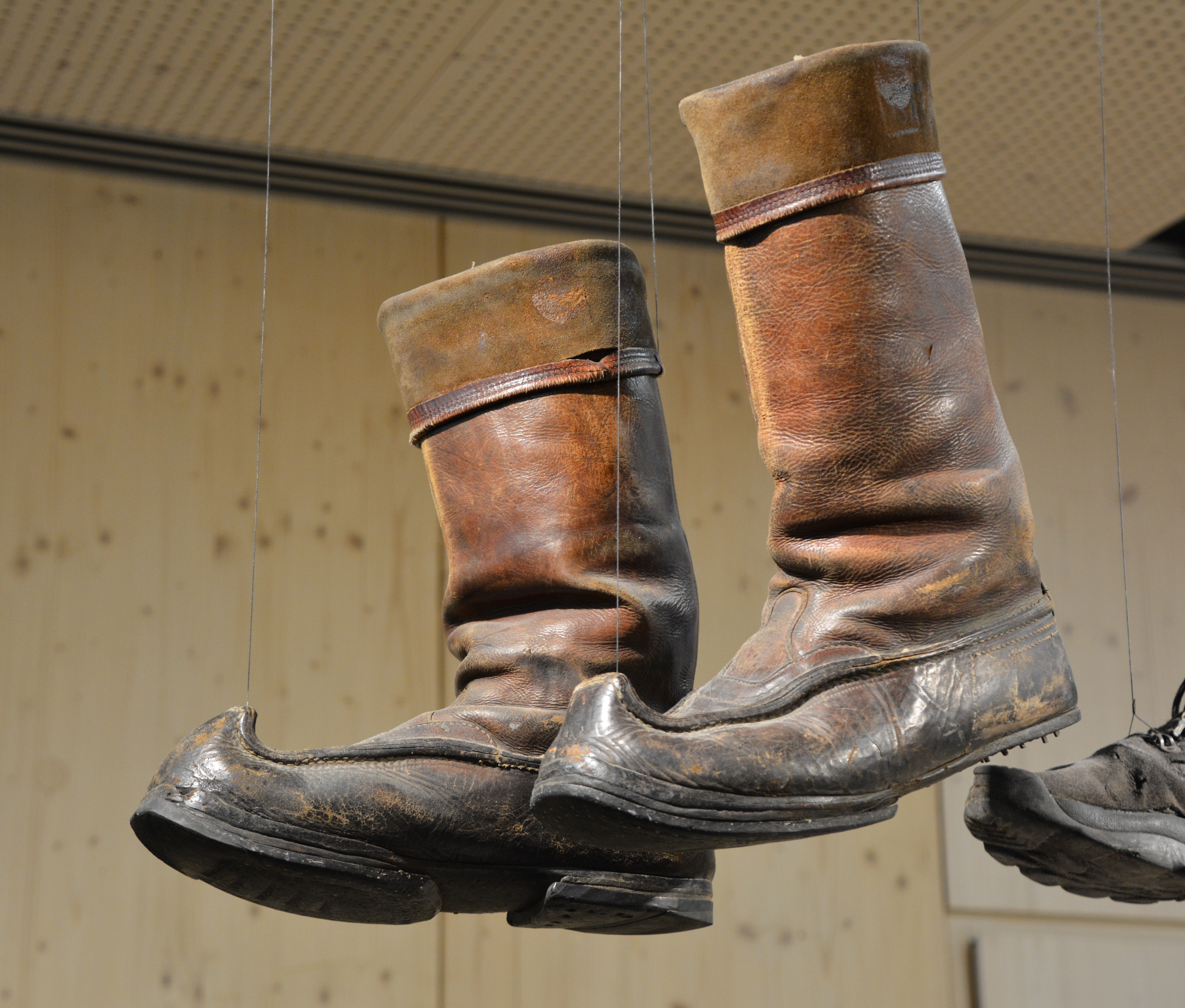
Beaked boots at the Haltia Nature Center, Nuuksio, Finland

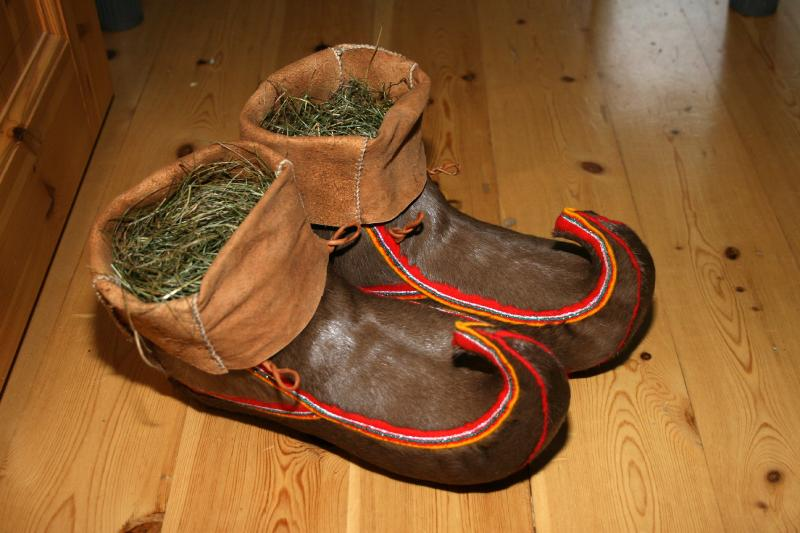
Decorated Sámi beaked shoes

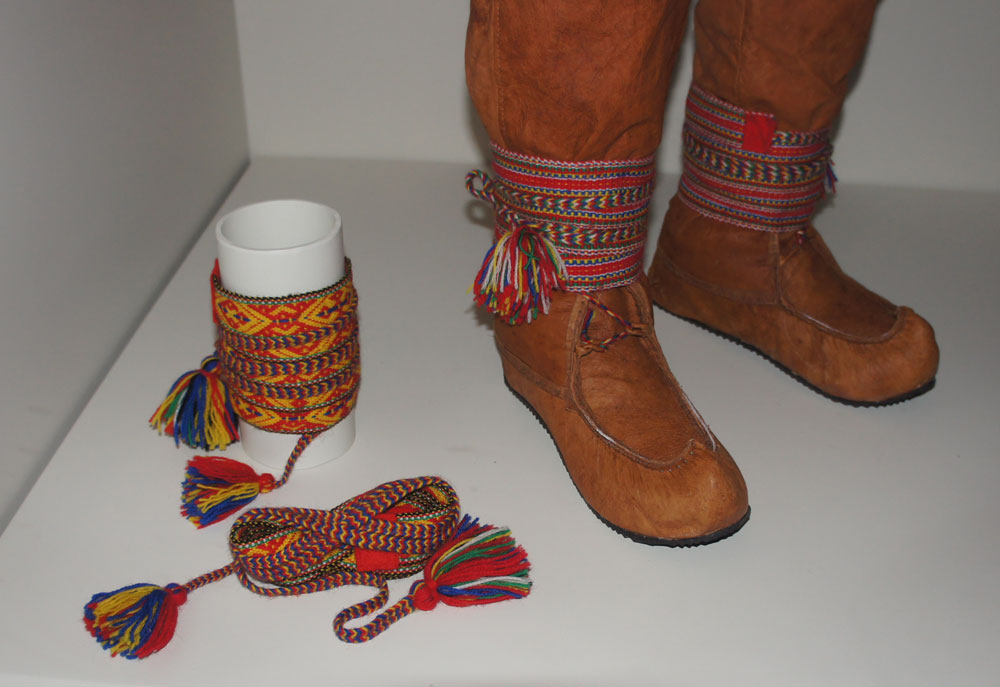
Sámi reaked raindeer herding boots

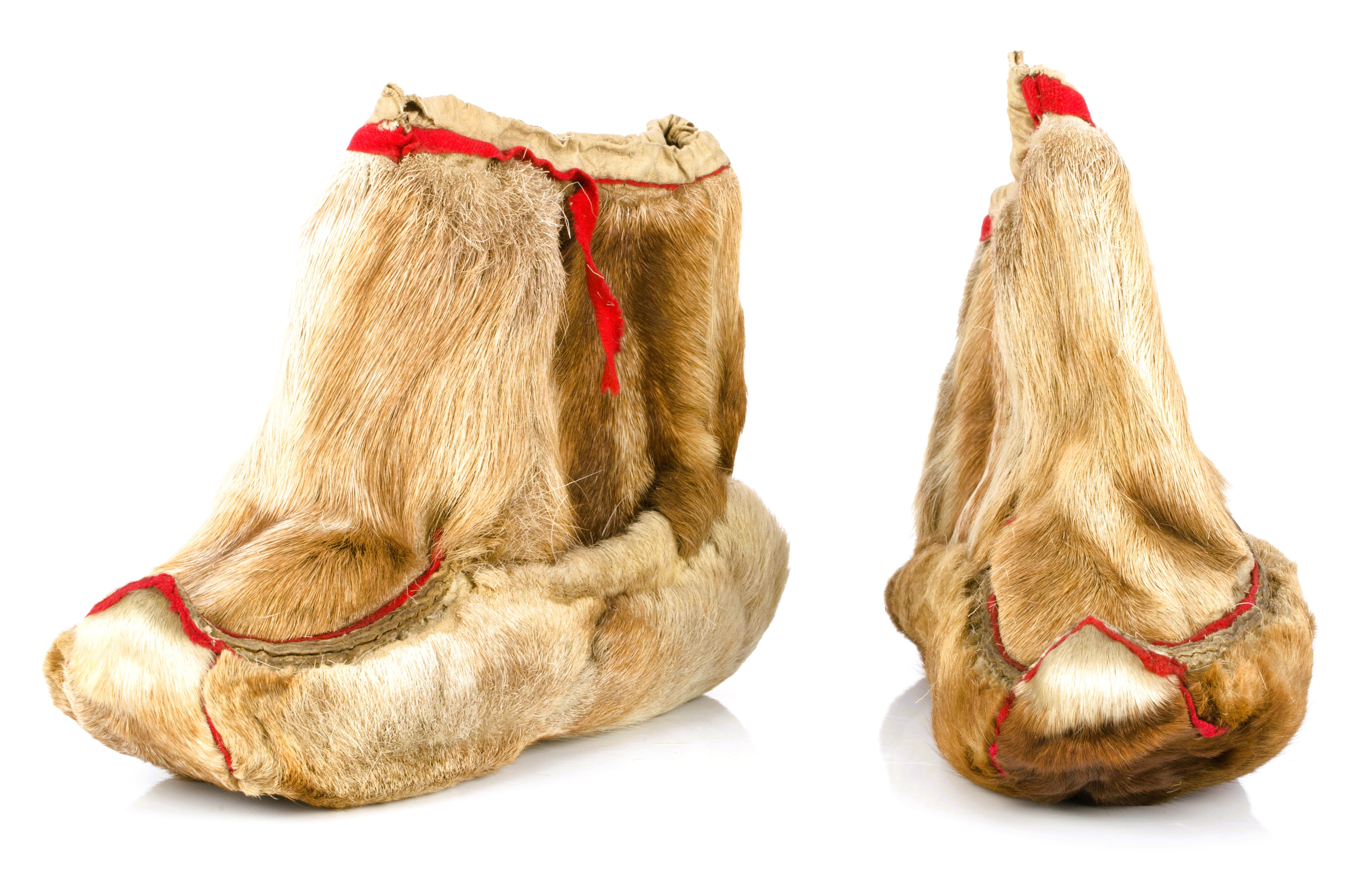
Sámi boots made of raindeer leg skin

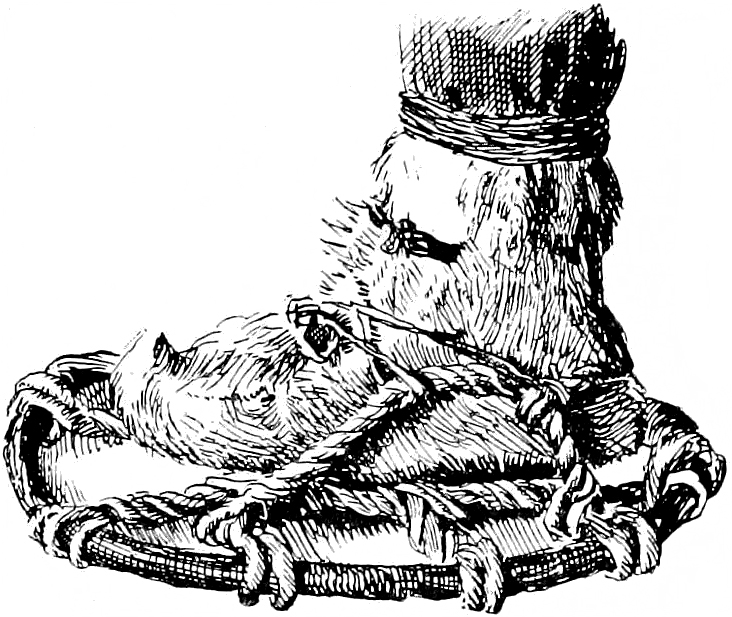
Sámi boots with attached snowshoe

== See also ==
- Ciocia
- Opanak
- Mexican pointy boots
- Pigache
- Poulaine
- Winklepicker
