= Winklepicker =

Style of footwear

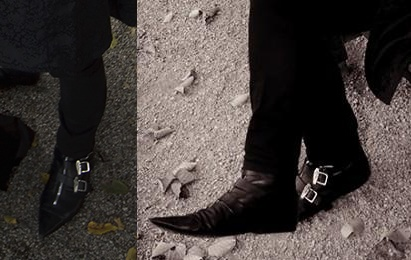
Winklepicker boots, 2009

Winklepickers or winkle pickers are a style of shoe or boot worn from the 1950s onward, especially popular with British rock and roll fans such as Teddy Boys. The feature that gives both the boot and shoe their name is the very sharp and long pointed toe, reminiscent of medieval poulaines and approximately the same as the long pointed toes on some women's high-fashion shoes and boots in the 2000s. They are still popular in the goth, raggare and rockabilly subcultures.

== Names ==
The extremely pointed toe was called a winkle picker because, in England, periwinkle snails ("winkles") were a popular seaside snack which is eaten using a pin or other thin pointed object to carefully extract the soft parts out of the coiled shell. The same practice led to the figurative phrase "to winkle something out". Other countries used other names for the same style, usually similarly humorous. In some parts of the United States, they are called "roach stompers" because of their ability to kill a roach in a corner. In Norway and Sweden, they were called "mosquito chasers" (Norwegian: myggjagere; Swedish: myggjagare).

== History ==
=== Origins ===
Winklepickers, inspired by the Polish poulaines worn by the medieval French nobility, were a conspicuous contrast to the brothel creepers worn by Teddy Boys. The male shoes were lace-up Oxford style with a low heel and an exaggerated pointed toe. A Chelsea boot style (elastic-sided with a two-inch—later as much as two-and-one-half-inch—Cuban heel) was notably worn by the Beatles but although it had a pointed toe, was not considered to be a winklepicker. Winklepicker shoes were also worn by Teddy Girls as well as being a fleeting fashion for young women generally.

=== 1960s ===
In the early 1960s, the winklepicker toe was popular with modernists, teddy boys and rockers. In the early 1960s, the point was effectively chopped off (they hung on for longer than that in the UK) and gave rise to the "chisel toe" on the footwear of all genders. However, winklepickers with traditional sharp-point styles made a comeback of sorts in the late 1970s and early 1980s (either as previously unworn old-stock, second-hand originals, or contemporary-production attempted copies) and worn by several subculture groups including mods, rockers, teddy boys, rockabillies, punks, rock'n'roll revivalists, and in the goth scene, where they are known as "pikes".

Winklepickers with stiletto heels for women swept the UK in the late 1950s, and at one stage, the High Street versions were commonly worn by a large part of the adult female populace of the UK. They were often manufactured in Italy, but the handmade versions, notably those from Stan's Shoes of Battersea, were the most extreme, if somewhat bulky-looking at the toe compared with the Italian styles.

The original 1960s winklepicker stilettos were similar to the long, pointed toe that has been fashionable on women's shoes and boots in Europe of late. The long, sharp toe was always teamed with a stiletto heel (or spike heel), which, as today, could be as low as one-and-a-half inches or as high as five inches, though most were in the three- to four-inch range. The stiletto heels on the original 1960s styles were, however, much more curved in at the rear (also sometimes sharply waisted and slightly flared out at the top piece) than most of the recent pointy-toed fashion shoes, which often have straighter, thicker, more set-back heels, rather at odds with the look of the pointed toe. In most cases, too, the modern shoe toes lack the length of the true 1960s winklepicker and bear more resemblance to the less pointed mass-produced versions of the era.

They attained some notoriety, when they first appeared, as a result of being worn in gang fights (sometimes by both sexes), although there is some question as to the accuracy of contemporary newspaper accounts. In fact, although the winklepicker looks lethal, it would be far more likely for damage to be caused to the delicately pointed shoe than to the opponent in any serious kicking incident.

=== Modern day ===
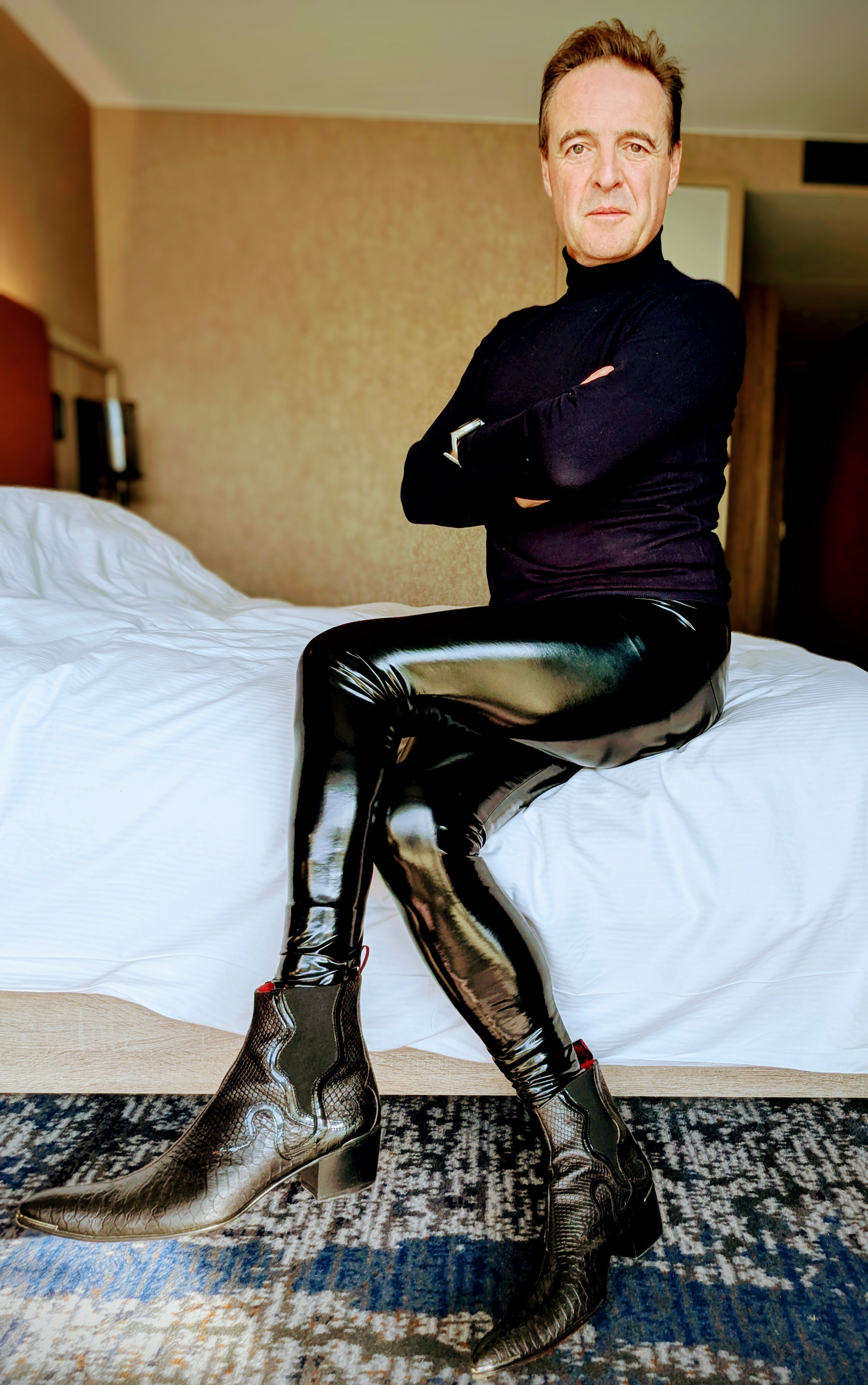
British historian Guy Walters wearing black winklepicker boots

By the middle of the first decade of the 21st century, winklepickers were worn with 1960s mod blazers, Western shirts, vintage T shirts, and skinny jeans by many indie pop bands and musicians, such as of Kings of Leon, Kaiser Chiefs, the Kills, Jack White, Mod Fun, Neils Children, Blanaid Montague, Klaxons, and Daniel Johns. The shoes are closely related to British garage rock band the Horrors, who even went as far as to have a winklepicker boot with three buckles on their official merchandise t-shirt along with the words "I am a horror." Faris Badwan has personally endorsed Paolo Vandini Veers. They are also worn by English comedians Russell Brand and Noel Fielding and English DJ and TV presenter Alex Zane.

Winklepicker boots are very popular in Germany among the modern Vogue goth and punk subcultures, who refer to the boots as "pikes" or "pickers".

Although slightly pointed toes are often a feature of women's fashion shoes, they are usually nowadays "tamed down" or shortened (often sacrificing comfortable toe space) for mass market appeal.

== See also ==
- List of boots
- List of shoe styles
- Pointed shoes
- 1950s in Western fashion
- Chelsea boot and Beatle boot
- Western wear
