= Duckbill shoe =

Type of shoe in the early modern period

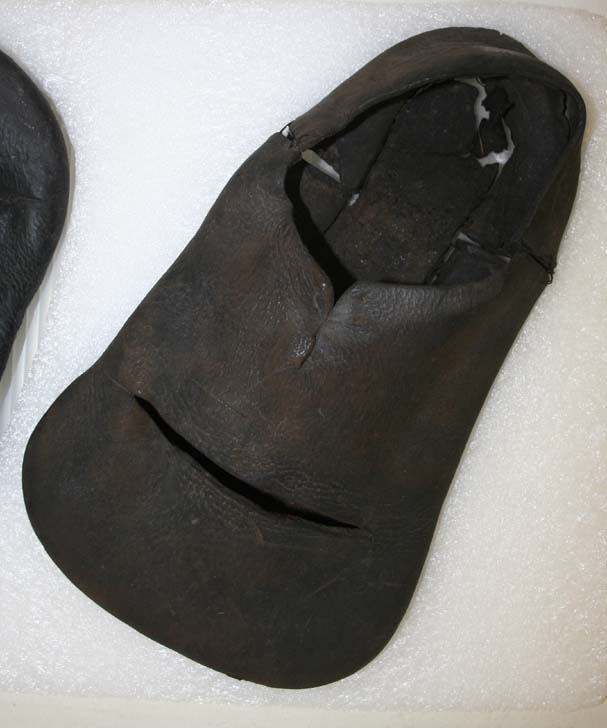
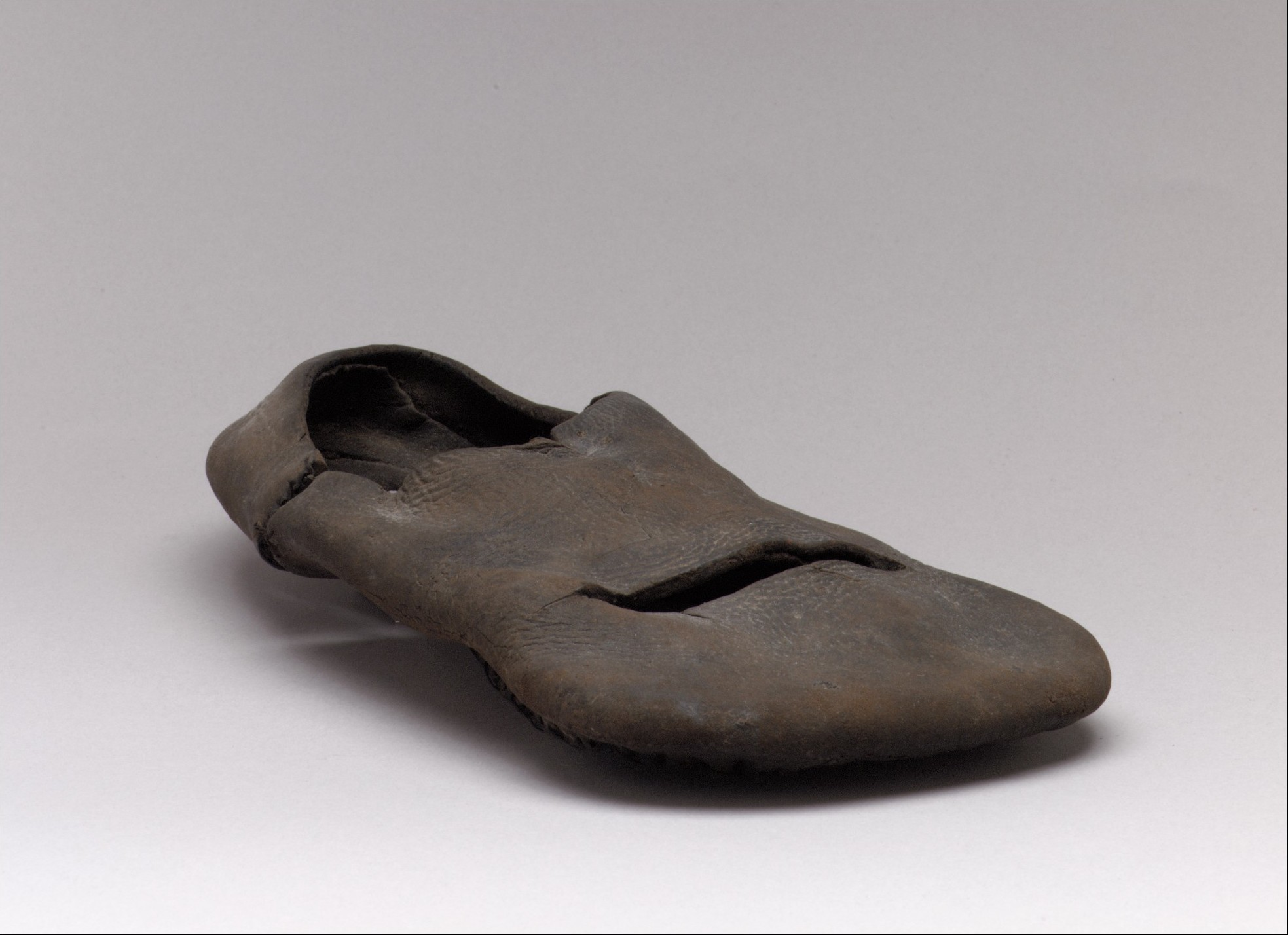
Simple slip-on duck-bill turnshoes, 1500s Britain

A duckbill shoe, also known as a bearpaw shoe or cow's mouth shoe, was a style of shoe with a broad toe which was fashionable in the 15th and 16th centuries. This style started with Charles VIII of France, who had an extra toe, and was later worn by Henry VIII of England. It replaced the excessively long toe of the poulaine but also tended to become impractical, as it became enlarged with stuffing and horns and so could be a foot wide, giving the wearer a waddling gait. It might also be adorned with slashes to show the fine lining, and sumptuary laws were introduced to restrict all these excesses. Duckbill shoes were rounded like a duck's bill; cowsmouth shoes widened abruptly at the toes; and bearsclaw shoes had slashes parallel to the toes, so the toe could expand laterally.

There is a surviving design for a duckbill shoe by Albrecht Dürer; he describes it as made on an absolutely straight, symmetric last, and as having an entirely flat sole of two thicknesses of leather. The shoes he designed were also to have straps over the instep.

Broad-toed shoes were worn by men, women, and children

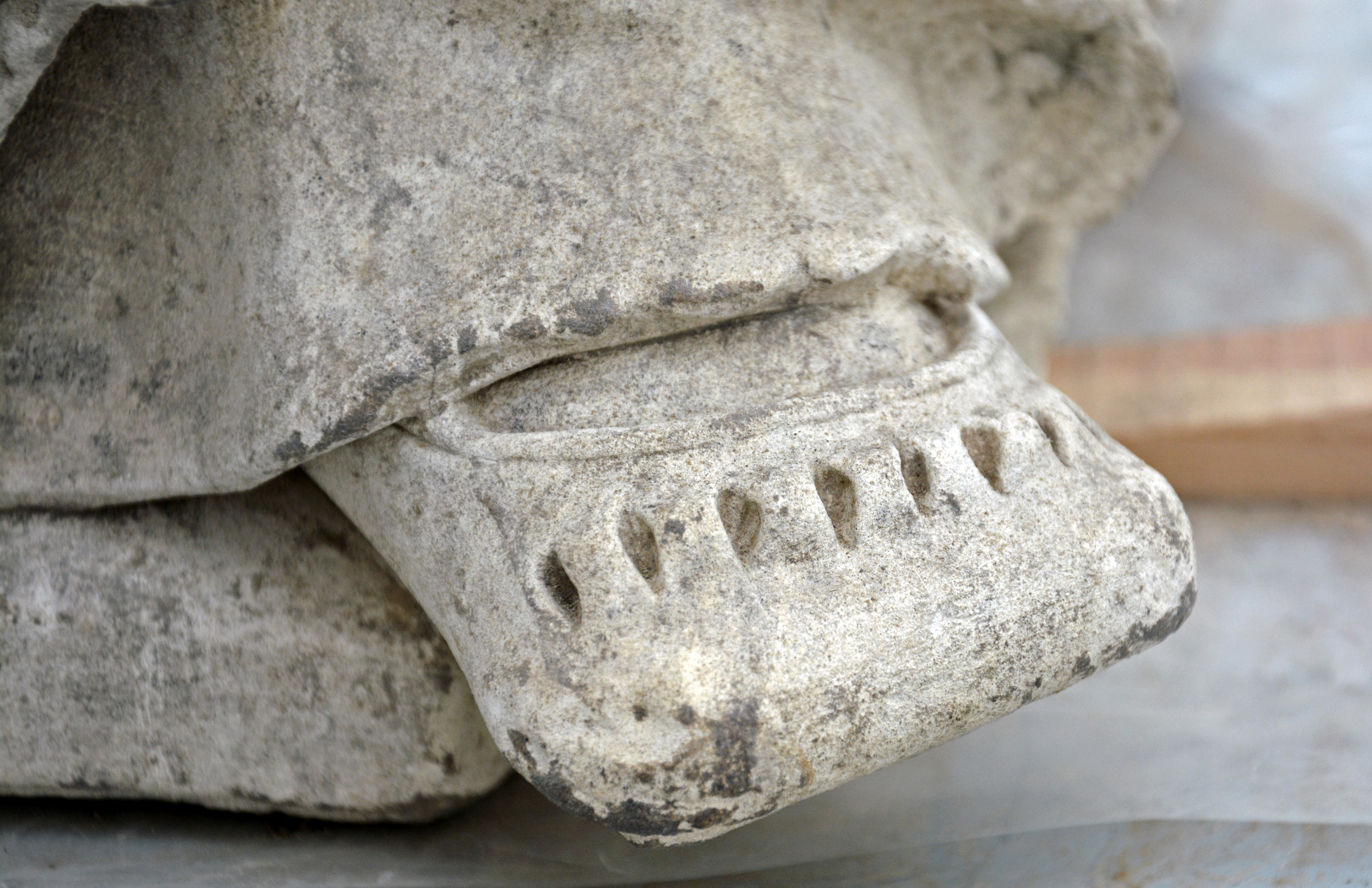
Foot of a statue of Mary Magdalene

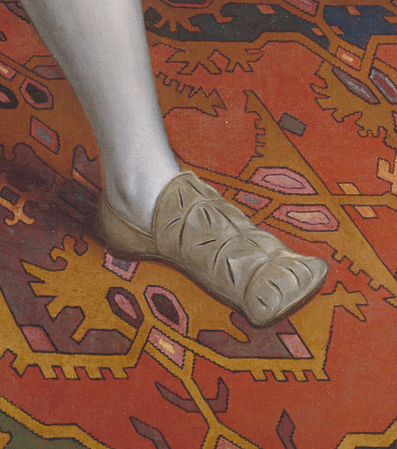
Foot of Henry VIII (cow-mouth shoe)

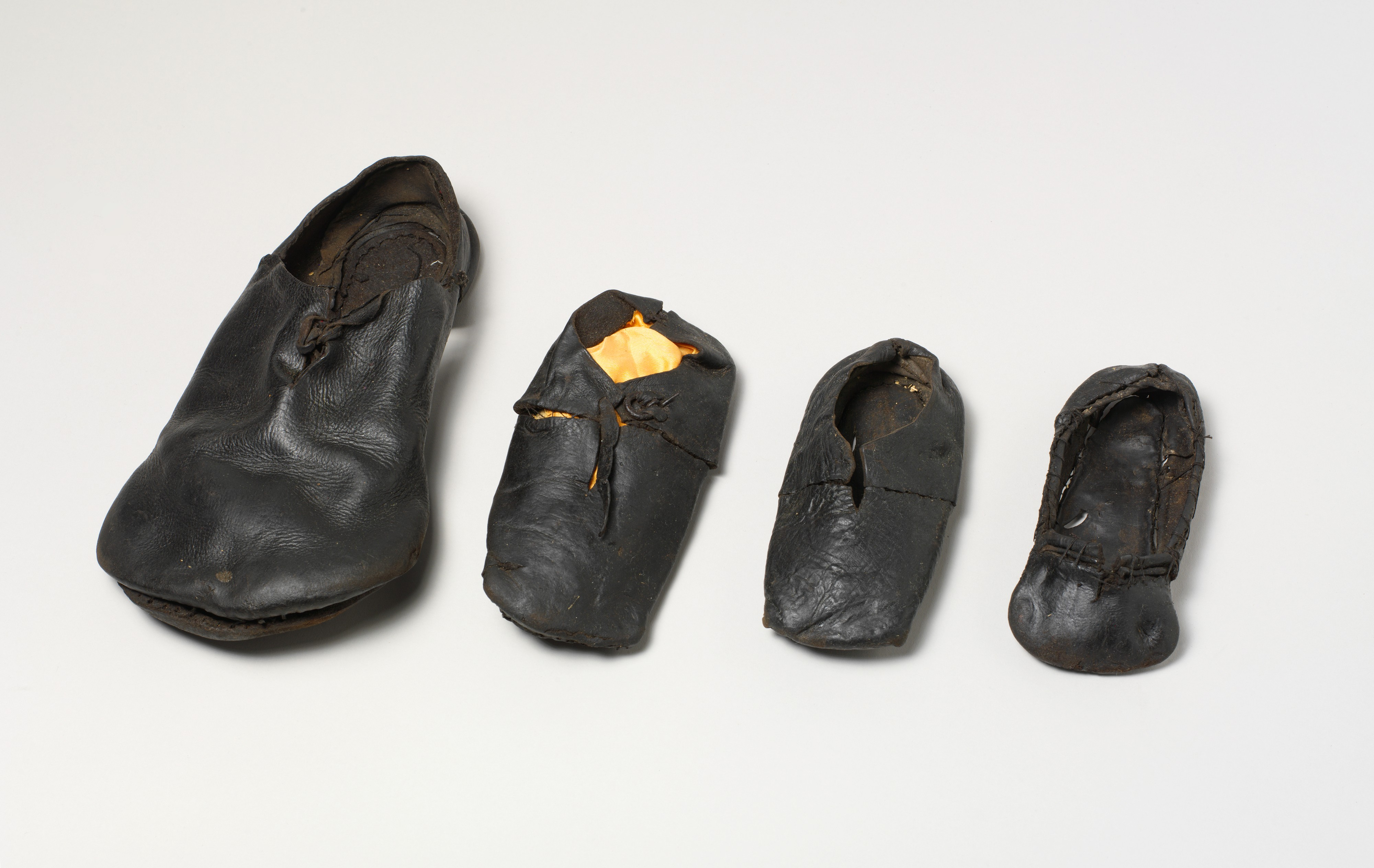
Children's shoes

== See also ==
- List of shoe styles
- Pigache – a pointed style of shoe which was fashionable earlier in medieval Europe
