= Sabaton =

Medieval foot and ankle armor

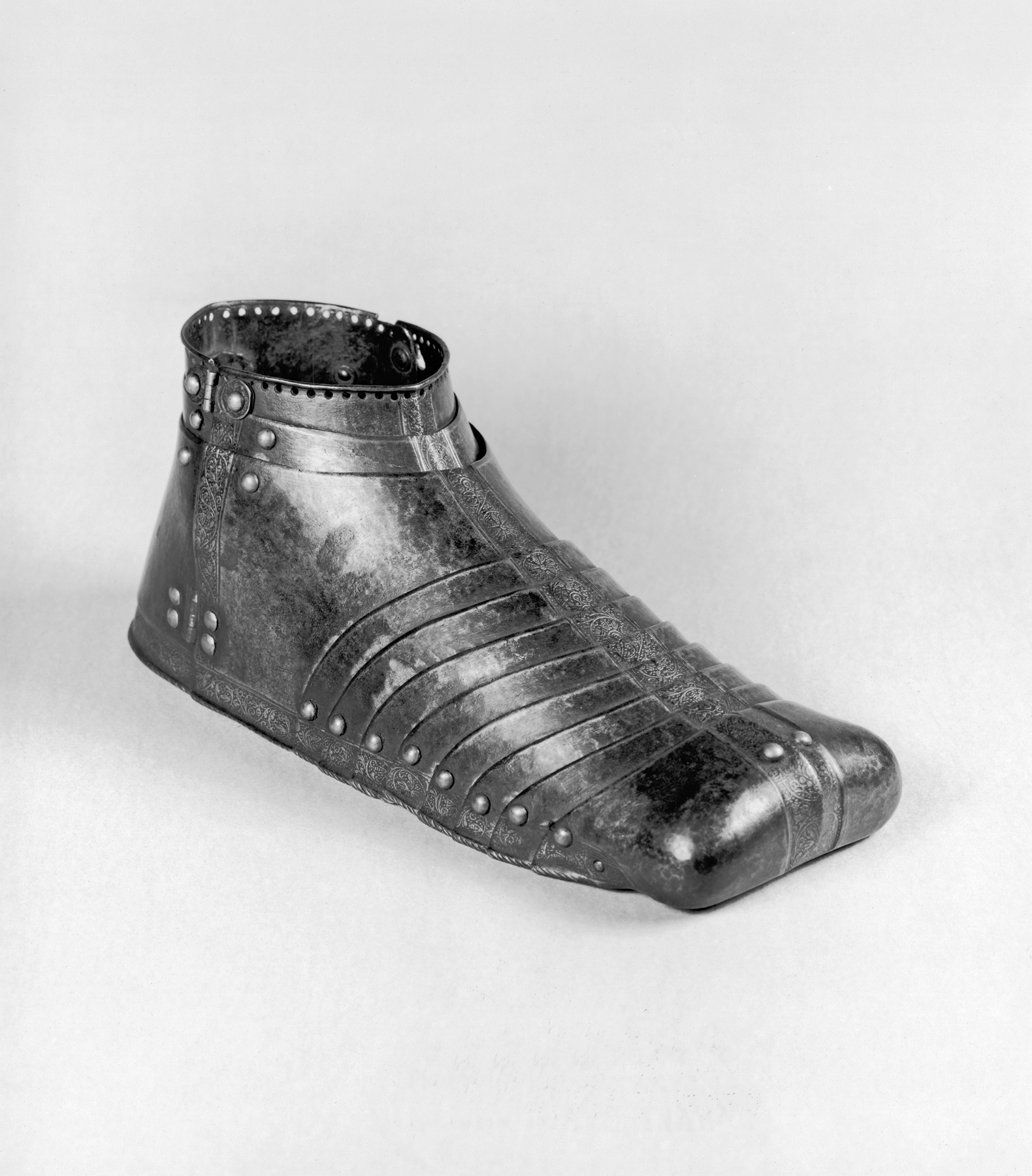
A duckbill-style German sabaton for the right foot, c. 1550

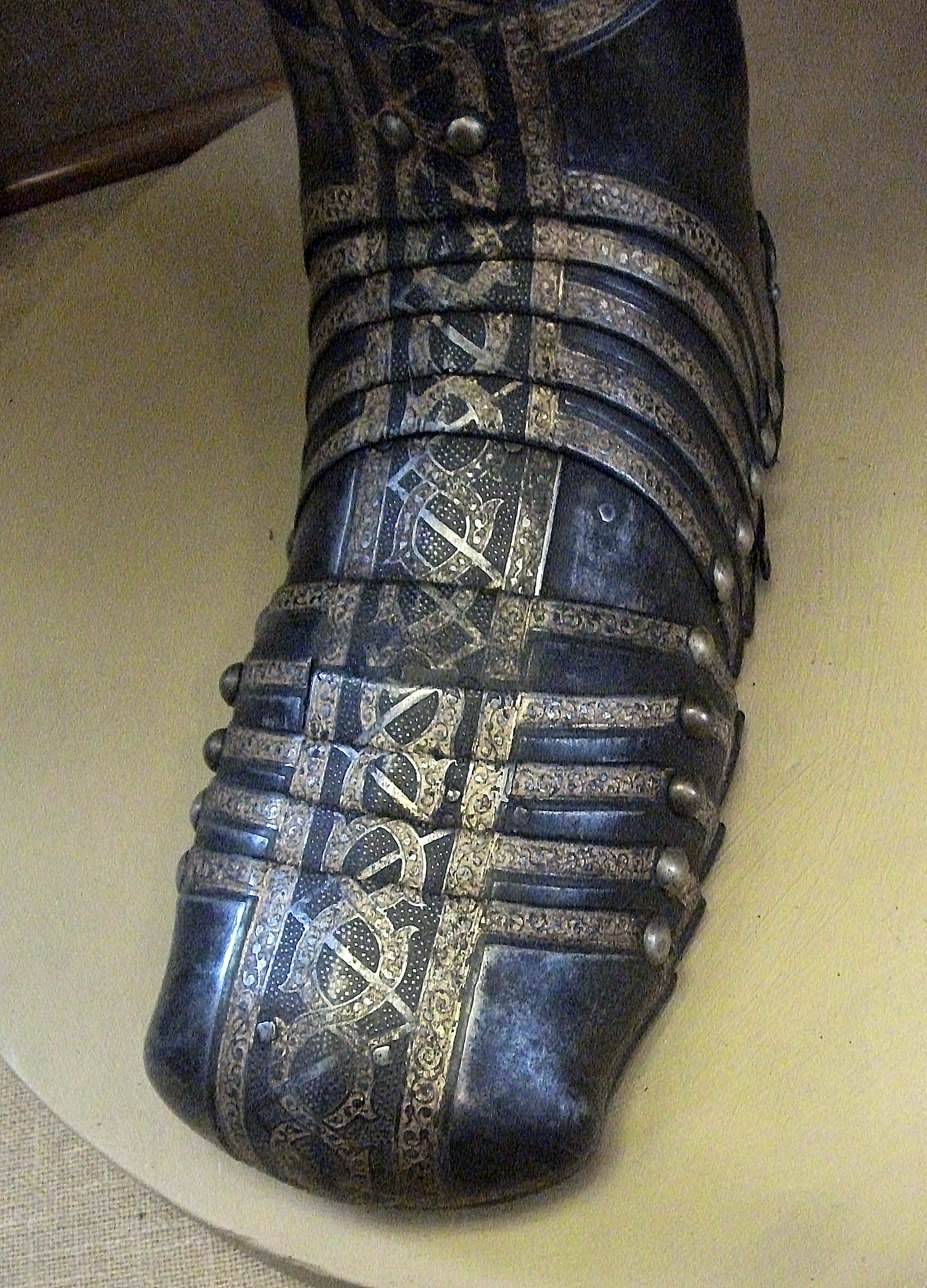
English-made Greenwich armour sabaton, 1587–1589

A sabaton or solleret is part of a knight's body armor that covers the foot.

== History ==
Sabatons from the 14th and 15th centuries typically end in a tapered point well past the actual toes of the wearer's foot, following fashionable shoe shapes of the era. Sabatons of the late 15th and early 16th century followed the duckbill shoes of the time, ending at the tip of the toe but often extending greatly wider. The sabatons were the first piece of armour to be put on, and were made of riveted iron plates called lames. These plates generally covered only the top of the foot.

The OED gives the definition of sabaton specifically as the broad-toed variant of foot armour, yet says that the word is attested from 1330, over a century before this form became fashionable, so the accuracy of this specificity of form within the definition is questionable. The Middle English Dictionary has an earlier form, sabatoun, meaning both armour for the foot (with neither broad-toed nor pointy-toed form specified) and a type of slipper or shoe. The MED also has the term solier (from the Old French soler meaning "shoe") as a form of foot armour, but does not have its diminutive solleret, which seems to be a modern term as it is first attested in the OED in 1826.

An earlier solution was for the mail of the chausses to completely cover the foot, but later the mail terminated at the ankle, either overlapping the outside of the sabaton or extending beneath it.

The effigy of Richard Beauchamp, 13th Earl of Warwick in the Collegiate Church of St Mary, Warwick, shows how 15th century Italian-style sabatons would have been worn. These consist of a toe cap, four articulated lames, a foot plate and ankle plate, and a hinged heel cap, joined with buckled straps. Although the spurs are missing from the effigy, remains of rivet holes and staples may represent the way that the spurs would have been directly attached to the heel cap of the sabaton, rather than being strapped on afterwards.

== Other uses ==
"Sabaton" is also the name of a type of broad-toed Flemish shoe, popular in the Late Middle Ages.

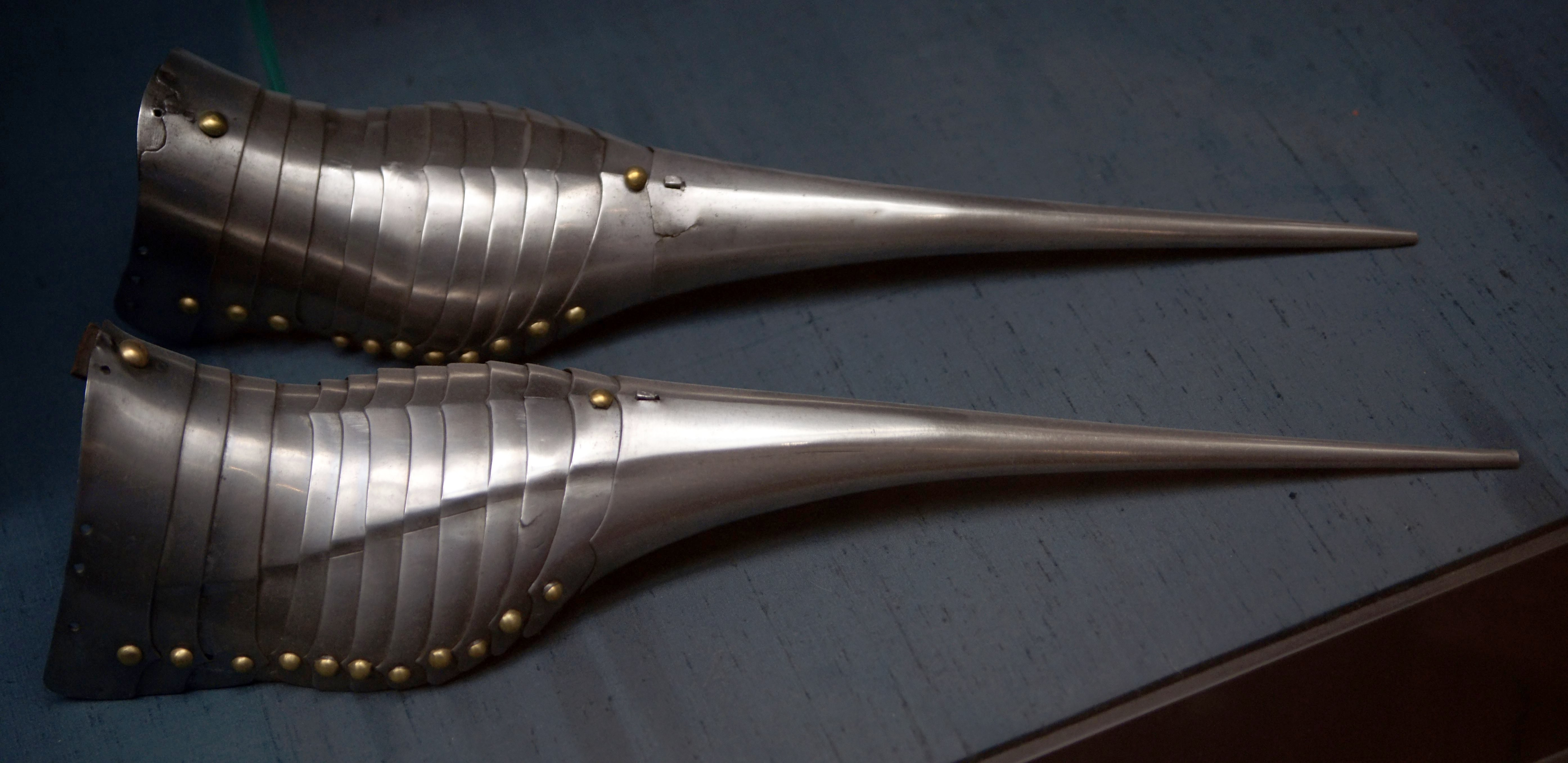
Sabatons of Emperor Maximilian I, c. 1485

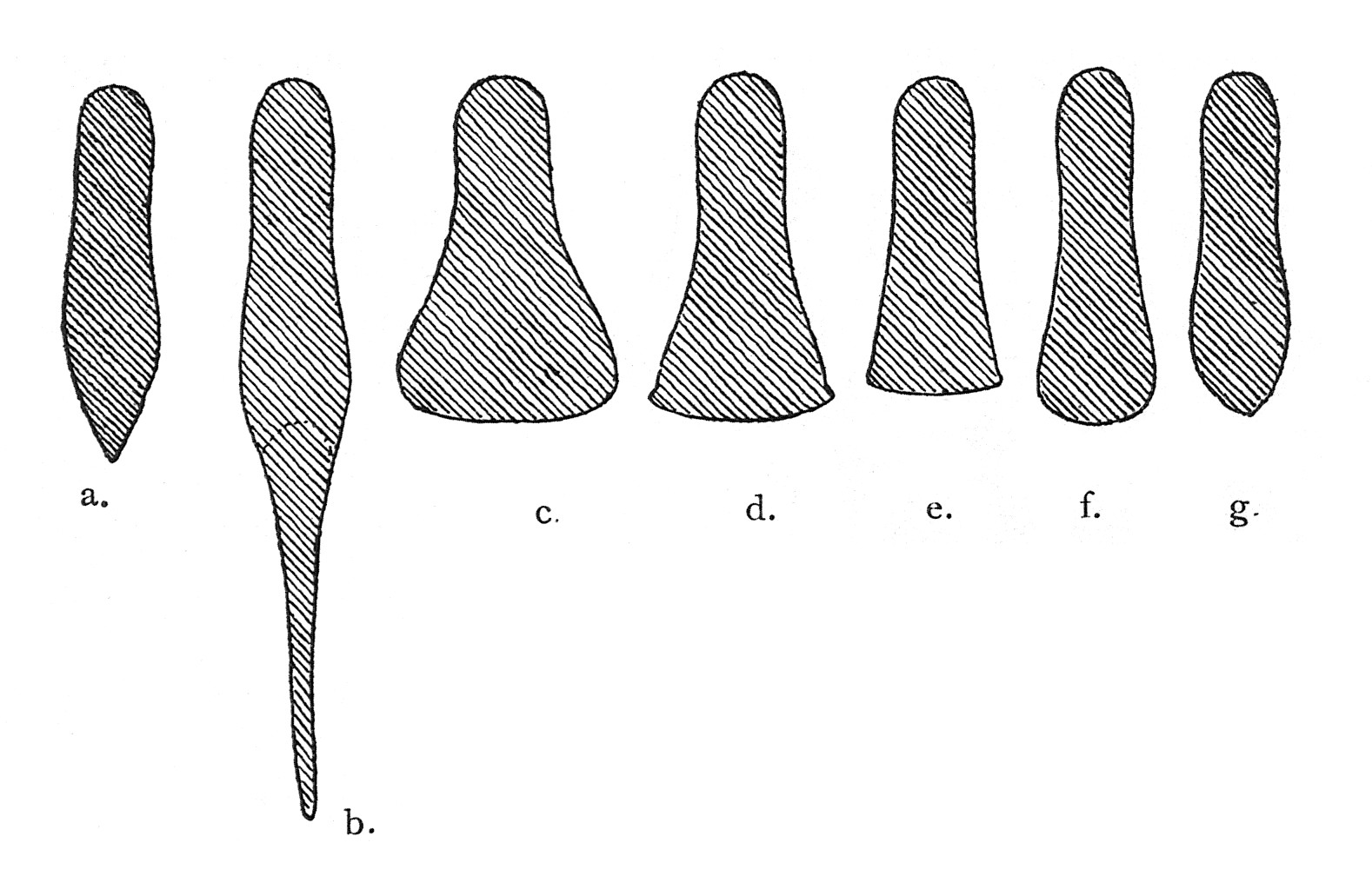
Sabatons' shape evolution by Wendelin Boeheim:
1. 1290–1390
2. 1300–1490
3. 1500–1530
4. 1530–1540
5. 1540–1550
6. 1550–1560
7. 1560–1590

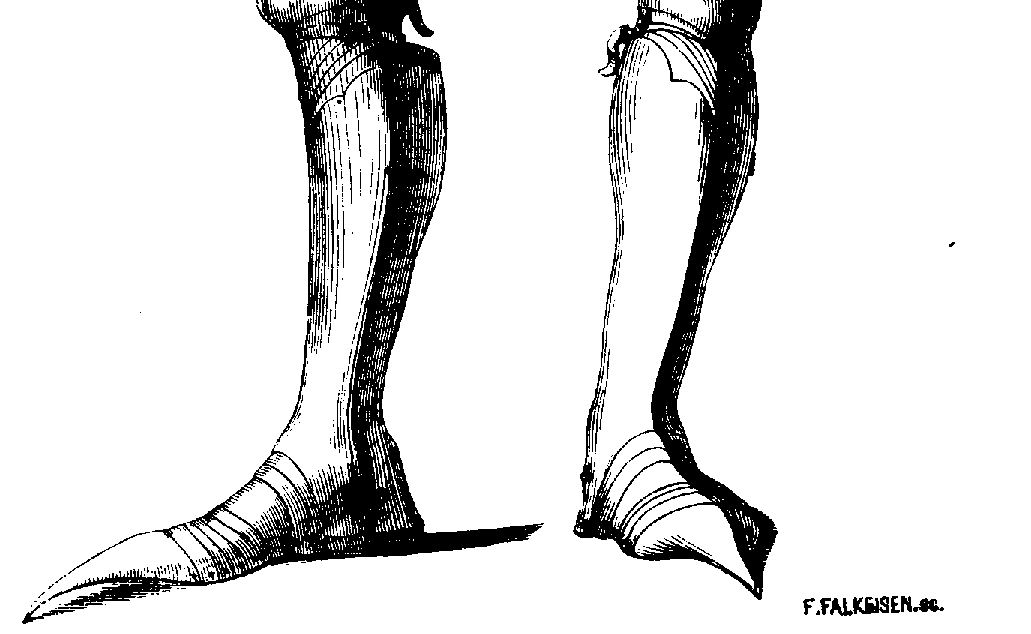
Sabatons with tapered points (poulaines, pikes, or beaks)

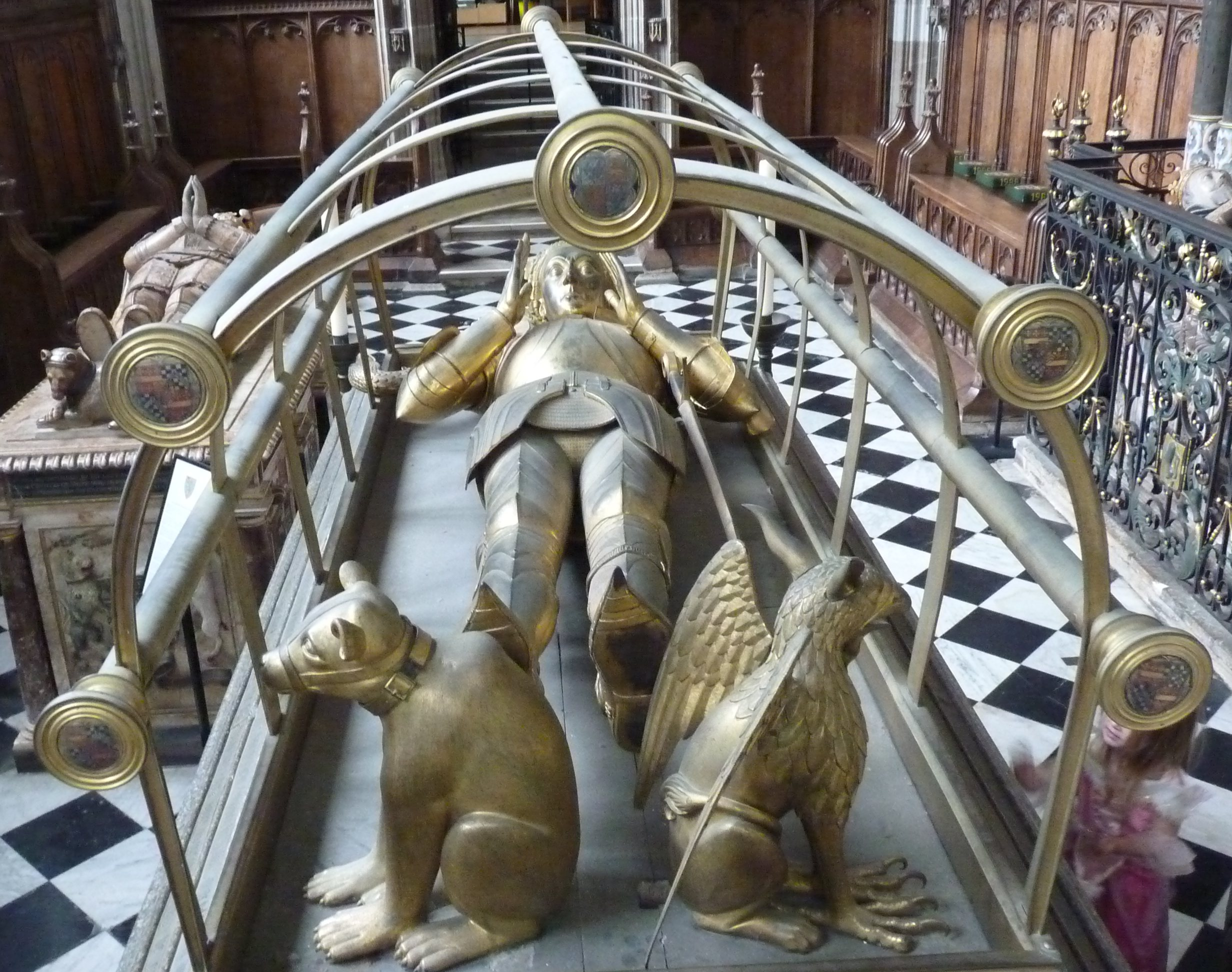
Gilded bronze effigy at Warwick, England, of Richard Beauchamp, 13th Earl of Warwick who died in 1439, showing the underside of his sabatons

== See also ==
- List of shoe styles
