= Borrowing (linguistics) =

Process of language formation

In linguistics, borrowing is a type of language change in which a language or dialect undergoes change as a result of contact with another language or dialect. In typical cases of borrowing, speakers of one language (the "recipient" language) adopt into their own speech a novel linguistic feature that they were exposed to due to its presence in a different language (the "source" or "donor" language).

== Lexical borrowing ==
The most common type of borrowing is for a word that originated in one language to come to be used in another; this is because individual words are relatively superficial components of a language, and a new word can be easily incorporated into the lexicon without disrupting other existing structural features of the recipient language. Words that have been borrowed in this way are known as loanwords. Loanwords often appear in the recipient language in a somewhat different form than they have in the source language, typically undergoing some degree of modification or adaptation in order to fit comfortably into the recipient's phonology and morphology. An alternative to borrowing a loanword directly is the creation of a calque, in which a new word is created using the existing resources of the recipient language by literally translating the morphemes of a word from the source language.

== Borrowing of other elements ==
Although individual words are by far the most likely component of language to undergo borrowing, it is possible for other components of linguistic structure to be borrowed, including bound morphemes, syntactic patterns, and even phonemes. Borrowing of elements more abstract than simple vocabulary is especially likely to take place in cases of language shift, when the recipient language replaces the source language as the primary language of a given speech community; when contact between the source and recipient languages is particularly intensive and long-term, as in a Sprachbund, leading to language convergence; or when the borrowing takes place between closely related dialects that are mutually intelligible to each other. The borrowing of features between dialects is the basis of the wave model of language change.

== Role of borrowing in historical linguistics ==
When a word in one language is similar to a word in another, one potential explanation for the similarity is that the word was borrowed by one language from the other, or that both borrowed it from some third source. Loanwords must therefore be carefully distinguished from cognates—i.e., similarities between languages that are the result of shared inheritance from a common ancestor. Unlike cognates, borrowing may take place between languages that are unrelated to each other and have no common origin. When attempting to identify language families and trace their history through the comparative method, loanwords must be identified and excluded from analysis in order to determine whether evidence of shared ancestry exists.

Historical linguists occasionally appeal to borrowing to explain apparent exceptions to the regularity of sound change. According to the prevailing Neogrammarian hypothesis, changes in the pronunciation of a phoneme are expected to affect all words containing the phoneme in the appropriate context. However, some apparent exceptions exist: for instance, the earlier phoneme /f/ at the beginning of a word appears to have become /v/ in English vat, vane, and vixen (from Old English fatu, fana, and fyxin respectively), but not in other words beginning with /f/. This apparent irregularity is explained by positing that these words were borrowed into Standard English from a regional dialect in which /f/ did regularly become /v/ (such as West Country English), while other words containing /f/ were not borrowed.
