= History of Poland in the Middle Ages =

This article covers the history of Poland in the Middle Ages. This time covers roughly a millennium, from the 5th century to the 16th century. It is commonly dated from the Fall of the Western Roman Empire, and contrasted with a later Early Modern Period. The time during which the rise of humanism in the Italian Renaissance and the Reformation unfolded is generally associated with the transition out of the Middle Ages, with European overseas expansion as a succeeding process, but such dates are approximate and based upon nuanced arguments.

== Early Middle Ages ==
The first waves of Slavic migration settled the area of the upper Vistula River and elsewhere in the lands of present-day southeastern Poland and southern Masovia, coming from the upper and middle regions of the Dnieper River. Results of a genetic study by researchers from Gdańsk Medical University "support hypothesis placing the earliest known homeland of Slavs in the middle Dnieper basin". The West Slavs came primarily from the more western early Slavic branch called the Sclaveni by the Byzantine historian Jordanes in Getica, the eastern branch being the Antes.^{[a]} The Slavs had first migrated into Poland in the second half of the 5th century, some half century after these territories had been vacated by Germanic tribes (after a period during which settlements were absent or rare). According to the references given in this and Poland in the Early Middle Ages article, many scholars now believe that the Slavic tribes had not been present in Poland before the earliest medieval period,^{[b]} though the opposite view, predominant in Polish prehistory and protohistory in the past, is still represented.

From there, over the 6th century, the new population dispersed north and west. The Slavs lived mostly by cultivating crops but also engaged in hunting and gathering. Their migrations took place while Eastern and Central Europe were being invaded from the east by waves of peoples and armies such as the Huns, Avars and Magyars.

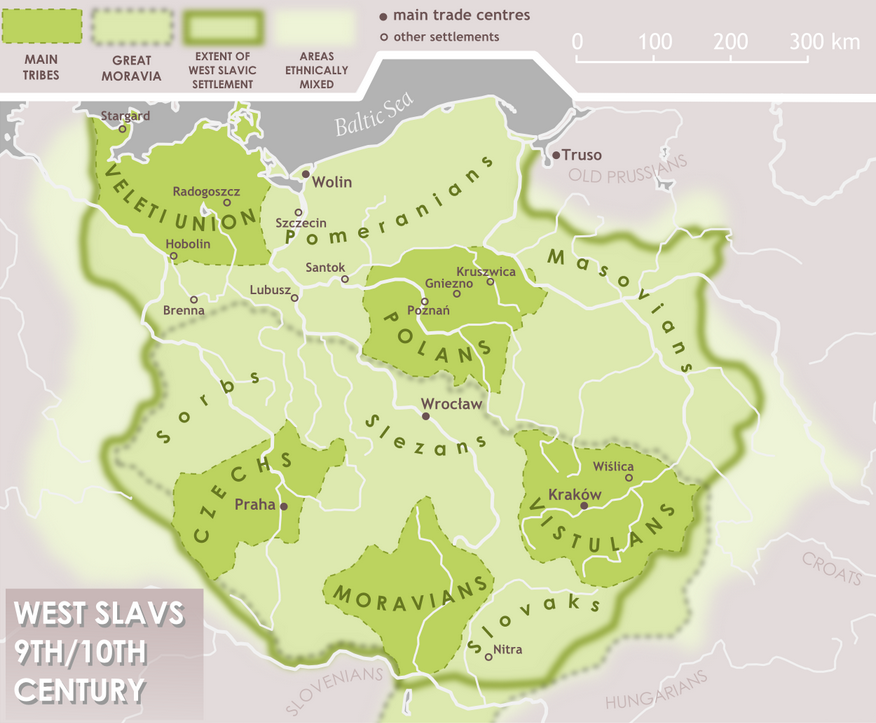
West Slavic tribes in 9th/10th century (Slovaks did not exist in the 9th/10th century)

A number of West Slavic Polish tribes formed small states, beginning in the 8th century, some of which later coalesced into larger states. Among these tribes were the Vistulans (Wiślanie) in southern Poland, with Kraków and Wiślica as their main centers (major fortified centers were built in their country in the 9th century), but later the tribe(s) referred to as the Polans (Polanie—literally, "people of the fields") would prove of decisive historic importance. At the end of the 9th century Vistulans were part of the Great Moravia, according to some theories.

The tribal states built many gords – fortified structures with earthen and wooden walls and embankments – from the 7th century onward. Some of these were developed and inhabited; others featured a large empty space and may have served primarily as refuges in times of trouble. The Polans settled the plains around Giecz, Poznań and Gniezno that would become the early center of Poland and lent their name to the country. They went through a period of accelerated building of gord-type fortified settlements and of territorial expansion, beginning in the first half of the 10th century, and the Polish state developed from their tribal polities in the second half of the 10th century.

== High Middle Ages ==
The Polish state begins with the rule of Mieszko I of the Piast dynasty in the second half of the 10th century. Mieszko chose to be baptized in the Western Latin Church in 966. Following its emergence, the Polish nation was led by a series of rulers who converted the population to Christianity, created a strong kingdom and integrated Poland into the European culture. Mieszko's son Bolesław I Chrobry established a Polish Church province, pursued territorial conquests and was officially crowned, becoming the first King of Poland. This was followed by a collapse of the monarchy and restoration under Casimir I. Casimir's son Bolesław II the Bold became fatally involved in a conflict with the ecclesiastical authority, and was expelled from the country. After Bolesław III divided the country among his sons, internal fragmentation eroded the initial Piast monarchy structure in the 12th and 13th centuries. One of the regional Piast dukes invited the Teutonic Knights to help him fight the Baltic Prussian pagans, which caused centuries of Poland's warfare with the Knights and then with the German Prussian state. The Kingdom was restored under Władysław I the Elbow-high, strengthened and expanded by his son Casimir III the Great. The western provinces of Silesia and Pomerania were lost after the fragmentation, and Poland began expanding to the east. The consolidation in the 14th century laid the base for, after the reigns of two members of the Angevin dynasty, the new powerful Kingdom of Poland that was to follow.

== Late Middle Ages ==
Beginning with the Lithuanian Grand Duke Jogaila (Władysław II Jagiełło), the Jagiellon dynasty (1385–1569) formed the Polish–Lithuanian union. The partnership brought vast Lithuania-controlled Rus' areas into Poland's sphere of influence and proved beneficial for the Poles and Lithuanians, who coexisted and cooperated in one of the largest political entities in Europe for the next four centuries. In the Baltic Sea region Poland's struggle with the Teutonic Knights continued and included the milestone Peace of Thorn under King Casimir IV Jagiellon; the treaty created the future Duchy of Prussia. In the south Poland confronted the Ottoman Empire and the Crimean Tatars, and in the east helped Lithuania fight the Grand Duchy of Moscow. Poland was developing as a feudal state, with predominantly agricultural economy and an increasingly dominant landed nobility component. The Nihil novi act adopted by the Polish Sejm (parliament) in 1505, transferred most of the legislative power from the monarch to the Sejm. This event marked the beginning of the period known as "Golden Liberty", when the state was ruled by the "free and equal" Polish nobility. Protestant Reformation movements made deep inroads into the Polish Christianity, which resulted in unique at that time in Europe policies of religious tolerance. The European Renaissance currents evoked in late Jagiellon Poland (kings Sigismund I the Old and Sigismund II Augustus) an immense cultural flowering. Poland's and Lithuania's territorial expansion included the far north region of Livonia.

== See also ==
- Culture of medieval Poland
- Obotrites
- Principality of Nitra

== Notes ==
a. "Though their names are now dispersed amid various clans and places, yet they are chiefly called Sclaveni and Antes"; transl. by Charles Christopher Mierow, Princeton University Press 1908, from the University of Calgary web site

b. This is the so-called allochthonic theory; according to the autochthonic theory the opposite is true
