= Ciociaria in cinematography =

In Italian literature, some folkloric words like Ciociaria and ciociari are used to denote people, film settings, and characters in Italian neorealist works.

Many writers say they found poetical inspiration in lands south of Rome thanks to diverse local traditions, ancient rural landscapes and provincialism. Those characters belong to a geographical region between Tevere and Garigliano, where artists such as Alberto Moravia, Elsa Morante, Cesare Zavattini, Cesare Pascarella, Pier Paolo Pasolini, Giuseppe De Santis, and Vittorio De Sica lived, producing novels and movies.

== History ==
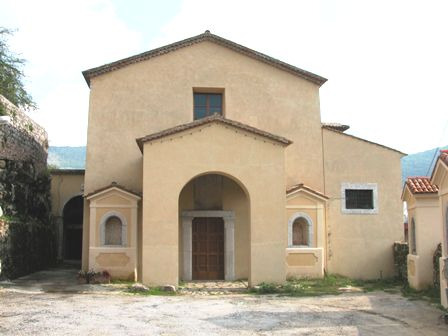
Location of Two Women in Vallecorsa

In 1960 De Sica made the film "Two Women" in Vallecorsa, where he represented Moravia's novel "La Ciociara". This was the first time that the terms ciociari and Ciociaria appeared in Italian cinematography. Afterwards, some film makers of Italian neorealism who lived in southern Lazio called this land Ciociaria, as did the landscapes they represented in some movies.

The term was taken both from ancient books of voyages like Pascarella's Viaggio in Ciociaria and from fascist historical searches about the province of Frosinone and "ruralization". In this uncertain context De Santis considered Ciociaria in cinematography as a topos with which the oppressions of poor peasants were expressed. He directly showed this point of view in his movie Non c'è pace tra gli ulivi.

Between Miracles is another movie in which Ciociaria is evoked, following a public statement by author Nino Manfredi, who said that the plot represents a part of his life during which he was a contemporary rebel and felt repressed, in Ciociaria, where he was born.

In common language, terms like Ciociaria and Ciociari are used to denote any movies set in southern Latium as well as many actors who were born in the provinces of Frosinone or Latina. Some people think the term Ciociaro is an insult, and refuse to be called by the term. An Italian spot where Sofia Loren was called Ciociara has been contested by some politicians in Lazio because they considered that term offensive. (in Italian)

== Movies and locations ==
- La Ciociara (Vittorio De Sica - Fondi, province of Latina)
- For Love and Gold (M. Monicelli - Jenne, sets in province of Rome)
- Bread, Love and Dreams (Luigi Comencini, where Gina Lollobrigida and Vittorio De Sica name "Forca d'Acero Wood", in Comino Valley).
- Gli onorevoli di Sergio Corbucci, Totò is Antonio La Trippa Roccasecca's syndi in Province of Frosinone.
- Between Miracles (Nino Manfredi, sets in Fontana Liri, Province of Frosinone).
- Straziami ma di baci saziami di Dino Risi (1966), Nino Manfredi is a barber of Alatri.
- San Pasquale Baylonne protettore delle donne (1976), sets in Settefrati and Posta Fibreno, province of Frosinone.

== Sources ==
- Zangrilli F., Bonaviri G., La Ciociaria tra letteratura e cinema, Metauro ed., Pesaro 2002
- Pascarella C., Viaggio in Ciociaria, Roma 1920.
