= Ciociaria =

Historic area in Italy

External videos
- “How an old Italian dialect compares to standard Italian”, February 28, 2018

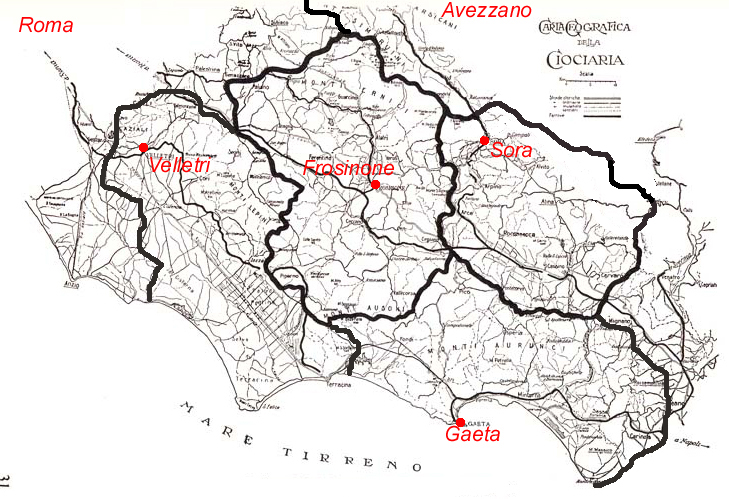
Map of "Grande Ciociaria" with 1889 cities indicated

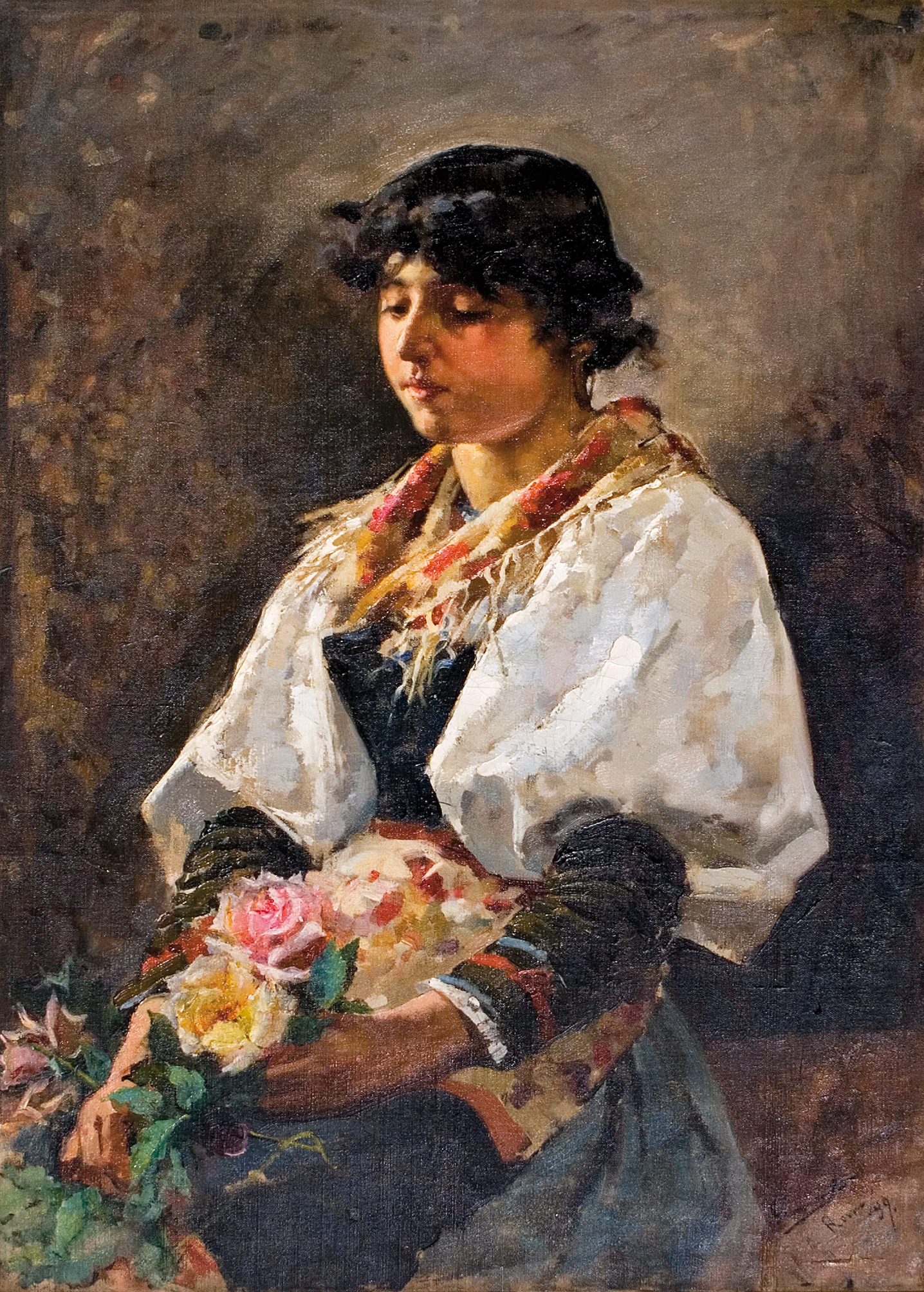
Ciociara by Enrique Simonet

Ciociaria (Italian pronunciation: [tʃotʃaˈriːa]) is the name commonly used, in modern times, for some impoverished territories southeast of Rome, without defined geographical limits. Starting from the Fascist Italy period and the creation of the province of Frosinone, the same name was arbitrarily imposed by the local Italian fascist organizations, and then misused by the local press, by promotional associations and folkloristic events as a synonym for Frosinone and all the popular traditions of its territory.

The local dialect is referred to as campanino in old literature. It is merely a local variants of Central-Italian Latian but is improperly indicated as "ciociaro dialect", although the linguistic and scientific definition is Central-Northern Latian. In more recent times, the term Campagna Romana, or Roman Campagna, a favorite subject of countless painters from all over Europe, referred to the adjoining region to the north of Ciociaria but part of the province of Rome.

== Origin of the name ==
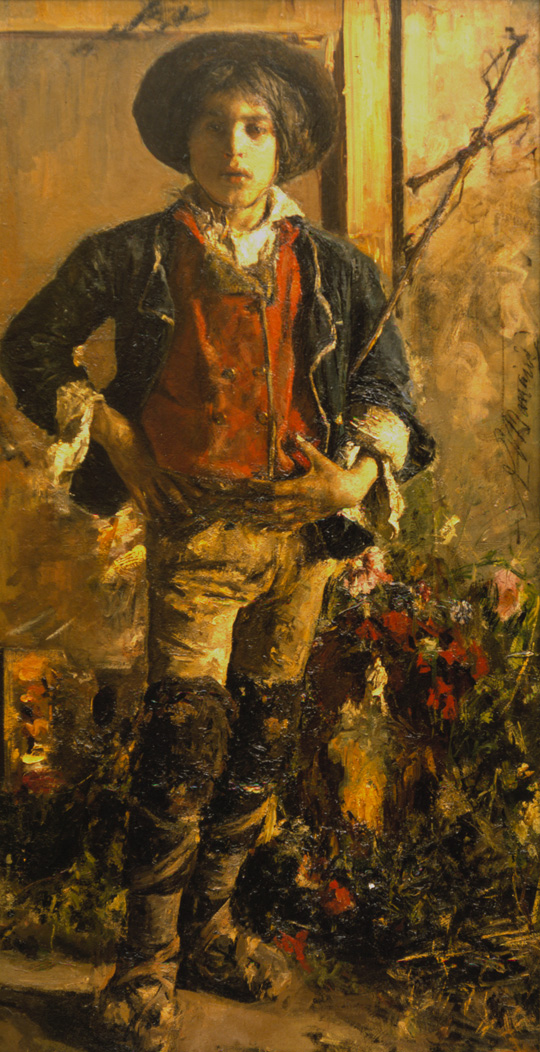
Shepherd boy wearing ciocie

The term first appears in a map of the Papal States, in which a land in Campagna e Marittima province is named Ciociarìa. The variant Cioceria has been used since the 18th century. The name comes from the derogatory term, in Roman dialect applied to some poor shepherds because of their footwear, called in Roman dialect ciocie. These shoes, which were widespread among the poorest shepherds of much of Southern and Southeast Europe, were subsequently used in the province of Frosinone only by folklore groups and for touristic initiatives.

== Geography and historical names ==
Until the Fascist era, there were no official publications that imposed the term on the territories of the current province of Frosinone, the term, however rare, was used during the nineteenth century in a rather varied way with respect to geographical areas. In 1861, Franco Mistrali applied the term for example to the brigands of Sabina and not of Lazio. The correct geographic term for the northern area of the province of Frosinone is Valle del Sacco (or Middle Valle Latina (Latin Valley)). The area inhabited by the Hernici was known in Latin as ager Hernicus.

== Literature and clichés ==
Except for the fascist propaganda of the time, most scholars believe that the toponym Ciociaria was originally widespread only in Roman popular culture and among the intellectuals who disseminated its traditions, and therefore insignificant outside the borders of the Papal State: the term does not appear in any document of the Kingdom of Naples or the Two Sicilies to indicate the Liri Valley or the territory of Fondi, nor is the adjective ciociaro used to designate a population or a culture in the Neapolitan state. From the second post-war period, the realist and neorealist literary topos, the search for a common Christian Democratic political identity in southern Lazio and in part the suppression of the ecclesiastical province of Capua with the annexation of the dioceses of Monte Cassino, Aquino and Atina to the Roman ecclesiastical province, were the cultural factors that favored, in the common opinion, the spread of that point of view according to which this undefined and non-geographic term to the south reaches the Garigliano (including according to some even the Lazio coast).

== Folklore and handicraft ==
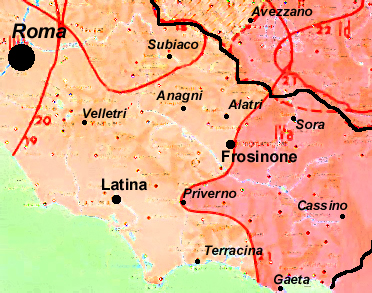
Linguistic map of Southern Lazio: Central Italian in pink and Southern Italian (Neapolitan language) in magenta.

On the basis of the above, various local institutions periodically organize various folkloristic events that recall the aforementioned clichés with respect to the clothing, religious initiatives and traditions of the territories of the valle del Sacco, considering them as manifestations of a "ciociaria tradition". These events include food fairs and music festivals, processions, performances of bands, palios and tournaments among the town's quarters. Even the local artisanal production, which has historical roots in the much older craftsmanship of Lazio, Campania and Abruzzo is often improperly associated by tourist organizations, promotional events or the press as part of this "ciociara tradition".

Among the best known objects in the artisanal production of the areas south east of Rome that are arbitrarily associated to this recent term there are copper amphoras (called "conca"); wicker and "vinchio" (marshy grass that grows on the slopes of the Aurunci Mounts) woven in the shape of baskets; terracotta amphorae, called "cannate", terracotta jugs made in Aquino and Fiuggi; gold and coral jewellery produced in Alatri, Anagni, Fiuggi, Veroli; works in copper and wrought iron; embroideries, like the embroidered towels and tablecloths of Veroli and Boville Ernica and the religious vestments produced in Anagni.

== Rapes after the battle of Monte Cassino ==
The day following the Battle of Monte Cassino, Goumiers rampaged through the surrounding countryside committing mass rape in Southern Lazio. Victims of such crimes became known in Italy as marocchinate, literally translatable as "Moroccaned". Alberto Moravia wrote the novel La ciociara on the event, which was made into a successful 1960 movie directed by Vittorio de Sica starring Sophia Loren and a 2015 opera by Marco Tutino. This further contributed to the spread of the term that is indeed often associated with these war crimes.

== See also ==
- Ciociaria in cinematography
