= The Conformist =

The Conformist may refer to:

- The Conformist (novel), 1951 novel by Alberto Moravia
  - The Conformist (1970 film), a film adaptation of the above
- The Conformist (2017 film), a Chinese drama film
