= The Time of Indifference =

2020 Italian drama film

- Italian: Gli indifferenti
- Directed by: Leonardo Guerra Seràgnoli
- Screenplay by: Leonardo Guerra Seràgnoli; Alessandro Valenti
- Based on: The Time of Indifference by Alberto Moravia
- Produced by: Fabrizio Donvito; Daniel Campos Pavoncelli; Benedetto Habib; Marco Cohen; Ines Vasiljevic; Nicola Lusuardi
- Starring: Valeria Bruni Tedeschi; Edoardo Pesce; Vincenzo Crea; Beatrice Grannò; Giovanna Mezzogiorno
- Cinematography: Gian Filippo Corticelli
- Edited by: Carlotta Cristiani; Giogiò Franchini
- Music by: Matteo Franceschini
- Distributed by: Vision Distribution
- Release date: 24 November 2020 (Italy)
- Running time: 81 minutes
- Country: Italy
- Language: Italian

The Time of Indifference (Italian: Gli indifferenti) is a 2020 Italian drama film directed by Leonardo Guerra Seràgnoli.

The film is an adaptation of the 1929 novel of the same name by Alberto Moravia. It was released in Italy on 24 November 2020.

== Cast ==
- Valeria Bruni Tedeschi as Maria Grazia Ardengo
- Edoardo Pesce as Leo Merumeci
- Vincenzo Crea as Michele Ardengo
- Beatrice Grannò as Carla Ardengo
- Giovanna Mezzogiorno as Lisa
- Awa Ly as Marame
- Blu Yoshimi as Lavinia
- Denise Tantucci as Carla's friend
- Giovanni Anzaldo as Leo's friend
- Pilar Fogliati as a guest
