= Miquel Llor =

Miquel Llor i Forcada
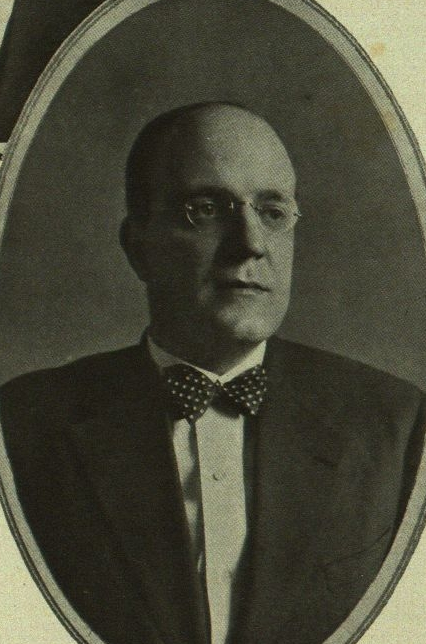
- Miquel Llor i Forcada
- Born: Miquel Llor i Forcada; 1894; Barcelona
- Died: 1966 (aged 71–72)
- Occupations: Author and translator
- Years active: XXth century
- Notable work: Laura a la ciutat dels sants

Miquel Llor i Forcada (Barcelona, May 3, 1894 - May 2, 1966) was a Catalan author, narrator and novelist. He also wrote in the press, mainly in Mirador. He worked as a translator of Italian and French (translating works by Alberto Moravia and André Gide, among others). He was a Catalan short story writer and novelist active during the period before the Spanish Civil War. In his prose he highlights the influence of European writers such as Proust, Freud, Dostoevsky and James Joyce. His most important work is Laura a la ciutat dels sants (lit. Laura in the city of saints), which received the 1930 Joan Crexells prize. He worked for many years as a Catalan copy editor for the Culture Department of the Barcelona City Council.

== Works ==
=== Novel ===
- Història grisa, 1925
- Tàntal, 1928
- Laura a la ciutat dels sants, 1931
- L'endemà del dolor, 1937
- El somriure dels sants, 1947
- Jocs d'infants, 1950
- Un camí de Damasc, 1959

=== Short stories ===
- "L'Endemà del dolor", 1930.
- "L'oreig al desert", 1934.
- "L'esguard al mirall", 1934
- "Cinc contes", 1935
- "Tots els contes: 1925–1950", 1952
- "Viatge a qui sap on i altres narracions", 1977

=== Essay ===
- "El premi a la virtut o un idil·li a la plaça de Sant Just", 1935

=== Poetry ===
- "L'ofrena", presented at Jocs Florals de Barcelona in 1927
