= Roman Tales (film) =

- Directed by: Gianni Franciolini
- Written by: Sergio Amidei; Age & Scarpelli; Alberto Moravia; Francesco Rosi
- Story by: Alberto Moravia (tales)
- Produced by: Niccolò Theodoli
- Starring: Maurizio Arena; Franco Fabrizi; Totò; Vittorio De Sica; Silvana Pampanini
- Cinematography: Mario Montuori
- Edited by: Adriana Novelli
- Music by: Mario Nascimbene
- Distributed by: Daria Cinematografica
- Release date: 1955
- Running time: 95 minutes
- Country: Italy
- Language: Italian

Roman Tales (Italian: Racconti romani) is a 1955 Italian comedy film directed by Gianni Franciolini. It is based on several short stories collected in Racconti romani by Alberto Moravia. The film won two David di Donatello Awards, for best director and best producer.

== Plot ==
In Rome, during the Fifties, three boys attempt to commit a robbery. They're Mario, Alvaro and Otello, aided by a trickster, Professor Semprini, who claims to be a great intellectual. In reality the man is just the garbage boy of the upright lawyer Mazzoni Baralla, who goes on the trail of the three boys as soon as they attempt the shot. Indeed, Alvaro, Mario and Otello are arrested, after being deceived by Semprini, who demands from them a payment for the design of the plan. In fact the three first attempt to pass off counterfeit notes, then pretend to be guards from the vice squad in Villa Borghese. After the arrest and acquittal, the three decide to return to their old and simple jobs.

== Cast ==
- Totò: Professor Semprini
- Vittorio De Sica: Lawyer Mazzoni Baralla
- Silvana Pampanini: Maria
- Franco Fabrizi: Alvaro
- Antonio Cifariello: Otello
- Giancarlo Costa: Spartaco
- Maurizio Arena: Mario
- Sergio Raimondi: Valerio Zerboni
- Nando Bruno: Amilcare
- Mario Riva: The Waiter
- Mario Carotenuto: The "Commendatore"
- Eloisa Cianni: Iris
- Giovanna Ralli: Marcella
- Maria Pia Casilio: Annita
- Anita Durante: Alvaro's Mother
- Turi Pandolfini: Client of the Barber
- Aldo Giuffrè: Lawyer
