= Too Bad She's Bad =

1954 Italian comedy film

- Directed by: Alessandro Blasetti
- Written by: Suso Cecchi d'Amico; Alessandro Continenza; Ennio Flaiano
- Starring: Marcello Mastroianni; Sophia Loren; Vittorio De Sica
- Cinematography: Aldo Giordani
- Edited by: Mario Serandrei
- Music by: Alessandro Cicognini
- Production company: Documento Film
- Distributed by: CEI Incom
- Release dates: 25 January 1955 (Italy); 24 December 1955 (U.S.)
- Running time: 95 minutes
- Country: Italy
- Language: Italian

Too Bad She's Bad (Italian: Peccato che sia una canaglia) is a 1955 Italian comedy directed by Alessandro Blasetti. It stars Sophia Loren and is based on Alberto Moravia's story "Fanatico", from his Racconti Romani.

It was shot at the Cinecittà Studios and on location around Rome. The film's sets were designed by the art directors Mario Chiari and Mario Garbuglia.

== Plot ==
Young and shapely Lina Stroppiani and her two accomplices try to con a taxi driver out of his cab and money, with unexpected results when he discovers what they are up to.

== Cast ==
- Vittorio De Sica as "Professor" Vittorio Stroppiani
- Sophia Loren as Lina Stroppiani, the "professor's" daughter
- Marcello Mastroianni as Paolo Silvestrelli, a taxi driver
- Marcella Melnati as Lina's grandmother, the "professor's" mother
- Giorgio Sanna as Peppino
- Michael Simone as Toto
- Umberto Melnati as Robbery victim
- Margherita Bagni as Elsa, Umberto's wife
- Mario Scaccia as Robbery victim
- Wanda Benedetti as Valeria, Mario's wife
- Walter Bartoletti as Brunetto
- Mario Passante as Commissioner
- Memmo Carotenuto as Cesare, a taxi driver
- Giacomo Furia as Luigi, a taxi driver
- Lina Furia as Luigi's wife
- Vittorio Braschi as Fence
- Manlio Busoni as Journalist
- Giulio Calì as Night watchman
- John Stacy as English tourist
- Maria Britneva as Tourist's wife
- Giulio Paradisi as Server in bar
- Marga Cella as Bar owner
- Pietro Carloni as Intriguing gentleman
- Amalia Pellegrini as Old woman at station
- Mauro Sacripanti as Peppino
- Pasquale Cennamo as Sergeant
- Franco Fantasia as Radiologist
- Nino Dal Fabbro as dishonest car mechanic
