= Gli indifferenti =

1929 novel by Alberto Moravia

- First US edition
- Author: Alberto Moravia
- Translator: Aida Mastrangelo
- Language: Italian
- Publisher: E. P. Dutton and Co. (US)
- Publication date: 1929
- Publication place: Italy
- English publication date: 1932 (as The Indifferent Ones)

Gli Indifferenti (The Time of Indifference, also translated as The Indifferent Ones) is a novel by Alberto Moravia, published in 1929.

== Background ==
After a meeting with friends at which it was agreed that each should produce a novel, the young Moravia began writing the story that would become Gli Indifferenti. Moravia sent the manuscript to the editor of 900, a bilingual (Italian-French) review with which he had previously published some short stories. It was dismissed as a "mist of words". He spent two and a half years writing the novel. It was published with a ₤5,000 contribution from Moravia's father, Carlo Pincherle, as the Milanese publisher Alpes was unwilling to take a risk on an unknown author.

== Plot synopsis ==
Gli Indifferenti is a psychological portrayal of the life of a middle-class mother and her two children. The action of the novel takes place largely over two days. Leo, the wealthy lover of Mariagrazia, a middle-class widow, begins an affair with her daughter, Carla. Carla decides that she will sleep with Leo the following day (her twenty-fourth birthday) in order "to begin a new life".

== Reception ==
The first edition sold out within a number of weeks. An English translation of the novel was published in United States in 1935 under the title The Indifferent Ones. Another English translation was published in Great Britain in 1953 under the title The Time of Indifference.

== Film versions ==
- Time of Indifference (Gli indifferenti), 1964 film directed by Francesco Maselli
- A Time of Indifference (Gli indifferenti), 1987 television miniseries directed by Mauro Bolognini
- The Time of Indifference (Gli indifferenti), 2020 film directed by Leonardo Guerra Seràgnoli

== See also ==
- 1929 in literature
- Lists of books
