= Pond Granieri =

Artificial lake in the province of Rome

- Interactive map of Pond Granieri
- Location: Nettuno, Metropolitan City of Rome Capital, Lazio, Italy
- Coordinates: 41°28′09″N 12°42′01″E
- Type: Artificial

The Pond Granieri is an artificial lake located in the province of Rome in the area that lies within the Foglino forest in Nettuno.

It has an elongated shape and is a natural oasis where various species of animals and plants can be seen. Sport fishing competitions and general sporting events are also held there.

== Flora ==
The flora of the lake consists of tree plants that can reach heights of up to 20–30 meters. These include turkey oaks (Quercus cerris), English oak (Quercus frainetto), some specimens of oak (Quercus Robur), downy oak (Quercus pubescens), and field maple (Acer campestre).

In the forest wetlands, the tree layer is characterized by black or common alder (Alnus glutinosa), southern ash (Fraxinus oxycarpa), and white hornbeam (Carpinus betulus). Among shrubs, the Pond is characterized by the presence of common hawthorn (Crataegus monogyna), almond pear (Pirus amygdaliformis), wild pear (Pyrus pyraster), wild apple (Malus sylvestris), common medlar (Mespilus germanica), privet (Ligustrum vulgare).

The undergrowth is rich in common myrtle (Myrtus communis), dog rose (Rosa canina), brambleberry (Rubus ulmifolius), bishop's cap (Euonymus europaeus), pamper juniper (Juniperus oxycedrus), broom heather (Erica scoparia), tree heather (Erica arborea), and mastic tree (Pistacia lentiscus). Granieri Pond on the north side In wetter areas, on the other hand, you can find water fennel (Oenanthe pimpinelloides), cycutaria (Oenanthe aquatica), phragmites (Phragmites australis), yellow iris (Iris pseudacorus) some species of rushes.

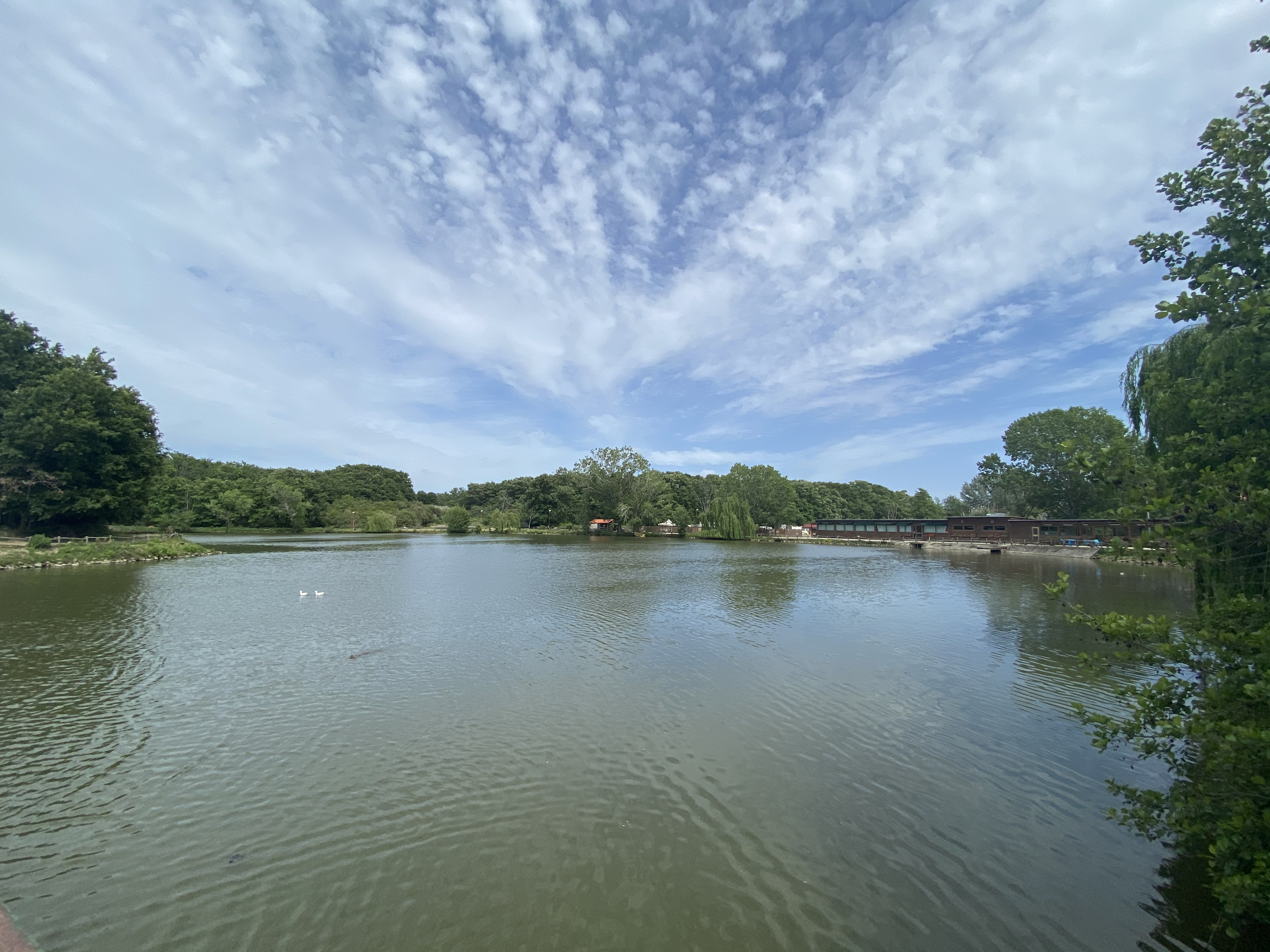
View of the entrance of the Pond.

== Fauna ==
On the other hand, as far as the animal population is concerned, we can find within the waters several fish species including carp, carassi, catfish, koi carp, and trout perch. Over the years, some native species such as gambusia, sun perch, and eel have also been introduced.

Within the entire natural area can be found:

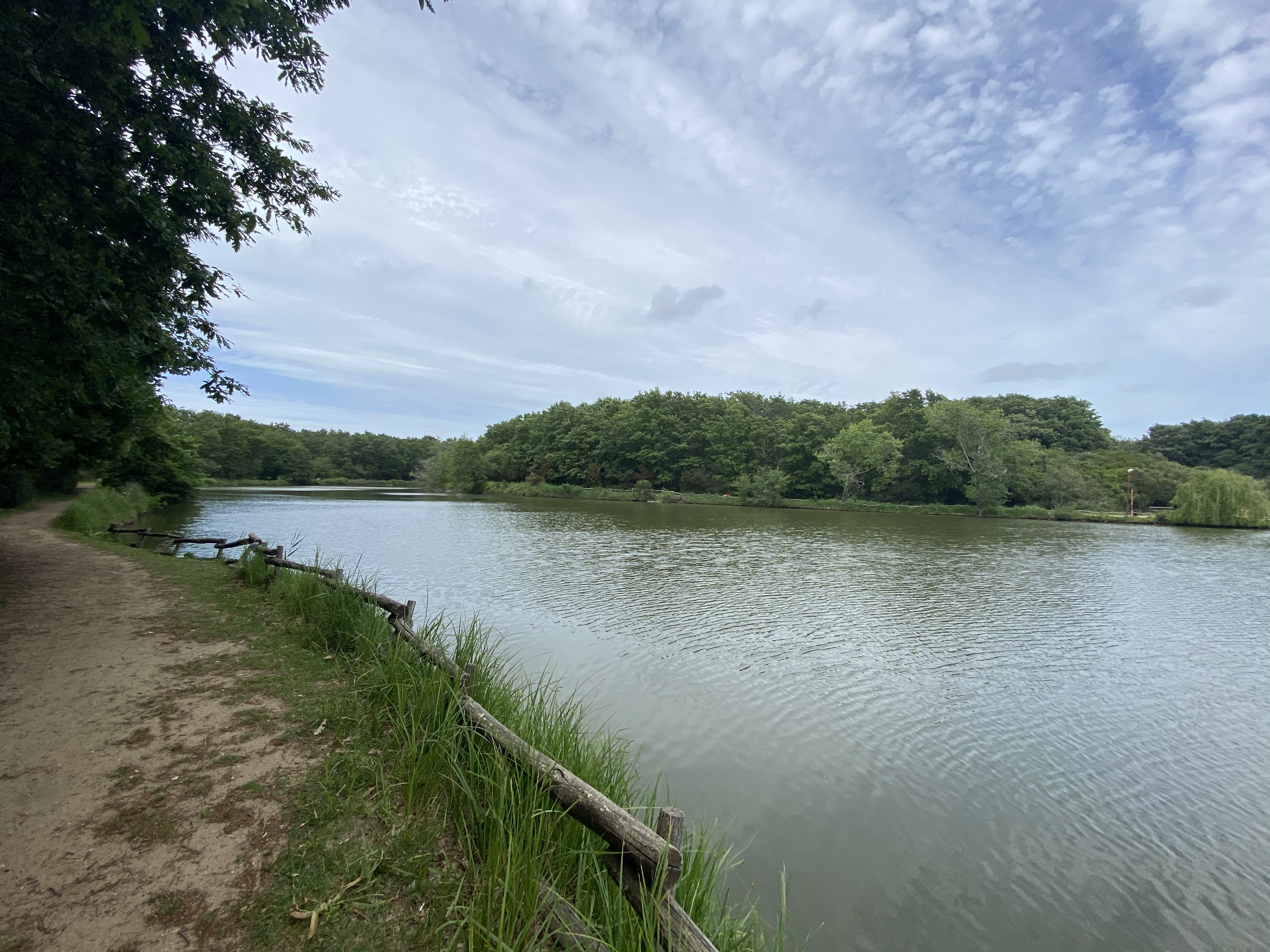
Pond Granieri on the north side

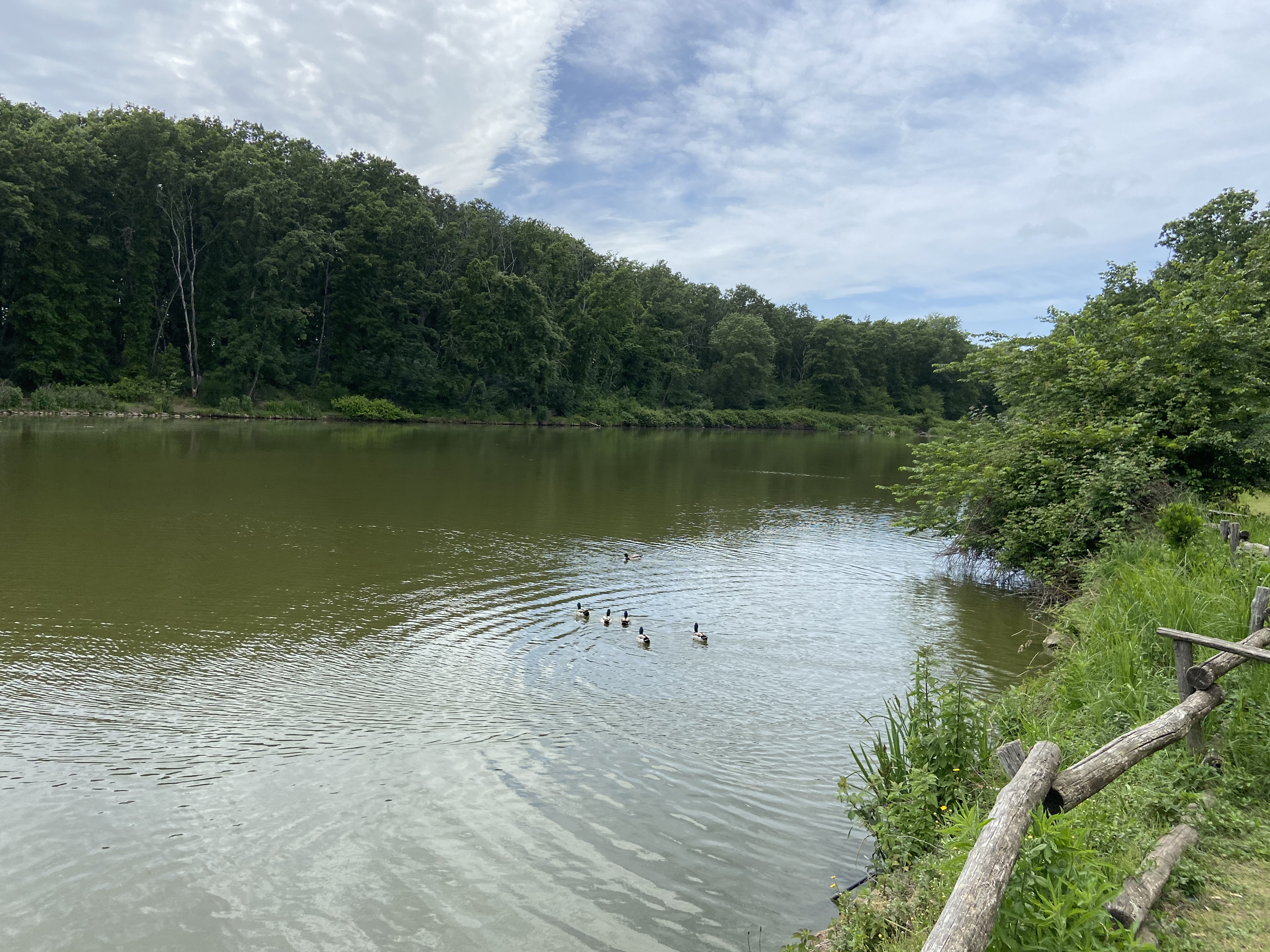
View of the west side of Pond Granieri.

- Some species of Amphibians include the crested newt (Triturus cristatus), green frog, agile frog (Rana dalmatina), tree frog (Hyla arborea), and common toad (Bufo bufo).
- Some Reptile species including the collared grass snake (Natrix natrix), green lizard (Lacerta viridis), common viper (Vipera aspis), grass snake, wall lizard (Podarcis muralis), and field lizard (Podarcis sicula).
- Bird species include numerous species of both breeding and passage birds including the little egret (Egretta garzetta), grey heron (Ardea cinerea), purple heron (Ardea purpurea), mallard (Anas platyrhynchos), the garganey (Anas querquedula), the kestrel, the moorhen (Gallinula chloropus), the coot (Fulica atra), the snipe (Gallinago gallinago), the woodcock (Scolopax rusticola), and the wryneck (Jynx torquilla).
