= Conjugal Love (novel) =

1949 novel by Alberto Moravia

First US edition - 1951 (publ. Farrar, Straus and Young)

Conjugal Love was written in Italian (L'amore conjugale), by Alberto Moravia in 1947. It was translated into English by Angus Davidson in 1951 and by Marina Harss and published by Other Press in 2007.

The novel is written in the first person by a rich Italian dilettante who has gone with his wife to the countryside to attempt to write a novel. The situation is complicated, however, by the couple's decision to remain abstinent throughout this period, and the wife's accusation that her husband's barber has tried to molest her.
