= Ciocia =

Traditional Italian footwear

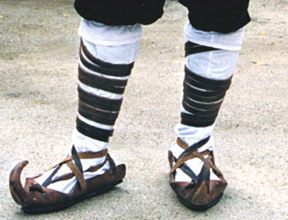
Man wearing ciocie

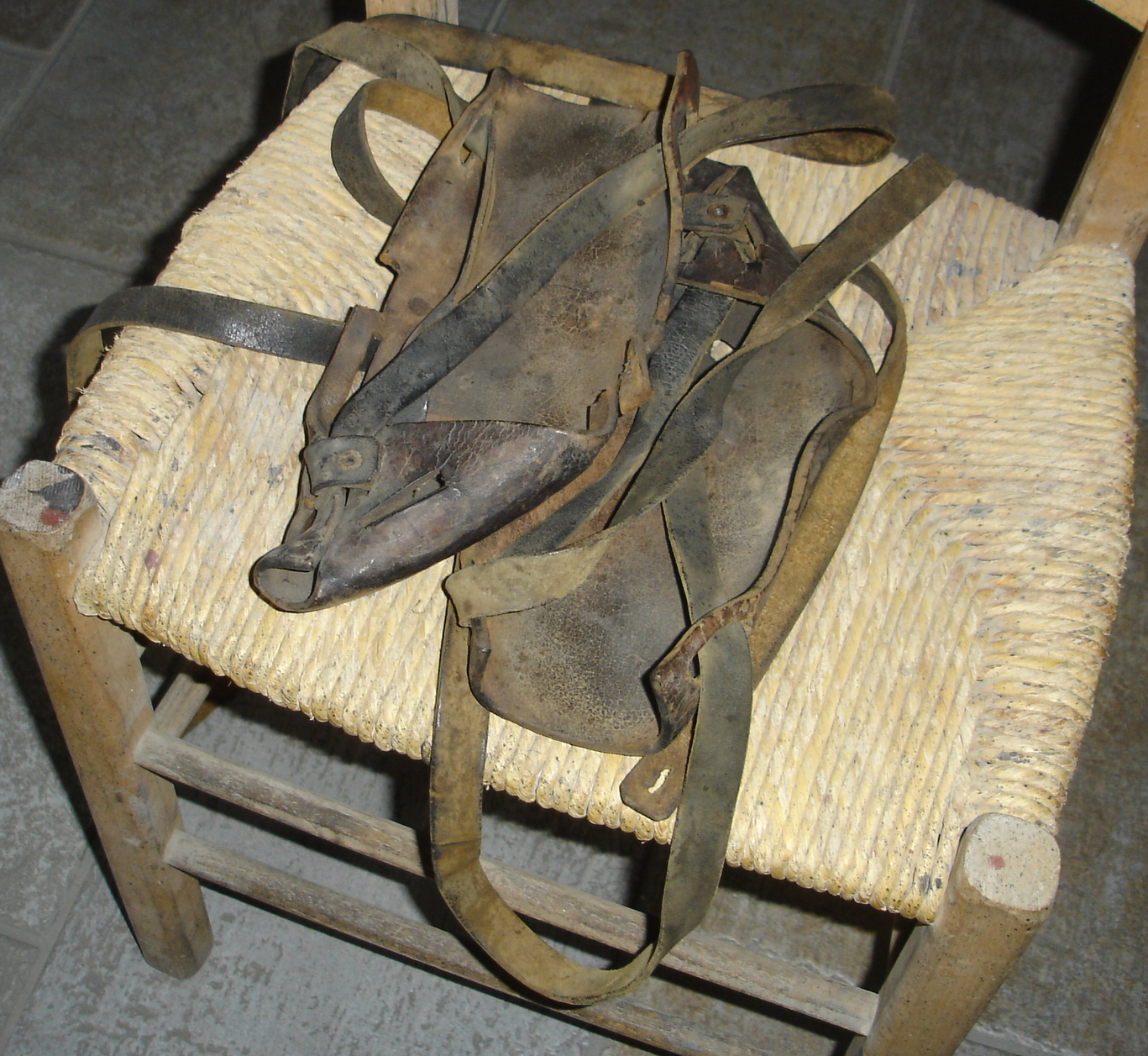
A pair of ciocie

Ciocia (pl. ciocie) is a kind of Italian footwear, now typically associated with the rural population of mountainous areas of Italy and the western Balkans. The traditional form of ciocie are made with large leather soles, tied to the leg by straps (strenghe or curiole) bound between the ankle and the knee. Rather than socks, a large piece of loose cloth (pezza, pl. pezze) was placed around the feet, ankles, and calves under the ciocie.

== Names ==
Ciocia is the name for the footwear used in Rome and northern Lazio, where it is pronounced [ˈtʃɔːʃa]. In Marche and Abruzzo, the same footwear is called chioca, pronounced [ˈkjɔːka]; in Abruzzo, it is also known as chiochiera ([ˈkjɔːkjərə]); around Minturno, ciòcero ([ˈtʃɔːʃərə]); in Campania, sciòscio ([ˈʃɔʃʃə]); and in southern Lazio, Colli Albani, and the Mezzogiorno generally, zampitto ([dzamˈpittə]). Most of these names probably derive from the Latin soccus, a kind of ancient Anatolian slipper popularized as part of the typical costume in Ancient Greek comedy. The form worn in the western Balkans is known as opanci.

== History ==
Under the early Roman Empire, socci were considered effeminate but their use became widespread before the reign of Diocletian. The long pointed toe may represent the legacy of the Etruscan calceus repandus or a continuation of the medieval pigache or poulaine trends. Combined with long straps binding the shoe to the leg, the ciocia became so common among poor peasants and shepherds in central and southern Italy that it gave rise to the term ciociari ("ciocia-wearers"), used in Central Italian dialects to mean poor country folk or bumpkins. Although this is now a pejorative term, 19th-century Romantic painters and poets celebrated the ciocie and the peasants' typically colorful cloths. Similar footwear is common in the countryside of Kosovo and Northern Macedonia.

== See also ==
- List of shoe styles
- Ciociaria
- Central and Southern Italian
- Other pointed shoes
