= Roman Tales =

Series of short stories by Alberto Moravia

- First edition
- Author: Alberto Moravia
- Original title: Racconti romani
- Language: Italian
- Publisher: Bompiani
- Publication date: 1954
- Publication place: Italy
- Media type: Print
- Pages: 2193
- ISBN: 88-452-3299-9
- OCLC: 179696254
- Dewey Decimal: 853/.912 22
- LC Class: PQ4829.O62 A6 2000

Roman Tales (Italian: Racconti romani) is a series of sixty-one short stories written by the Italian author, Alberto Moravia. Written and published initially in the Italian newspaper, Il Corriere della Sera, they were published as a collection in 1954 by Bompiani. All of the stories are set in Rome or its surroundings after World War II and focus on 'the common people of Rome' (Roma popolana). The characters in these stories tend to be the unemployed, ex-convicts, waiters, drivers, con artists, thieves and petty criminals, the average man (or woman) and the lower classes aspiring to climb out of poverty.

All the stories are told in the first person with the narrator often unnamed, although details are usually furnished to provide a clue to the narrator's identity, such as their occupation, motivations and social status. Roman Tales provide a snapshot on life in Rome after World War II, revealing much about the inhabitants of Rome in the early 1950s.

== Titles of the short stories ==
Below is a list of the names of the short stories that comprise the Roman Tales. Their order is the same presented in volume 3, tome 1 of Alberto Moravia's, Opere (ISBN 8845244148), a multi-volume set containing all of Moravia's writings published by Bompiani in 2000:

- Fanatico (The Fanatic)
- Arrivederci
- Pioggia di maggio (Rain in May)
- Non approfondire (Don't Delve Too Deeply . . .)
- La bella serata
- Scherzi del caldo (Hot Weather Jokes)
- La controfigura
- Il pagliaccio (The Clown)
- Il biglietto falso
- Il camionista (The Lorry-Driver)
- Il pensatore
- Scorfani
- Il mediatore (The Go-Between)
- Il pupo (The Baby)
- Il delitto perfetto (The Perfect Crime)
- Il picche nicche
- La voglia di vino
- Prepotente per forza
- Sciupone
- La giornata nera
- I gioielli (Jewellery)
- Tabù (Taboo)
- Io non dico di no (I Don't say no . . .)
- L'inconsciente
- Il provino
- Il pignolo
- La ciociara (The Girl from Ciociaria)
- Impataccato
- Scherzi di ferragosto
- Il terrore di Roma (The Terror of Rome)
- L'amicizia (Friendship)
- La rovina dell'umanità (The Ruin of Humanity)
- Perdipiede
- Vecchio stupido (Silly Old Fool)
- Caterina
- La parola mamma
- Gli occhiali (A Pair of Spectacles)
- Il cane cinese
- Mario (Mario)
- Gli amici senza soldi
- Bu bu bu
- Ladri in chiesa
- Precisamente a te
- Faccia di mascalzone
- Un uomo sfortunato
- Tirato a sorte
- Pigliati un brodo
- La vita in campagna
- Le sue giornate
- La gita
- La rivincita di Tarzan
- Romolo e Remo (Romulus and Remus)
- Faccia da norcino
- L'appetito (Appetite)
- L'infermiera (The Nurse)
- Il tesoro (The Treasure)
- La concorrenza
- Bassetto
- Il guardiano (The Caretaker)
- Il naso (The Nose)
- Il godipoco

== In translation ==
A handful of Moravia's Racconti romani were published in an English translation, entitled Roman Tales, in 1957 by Farrar, Straus and Cudahy. Unfortunately, this collection of translated stories is no longer in print but can be found in dozens of libraries worldwide or on the used book market.

== In print ==
Roman Tales is still in print in Italian and are available from Bompiani as part of the mult-volume set, Opere (ISBN 8845244148), published in 2000. The stories themselves were republished in 2001 from Bompiani, entitled Racconti romani (ISBN 8845248976). Both editions are currently in print.

== Radio broadcasts ==
Ten of the Roman Tales were converted into radio broadcasts by RAI television in 1959 (see link below to Romolo e Remo). With the advent of audiobooks, several Italian publishing entities have released audiobooks of these short stories.

- Pioggia di Maggio
- Romolo e Remo

== Film adaptations ==
Roman Tales has been adapted into film three times. The first, in 1954, in the film Too Bad She's Bad directed by Alessandro Blasetti with Sophia Loren and Marcello Mastroianni, adapting the story, Fanatico. Moravia's stories were used again in 1955 under director Gianni Franciolini starring Totò, Vittorio De Sica, and Giovanna Ralli, entitled Roman Tales. A third film, From a Roman Balcony, filmed in 1960 and directed by Mauro Bolognini, also borrowed from Moravia's stories.

== Criticism and interpretation ==
Below is a list of invaluable sources about Moravia's Roman Tales—all are in Italian unless otherwise noted:

- Camilucci, Marcello. "Roma e i "Racconti romani" di Moravia", Studi romani, 6:5 (1958:sett./ott.) p. 547-561
- Lauta, Gianluca. La scrittura di Moravia: lingua e stile dagli Indifferenti ai Racconti romani. Comunicazione e scienze umane, 1. Milano: F. Angeli, 2005.
- Moravia, Alberto, and Piero Cudini. Racconti romani. Tascabili Bompiani. Milano: Bompiani, 2005. (especially introduction by Piero Cudini)
- Moravia, Alberto, Rocco Capozzi, and Mario B. Mignone. Homage to Moravia. Filibrary Series, no. 5. Stony Brook, NY: Forum Italicum, 1993.
