= Two Women (novel) =

1957 novel by Alberto Moravia

Two women
- First edition
- Author: Alberto Moravia
- Original title: La Ciociara
- Translator: A. Davidson
- Cover artist: Pierre-Auguste Renoir, The Braid, 1887
- Language: Italian
- Genre: War novel
- Publisher: Bompiani
- Publication date: 1957
- Publication place: Italy
- Media type: Print (Hardback & Paperback)
- Pages: 414

Two Women (original title in Italian: La Ciociara) is a 1957 Italian-language novel by Alberto Moravia. It tells the story of a woman trying to protect her teenaged daughter from the horrors of war. When both are attacked and the virgin daughter raped by North African colonial soldiers the daughter suffers PTSD.

The 1960 film adaptation starred Sophia Loren and earned her the Academy Award.

== Plot summary ==
A daughter and her mother fight to survive in Rome during the Second World War. Cesira, a widowed Roman shopkeeper, and Rosetta, a naive teenager of beauty and devout faith.

When the German army prepares to enter Rome, Cesira packs a few provisions, sews her life savings into the seams of her dress, and flees south with Rosetta to her native province of Ciociaria, a poor, mountainous region famous for providing the domestic servants of Rome.

For nine months the two women endure hunger, cold, and filth as they await the arrival of the Allied forces. But the liberation, when it comes, brings unexpected tragedy.

On their way home, the pair are attacked and Rosetta brutally raped by a group of Goumiers (Moroccan allied soldiers serving in the French Army), apparently part of Marocchinate. This act of violence so embitters Rosetta that she falls numbly into a life of prostitution.

In his story of two women, Moravia offers up an intimate portrayal of the anguish and destruction wrought by war, as devastating behind the lines as it is on the battlefield.

Their lives are torn apart due to the devastating war. Bomb explosions are routine. They are left with nothing to eat, but a mother wants to make her daughter feel comfortable, and wants to protect her daughter as with an iron shield. She wants to protect her against bomb explosions, starvation and men's hunger for sex. In one of the many explosions, their house, shop and everything gets destroyed. Cesira goes to see a coal businessman. The businessman is married, but still Cesira becomes attracted toward him and the two fall for each other. But when Cesira was returning, the businessman follows her, which decent Cesira doesn't like. She believes and she says that she isn't anyone's possession, that she is a self-respected and independent lady. She couldn't find any safe shelter in the city and so she decides to stay in her village until the war ends. She sets out for her village, but when she reaches there, she finds that food is scarce in the village, too. The villagers are dependent upon bread and wine, which is accessible only with difficulty. The mother-daughter duo moves on with a number of difficulties.

== Characters in Two Women ==
- Cesira – a widowed shopkeeper from Rome
- Rosetta – her teenage daughter

== Adaptations ==
A 1960 film adaptation was directed by Vittorio De Sica, from a screenplay by Cesare Zavattini and De Sica, starring Sophia Loren, Jean-Paul Belmondo, Eleonora Brown, Carlo Ninchi, and Andrea Checchi. Loren's critically acclaimed performance earned her the Academy Award for Best Actress, the first winner for a non-English language film.

La Ciociara was remade for television in 1988, adapted by Diana Gould, Lidia Ravera, Dino Risi and Bernardino Zapponi. It was directed by Risi and starred Loren, Robert Loggia, Leonardo Ferrantini, Dario Ghirardi, and Sydney Penny.

San Francisco Opera commissioned an operatic treatment of La Ciociara, with music and libretto by Italian composer Marco Tutino and additional contributions to the libretto by Luca Rossi. Italian mezzo-soprano Anna Caterina Antonacci headlined the cast as Cesira, with American artists soprano Sarah Shafer as Rosetta, tenor Dimitri Pittas as Michele, and baritone Mark Delavan as Giovanni. The opera received its world premiere on June 13, 2015.
