= 1934 (novel) =

1982 novel by Alberto Moravia

- Author: Alberto Moravia
- Translator: William Weaver
- Published: Bompiani (1982, Italian); Farrar, Straus and Giroux (1999, English)
- Media type: print
- Pages: 297
- ISBN: 0374526524

1934 is a novel by Italian author Alberto Moravia, first published in 1982. It is a political tale about an Italian anti-Fascist and the encounter he has with a German girl.

== Synopsis ==
The story takes place in 1934 on a boat ride to Capri. It details the relationship between an Italian anti-Fascist—Lucio—and a scared, suicidal German girl. It addresses large philosophical questions like the meaning of life, and love and death, through the author's art.

== Acclaim for the book ==
- According to New York Review of Books, Stephen Spender, the book is "one of the most brilliant strokes in this novel about relations in the Thirties between Italians and Germans is that Moravia never reveals whether his Italian narrator and hero is serious or not, and doubt about the seriousness lies in his being Italian. ... This is the truth of the book: that within the external situation of the Italian Fascist--German Nazi relationship it is impossible to accept as authentic virtually anything people do."
- "In his seventy-fifth year, the novelist here confronts the experience of the Italians who were not Fascists, trapped in the current of their historical moment. This is a timely novel, then, for it is in the tradition of retrospective dissection of the Fascist experience that has been so evident in the past decade, both in literature and in the Italian and German cinema." e-Notes.

== See also ==
- List of works by Alberto Moravia
