= Laura a la ciutat dels sants =

1931 novel by Miquel Llor

- Author: Miquel Llor
- Language: Catalan
- Publication date: 1931
- Publication place: Spain

Laura a la ciutat dels sants (literally: Laura in the City of Saints) is a 1931 novel written by the Catalan writer Miquel Llor. The work is rooted in realism and modernism, but it also has features of the 1930s, more influenced by Freud and other modern authors. Set in Vic, it follows the initial journey of Laura and her development as a person. The negative image of rural and catholic towns caused a controversy that made Llor write the second part, El somriure dels sants (1947), which clarified this pessimistic portrait.

== Argument ==
Laura, the female main character from Barcelona, gets to know Tomàs Muntanyola at a party, a rural owner from Comarquinal (a Vic-inspired city), and three months later they marry, and they move into the paternal home of Tomàs, where Laura starts to experiment a strong oppression, caused by the fog around the zone and the contempt from Teresa (Tomàs's sister). Neither does she feel good with Tomàs, a cold man who is only worried about economic affairs and ostentation. Although she is decided to change him, she discovers that it's not possible in little time, and that she doesn't love that man she believed to be in love with any more; actually, though, they never loved each other, the only feelings there existed were having and being able to show off one of the prettiest girls out of all Comarquinal (by Tomàs), and being something for the first time in her life (by Laura). Laura begins to be left out by her husband, and seen by bad eyes by the neighbours of Comarquinal, who have the same way of thinking as Tomàs —neighbours who are outraged, for example, by the mere fact of Laura being dressed with dresses that showed a half of her legs.

Laura seems condemned to this environment that oppresses her until a daughter of hers dies. Since then, she meets Pere Gifreda, a 27-year-old lawyer, whom Teresa had always been secretly in love with and who, as Laura, believes there's too much hypocrisy in Comarquinal. This shared belief causes Laura to not feel so alone, and that's why she ends up falling in love with Pere. When Teresa discovers the affair between Laura and Pere —adultery that never happens, even though it is desired—, she preaches it to all the town, so Laura is sent to rest in les Aulines, a totally uncommunicated place, so that this relationship that could stain the family's good name was avoided. Teresa's pretext is that Laura has to recover from her "illness": the isolation from the rest of the town, but in reality, though, she acts moved by jealousy, because Teresa had been in love with Pere since she was younger, and the fact is that she still is; Tomàs, who isn't aware of Laura's and Pere's relationship, accepts it. In les Aulines, Laura intensifies her isolation from everyone, and only thinks about an idealized Pere, whom it's worth to suffer all that marginalization for.

When, after a time, she comes back to Comarquinal, the rumours about Laura and Pere explode and Tomàs ends up knowing them. At the same time, Laura, when she sees Pere again, realizes that she'd never really loved Pere, but what existed between them was only a feeling of companionship, of sheltering, and that that idealized Pere from les Aulines was just a product of her imagination. When she tries to search for help at uncle Llibori's house, he tries to rape her; then, Laura tries to get back with his husband, but she is not allowed. Pere tries to take her in, but she rejects him because, at the end, she sees, in Pere, the same thing she saw in uncle Llibori and his husband: a wild desire of possessing her. She ends up coming back to Barcelona and, later on, she finds shelter in a convent in the south of France with hopes of finding someday a place to meditate and be calm, away from any rumour.

== Characters ==
- Laura: a self-made character, self-taught, who isn't able to surpass the events that surround her until the end, when she leaves. She's a naïve, delicate and pretty woman. She's an unsatisfied character who doesn't find her place in his husband's town, even though she tries to adapt. The impossibility of adapting to an environment so locked up because of her nature is what produces her anxiety and a great dissatisfaction.
- Tomàs: a rich, uncultured and coarse farmer, but also a coward. He is upheld in the ignorance of the rumours about his wife and when they arrive to him, he doesn't dare to at until the end.
- Teresa: a very dark character with a great internal conflict. She is the unmarried Tomas's sister, and when he marries, she feels left out. Outside, she acts following the established canons, but there's a whole world of repression, dissatisfaction, and weakness inside. There are two moments in which she seems to get close to Laura: when she organizes a get-together at home and when she has to share her love, Pere, maintained in secret for decades. The jealousy and fear towards sin makes her an unhappy being, and that shame causes her to not be seen as a totally bad antagonist by the reader.
- Pere: represents the archetype of the seductive young man. The passion he feels for Laura has three phases: firstly, he adores her and tells to himself that he only feels mercy for the girl, secondly, he recognises himself to have fallen in love, but doesn't dare to go any further, and thirdly, after months of awayness, he grants a privilege to the carnal part.
- Llibori: the family's uncle, represents the bourgeoisie in the city. His heir marries a poor girl and he loses the family respect, and his daughter dies in the first pregnancy. He feigns seriousness and scandal for Laura's behaviour, but ultimately he's possessed by passion, that's why he tries to make her his own when he sees that the girl tries to look for refuge in his house at the end of the novel.
- Beatriu: niece who lives in uncle Llibori's house, the only person who doesn't attack Laura, but she doesn't achieve being really her friend because she's too weak. She ends up marrying with her love thanks to Laura, who causes their approaches to happen.
- Priest Joan: one of the few positive characters, he foresees danger in Pere's and Laura's relationship and believes in the girl's innocence when the rumours are spread, so he offers to act as an middleman so that she can return to her house (without doing it on time). He keeps in contact with her when she's locked away in the convent. He maintains a museum despite the contempt of the villagers.
- Joanet: relative who has a sister whom he treats as a servant and doesn't let her be operated of a tumour (the excuse is that she doesn't want any man to touch her, despite being a doctor). He stars ridiculous scenes and chases prostitutes.
- Mistress of Torroella: she's one of the Comarquinal women who spread the rumours about the adultery the most, with the pretext of having privileged information, because she's a family's friend. She keeps a grudge towards Pere, who she wanted as a husband for one of her daughters.
- Ventura: relative of Llibori who also acts as a spreader of the stories of the couple, she finds them in a church (where they casually run into) and explains it to everyone, rushing the ending.
