= The Conformist (novel) =

1951 novel by Alberto Moravia

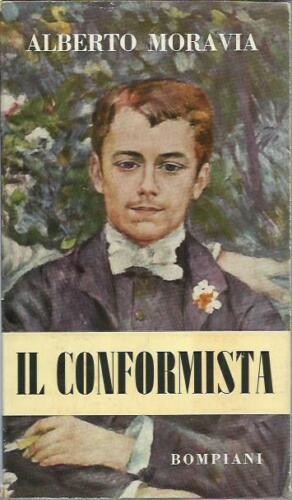
- First edition (Italian)
- Author: Alberto Moravia
- Original title: Il conformista
- Language: Italian
- Genre: Psychological fiction
- Publisher: Bompiani; English: Farrar, Straus and Giroux
- Publication date: 1951
- Publication place: Italy
- English publication date: 1951
- Media type: Print (Hardback and Paperback)
- Pages: 392 (First edition)
- OCLC: 3356490

The Conformist (Italian: Il conformista) is a novel by Alberto Moravia published in 1951, which details the life and desire for normality of a government official during Italy's fascist period. It is also known for the 1970 film adaptation by Bernardo Bertolucci.

== Synopsis ==
=== Prologue ===
A boy named Marcello kills lizards in the yard near his home. He tries to coax his neighbor and friend Roberto into offering approval of this behavior, to no avail. They then fight, and Roberto leaves. After obtaining a slingshot, Marcello fires stones through the fence around Roberto's house, killing their family cat instead of Roberto. Marcello is mortified not so much by his actions but by the "abnormality" of his sentiments.

Marcello later witnesses a fight between his parents. His father ultimately chases his mother around the house and attacks her in the bedroom, leaving Marcello torn between whether to rescue his mother or aid his father.

When the summer is over, Marcello is tormented by his classmates, who use his "effeminate" appearance to question his gender. One day, five classmates follow Marcello from school and try to force him to wear a skirt. Their attack is interrupted by Lino, a chauffeur who then offers to drive Marcello home. En route, Lino appears to proposition Marcello, offering him a pistol in exchange for unspecified actions. Lino, who is a former priest de-frocked for indecent behavior, ultimately stops himself before initiating any actions with Marcello. He begs Marcello to ignore him if he tries to speak to him again. Marcello does not fully understand what is happening. Meanwhile, Marcello's father vandalizes a photograph of his wife and Marcello by poking holes through their eyes and drawing streaks of blood on their faces.

At school, Marcello decides that the pistol may help him gain his classmates' respect and meets Lino again. This time, Lino locks himself in his room with Marcello, planning to abuse him. During the struggle, Lino's gun comes loose and Marcello grabs it. When Lino asks Marcello to shoot, the latter complies and flees out the window, leaving the pistol behind.

=== Part I ===
In 1937, Marcello is an employee of the Italian Fascist government, looking through old newspaper clippings for information on the incident with Lino. He ultimately finds an obituary that blames the death on an accident during the cleaning of the gun.

Orlando, a colleague of Marcello, asks him to participate in a mission to Paris. A former professor of Marcello, Quadri, is an anti-fascist agitator, and the Italian government would like to infiltrate his organization. Marcello is also due to be married to someone named Giulia and offers to have his honeymoon in Paris so that his presence there would not raise suspicions.

Marcello also takes confession, despite his apparent atheism, as a prelude to the Catholic wedding Giulia expects. He confesses to murdering Lino, and the priest indicates that he can seek absolution if he feels true remorse for his actions – an emotion that Marcello does not appear capable of feeling.

In the days leading up to the wedding, Marcello's mother-in-law lavishingly praises him while his mother lives alone in squalor. For six years, his father has been in an asylum and believes that he is one of Mussolini's top aides. Marcello's mother gives her son a wedding present but indicates that she will not be attending the ceremony. The two make their monthly visit to his father, who neither recognizes them nor acknowledges their presence.

=== Part II ===
En route to Paris, Marcello makes a scheduled stop at a brothel in a small town in France, where he is to meet Orlando for further instructions. There, Marcello is mistaken for a client, before Orlando arrives to reveal that the new plan is to kill Quadri. Marcello needs simply to confirm Quadri's identity to Orlando to fulfill his duties. While leaving, Marcello realizes that he forgot his hat. When he goes to retrieve it, he finds Orlando with a prostitute to whom Marcello feels some attraction.

Marcello and Giulia visit Quadri. He is married to Lina, a French woman who reminds Marcello of the prostitute. Marcello starts believing that he is in love with Lina despite her apparent dislike for him. Lina allows Marcello to begin to seduce her but always keeps him at arm's length, even saying that she and Quadri know that he is a Fascist spy.

While Lina and Giulia head out shopping, he is accosted by an old man who first mistakes him for a beggar and then mistakes him for a homosexual, or perhaps a prostitute, making Marcello revisit the humiliation of the incident with Lino. When the man refuses to drive him back to the hotel, Marcello pulls his gun and demands to be let out of the Rolls.

Marcello's feelings for Lina intensify alongside a growing contempt for her when he sees her attempting to seduce Giulia and realizes that her interest in him is merely for show. At a dinner covertly supervised by Orlando, Quadri asks Marcello to secretly post a letter for him on his way back to Italy, as Quadri's activities are monitored and the letter might be intercepted otherwise. Marcello refuses, and Quadri takes this as a sign of solidarity, as Marcello could have taken the letter and turned it over to the authorities instead. However, Marcello eventually confirms Quadri's identity to Orlando.

While later arguing in a nightclub, Giulia tells Lina that she is not a lesbian and has no interest in an affair. On his trip to Savoy, Quadri – as well as Lina, who left with him in response to Giulia's rejection – is killed by Orlando and his men.

=== Epilogue ===
Marcello has conflicted responses to his role in the death of the couple and tries to rationalize away his culpability. Years later, on the night Mussolini falls from power, Giulia reveals that she has long suspected Marcello's involvement in the murders but is sadder for their safety than for his victims or his duplicity.

The two go out for a drive and walk that evening, and while Giulia tries to convince Marcello to have sex with her in a wooded area, a stranger calls to him by name. He turns out to be Lino. Marcello screams at Lino and blames him for ruining his life by taking his innocence. Lino defends himself by arguing that the loss of innocence is inevitable and is merely a part of the human experience. That speech leads Marcello to the beginning of acceptance of his non-conformity.

Marcello, Giulia, and their daughter later drive to the mountains to evade possible reprisals for his role with the government. En route, they drive into an air raid, and their car is strafed with bullets. Giulia and her daughter are killed in the first wave, and Marcello falls out of the car, wounded. Realizing that his wife and daughter are dead, he waits for the second wave to return. Marcello then hears the plane's approach.

== Major themes ==
Marcello spends the entire novel in search of what he perceives to be a normal life - normal activities, a normal appearance, normal emotions, and so on. However, he confuses normality with conformity, and in his quest to conform, subjugates his already repressed emotions. When the natural course of his life presents him with ethical dilemmas - the assignment to betray Professor Quadri, and his attraction to women other than his wife - he is ill-prepared to deal with them. Moravia also intimates a connection between sexual repression and fascism.

== See also ==
- The Garden of the Finzi-Contini - another Italian novel and film about life during Mussolini's regime.
