= Province of Rome =

Former province of Lazio, Italy

Coordinates: 41°53′35″N 12°28′58″E

Province of Rome Provincia di Roma
- Province
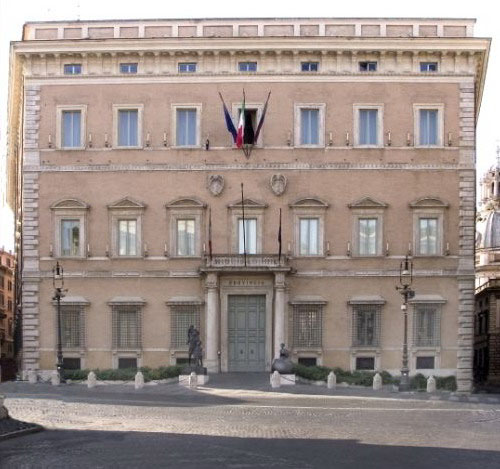
- Palazzo Valentini, the provincial seat

- Flag Coat of arms

- Map highlighting the location of the province of Rome in Italy
- Country: Italy
- Region: Lazio
- Capital(s): Rome

Area
  - Total: 5,352 km^{2} (2,066 sq mi)

Population (31 July 2015)
  - Total: 4,336,251
  - Density: 810.2/km^{2} (2,098/sq mi)
- Time zone: UTC+01:00 (CET)
  - Summer (DST): UTC+02:00 (CEST)
- Postal code: n/a
- Telephone prefix: 06,667,3898
- Vehicle registration: RM
- ISTAT: 058

The province of Rome (Italian: provincia di Roma) was one of the five provinces that formed part of the Lazio region of Italy. It was established in 1870 and disestablished in 2014. It was essentially coterminous with the Rome metropolitan area. The city of Rome was the provincial capital. During the 1920s, the boundary of the province shrank as land was ceded to establish new provinces. The province of Rome was the most populous province in Italy. On 1 January 2015, it was superseded by a new local government body—the Metropolitan City of Rome Capital.

== History ==
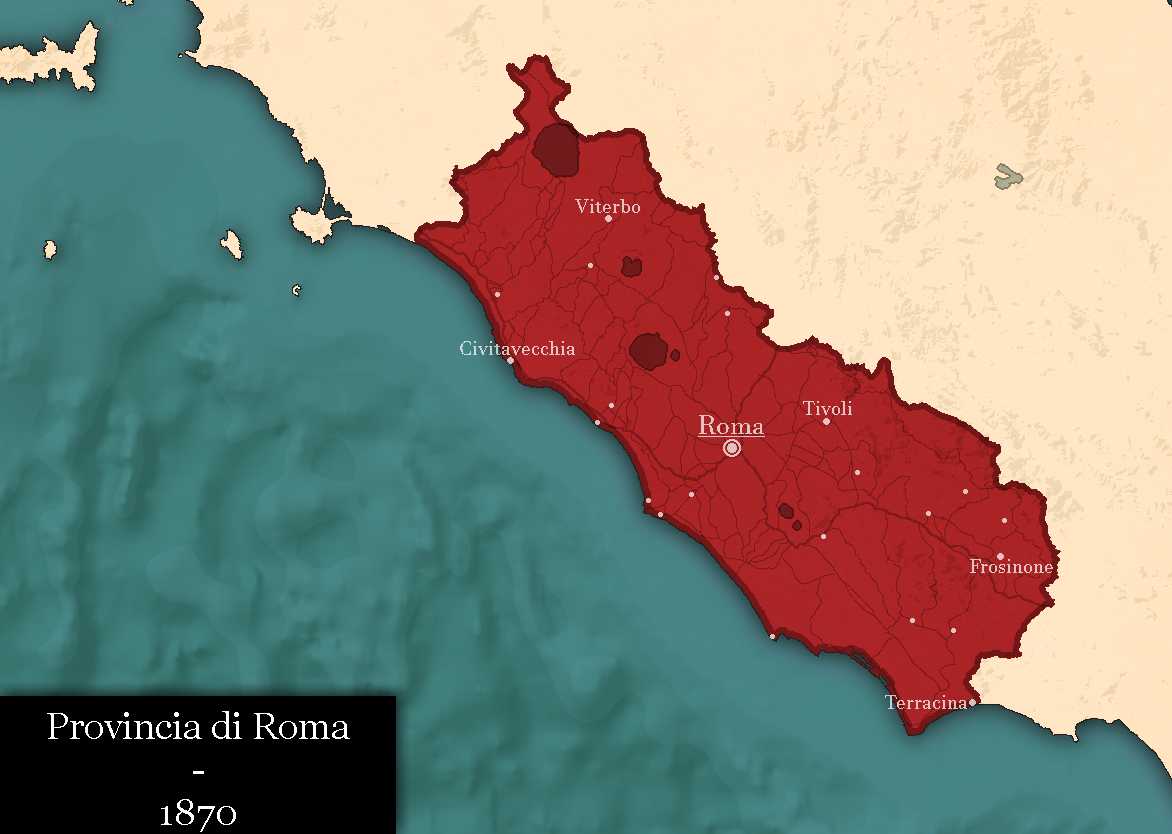
Map of the province of Rome from 1870 to 1923

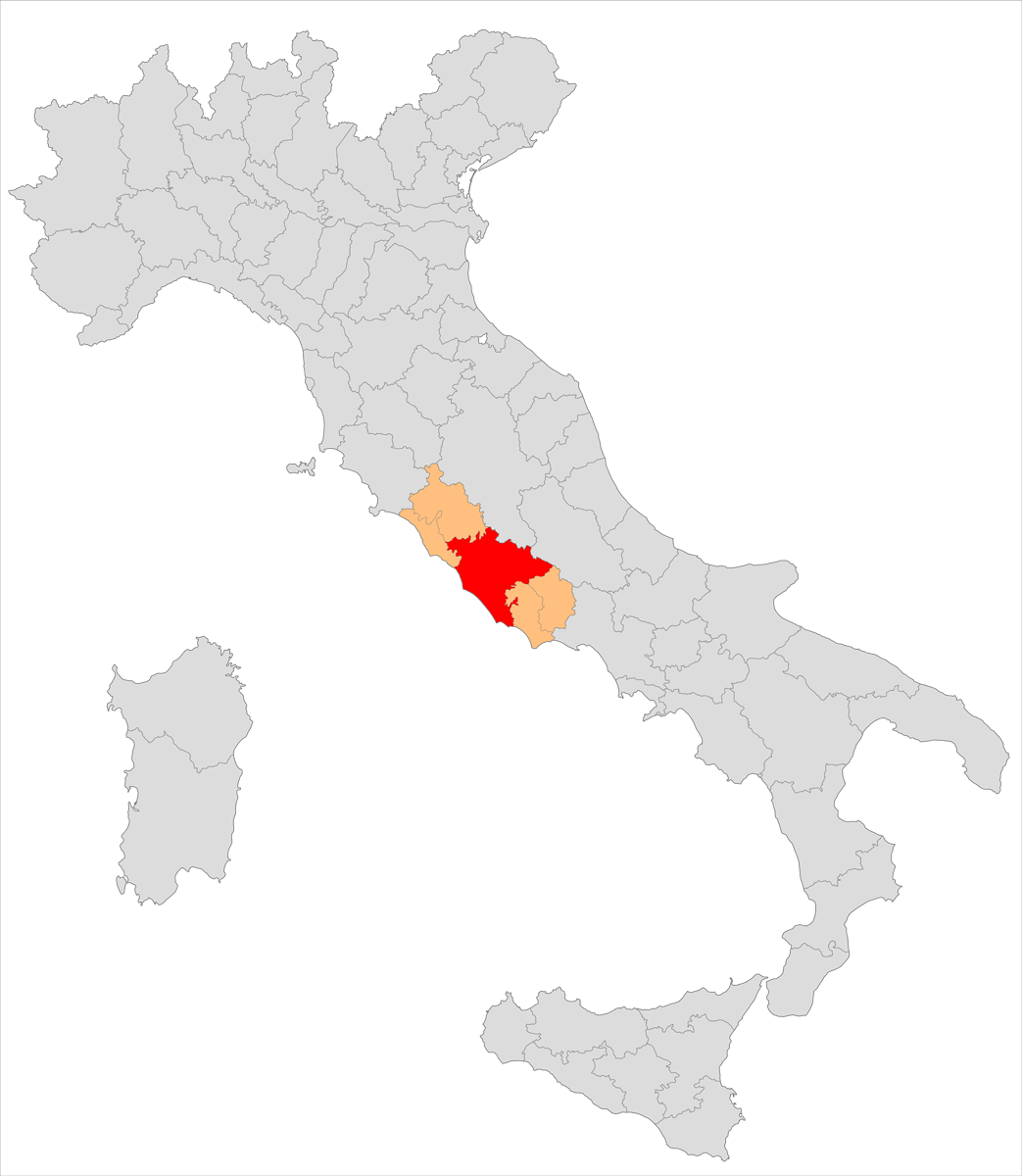
Areas in light and dark orange color was the old province of Rome; area in dark orange color only is the Circondario di Roma.

Prior to 1870, the area of the province was the Papal States. Following the Capture of Rome by the forces of the Kingdom of Italy, the province of Rome was established. The province was initially divided into five "districts" (Italian: circondari or Italian: circondario): Rome, Civitavecchia, Frosinone, Velletri and Viterbo. They corresponded to the old papal delegazioni.

In 1923 the district of Rieti, formerly part of the province of Perugia, was annexed to that of Rome. In 1927 the provincial territory was reduced through the creation of new provinces: Frosinone, Rieti and Viterbo. After a few months, the comuni (municipalities) of Amaseno, Castro dei Volsci and Vallecorsa also were annexed to the province of Frosinone, while Monte Romano was annexed to that of Viterbo. In 1934 the provincial territory lost its southern part, which became the new province of Latina.

== See also ==
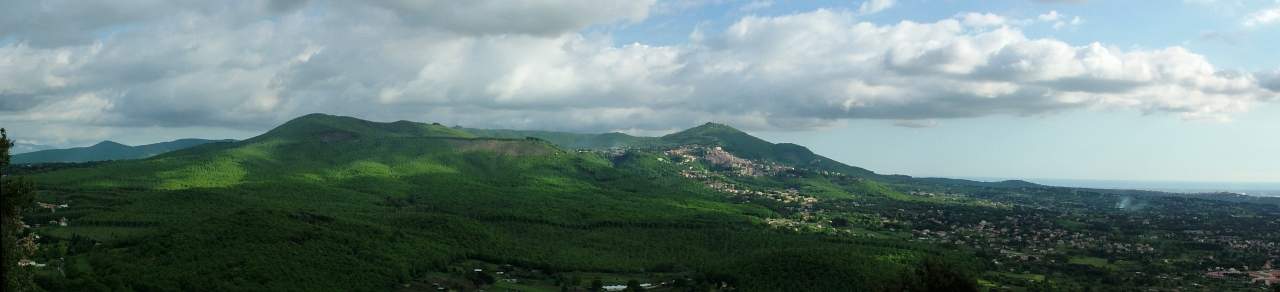
View of the Alban Hills

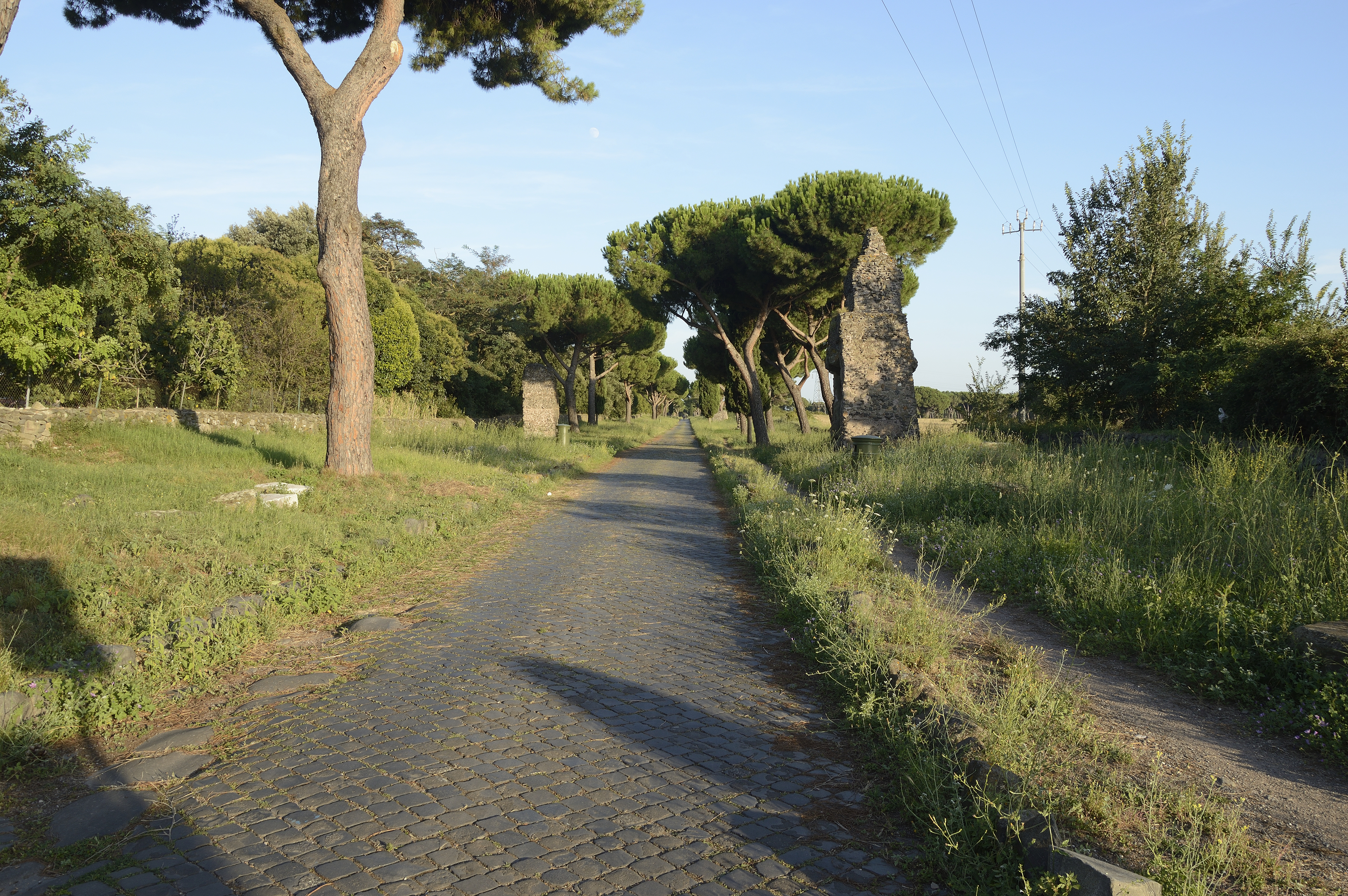
The Appian Way

- Metropolitan City of Rome Capital
- Administrative subdivisions of the Papal States from 1816 to 1870
- Latium – the oldest regional division of the former province and current Metropolitan City of Rome Capital
- Metropolitan City of Rome Capital topics
- Pond Granieri
