= Two Women =

1960 film by Vittorio De Sica

- Italian theatrical release poster
- Italian: La ciociara
- Directed by: Vittorio De Sica
- Screenplay by: Cesare Zavattini; Vittorio De Sica (uncredited)
- Based on: Two Women by Alberto Moravia
- Produced by: Carlo Ponti
- Starring: Sophia Loren; Jean-Paul Belmondo; Eleonora Brown; Raf Vallone
- Cinematography: Gábor Pogány
- Edited by: Adriana Novelli
- Music by: Armando Trovajoli
- Production companies: Compagnia Cinematografica Champion; Les Films Marceau; Cocinor; Société Générale de Cinématographie
- Distributed by: Titanus (Italy); Cocinor-Marceau (France)
- Release dates: 22 December 1960 (Milan premiere); 23 December 1960 (Italy); 17 May 1961 (France)
- Running time: 100 minutes
- Countries: Italy; France
- Languages: Italian; German
- Budget: $850,000
- Box office: $7.2 million (US and Canada); 2,030,033 admissions (France); 9,662,000 admissions (Italy)

Two Women (Italian: La ciociara [la tʃoˈtʃaːra], rough literal translation "The Woman from Ciociaria") is a 1960 war drama film directed by Vittorio De Sica from a screenplay he co-wrote with Cesare Zavattini, based on the 1957 novel of the same name by Alberto Moravia. The film stars Sophia Loren, Jean-Paul Belmondo, Eleonora Brown and Raf Vallone. It tells the story of a woman trying to protect her young daughter from the horrors of war. The story is fictional but based on actual events of 1944 in Rome and rural Lazio, during the Marocchinate.

Loren's performance received critical acclaim, earning her the 1961 Academy Award for Best Actress, making her the first Italian actress to win for Best Actress in an Italian-language film as well as the first individual to win for a foreign-language performance.

== Plot ==
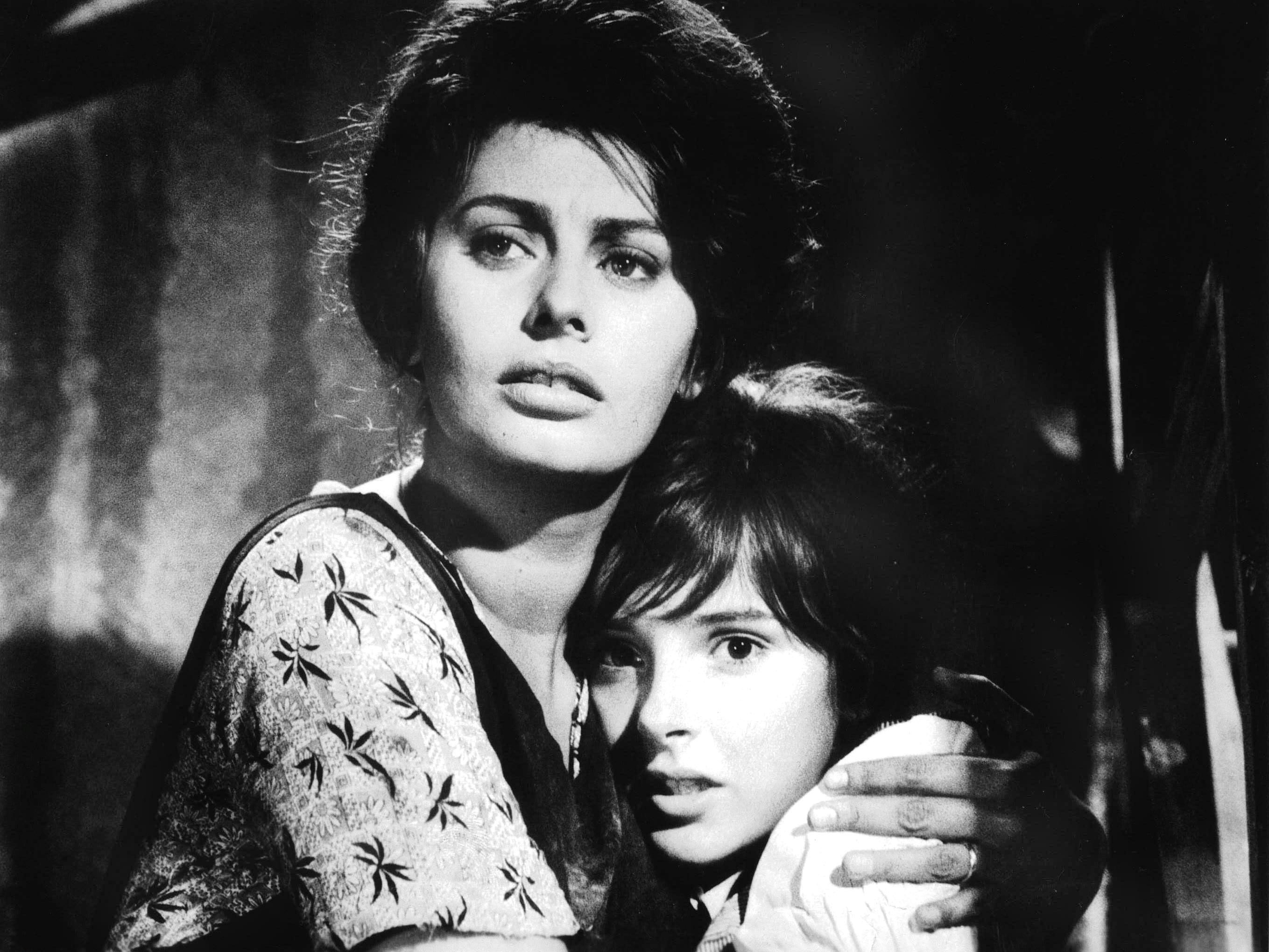
Cesira and Rosetta in a scene from the movie

Cesira is a widowed shopkeeper, raising her devoutly religious twelve-year-old daughter, Rosetta, in Rome during World War II. Following the bombing of Rome, mother and daughter flee to Cesira's native Ciociaria, a rural, mountainous province of central Italy. The night before they go, Cesira has sex with Giovanni (Vallone), a married coal dealer in her neighbourhood, who agrees to look after her store in her absence.

After they arrive at Ciociaria, Cesira attracts the attention of Michele, a young local intellectual with communist sympathies. Rosetta sees Michele as a father figure and develops a strong bond with him. Michele is later taken prisoner by German soldiers, who force him to act as a guide through the mountainous terrain.

After the Allies capture Rome, in June 1944, Cesira and Rosetta decide to head back to that city. On the way, the two are gang-raped inside a church by a group of Moroccan Goumiers – soldiers attached to the invading Allied Armies in Italy. Rosetta is traumatized by the unwilling loss of her virginity, becoming detached and distant from her mother and no longer an innocent child.

When the two manage to find shelter at a neighbouring village, Rosetta disappears during the night, sending Cesira into a panic. She thinks Rosetta has gone to look for Michele, but later finds out that Michele was killed by the Germans. Rosetta returns, having been out with an older boy, who has given her silk stockings, despite her youth. Cesira is outraged and upset, slapping and spanking Rosetta for her behavior, but Rosetta remains unresponsive, emotionally distant. When Cesira informs Rosetta of Michele's death, Rosetta begins to cry like the little girl she had been prior to the rape. The film ends with Cesira comforting the child.

== Cast ==
- Sophia Loren as Cesira
- Jean-Paul Belmondo as Michele Di Libero
- Eleonora Brown as Rosetta
- Carlo Ninchi as Filippo, Michele's father
- Raf Vallone as Giovanni
- Andrea Checchi as A fascist
- Pupella Maggio as Peasant
- Bruna Cealti as Refugee
- Antonella Della Porta as A crazy mother
- Mario Frera
- Franco Balducci as German in the haystack
- Luciana Cortellesi
- Curt Lowens
- Tony Calio
- Remo Galavotti

== Production ==
The film was based on a 1957 novel by Alberto Moravia, La ciociara (The Woman From Ciociaria). It was inspired by Moravia's experiences during World War II.

Carlo Ponti bought the film rights along with Marcello Girosi for a reported US$100,000. Sophia Loren was always meant to star and there was some talk that the film might be financed by Paramount, with whom Loren had made a number of movies. Anna Magnani was going to play the lead and Loren was going to be her daughter. George Cukor was going to direct as part of a two-picture deal with Ponti, the other one being Heller in Pink Tights (1960). The film was going to be shot as part of a six-picture deal between Ponti and Paramount.

Cukor and Paramount dropped out. Vittorio De Sica became attached as director. Magnani pulled out, supposedly because she did not want to play Loren's mother, leading to Loren taking Magnani's role, even though the former was only 25 at the time. However, De Sica says it was his decision for Loren to play Magnani's role and cast a younger performer as the daughter "for great poignancy. If, in doing this, we moved away from original line of Moravia, we had better opportunity to stress, to underline, the monstrous impact of war on people. The historical truth is that the great majority of those raped were young girls." In a 2017 interview, Brown stated that Loren protected her from some of the underlying implications of the rape scene in the film, and also stated that director De Sica brought her to tears for the climactic final scene of hearing that Belmondo's character has died, by saying that a telegram had arrived saying that Brown's parents had died in an accident.

Magnani said she was going to do it, "Moravia wanted me, but Ponti got it, and Moravia did not fight. After that, they went through all the roles I'd turned down for Sophia Loren to play." "The book was one of the most beautiful I've ever read", said Loren. "I thought it was worth taking the risk at 25 to play an older woman because the story was so beautiful." Loren later said her performance was inspired by her memories of her mother during the war. She also said she was greatly helped by her experience acting in Desire Under the Elms (1958).

Ponti raised money from France and Italy. French investment was conditional upon a French star being used, which led to the casting of Jean-Paul Belmondo, who had leapt to international fame in Breathless (1960). Belmondo's voice was dubbed into Italian by Achille Millo.

== Release ==
Joseph E. Levine (Embassy Pictures) agreed to buy US release rights after watching only nine minutes of the film. "I bet Sophia she'd win the Oscar and I nursed that film like a baby", Levine later said. He showed the film in every city that a member of the academy jury lived and promoted it assiduously. "That showed foreign films could get big audiences if promoted with flair", said Levine.

The film was among the 30 most popular films at the French box office that year. In 1962, it grossed $3 million rentals in North America.

== Reception ==
On the review aggregator website Rotten Tomatoes, 88% of 8 critics' reviews are positive.

== Accolades ==
Award	Category	Nominee(s)	Result
Academy Awards	Best Actress	Sophia Loren	Won
Bambi Awards	Best Actress – International	Sophia Loren	Won
Blue Ribbon Awards	Best Foreign Language Film	Vittorio De Sica	Won
British Academy Film Awards	Best Foreign Actress	Sophia Loren	Won
Cannes Film Festival	Palme d'Or	Vittorio De Sica	Nominated
Cannes Film Festival	Best Actress	Sophia Loren	Won
David di Donatello Awards	Best Actress	Sophia Loren	Won
Golden Globe Awards	Best Motion Picture – Foreign Language		Won
Laurel Awards	Top Drama		Nominated
Nastro d'Argento	Best Actress	Sophia Loren	Won
National Board of Review Awards	Top Foreign Films		3rd Place
New York Film Critics Circle Awards	Best Foreign Language Film		Nominated
New York Film Critics Circle Awards	Best Actress	Sophia Loren	Won
Sant Jordi Awards	Best Performance in a Foreign Film	Sophia Loren	Won

The film was submitted two days late to be eligible as the 1960 Italian entry for the Academy Award for Best Foreign Language Film.

== Remakes ==
La Ciociara was remade for television in 1988. It was adapted by Diana Gould, Lidia Ravera, Dino Risi, and Bernardino Zapponi. It was directed by Risi, and starred Loren, Robert Loggia, Leonardo Ferrantini, Dario Ghirardi, and Sydney Penny. The opera La Ciociara written by Luca Rossi, with music composed by Marco Tutino, received its premiere at San Francisco Opera, and a European premiere at Teatro Lirico, Cagliari.

== See also ==
- List of actors nominated for Academy Awards for non-English performances
- List of Italian Academy Award winners and nominees
