= The Conformist (1970 film) =

Film by Bernardo Bertolucci

- Theatrical release poster
- Italian: Il conformista
- Directed by: Bernardo Bertolucci
- Screenplay by: Bernardo Bertolucci
- Based on: The Conformist by Alberto Moravia
- Produced by: Maurizio Lodi-Fè
- Starring: Jean-Louis Trintignant; Stefania Sandrelli; Gastone Moschin; Enzo Tarascio; Fosco Giachetti; José Quaglio; Dominique Sanda; Pierre Clémenti
- Cinematography: Vittorio Storaro
- Edited by: Franco Arcalli
- Music by: Georges Delerue
- Production companies: Mars Film Produzione; Marianne Productions; Maran Film
- Distributed by: Paramount Pictures (Italy); Cinema International Corporation (France and West Germany)
- Release dates: 1 July 1970 (Berlin); 7 October 1970 (Italy); 17 February 1971 (France); 16 April 1971 (West Germany)
- Running time: 108 minutes
- Countries: Italy; France; West Germany
- Language: Italian
- Budget: $750,000
- Box office: ₤207.3 million (Italy); 570,149 admissions (France)

The Conformist (Italian: Il conformista) is a 1970 political drama film written and directed by Bernardo Bertolucci, based on the 1951 novel by Alberto Moravia. It stars Jean-Louis Trintignant, Stefania Sandrelli, Gastone Moschin, Enzo Tarascio, Fosco Giachetti, José Quaglio, Dominique Sanda and Pierre Clémenti. Set in 1930s Italy, The Conformist centers on a mid-level Fascist functionary (Trintignant) who is ordered to assassinate his former professor, an anti-Fascist dissident in Paris. His mission is complicated after he begins an affair with the professor's wife (Sanda).

An international co-production between Italian, French and West German companies, The Conformist opened at the 20th Berlin International Film Festival. It received widespread acclaim from critics, and appeared on several lists of the best films of 1970. Among other accolades, it won the David di Donatello for Best Film, the Sutherland Trophy, and was nominated for an Academy Award for Best Adapted Screenplay and the Golden Globe Award for Best Foreign Language Film. The cinematography, by Vittorio Storaro, was also highly praised and launched his international career.

Retrospective reviews have been equally positive, both towards the film's cinematic merits as well as its political content. The film was highly influential towards later works, including Francis Ford Coppola's Godfather trilogy, and has been cited as one of the greatest films of all time.

In 2008, the film was included on the Italian Ministry of Cultural Heritage's 100 Italian films to be saved, a list of 100 films that "have changed the collective memory of the country between 1942 and 1978".

== Plot ==
In 1938 Paris, Marcello Clerici finalises his preparations to assassinate his former university professor, Luca Quadri, leaving his wife, Giulia, in their hotel room. After receiving a call, Marcello is collected in a car driven by his subordinate, Special Agent Manganiello.

A series of flashbacks depict Marcello discussing with his blind friend, Italo, his plans to marry, his attempts to join the Fascist secret police, and his visits to his parents in Rome: a morphine-addicted mother at the family's decaying villa, and his father at an insane asylum.

In a flashback to 1917, Marcello is a boy being bullied by his schoolmates until he is rescued by Lino, a chauffeur. Lino shows him a pistol and then sexually assaults him. Marcello partially responds before grabbing the pistol and firing into the walls and at Lino. He then flees, believing he has committed murder.

In another flashback, Marcello and Giulia discuss the necessity of his going to confession, even though he is an atheist, in order for her Roman Catholic parents to permit their marriage. Marcello agrees and, in confession, admits to the priest that he has committed several sins, including his rape by and subsequent murder of Lino, premarital sex, and his lack of guilt for these sins. Marcello admits he thinks little of Giulia but craves the normality that a traditional marriage with children would bring. The priest is shocked but absolves Marcello upon learning that he is working for the Fascist secret police.

In Ventimiglia, Marcello meets with Fascist officer Raoul, who orders him to assassinate Professor Quadri, an outspoken anti-Fascist intellectual now living in exile in France. Using his honeymoon as a cover, Marcello takes Giulia to Paris to carry out the mission.

While visiting Quadri, Marcello falls in love with Anna, the professor's French wife, and pursues her. Although she and her husband are aware of Marcello's dangerous Fascist sympathies, she responds to his advances and forms a close attachment to Giulia, towards whom she also makes sexual advances. Giulia and Anna dress extravagantly and go to a dance hall with their husbands, where Marcello's commitment to the Fascists is tested by Quadri. Manganiello is also present. Having followed Marcello for some time he is now doubting his intentions. Marcello secretly returns the gun he has been given and provides Manganiello with the location of Quadri's country house in Savoy, where the couple plan to go the following day.

Even though Marcello has warned Anna not to accompany her husband to the countryside, she makes the car journey nonetheless. On a deserted alpine road, Fascist agents fatally stab Quadri as Anna watches in horror. When the men turn their attention to her, she runs to the car behind for help. On seeing Marcello as the passenger in the back seat and realising his betrayal, Anna begins to scream before fleeing into the woods to escape the agents. Marcello watches as she is pursued through the forest and shot to death. Manganiello walks away from the car for a cigarette, disgusted by Marcello's cowardice in not shooting Anna when she ran to their car.

In 1943, amidst Benito Mussolini's resignation and the fall of the Fascist regime in Italy, Marcello now has a daughter with Giulia and appears settled in a conventional life. One night, Marcello walks the streets of Rome with Italo as crowds celebrate the fall of Mussolini. Marcello overhears two men flirting with each other. He recognises one of them as Lino, who survived his earlier attack; Marcello then realizes that he never committed the murder he has agonized over since childhood. He starts yelling, denouncing Lino as a Fascist, a homosexual, and the murderer of the Quadris. Lino flees and, in his frenzy, Marcello also denounces Italo as a Fascist. As an anti-Fascist crowd sweeps past, taking Italo with them, Marcello sits near a small fire and stares behind him at the young man Lino had been speaking to, now naked on a bed.

== Cast ==
- Jean-Louis Trintignant as Marcello Clerici
  - Pasquale Fortunato as young Marcello
- Stefania Sandrelli as Giulia
- Gastone Moschin as Manganiello
- Dominique Sanda as Anna Quadri
- Pierre Clémenti as Lino Semirama
- Enzo Tarascio as Professor Luca Quadri
- José Quaglio as Italo Montanari
- Fosco Giachetti as the colonel
- Yvonne Sanson as Giulia's mother
- Milly as Marcello's mother
- Giuseppe Addobbati as Marcello's father
- Antonio Maestri as Don Lattanzi
- Alessandro Haber as a blind drunk
- Christian Aligny as Raoul
- Pierangelo Civera as Franz
- Orso Maria Guerrini as an assassin
- Marta Lado as Marcello's daughter (uncredited)
- Benedetto Benedetti as the minister (uncredited)
- Joel Barcellos as a student (uncredited)

== Themes ==
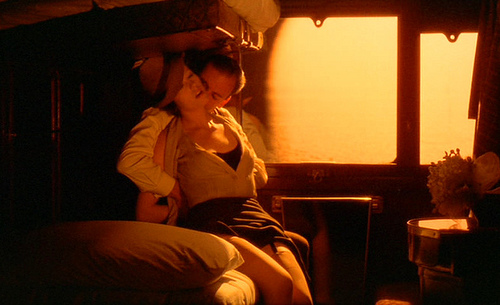
Marcello seduces Giulia during their train ride to Paris.

The film is a case study in the psychology of conformism and fascism: Marcello Clerici is a bureaucrat, cultivated and intellectual but largely dehumanized by an intense need to be "normal" and to belong to whatever is the current dominant socio-political group. He grew up in an upper class, perhaps dysfunctional family, and he suffered a major childhood sexual trauma and gun violence episode in which he long believed (erroneously) that he had committed a murder. He accepts an assignment from Benito Mussolini's secret police to assassinate his former mentor, living in exile in Paris. In Trintignant's characterization, Clerici is willing to sacrifice his values in the interests of building a supposedly "normal life".

According to the political philosopher Takis Fotopoulos, "This psychological need to conform and be 'normal' at the social level, in general, and the political level, in particular, was beautifully portrayed" by The Conformist, as well as Eugène Ionesco's 1959 play Rhinoceros.

According to the 1992 documentary Visions of Light, the film is widely praised as a visual masterpiece. It was photographed by Vittorio Storaro, who used rich colours, authentic wardrobe of the 1930s and a series of unusual camera angles and fluid camera movement. Film critic and author Robin Buss wrote that the cinematography suggests Clerici's inability to conform with "normal" reality: the reality of the time is "abnormal". Also, Bertolucci's cinematic style synthesises expressionism and "fascist" film aesthetics. Its style has been compared with classic German films of the 1920s and 1930s, such as in Leni Riefenstahl's Triumph of the Will (1935) and Fritz Lang's Metropolis (1927).

In 2013, Interiors, an online journal concerned with the relationship between architecture and film, released an issue that discussed how space is used in a scene that takes place on the Palazzo dei Congressi. The issue highlights the use of architecture in the film, pointing out that in order to understand the film itself, it is essential to understand the history of the EUR district in Rome and its deep ties with fascism.

== Production ==
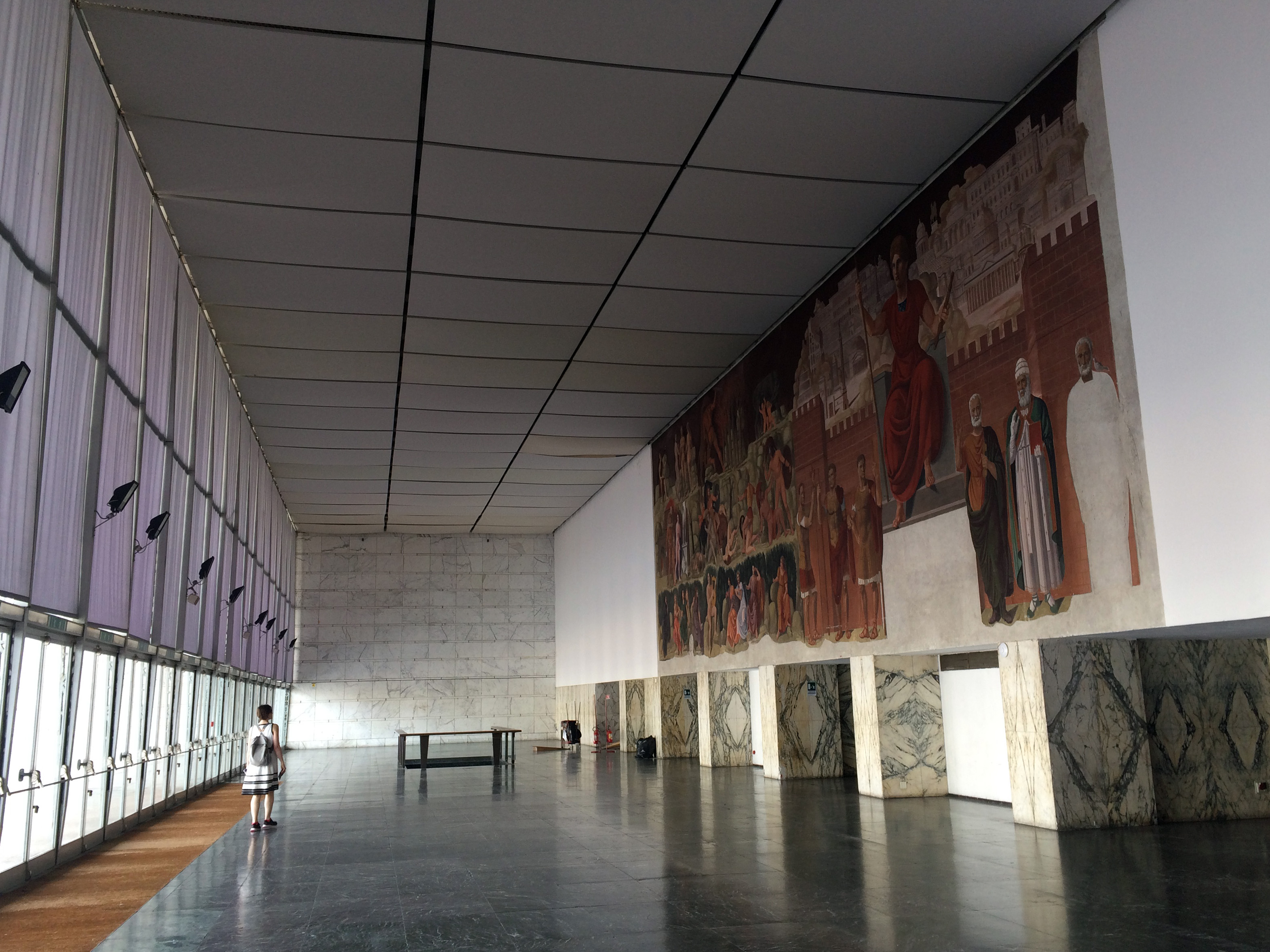
The entrance hall of Palazzo dei Congressi

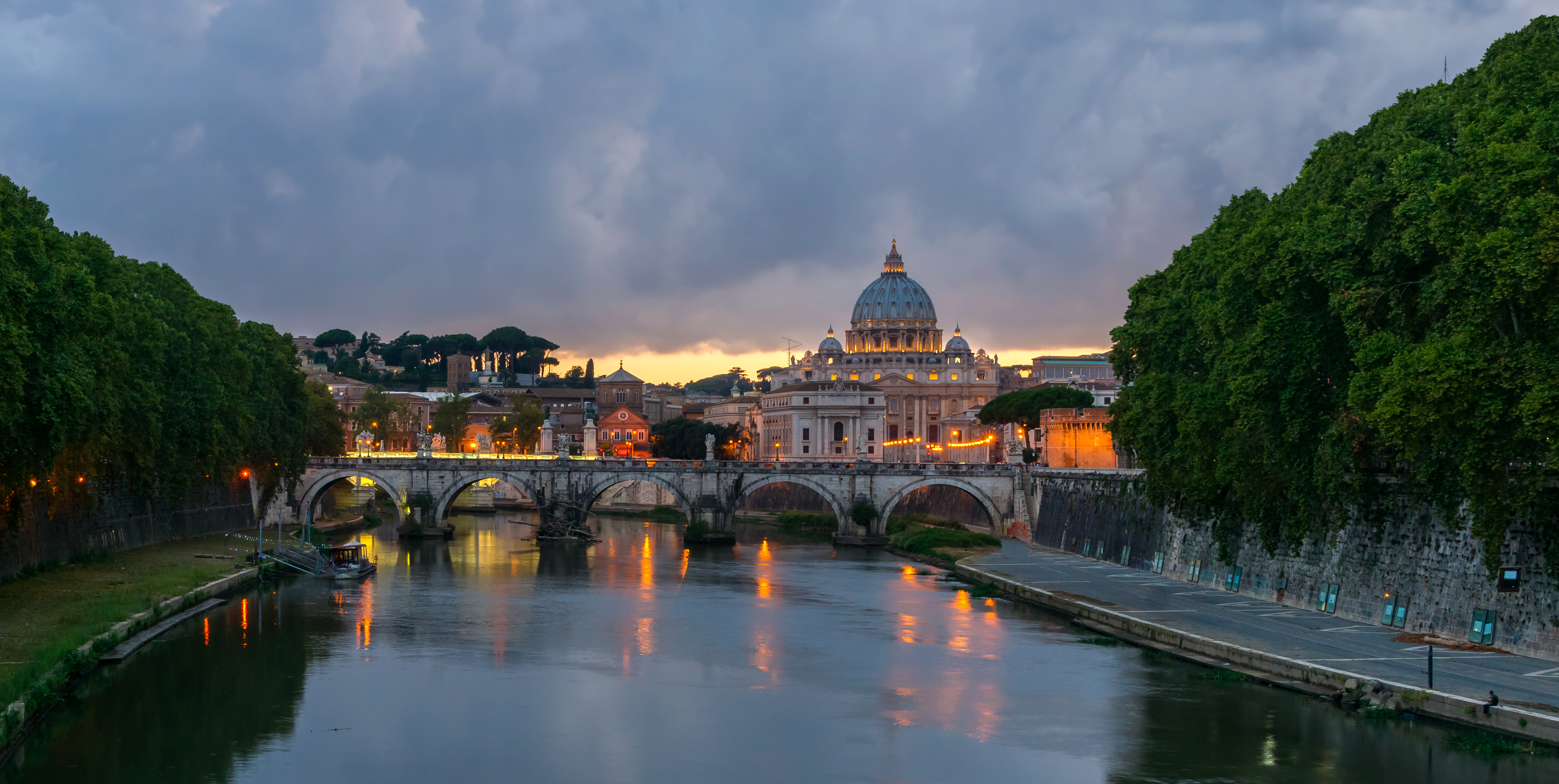
Sant' Angelo Bridge

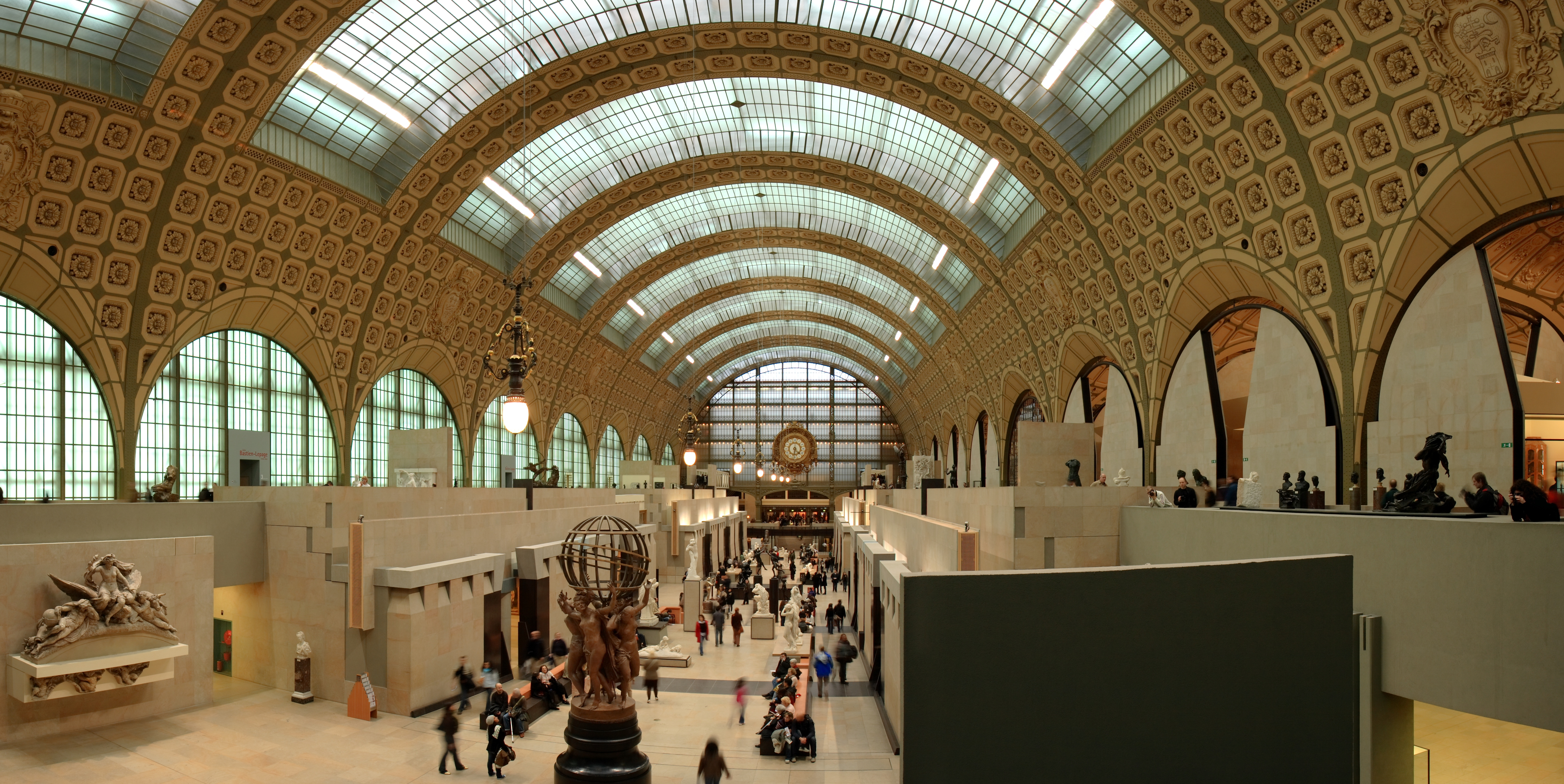
Gare d'Orsay

The Conformist was filmed in locations throughout Rome and Paris. Roman locations included the Palazzo dei Congressi, the Museum of the Ara Pacis, Sant' Angelo Bridge, Santa Marinella, the Theatre of Marcellus and the Colosseum. Parisian locales included Gare d'Orsay, Palais de Chaillot, and Joinville-le-Pont. The studio scenes were filmed at Cinecittà.

The film cost only seven hundred and fifty thousand dollars to produce.

Bertolucci, production designer Ferdinando Scarfiotti and cinematographer Vittorio Storaro made heavy use of the 1930s art and décor associated with the Fascist era: the middle-class drawing rooms and the huge halls of the ruling elite. The EUR district of Rome, which was commissioned by Benito Mussolini as a model city, and its rationalist architecture serves as one of the film's key locations.

Lead actor Trintignant learned his Italian-language lines phonetically, and per common practice in the Italian film industry at the time, was later dubbed over by another actor, Sergio Graziani. Other actors in the dub cast included Arturo Dominici, Rita Savagnone, Giuseppe Rinaldi and Lydia Simoneschi.

Bertolucci's first choices to play Giulia and Anna were Florinda Bolkan and Brigitte Bardot, but the former was busy shooting The Last Valley, and the latter disliked the script. Anouk Aimée was offered a role.

The use of in media res and non-chronological storytelling was not in the original script, but determined by Bertolucci and his editor Franco Arcalli during post-production.

=== Music ===
The soundtrack composed by Georges Delerue was originally released on LP in Italy in February 1971 by Cinevox. On 5 February 2013, Music Box Records released a limited edition of the soundtrack on CD, containing 15 previously unreleased songs.

== Release ==
The film premiered at the 20th Berlin International Film Festival on 1 July 1970, where it competed for the Golden Bear. However, due to a controversy surrounding the participation of Michael Verhoeven's anti-war film o.k., the festival was closed down three days later and no prizes were awarded.

The film had a staggered release in Italy, opening in major cities in the early months of 1971: Milan on 29 January, Turin on 5 February and Rome on 25 March, for example. In the United States, the film screened at the New York Film Festival on 18 September 1970 and was given a limited release in select cities the following spring, opening in New York and Los Angeles in April 1971, and Chicago and Washington, D.C., in May 1971. The first American release of the film was trimmed by five minutes compared to the Italian release; the missing scene features a group of blind people having a dance. They were restored in the 1996 reissue.

=== Home media ===
The film was released in the United States on DVD by Paramount Home Entertainment on 5 December 2006. The DVD includes the original theatrical version (runtime 111 minutes); The Rise of The Conformist: The Story, the Cast featurette; Shadow and Light: Filming The Conformist featurette; and The Conformist: Breaking New Ground featurette.

In 2011, the Cineteca di Bologna commissioned a 2K restoration of The Conformist, supervised by Storaro himself (and approved by Bertolucci), which screened in the Cannes Classics section of the Cannes Film Festival on 11 May 2011, in conjunction with the presentation of an honorary Palme d'Or to Bertolucci. The restoration was done by Minerva Pictures–RaroVideo USA and L'Immagine Ritrovata (laboratory of the Cineteca di Bologna). In 2014, the digital restoration was released theatrically by Kino Lorber at New York City's Film Forum on 29 August and on Blu-ray by Rarovideo USA on 25 November.

In 2023, Cineteca di Bologna in collaboration with Minerva Pictures under the supervision of Fondazione Bernardo Bertolucci (the Bernardo Bertolucci Foundation) produced a 4K restoration of The Conformist using the original camera negatives. It was released on Blu-ray by Kino Lorber in the US and Unobstructed View in Canada on 28 November.

== Reception ==
=== Critical response ===
Vincent Canby, film critic for The New York Times, praised Bertolucci's screenplay and his directorial effort, and wrote, "Bernardo Bertolucci ... has at last made a very middle-class, almost conventional movie that turns out to be one of the elegant surprises of the current New York Film Festival ... It is also apparent in Bertolucci's cinematic style, which is so rich, poetic, and baroque that it is simply incapable of meaning only what it says ... The movie is perfectly cast, from Trintignant and on down, including Pierre Clementi, who appears briefly as the wicked young man who makes a play for the young Marcello. The Conformist is flawed, perhaps, but those very flaws may make it Bertolucci's first commercially popular film, at least in Europe where there always seems to be a market for intelligent, upper middle-class decadence."

Pauline Kael, film critic for The New Yorker, called the film a "sumptuous and emotionally charged experience."

A review in Variety stated, "For those who appreciate its subtleties, but also its subsurface power and great evocative qualities, it's a gem." Gene Siskel of the Chicago Tribune gave the film two-and-a-half stars out of four and called it "much more of a show than a story," with its narrative themes "all but lost amid Bertolucci's splendid recreation of the era. In other words, if you are looking for fashion and furnishing hints, this is the place." Kevin Thomas of the Los Angeles Times wrote that the film "places young Bernardo Bertolucci in the front ranks of Italian directors and among the finest film-makers working anywhere. In this dazzling film, Bertolucci, 30, manages to combine the bravura style of a Fellini, the acute sense of period of a Visconti and the fervent political commitment of an Elio Petri (Investigation of a Private Citizen) with complete individuality and, better still, a total lack of self-indulgence."

Gary Arnold of The Washington Post wrote that the film was "an extraordinarily beautiful and spellbinding picture," but "what's below the surface doesn't stand up to much analysis. I think this is true and that it amounts to a terrible flaw. The dramatic material, while intriguing, isn't adequately developed: many connecting or explanatory scenes appear to be missing (reading the original novel by Alberto Moravia restores some of these), the psychology of the most complex characters is murky, and the climactic and concluding scenes are positively trite." Jan Dawson of The Monthly Film Bulletin wrote, "In his screen adaptation of Moravia's novel, Bertolucci has eliminated all explanations or analysed motivations, as well as any allusions to Marcello's life before the moment he first sees Lino ... The effort of these changes, in purely psychological terms, is to reduce Marcello's story to a model Freudian case history."

In 1994, critic James Berardinelli wrote a review and heralded the film's look: "Storaro and Bertolucci have fashioned a visual masterpiece in The Conformist, with some of the best use of light and shadow ever in a motion picture. This isn't just photography, it's art – powerful, beautiful, and effective. There's a scene in the woods, with sunlight streaming between trees, that's breathtaking to behold – and all the more stunning because of the brutal events that take place before this background."

In a 2012 article in The Guardian, John Patterson defined the film as an "expressionist masterpiece", which "offered a blueprint for a new kind of Hollywood film", inspiring New Hollywood filmmakers.

On the review aggregator website Rotten Tomatoes, 98% of 60 critics' reviews are positive, with an average rating of 8.9/10. The website's consensus reads: "A commentary on fascism and beauty alike, Bernardo Bertolucci's The Conformist is acclaimed for its sumptuous visuals and extravagant, artful cinematography." Metacritic, which uses a weighted average, assigned the film a score of 100 out of 100, based on 11 critics, indicating "universal acclaim".

Trintignant considered The Conformist one of the best films he acted in.

=== Accolades ===
Wins

- Berlin Film Festival: Interfilm Award - Recommendation and Journalists' Special Award, Bernardo Bertolucci; 1970.
- David di Donatello Awards: David; Best Film, Maurizio Lodi-Fe; 1971.
- Belgian Film Critics Association: Grand Prix; 1972.
- National Society of Film Critics Awards: NSFC Award; Best Cinematography, Vittorio Storaro; Best Director, Bernardo Bertolucci; 1972.
- Satellite Awards: Satellite Award: Best Classic DVD; 2006.

Nominations

- Berlin Film Festival: Golden Berlin Bear, Bernardo Bertolucci; 1970.
- Academy Awards: Oscar; Best Writing, Screenplay Based on Material from Another Medium, Bernardo Bertolucci; 1972.
- Golden Globes: Golden Globe; Best Foreign-Language Foreign Film Italy; 1972.

== Legacy ==
The film was influential on other filmmakers; the image of blowing leaves in The Conformist, for example, influenced a very similar scene in The Godfather Part II (1974) by Francis Ford Coppola. Coppola also cast actor Gastone Moschin in the same film, based on his role in The Conformist.

Additionally, the scene in which Dominique Sanda's character is chased through the snowy woods after her husband has been murdered, is echoed with mood, lighting and setting in the third-season episode of The Sopranos, "Pine Barrens" (2001), directed by Steve Buscemi.

Canadian artist Alex Colville was influenced by the same scene in The Conformist to paint his 1976 work In the Woods. Colville had both seen the film and read Moravia's 1951 novel.

In a 1995 interview, pop star Madonna listed it as one of her three favorite movies. In 2016, the Directors Guild of America ranked the film 66th on its list of The 80 Best-Directed Films since the Guild’s founding in 1936.
