= Vallecorsa =

- Comune
- Comune di Vallecorsa
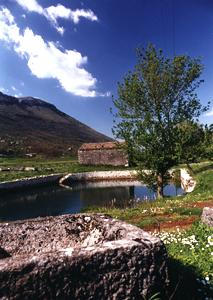
- Le Prata pits

- Location within Italy Location within Lazio
- Coordinates: 41°27′N 13°24′E
- Country: Italy
- Region: Lazio
- Province: Frosinone (FR)

Government
  - Mayor: Anelio Ferrracci

Area
  - Total: 39.28 km^{2} (15.17 sq mi)
- Elevation: 350 m (1,150 ft)

Population (30 November 2019)
  - Total: 2,524
  - Density: 64.26/km^{2} (166.4/sq mi)
- Demonym: Vallecorsani
- Time zone: UTC+1 (CET)
  - Summer (DST): UTC+2 (CEST)
- Postal code: 03020
- Dialing code: 0775
- Patron saint: St. Michael Archangel
- Saint day: 29 September
- Website: Official website

Vallecorsa is a comune (municipality) in the Province of Frosinone in the Italian region Lazio, located about 90 kilometres (56 mi) southeast of Rome and about 20 kilometres (12 mi) south of Frosinone, in the Monti Ausoni area.

Economy is based on olive production.

== History ==
The town is known as a fortified borough from around the 9th century AD. The ancient structure is the broken down castle, which was destroyed in a battle. The ancient castle is a boundary between the Papal States and the Kingdom of Naples.

== International relations ==
Vallecorsa is twinned with:

- Monte Sant'Angelo, Italy (since 2009)
