= Cardinal cloak =

18th century women's cloak

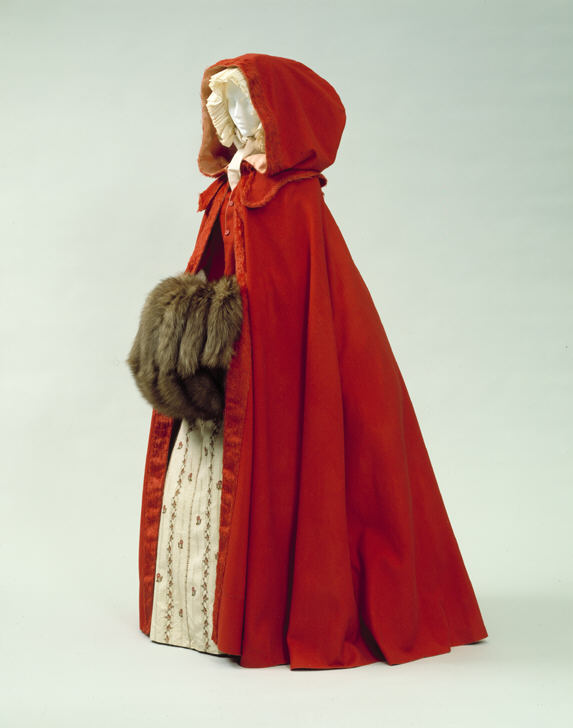
A cardinal cloak in the collection of the Costume Institute at The Met

A cardinal cloak is a style of women's cloak that was popular in the last third of the eighteenth century.

== Description ==
The cardinal cloak was made out of wool and featured a hood. The wool was typically so dense that the edge of the cloak could be left raw without fraying. The hood was often gathered so as not to crush the wearer's hairstyle.

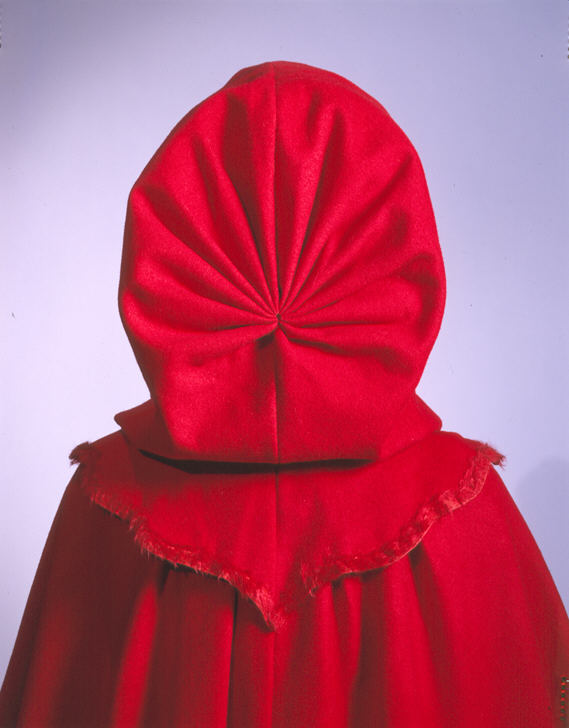
The gathered hood of a cardinal cloak.

The exact definition of the garment is uncertain because fashion terms of the day did not always have a fixed meaning. For example, the cardinal cloak is said to have taken its name from its cardinal red color but a 1762 runaway advertisement in the Pennsylvania Gazette mentioned a black silk cardinal cloak. The cardinal cloak is said to have been a variation on a capuchin, or monk's habit.

== History ==
In eighteenth-century England, cardinal cloaks along with straw hats and pattens were associated with the country lifestyle of the nascent landed gentry class. They subsequently became popular with women in colonial America. Following the rise of industrialization, the cloaks could be mass-produced. American women often imported these ready-made garments from England.

The cardinal cloak appears frequently in European and American historical accounts from roughly 1740 to 1840. In the last few decades of this time span, the cloak is mostly worn by older women.
