= Clog (British) =

Wooden soled footwear made in the United Kingdom

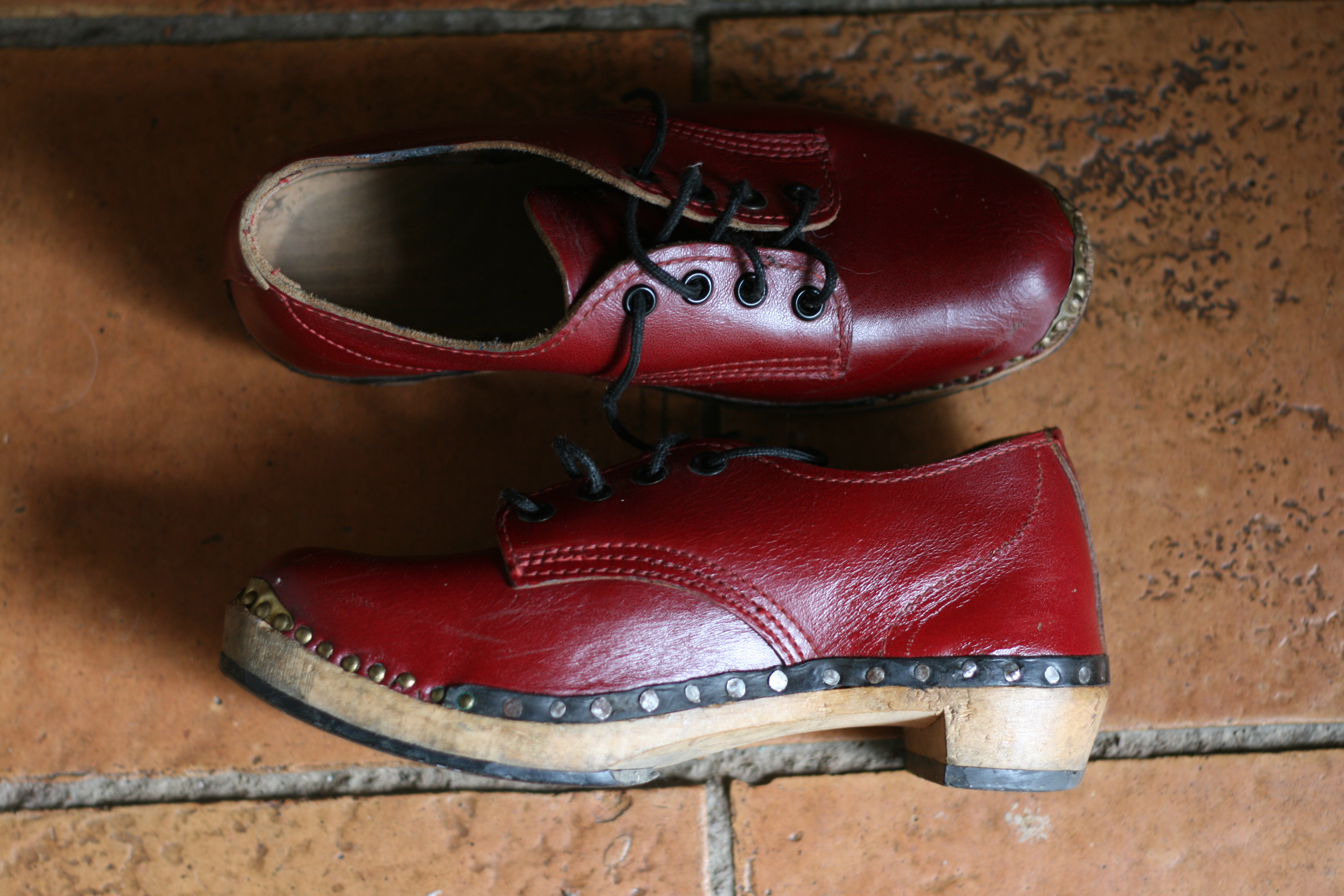
Traditional Gibson style English clogs made in Lancashire. Similar style clogs are made throughout the Kingdom. Note the plastic soling to protect the wood from wear.

A British clog is a wooden-soled clog from Great Britain. The uppers are typically leather, and many variations exist in style and fastening.

== History ==
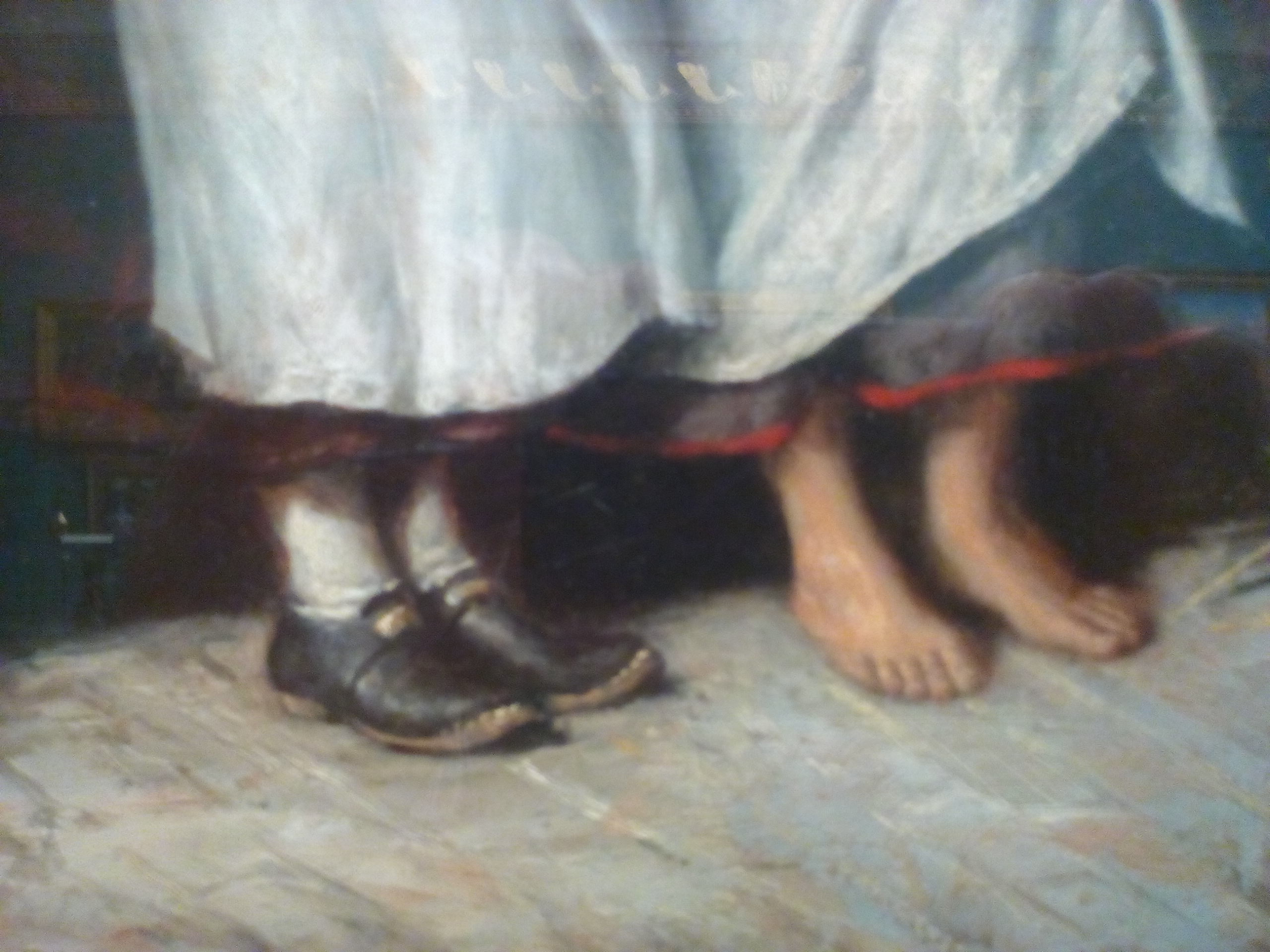
Lancashire mill girls in 1874 relaxing at lunchtime. Detail showing English style clogs worn on the left.

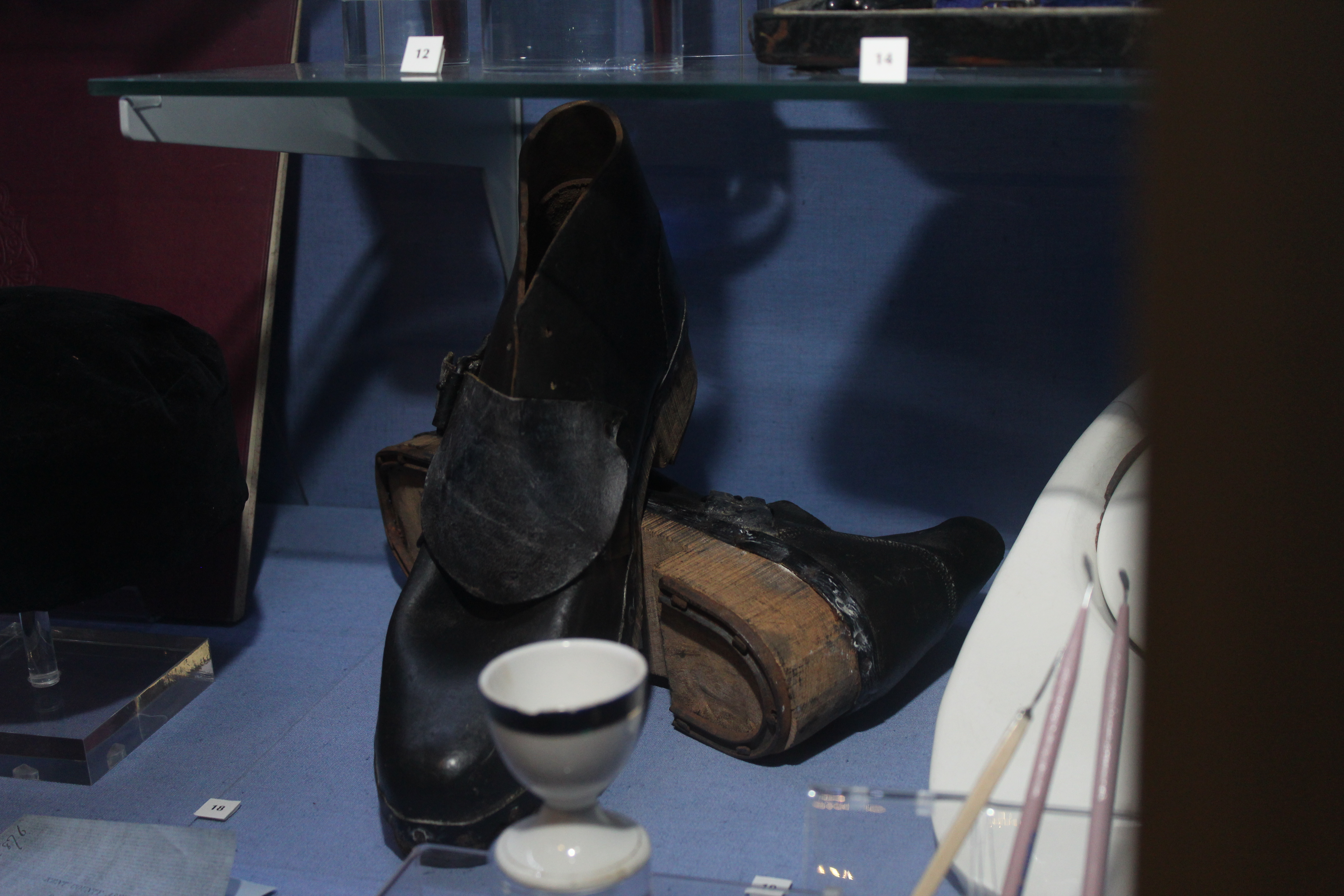
Clogs made by mental patients

There are two explanations of the development of the English style clog. They may have evolved from pattens which were slats of wood held in place by thonging or similar strapping. They were usually worn under leather or fabric shoes to raise the wearer's foot above the mud of the unmade road, not to mention commonly dumped human effluent and animal dung. Those too poor to afford shoes wore wood directly against the skin or hosiery, and thus the clog was developed, made of part leather and part wood. Alternatively they have been described as far back as Roman times, possibly earlier.

The wearing of clogs in Britain became more visible with the Industrial Revolution, when industrial workers needed strong, cheap footwear. Men and women wore laced and clasped clogs respectively, the fastening clasps being of engraved brass or more commonly steel. Nailed under the sole at toe and heel were clog irons, called calkers or cokers, generally 3/8" wide x 1/4" thick with a groove down the middle to protected the nail heads from wear. The heyday of the clog in Britain was between the 1840s and 1920s and, although traditionally associated with Lancashire, they were worn all over the country, not just in the industrial North of England. Indeed, Mark Clyndes of Walkleys says "More clogs were worn down south than in the northern industrial towns". The London fish docks, fruit markets and the mines of Kent being particularly noted. Clogs could be manufactured within hospitals to keep down the cost of clothing. Through manufacture, repair and wear clogs could become individually recognised. In the aftermath of disasters they could be a means of identifying the victims, as happened after the Clifton Hall Colliery disaster where at least two men could only be identified this way.

Clogs were sometimes handed out as part of poor relief; the Blackburn Weekly Telegraph recorded five people receiving "gifts of clogs or parcels of clothing" in 1912.

Although associated in the popular mind with dancing, clogs are still used in industry and are available tested to EN345. Such clogs are particularly advantageous in metal working industries where hot swarf or splashes of molten metal may be found on the floor. In 1989 three shiploads of clogs were sent to The Netherlands due to the perceived inferiority of the Dutch clog in wet fields. (Note: Handscomb quotes Mark Clyndes who bought Walkleys: "Three ship loads were dispatched to The Netherlands last year. Clogs are at their best in extremes of temperature or water and the all-wooden Dutch clog was clearly inferior to our own when used in wet fields because it leaked.")

== Construction ==
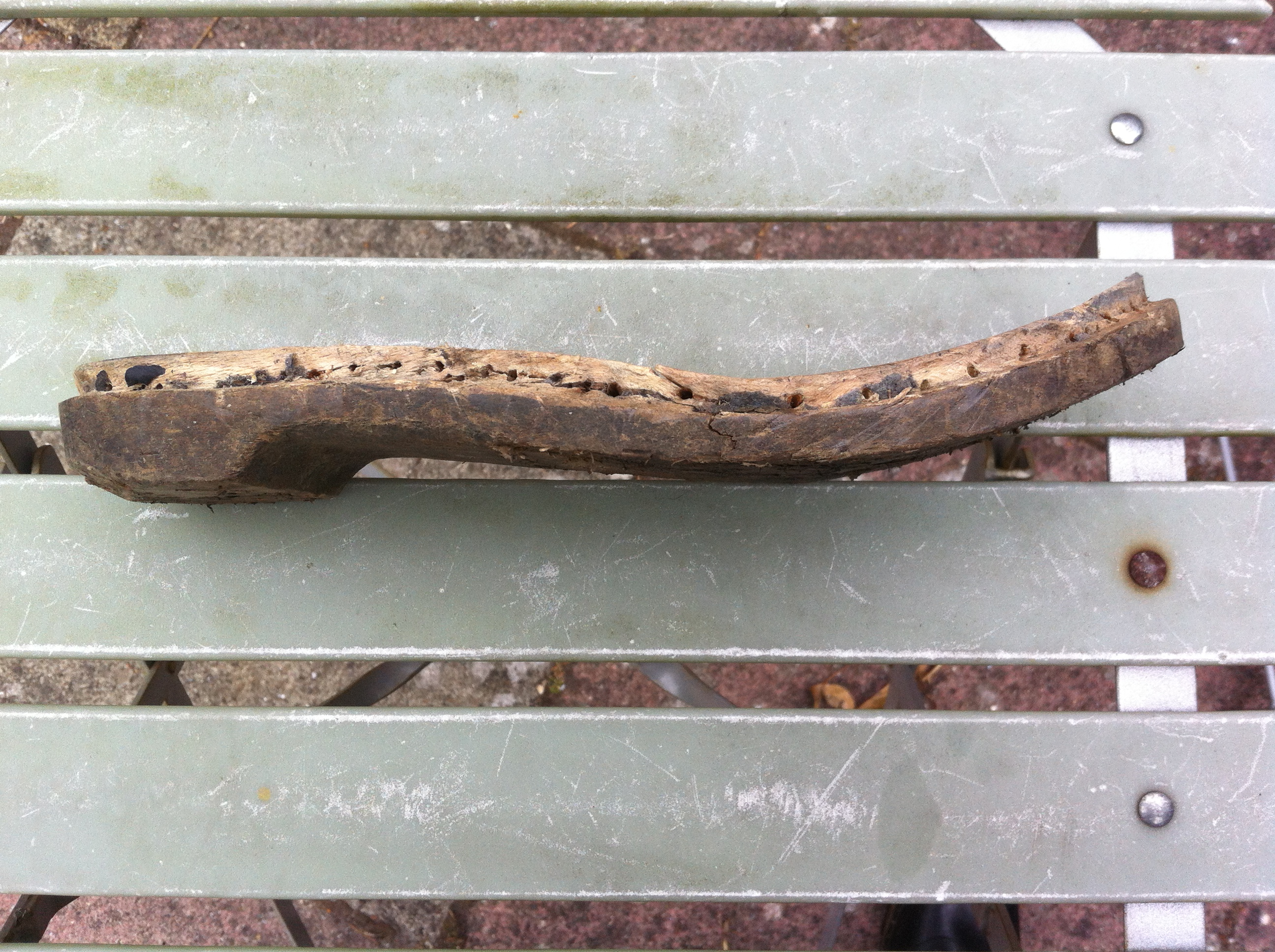
Sole of Gibson style English clog by Walkleys of Yorkshire. Note the cast at the toe and the rebate for the leather.

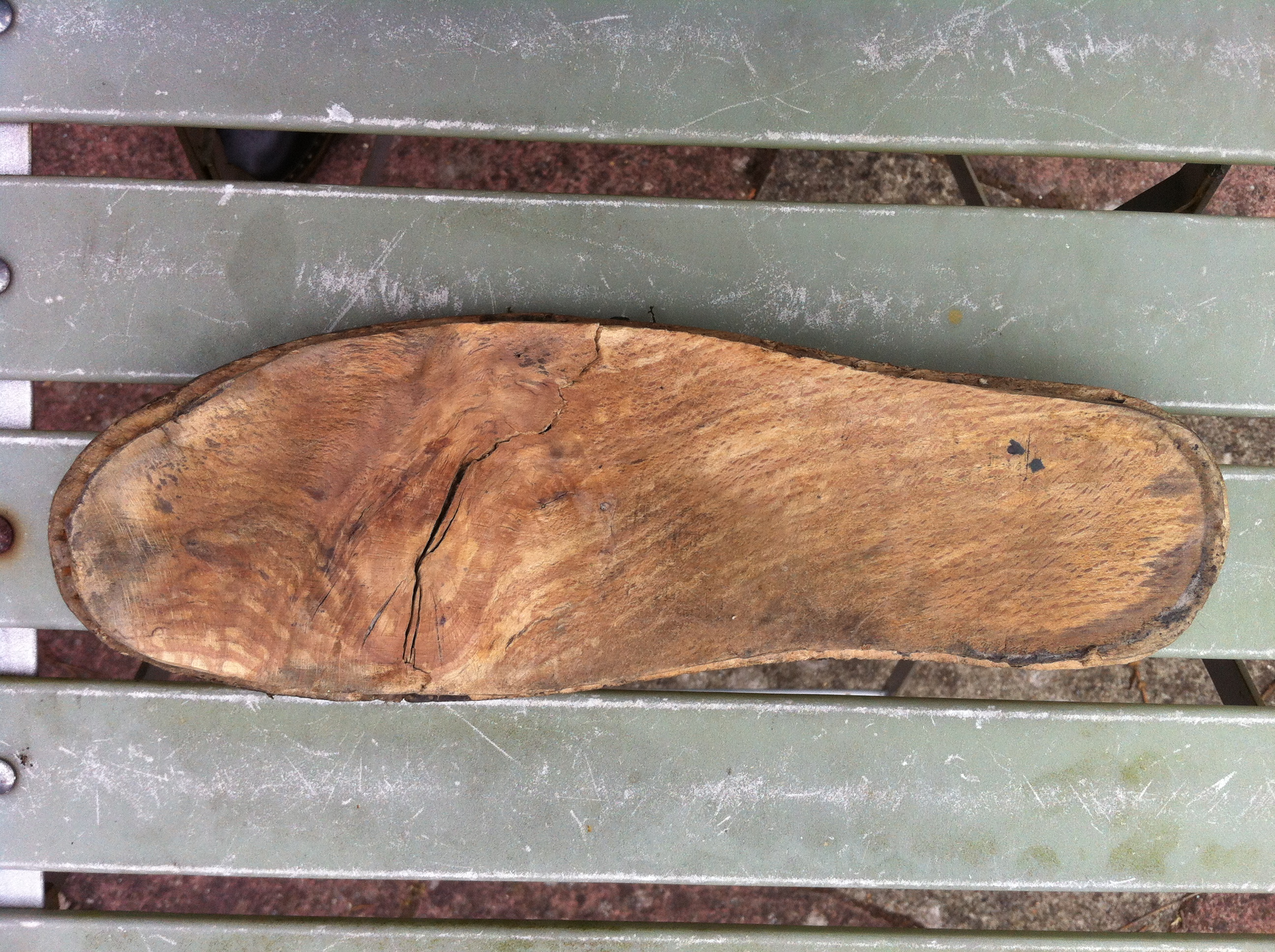
Sole of Gibson style English clog by Walkleys of Yorkshire.

In the past the English tended to employ Welsh and West Country alder, Scottish birch and Lincolnshire willow for the soles. The Welsh favoured alder, birch & sycamore. for their clog soles.

The traditional method of construction starts with gangs of itinerant woodsmen who would buy a stand of timber for the felling. The regular gangs would operate in a similar fashion to coppice workers and circulate around 12 stands in 12 years to allow regrowth. The timber was felled and sawn to length. Logs from larger trees were split; that from smaller coppice wood did not require splitting. The billets were roughly shaped with a stock knife and a deep notch put in where the sole and heel meet. (Note: A stock knife is a large, long handled knife with a hook at the far end. The hook is engaged into an eye in the work bench and allows the workman to exert great force when required.) All the work was done in green wood which is easier to work than seasoned wood. The clog blocks were then generally stacked up in open pyramids to allow the air to circulate and seasoned for a few months. The offcuts and waste was sold on, either as pea-sticks and firewood to provide money for food or else as fuel to the wool dyeing trade.

The seasoned wood was sold on to the master clogger who would finish the work on the now dry, seasoned wood. The same stock knives were used for shaping with two more pivot knives, the hollower and the gripper bit. The latter is used to cut the rebate to hold the upper. The final operation is to finish the sole perfectly smooth by rasps and short bladed knives.

Grew & Neergaard surmise that a similar method was used in medieval times, in part from an illustration in the Mendel Housebook. A workman is shown using a small hand adze for finishing pattens with drawknives (or possibly stock knives) hanging on the wall behind.

The uppers are made from leather either cut according to patterns or stamped out. At the lighter end are various styles of sandals, then through shoe types to industrial, farming and army boots. When cutting either card or metal patterns are used, with the latter the knife makes a clicking sound and the term used is "clicking out". The vamp and the quarters and heel stiffener are stitched together and eyelets or fastenings attached.

Traditionally using Indian Water Buffalo Waxed Kip the uppers were stretched over a solid straight last, using lasting pincers and the hot Half Round Bottom Glazer to heat and soften the leather, and once cooled and set to shape were transferred and tack lasted onto the soles. In the 20th century sprung lasts became used allowing whatever leather utilised to be tacked directly to the soles The junction is secured with brass or steel clog welt tacks nailed over narrow strip of leather (the welt). Most clogs are finished off with external brass or steel toe tins to protect the toe of the clog when kicking or kneeling. Those on the leather welt strip covering the join of leather and wood are called "inners" and those covering the wooden soles are "outers". Clogs could have either or both. The steel toecap used in safety clogs is generally fitted under the leather and is another item again.

Finally the soling is applied according to the customer's requirements. Clog-irons have been mentioned above, clogs are also shod (horse-shoe shaped rubber) or fully soled and heeled with rubber.

=== Woods ===
Alder was plentiful and cheap; the tree grows next to streams. The wood is easy to work by hand, but not durable in damp conditions. Like elm it needs to be fully immersed in water for it to be durable. It is quite light, and could be cut into a thick sole without adding too much weight. According to Grew and de Neergaard it is "resilient and extremely durable when wet, [and] has been the favourite material for clog-making in England right up to the present day". It was popular in the hot industries (steel making for example) because replacement woods could be quickly made, and it was rarely constantly damp. However being relatively soft, it makes a poor dance clog, where sound is important. Another disadvantage is that the wood has a tendency to split if taken from the centre of the tree. So much alder was used for clogs that in parts of Wales it was called Pren Clocsia (Clog Wood) rather than Gwern.

Beech is a good wood for machining, but suffers from being heavy and having a short grain. Modern machined-beech soles tend to be thinner with a shallower cast (the curve to the toe). This is not a problem for factory work, but is a disadvantage for dancing and hill walking. In the former case there is less spring and in the latter case the wearer tends to cantilever off the tip of the toe which gets worn quickly. Machine soles were generally of flatter profile, possibly so as to get more soles from a balk of timber. "I'd sell my Grandmother for a ha'penny a pair". They were comfortable when standing at machinery all day, indeed the safety toecap made only fits a shallower sole with less "cast".

Sycamore is light and hard with a longer grain than beech and wears well. It was the wood of choice in much of Pembrokeshire, where it was worked green. In a 1920s government survey of rural trades and crafts it was stated that the Welsh would pay double for Sycamore. However its use was unknown in many other parts of Wales. Sycamore can be worked wet without being seasoned as it is the most stable of woods, indeed it must be if the traditional carving tools are used, as it dries too hard to be commercially viable, possibly the reason it was little used.

Ash is considered by Tefor Owen to be the best wood for dance soles, but it does not wear as well as sycamore. If the clogs are only to be used on wooden floors he recommends it, otherwise the better-wearing properties of sycamore win out. Ash can have a tendency to delaminate along the growth rings when bruised.

Willow is another wood with good resistance to moist conditions. It can be tough and resilient. Lincolnshire willow found favour amongst English cloggers, and Willow was also favoured in the Trough of Bowland, but was never widely used in Wales. Which type of Willow was used is uncertain, and as there are many varieties of willow tree, this information is not particularly helpful. (In a parallel example, Sycamore is a Maple, but Field Maple has far less split resistance, and Norway Maple dries out about as heavy as Beech.)

Pattens Act 1416
- Act of Parliament
- Parliament of England
- Long title: No man shall make any pattens of aspe, upon pain of an hundred shillings.
- Citation: 4 Hen. 5. Stat. 2. c. 3
- Territorial extent: England and Wales; Ireland

Dates
- Royal assent: 18 November 1416
- Commencement: 19 October 1416 (Note: Start of session.)
- Repealed: England and Wales: 19 March 1604; Ireland: 10 August 1872

Other legislation
- Amended by: Pattens Act 1464
- Repealed by: England and Wales: Continuance, etc. of Laws Act 1603; Ireland: Statute Law (Ireland) Revision Act 1872
- Relates to: Continuance, etc. of Laws Act 1623; Statute Law Revision Act 1863

Status: Repealed

Text of statute as originally enacted

Pattens Act 1464
- Act of Parliament
- Parliament of England
- Long title: Patten-makers may make pattens of such asp as is not fit for shafts.
- Citation: 4 Edw. 4. c. 9
- Territorial extent: England and Wales; Ireland

Dates
- Royal assent: 28 March 1465
- Commencement: 21 January 1464 (Note: Start of session.)
- Repealed: England and Wales: 19 March 1604; Ireland: 10 August 1872

Other legislation
- Amends: Pattens Act 1416
- Repealed by: England and Wales: Continuance, etc. of Laws Act 1603; Ireland: Statute Law (Ireland) Revision Act 1872
- Relates to: Statute Law Revision Act 1863

Status: Repealed

Text of statute as originally enacted

Closely related to the willow (in the same family, Salicaceae) are the poplars, including the Aspen. The Aspen is used for French sabots. In medieval England this wood was specifically banned for patten making by the Pattens Act 1416 (4 Hen. 5 Stat. 2. c. 3) in order to preserve the stock for arrows. Anyone caught flouting the law was subject to a hundred shilling (£5) fine, half of which was paid to the Fletchers. After 1464 the Pattens Act 1464 (4 Edw. 4. c. 9) permitted the use of "such Timber of Asp, that is not apt, sufficient, nor convenient to be made into (arrowshafts)" because "Asp timber be the best and lightest Timber to make Pattens and Clogs". (Note: Petition by the patten-makers which led to the act.) This may have been due to its resistance to abrasion when used as a bare sole against the ground.

The 1416 and 1464 acts were extended to Ireland by Poynings' Law 1495 (10 Hen. 7. c. 22 (I)).

The 1416 act was repealed by the Continuance, etc. of Laws Act 1603 (1 Jas. 1. c. 25) and again by the Continuance, etc. of Laws Act 1623 (21 Jas. 1. c. 28).

The whole of 4 Hen. 5. Stat. 2 except the Confirmation of Charters and Statutes Act 1416 (4 Hen. 5. Stat. 2. c. 1) including the 1416 act (which had already been repealed), was repealed for England and Wales by section 1 of, and the schedule to, the Statute Law Revision Act 1863 (26 & 27 Vict. c. 125), which came into force on 28 July 1863.

The whole of 4 Edw. 4 except the Confirmation of Charters and Statutes Act 1416 (4 Hen. 5. Stat. 2. c. 1) including the 1416 act (which had already been repealed), was repealed for Ireland by section 1 of, and the schedule to, the Statute Law (Ireland) Revision Act 1872 (35 & 36 Vict. c. 98), which came into force on 10 August 1872.

=== Leather ===
Kip full grain leather was a Water Buffalo hide impregnated with tallow, oils and waxes; it was made in India. Split Kip was split leather and was often used just on the heel (the quarters). The presence of wax and oil made the leather hard, and necessitated a heated Half Round Bottom Glazer for shaping over the last. Kip lasts up to 40 years, but is no longer imported.

Crust-dyed chrome 2–4 mm thick is used by some makers.

Vegetable tan leather can be too stiff, insufficiently strong and not waterproof, although some European Veg Tan can be very supple and tough.

== Clog-dancing ==
Clog dancing should not be confused with Morris dancing, which may be performed in clogs.

There is a theory that clogging or clog dancing arose in these industrial textiles mills as a result of the mill workers entertaining themselves by syncopating foot taps with the rhythmic sounds made by the loom shuttles. Clog dancing became a widespread pastime during this period in England. During the nineteenth century, competitions were held, and professional clog dancers performed in the music halls.

Clog dancing is a continuing tradition in Wales. The difference between Welsh clogging and other step-dance traditions is that the performances do not only include complicated stepping, but also 'tricks' such as snuffing out a lit candle with the dancer's feet, toby stepping, which is similar to Cossack dancing, and high leaps into the air.

== Clog Fighting ('Purring') ==
Clog fighting (or shin-kicking), also known as 'purring', was a combative means of settling disputes in the mill towns of Lancashire. Clog fighting and its associated betting by spectators was illegal.

It is all up and down fighting here. They fought quite naked, excepting their clogs. When one has the other down on the ground he first endeavors to choke him by squeezing his throat, then he kicks him on the head with his clogs. Sometimes they are very severely injured.

== Trivia ==
The Cloggies

The Cloggies was a long running cartoon strip satirising Northerners. The cartoon popularised the existing use of cloggie to refer to people from the Northern industrial areas, particularly Lancashire.

To Pop his Clogs

The British expression "to pop his clogs" refers to a man dying. The most probably explanation is that if dead his clogs could be "popped" or pawned, though some sources allow for the possibility that "pop" may come from "to pop off" or "to pop off the hooks", both meaning to die.

== See also ==
- List of shoe styles
