= Worshipful Company of Pattenmakers =

Livery company of the City of London

- Motto: Recipiunt Fœminæ Sustentacula Nobis ("Women receive support from us")
- Date of formation: 1670; 355 years ago
- Order of precedence: 70th
- Master of company: David Miller
- Website: www.pattenmakers.co.uk

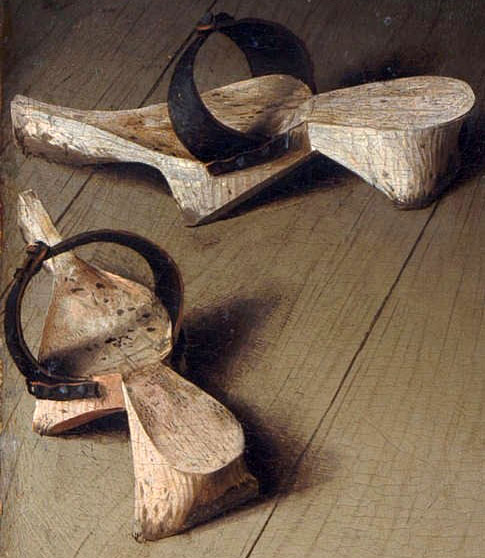
Arnolfini's painting of 1434, depicting pattens taken off inside a house.

The Worshipful Company of Pattenmakers is one of the Livery Companies of the City of London. The Pattenmakers, who were incorporated by royal charter in 1670 and granted livery status in 1717, were makers of wooden-soled overshoes. Pattens in previous times were helpful to pedestrians negotiating the muddy streets of London. However, with the advent of paved streets and rubber galoshes, pattens became obsolete by the end of the 19th century. Thus, the company's main function is now as a charitable body rather than a guild or trade association for pattenmakers.

The Pattenmakers' Company ranks seventieth in the order of precedence of City Livery Companies. Its motto is Recipiunt Fœminæ Sustentacula Nobis, Latin for "Women Receive Support From Us".

Since the 15th century, the Pattenmakers have been affiliated with St Margaret Pattens, a Wren church located in Eastcheap.
