= St Margaret Pattens =

Coordinates: 51°30′38.75″N 0°4′58.74″W

- Guild Church of Saint Margaret Pattens, Eastcheap
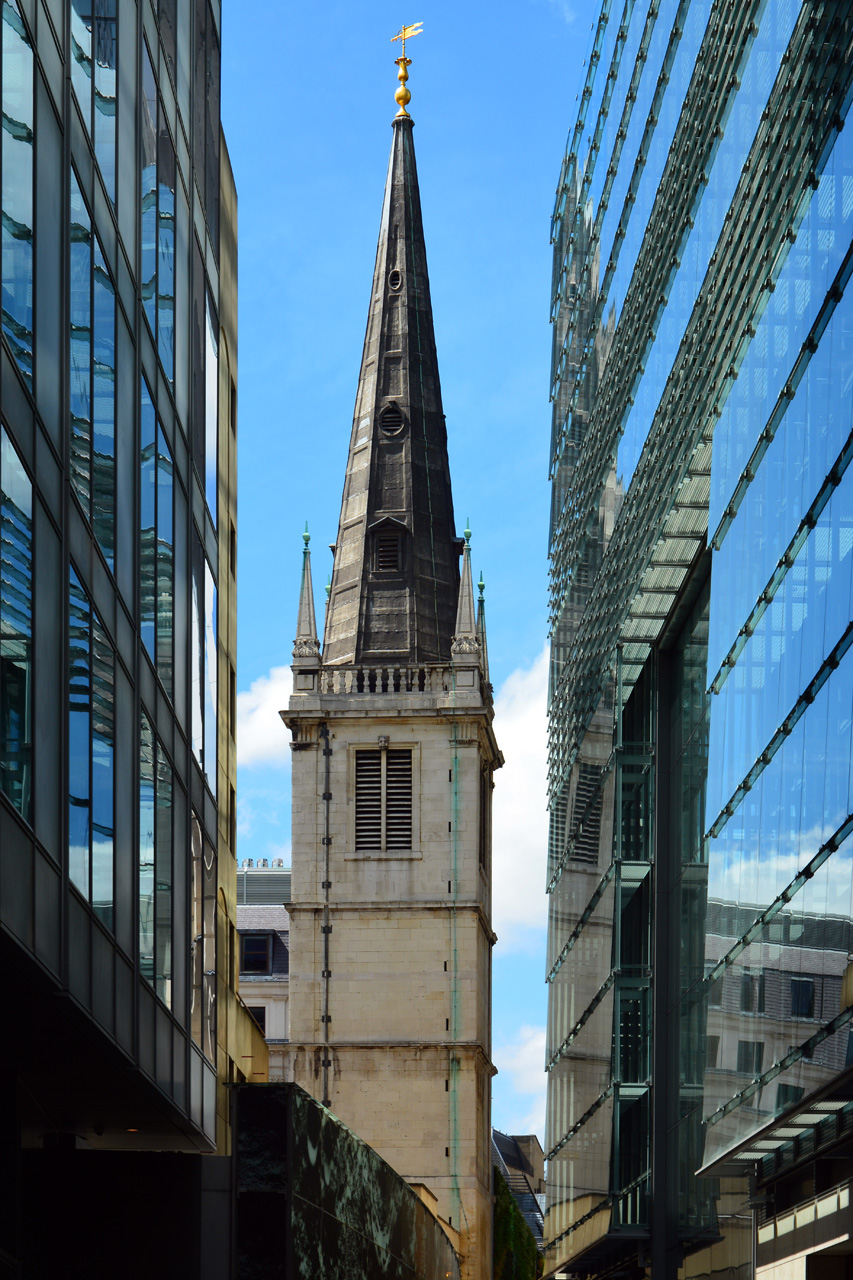
- View of the church from Plantation Lane

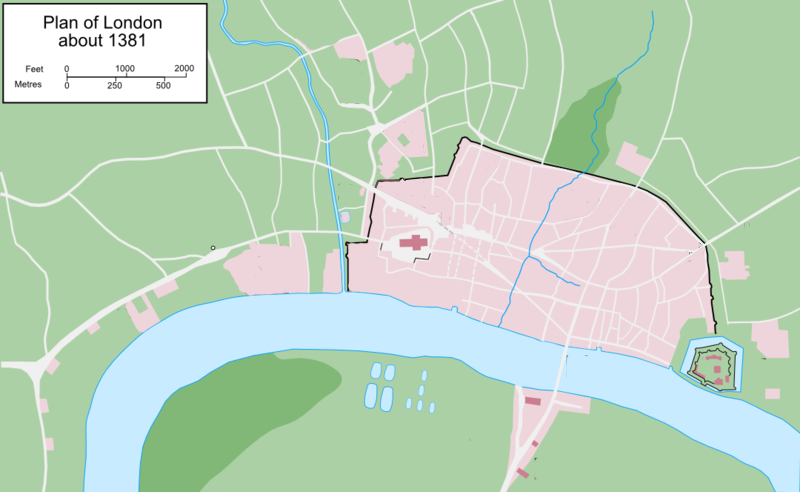
- Location within City of London Location within City of London in 1300
- Location: Rood Lane, Eastcheap, City of London, EC3
- Country: England
- Denomination: Church of England
- Previous denomination: Roman Catholic (to 1538)
- Website: stmargaretpattens.org

History
- Founded: Before 1067
- Dedication: Margaret of Antioch

Architecture
- Heritage designation: Grade I listed building
- Architect: Christopher Wren
- Style: English Baroque

Administration
- Diocese: London

Clergy
- Vicar: The Revd Andrew Keep

St Margaret Pattens is a Church of England church in the City of London, located on Eastcheap near the Monument. The dedication is to Saint Margaret of Antioch.

== History ==
The church was first recorded in 1067, at which time the church was probably built from wood. It was rebuilt in stone at some unknown subsequent date but fell into disrepair and had to be demolished in 1530. It was rebuilt in 1538 but was destroyed in the Great Fire of London in 1666. The present church was built by Sir Christopher Wren in 1687. It is one of only a few City churches to have escaped significant damage in the Second World War.

In 1954 St Margaret Pattens ceased to be a parish church and became one of the City’s guild churches, within the living of the Lord Chancellor and under the jurisdiction of the Bishop of London. They have a regular weekday, rather than Sunday congregation, drawn mostly from people who work in offices nearby. The tower accommodates the office of the Archdeacon of Hackney.

The church was designated a Grade I listed building on 4 January 1950.

== Building ==
The church's exterior is notable for its 200 feet (61 m) spire, Wren's third highest and the only one that he designed in a medieval style. This is sometimes referred to as Wren's only "true spire". The church’s interior is a simple rectangle with some unusual fittings – the only canopied pews in London, dating from the 17th century. These were intended for the churchwardens. The initials "CW" which appear in one of the pews have been thought to refer to Christopher Wren, but they may also signify "church warden." Other features in the interior include a punishment box carved with the Devil's head where wrongdoers had to sit during the church service.

== Name ==
The church's name is traditionally said to derive from pattens, wooden-soled overshoes, later soled with raised iron rings, that, as elsewhere, parishioners would be asked to remove on entering the church. These raised shoes enabled people to walk about the streets of London without muddying their feet. The church has certainly long been associated with their livery company, the Worshipful Company of Pattenmakers.

Another possibility is that the church's name actually commemorates a benefactor, possibly one Ranulf Patin, a canon at St Paul's Cathedral during the medieval period, although it would be most unusual for a benefactor to be commemorated in this way.

== Gallery ==
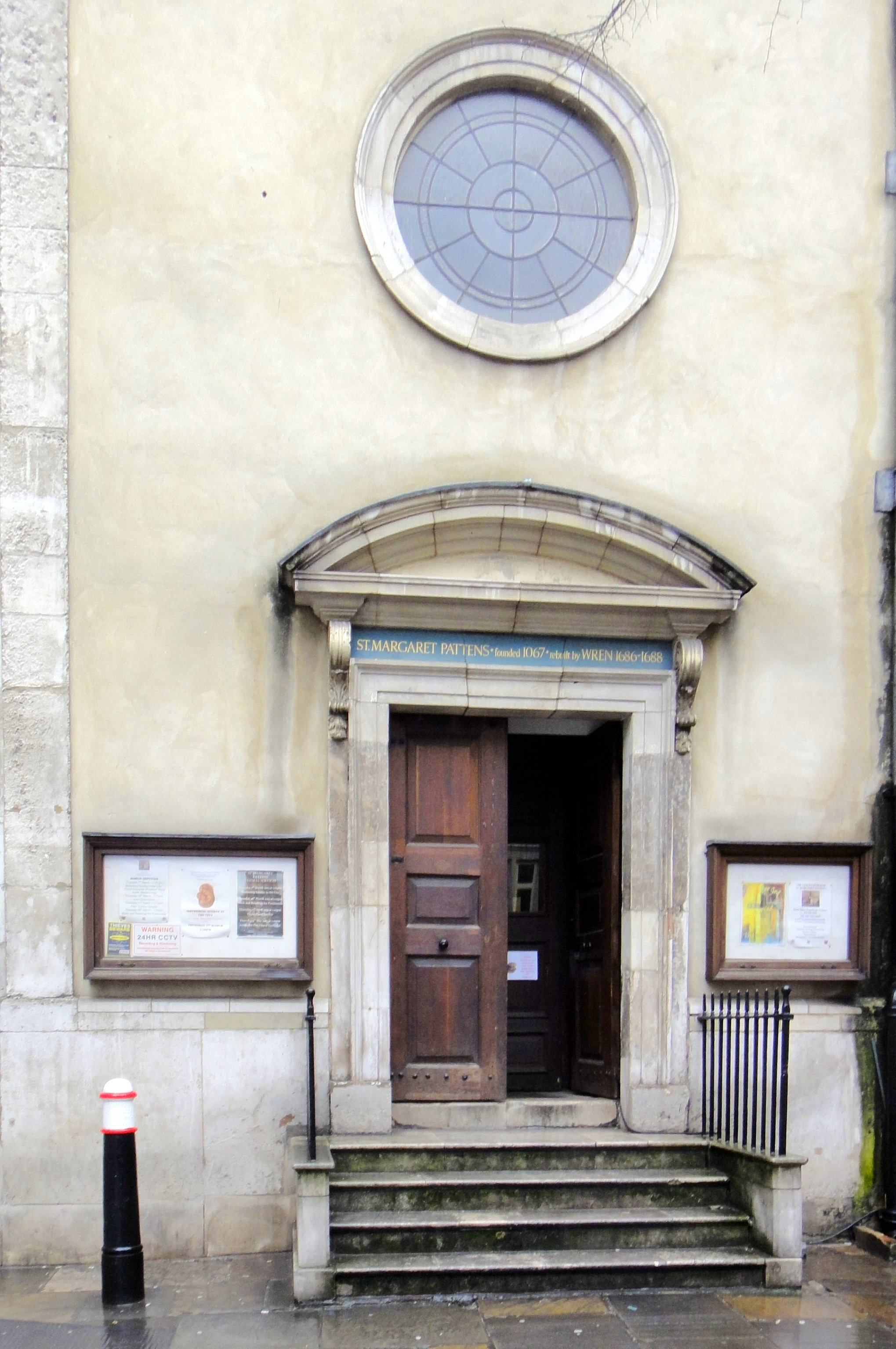
Entrance to the church

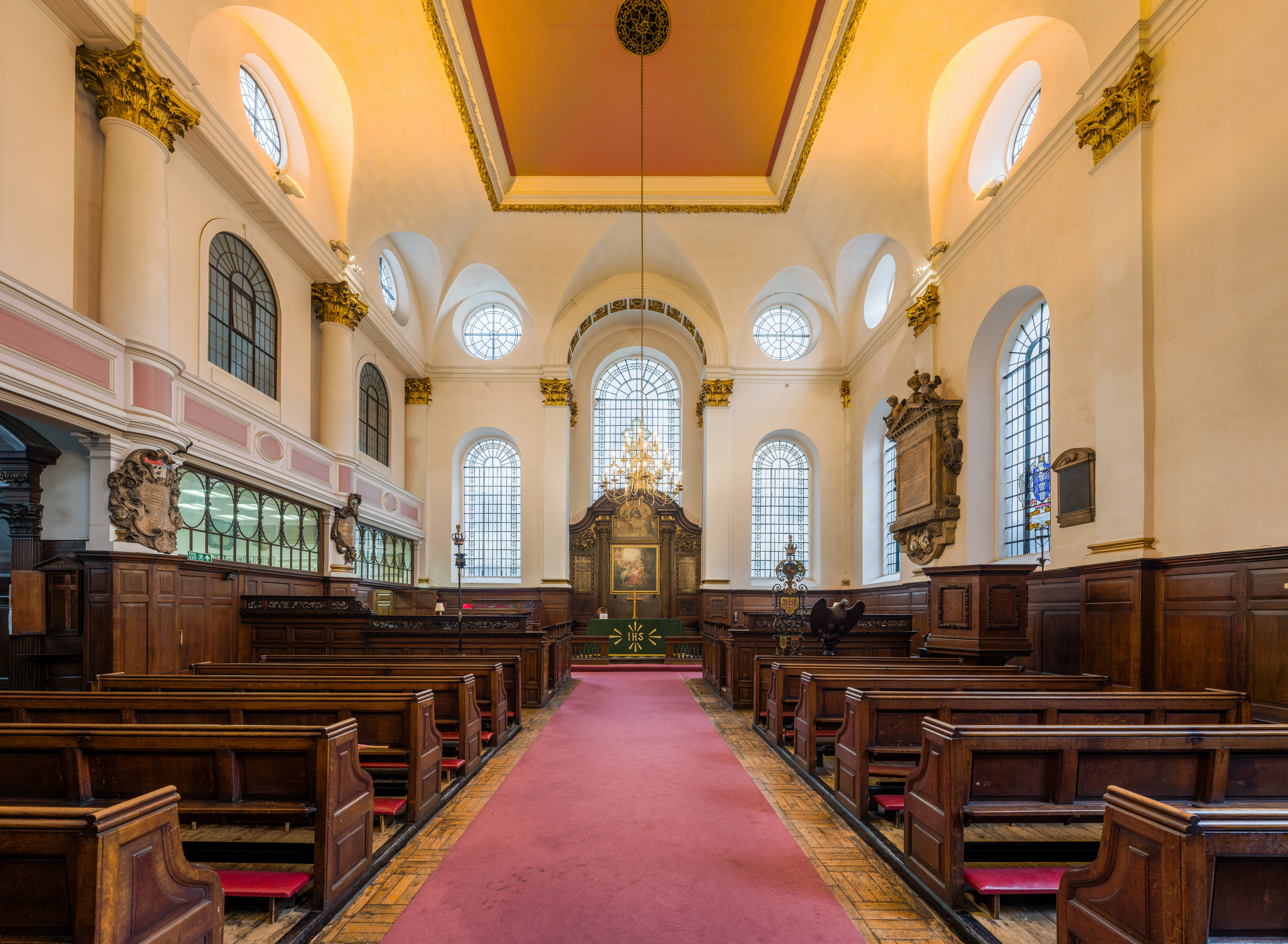
Looking east towards the altar

Looking west to the entrance and organ

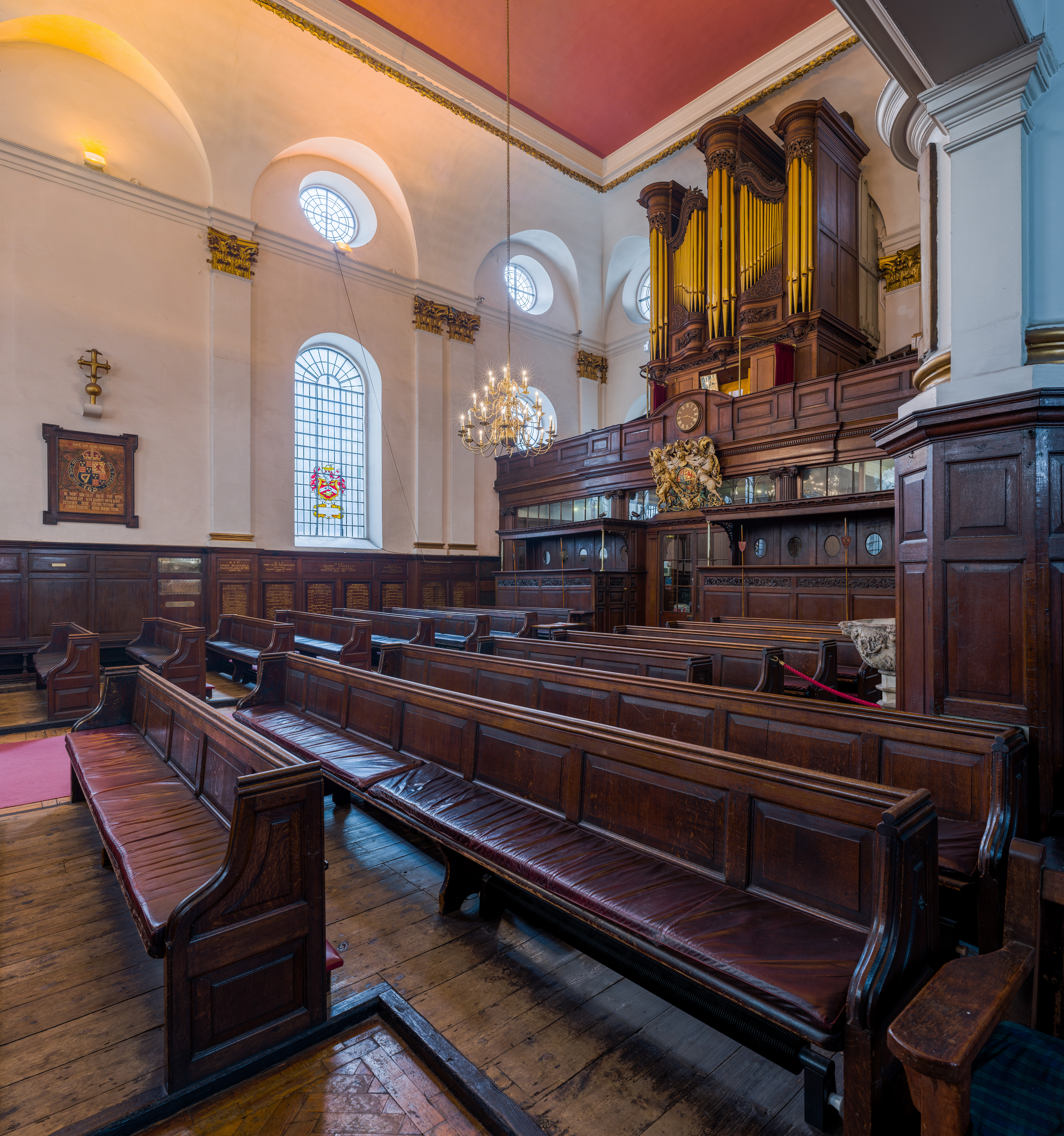
Looking diagonally across to the organ

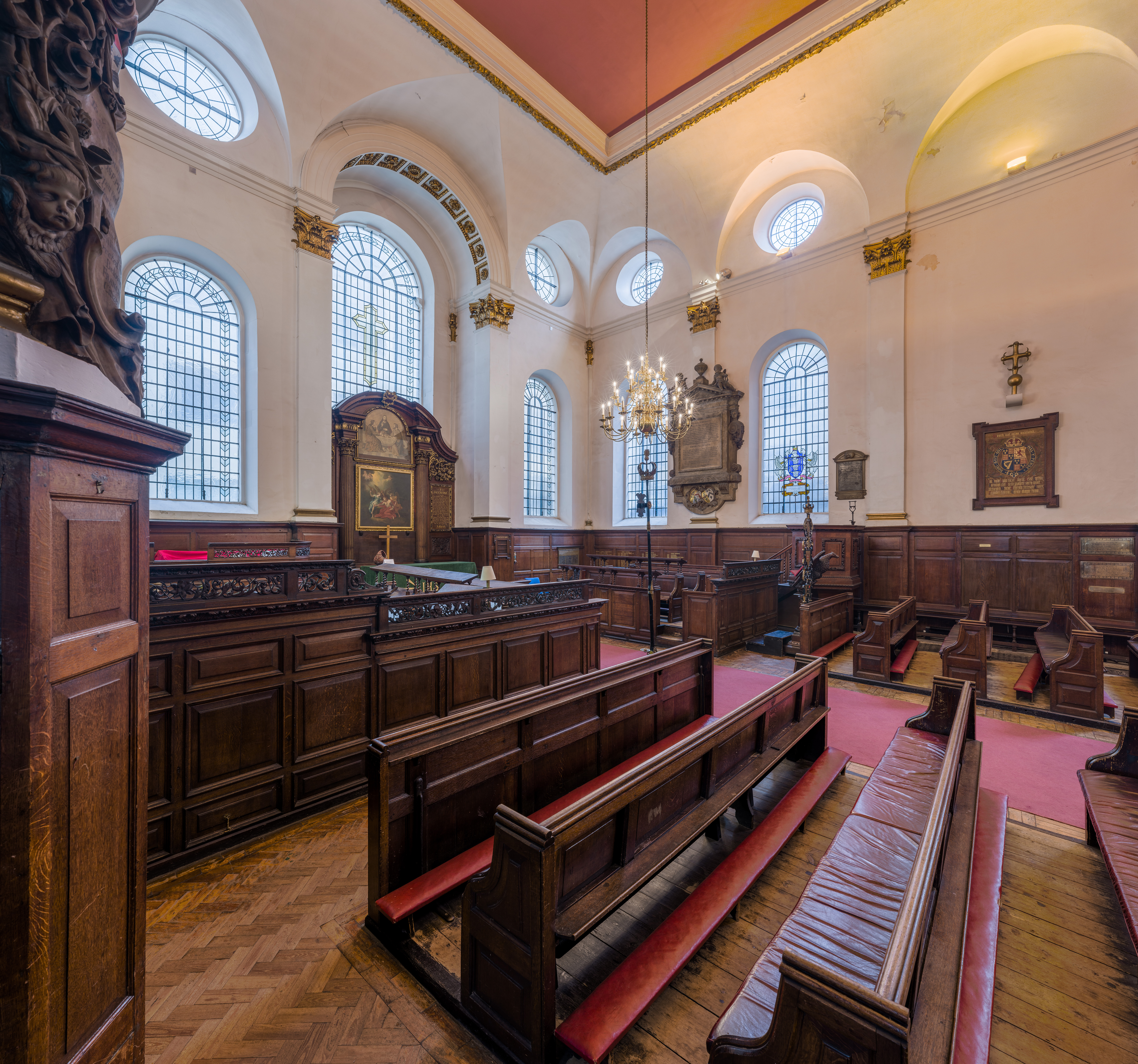
Looking diagonally across to the altar

== See also ==
- 30 Fenchurch Street
- Eastcheap
- List of churches and cathedrals of London
- List of Christopher Wren churches in London
