= Galoshes =

Type of rubber boot worn over shoes

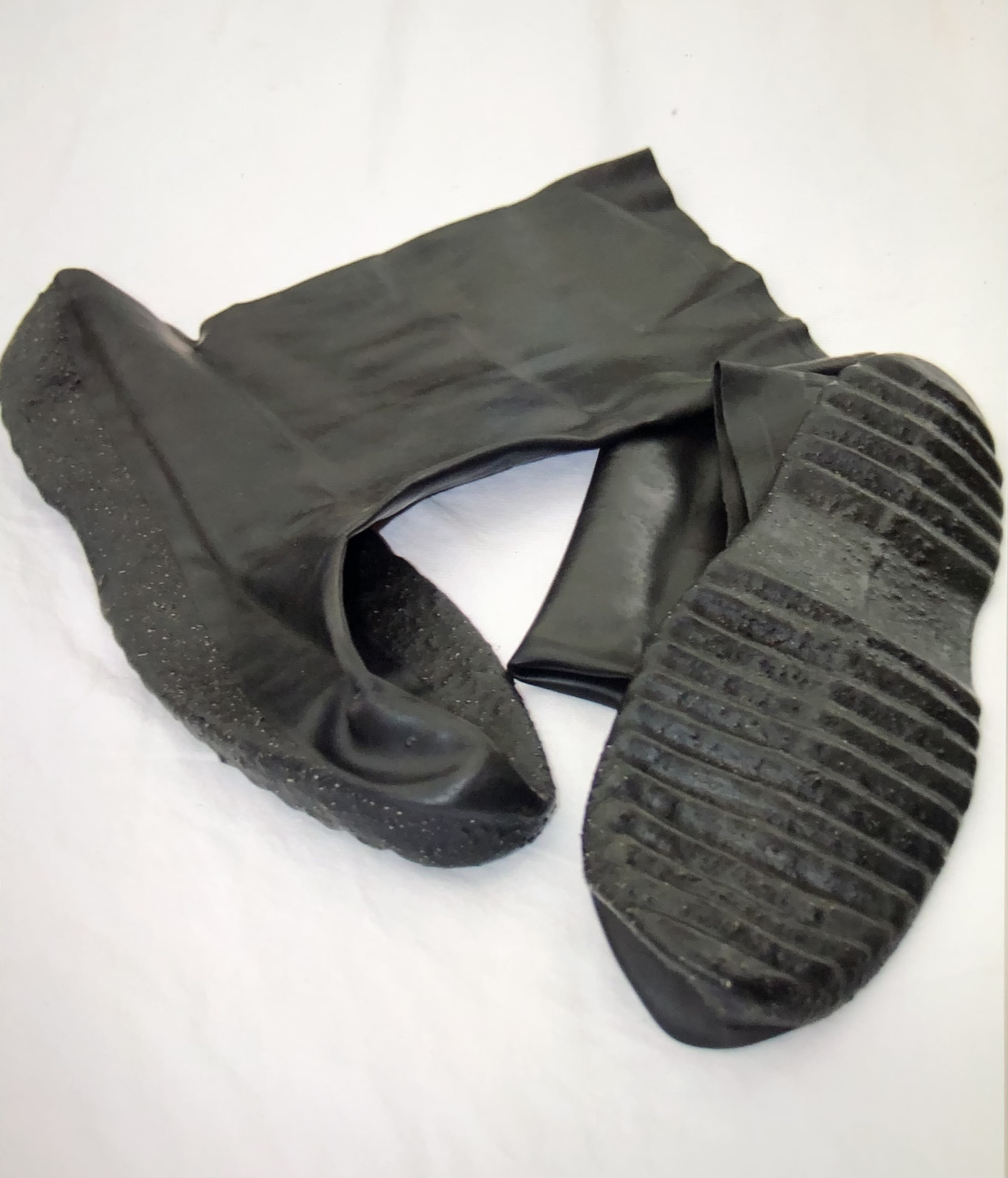
Slip-on galoshes

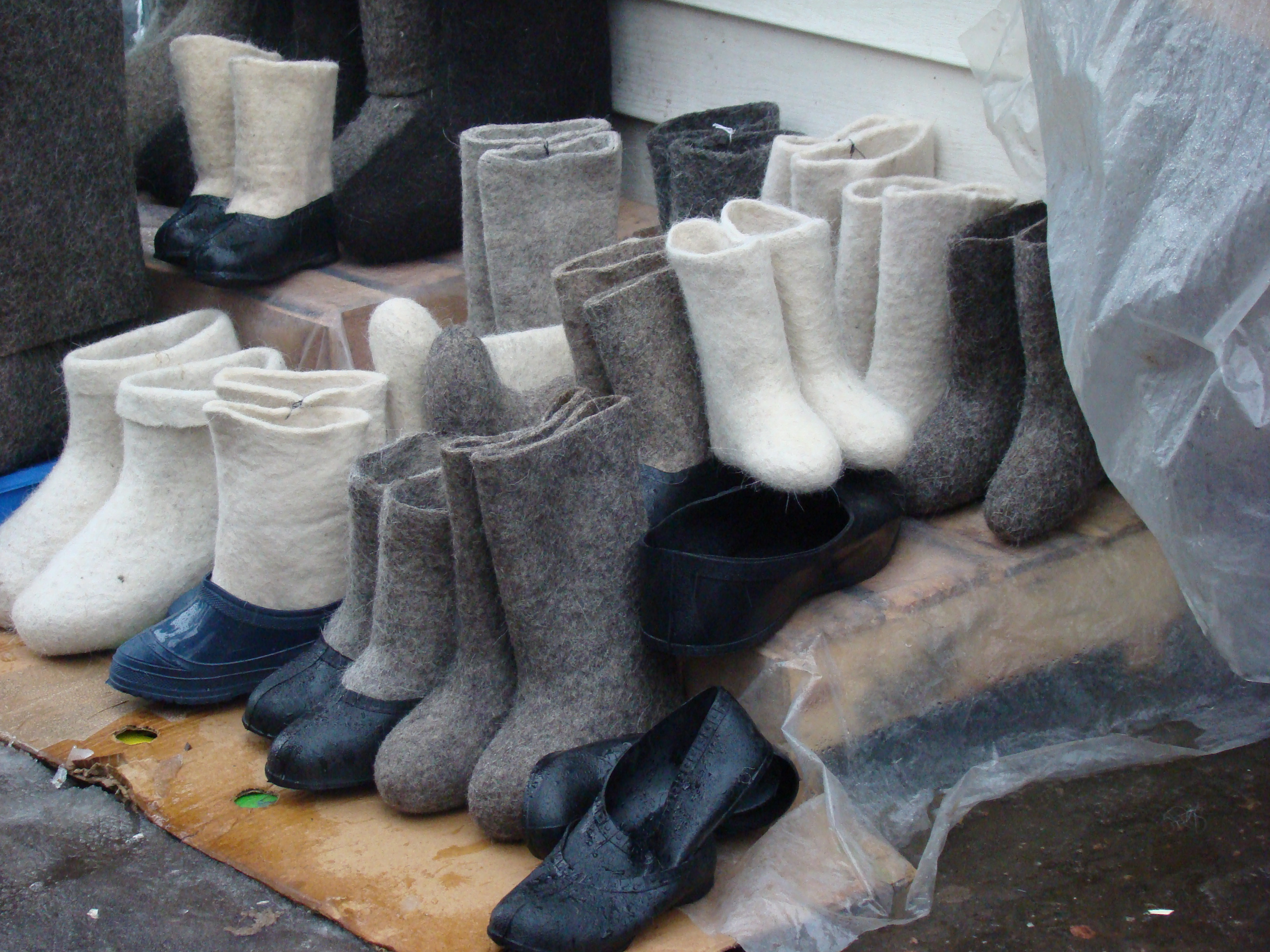
Russian-style galoshes for valenki

Galoshes are a type of overshoe or rubber boot that is put on over shoes to keep them from getting muddy or wet during inclement weather. They come in both low cut and high, and in both slip-on and buckle-front versions.

== Names ==
The English word galosh, golosh, etc., comes from French galoche from Medieval Latin galopia, a variant of Late Latin calopes and calopedes, a partial calque of Greek καλοπόδιον (kalopódion) from κᾶλον (kâlon) 'wood' and πούς (poús), 'foot'.

The calopedes of Late Antiquity were a kind of wooden clog and the name was occasionally reused in the Middle Ages for pattens, wooden bottoms strapped to softer shoes to allow outdoor use. By the 14th century, galosh was also being used to refer to English-style clogs, shoes with a wooden sole and a full fabric or leather upper and then to any shoe or boot generally, a meaning it still bears in Azorean Portuguese.

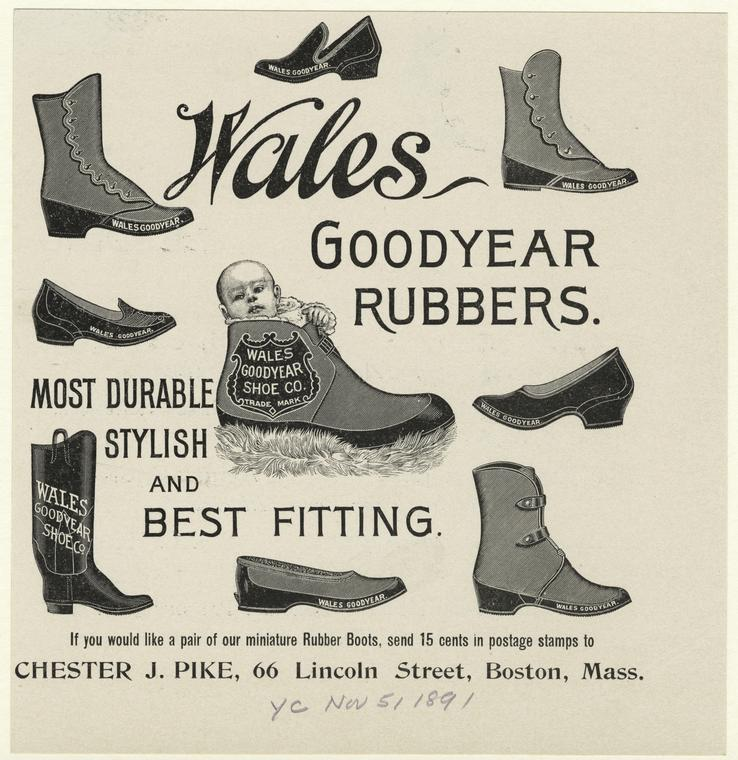
An ad for Goodyear rubbers

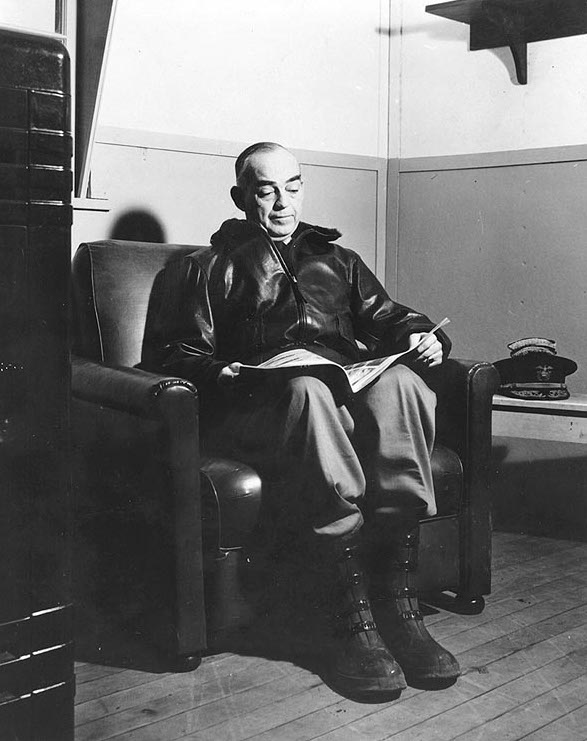
US Navy Vice Adm. Thomas C. Kinkaid wearing snow galoshes while stationed in the Aleutian Islands during World War II.

Galosh ultimately took on its present meaning from the patten usage, describing an overshoe worn at sea or in inclement weather. In time made from rubber, they gained the names rubbers, rubber boots, and gumshoes (from gum rubber, a term also applied to rubber-soled "street" shoes, crepe-soled shoes and boots, and sneakers). Today, flexible plastics such as PVC are often used.

Galoshes are overshoes, and not to be confused with the form of large slip-on rubber boots (known in the United Kingdom as Wellington boots or Wellies).

A protective layer (made variously of leather, rubber, or synthetic ripstop material) that only wraps around a shoe's upper is known as a spat or gaiter. Among bootmakers, a galosh is also a piece of welt-like leather that runs around the top of the sole between it and the uppers.

In Turkish contexts, galoş most often refers to smaller overshoes that are worn indoors to keep from tracking mud or dirt onto the floor.

== History ==
The transition from a traditional wooden sole galosh to one of vulcanized rubber may be attributed to Charles Goodyear and Leverett Candee. The qualities of rubber, though fascinating to Goodyear, were highly dependent on temperature: it was tacky when hot, brittle when cold. Vulcanization of rubber tempered its properties so that it was easily molded, durable, and tough. A rubberized elastic webbing made Goodyear's galoshes (c. 1890) easy to pull on and off. Beginning in the early 20th century, galoshes were almost universally made of rubber. Overshoes have evolved in the past decades and now are being made of more advanced materials with new features, such as high traction outsoles.

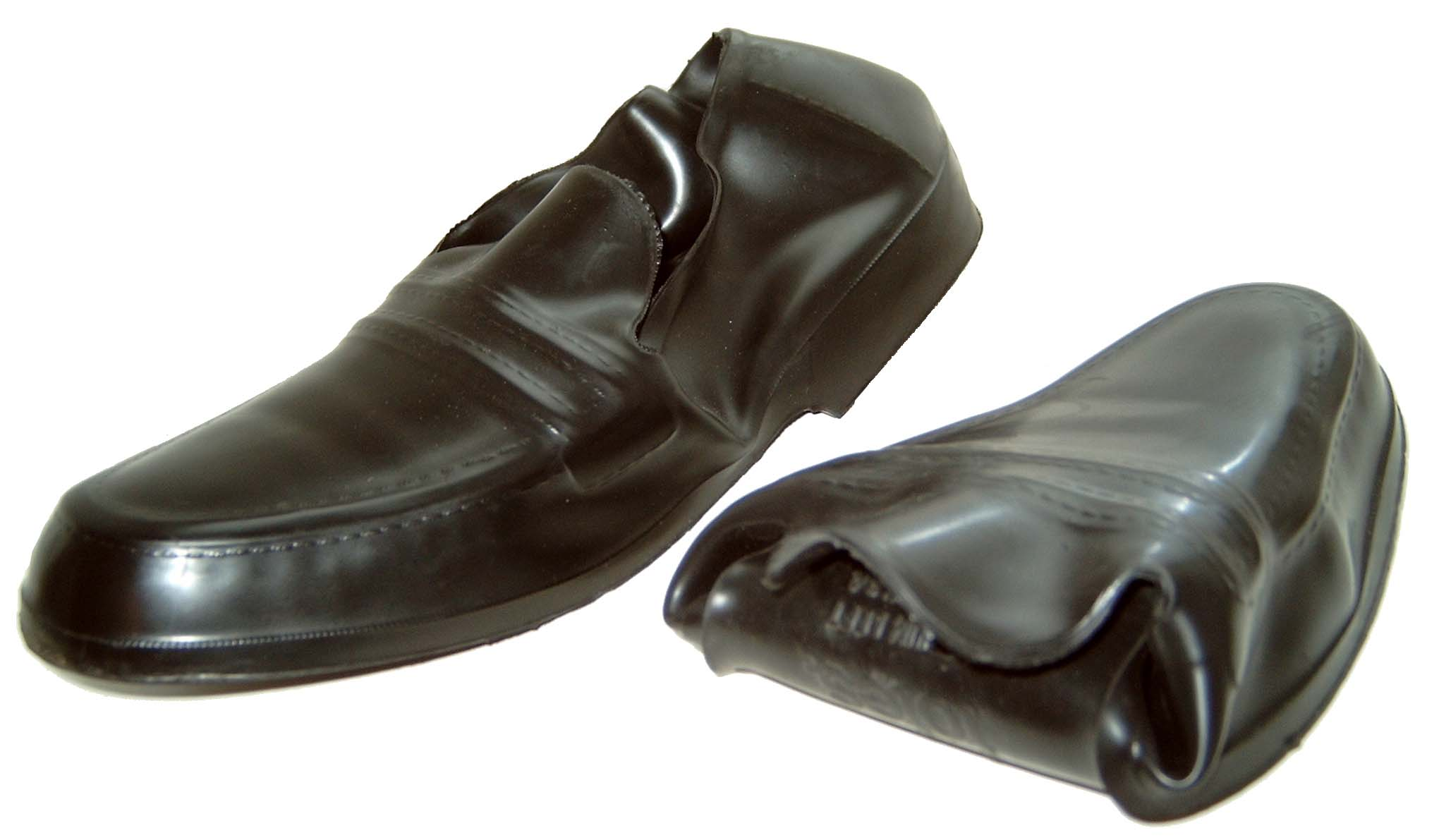
Slipper-style galoshes

== See also ==
- List of boots
- List of shoe styles
