= Stock knife =

A stock knife is a large, straight bladed long handled knife with a hook at the far end. The hook is engaged into an eye in the workbench and allows the workman to exert great force when required. The knife back and handle were made of wrought iron to give flexible strength, while the blade had a thin sheet of blister steel on the top side to give a razor sharp edge. It was used solely in the production of clog soles. The Carter family at High Burton had a virtual monopoly, almost all surviving blades are stamped Henry Carter, though other family members also left their mark. The stock knife is distinguished from other such knives, for instance pegging knives, in that the blade chamfer is on the underside in order to achieve concave cuts. It is also notable for having the smallest gap between blade and hook to facilitate carving the clog heel. Stock knives used by the block cutting gangs, who carved rough cut crude blocks to be finished in clogmaking shops, often had a few more inches of offset set into the handle arm.
