= Patten (shoe) =

Protective wooden overshoe

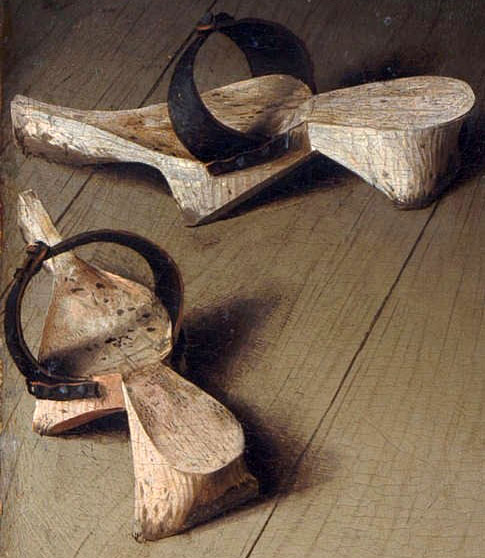
In this detail of the Arnolfini Portrait of 1434, these pattens have been taken off inside the house.

Pattens, also known by other names, are protective overshoes that were worn in Europe from the Middle Ages until the early 20th century. In appearance, they sometimes resembled contemporary clogs or sandals. Pattens were worn outdoors over a normal shoe, had a wooden or later wood and metal sole, and were held in place by leather or cloth bands. Pattens functioned to elevate the foot above the ground, to protect leather shoes from water, snow or mud. Women continued to wear pattens in muddy conditions until the 19th or even early 20th century.

== Names ==
The word patten probably derives from the Old French patte meaning hoof or paw. It was also spelled patyn and in other ways. Historically, pattens were sometimes used to protect hose without an intervening pair of footwear and thus the name was sometimes extended to similar shoes like clogs. In modern use, however, the term is properly restricted to overshoes. In fact, medieval English also used the terms clogs and galoshes alongside pattens but, if there were subtle differences intended, that is no longer clear and all medieval and early modern overshoes are now usually referred to as pattens for convenience.

== Medieval period ==
During the Middle Ages, pattens were worn outdoors, and in public places, over (outside of) the thin soled shoes of that era. Pattens were worn by both men and women during the Middle Ages, and are especially seen in art from the 15th century; a time when poulaines—shoes with very long, pointed toes—were particularly in fashion.

=== Types ===
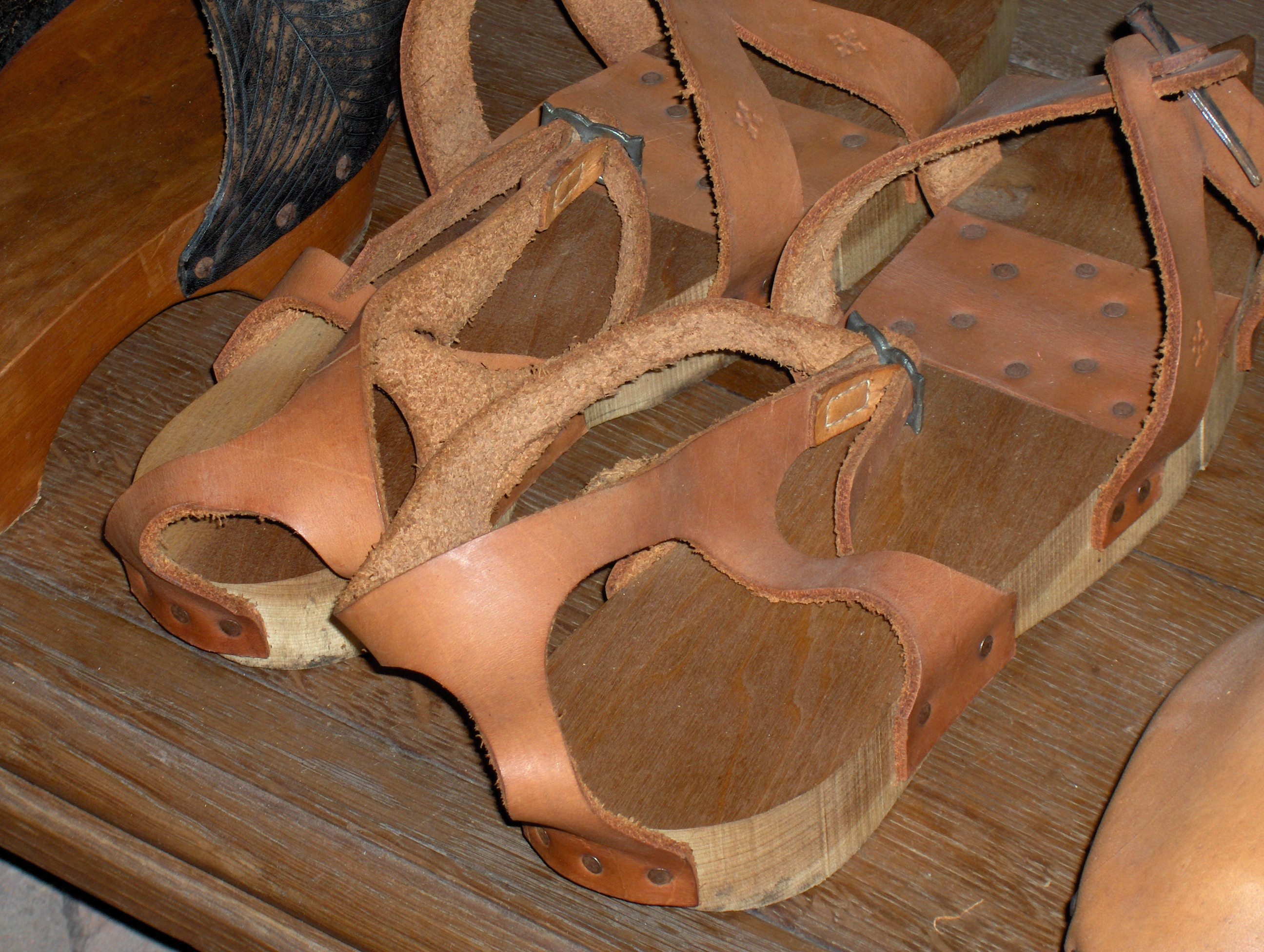
Hinged sole

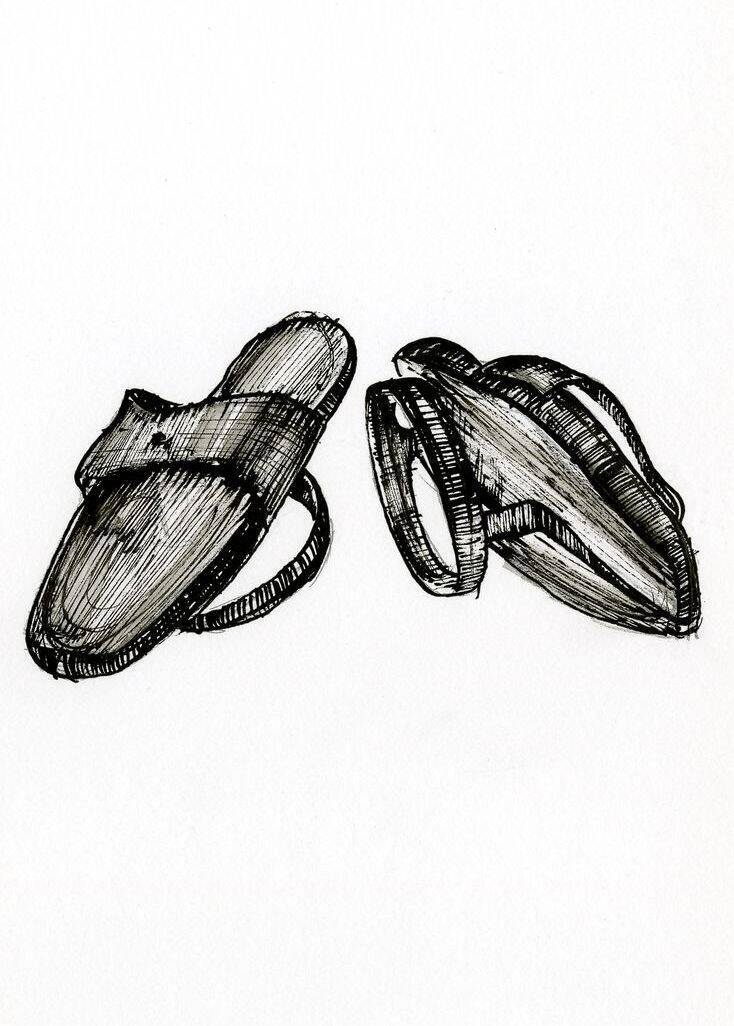
Raised on iron rings

There were three main types of pattens. One of these types had a wooden 'platform' sole raised from the ground, either with wooden wedges or iron stands. A second variant had a flat wooden sole, often hinged. The third type had a flat sole made from stacked layers of leather. Some later European varieties of these pattens had a laminated sole; light wooden inner sections with leather above and below.

In earlier varieties of pattens, dating from the 12th century on, the stilt or wedge variety were more common. From the late 14th century, the flat variety became increasingly common. Leather pattens became fashionable in the 14th and 15th centuries, and in London, appear to have begun to be worn as shoes over hose in the 15th century, spreading to a much wider section of the public. Most London patten soles were constructed of alder, willow, or poplar wood.

In 1390, the Diocese of York forbade clergy from wearing pattens and clogs in both church and processions, considering them to be indecorous—contra honestatem ecclesiae. Conversely, the famous rabbi Shlomo ibn Aderet (the Rashba, c. 1233 – c. 1310) of Aragon was asked if it was permissible to wear patines on Shabbat, to which he replied that it was the custom of "all the wise in the land" to wear them, and was certainly permitted.

Since shoes of the period had thin soles, pattens were commonly used to distance the shoes and feet from puddles of water, snow, or - when worn indoors - from cold stone floors. Contrary to popular belief, there was no widespread problem with refuse on city streets, since sanitary measures were commonplace. However, pattens would have been effective protection from horse droppings and the like. To serve these functions, pattens tended to only make contact with the ground through two or three strips of wood and raised the wearer up considerably, sometimes by four inches (ten centimetres) or more, in contrast to clogs, which usually have a low, flat-bottomed sole integral to the shoe.

== Early Modern period ==
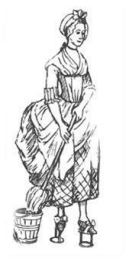
A maid wearing circle-type pattens: Piety in Pattens or Timbertoe on Tiptoe, England 1773

A later pattern of patten which seems to date from the 17th century, and then became the most common, had a flat metal ring which made contact with the ground, attached to a metal plate nailed into the wooden sole via connecting metal, often creating a platform of several inches (more than 7 centimetres). By this time men's shoes had thicker soles and the wealthier males (the gentry or gentlemen) commonly wore high riding boots, thus pattens seem only to have been worn by women and working-class men in outdoor occupations. Since dress hems extended down to the feet for most of this period, it was necessary to raise the hem above the ground to keep the dress clean even in well-swept and paved streets. The motto of the London Worshipful Company of Pattenmakers, the former representative guild for this trade, was and remains: Recipiunt Fœminæ Sustentacula Nobis, Latin for Women Receive Support From Us. The 19th-century invention of cheap rubber galoshes gradually displaced the patten, as did the more widespread use of urban paving, especially elevated, paved pathways only for pedestrians—the now ubiquitous pavements (sidewalk in American English)—or hard road surfaces.

=== Etiquette and practicality ===
Wearing of pattens inside church was discouraged, if not outright forbidden: perhaps because of the noise they made, the oft-commented "clink" being the consensus term for the sound; Jane Austen wrote of the "ceaseless clink of pattens" referring to life in Bath. To talk excessively and too loudly was coined to be as if one: "had your "tongue run (or go) on pattens", used by Shakespeare and others. In houses, pattens were taken off with hats (for men) and overcoats upon entering, not doing so being considered rude and inconsiderate by bringing dirt inside—literally a faux pas or wrong step. The aunt of the Brontë Sisters, Miss Branwell, seems to have been considered notably eccentric for wearing her pattens indoors:

she disliked many of the customs of the place, and particularly dreaded the cold damp arising from the flag floors in the passages and parlours of Haworth Parsonage. The stairs, too, I believe, are made of stone; and no wonder, when stone quarries are near, and trees are far to seek. I have heard that Miss Branwell always went about the house in pattens, clicking up and down the stairs, from her dread of catching cold.

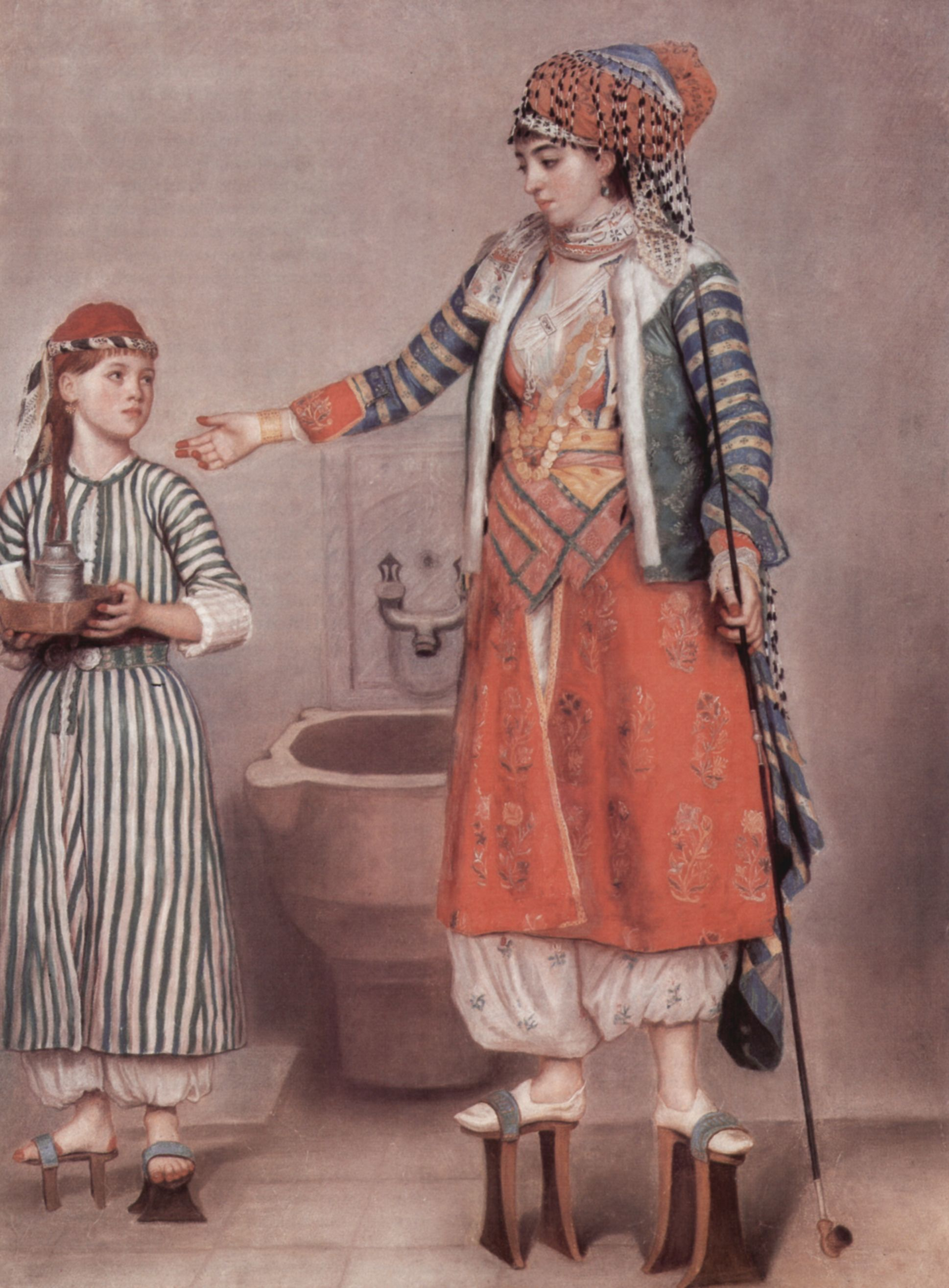
Tall pattens worn by two 18th-century Turkish women, pastel by Jean-Étienne Liotard, who visited Turkey in 1738

Pattens were not always easy to walk in, and despite their practical intention, literary evidence suggests that they could appear, at least to males, as a further aspect of feminine frailty and dependency. Samuel Pepys recorded in his diary for 24 January 1660:

Called on my wife and took her to Mrs Pierce's, she in the way being exceedingly troubled with a pair of new pattens, and I vexed to go so slow.

From the Middle Period Poems of John Clare (1820s):

She lost her pattens in the muck
& Roger in his mind
Considered her misfortune luck
To show her he was kind
He over hitops fetched it out
& cleaned it for her foot...

("hitops" are high boots)

From Thomas Hardy's The Woodlanders of 1887, though set earlier in the century:

he saw before him the trim figure of a young woman in pattens, journeying with that steadfast concentration which means purpose and not pleasure. He was soon near enough to see that she was Marty South. Click, click, click went the pattens; and she did not turn her head.

She had, however, become aware before this that the driver of the approaching gig was Giles. She had shrunk from being overtaken by him thus; but as it was inevitable, she had braced herself up for his inspection by closing her lips so as to make her mouth quite unemotional, and by throwing an additional firmness into her tread.

"Why do you wear pattens, Marty? The turnpike is clean enough, although the lanes are muddy."

"They save my boots."

"But twelve miles in pattens—'twill twist your feet off. Come, get up and ride with me."

She hesitated, removed her pattens, knocked the gravel out of them against the wheel, and mounted in front of the nodding specimen apple-tree.

== Other uses of the term ==
The word could also be used as a term for a wooden soled shoe, that is a chopine or clog, as opposed to an overshoe, until at least the nineteenth century. The word was also used for the traditional wooden outdoor shoes of Japan and other Asian countries. What are in effect snowshoes for mud, as used by wildfowlers, boatmen, and Coast Guards may also be called pattens, or "mud-pattens". These are shaped boards attached to the sole of a shoe, which extend sideways well beyond the shape of the foot, and therefore are a different sort of footwear from the patten discussed here. "Horse-pattens" were used on horses, especially for ploughing muddy fields. The word was also used for ice-skates, as it is in French (patiner, to skate).

== The Worshipful Company of Pattenmakers ==
In London, the Worshipful Company of Pattenmakers remains the Livery Company, formerly guild of the Patten-makers, or Patteners, and their adopted church remains St Margaret Pattens. The first record of the guild dates to 1379, and there was still a pattenmaker listed in a London Trade Directory in the 1920s. A notice, probably 18th century, in the Guild Church still requests ladies to remove their pattens on entering; other English churches have similar signs, and in one case, a board with pegs for ladies to hang them on.

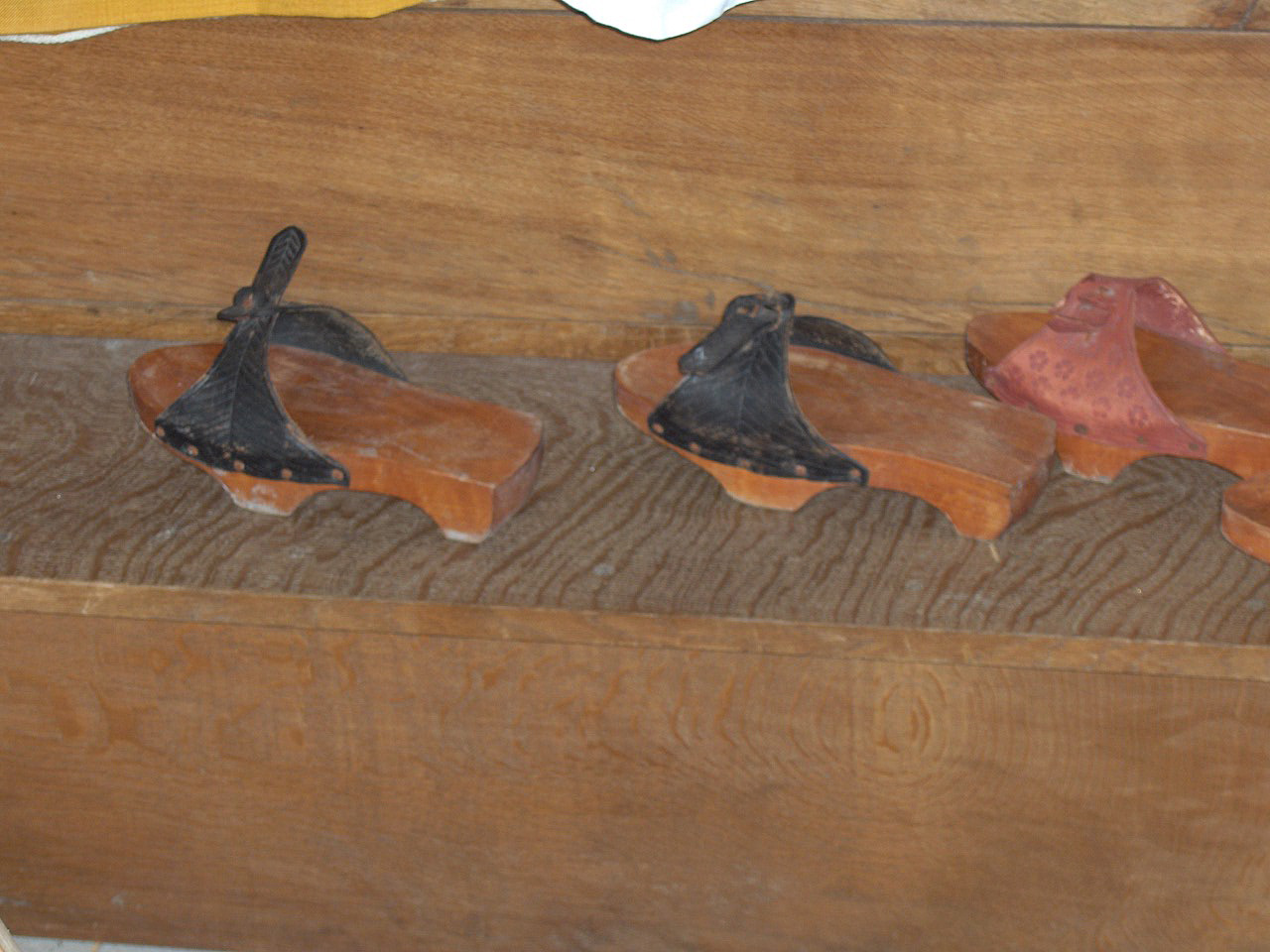
Excavated Dutch pattens, c. 1465. Only two places contact the ground. (Archeological site of Walraversijde, near Ostend)

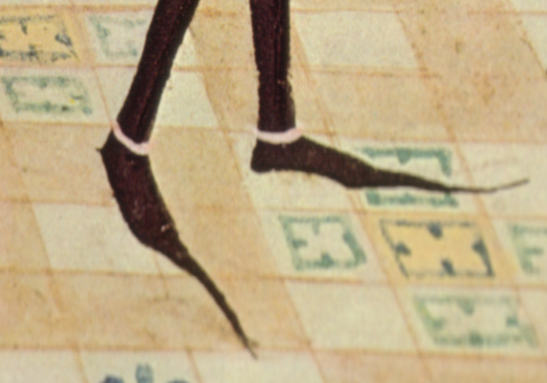
Mid-15th century poulaines. The necessary pattens for outdoor use were usually even longer. (Detail of a 15th-century illuminated manuscript of Renaud de Montauban)

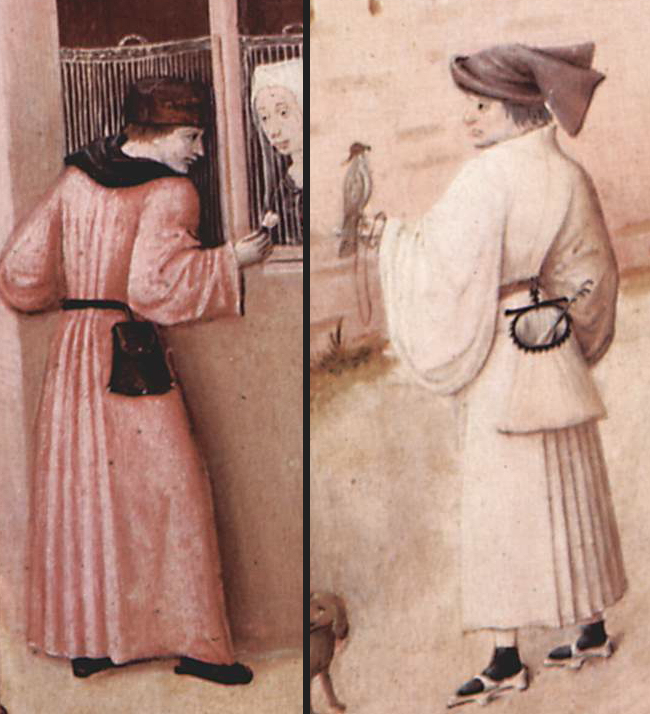
The man on the right is wearing pattens. 1475–1480 (Table of the Mortal Sins. detail: Invidia)

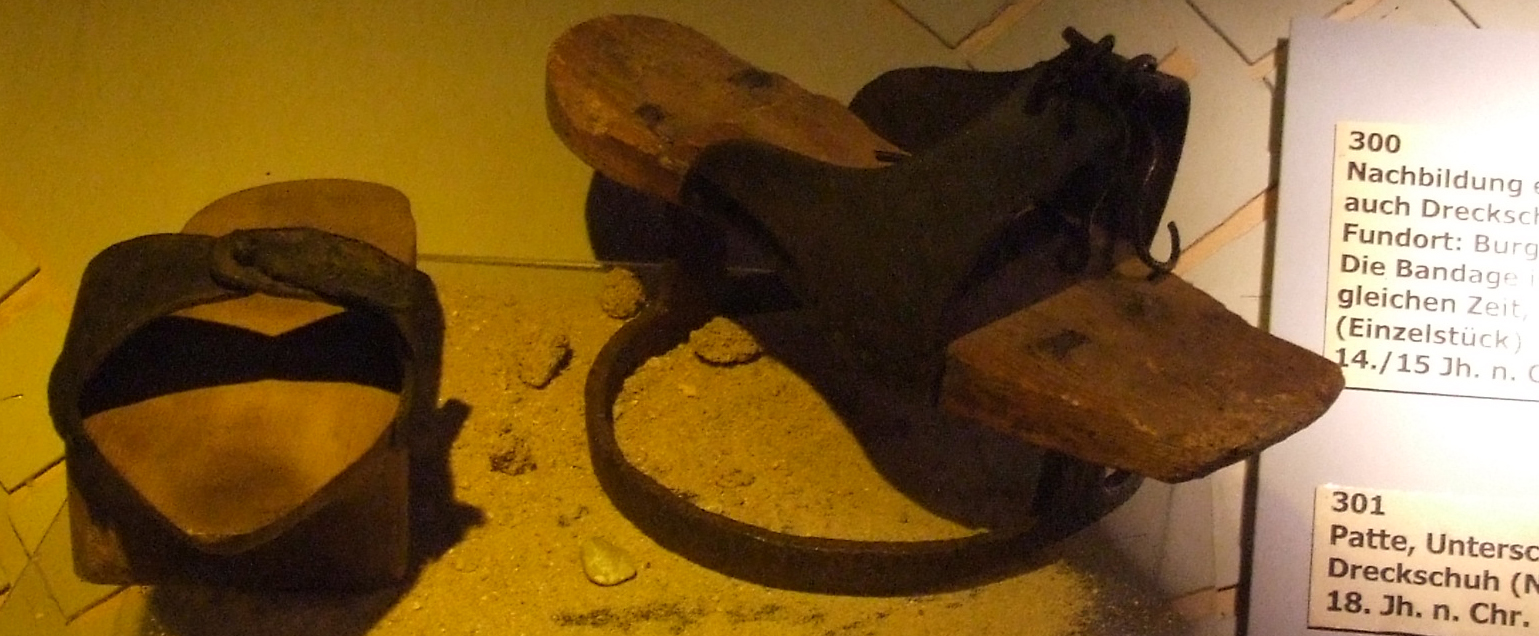
Left: German 15th-century wooden patten. Right: Dutch 18th-century patten of metal circle type. (Deutsches Schuhmuseum Hauenstein)

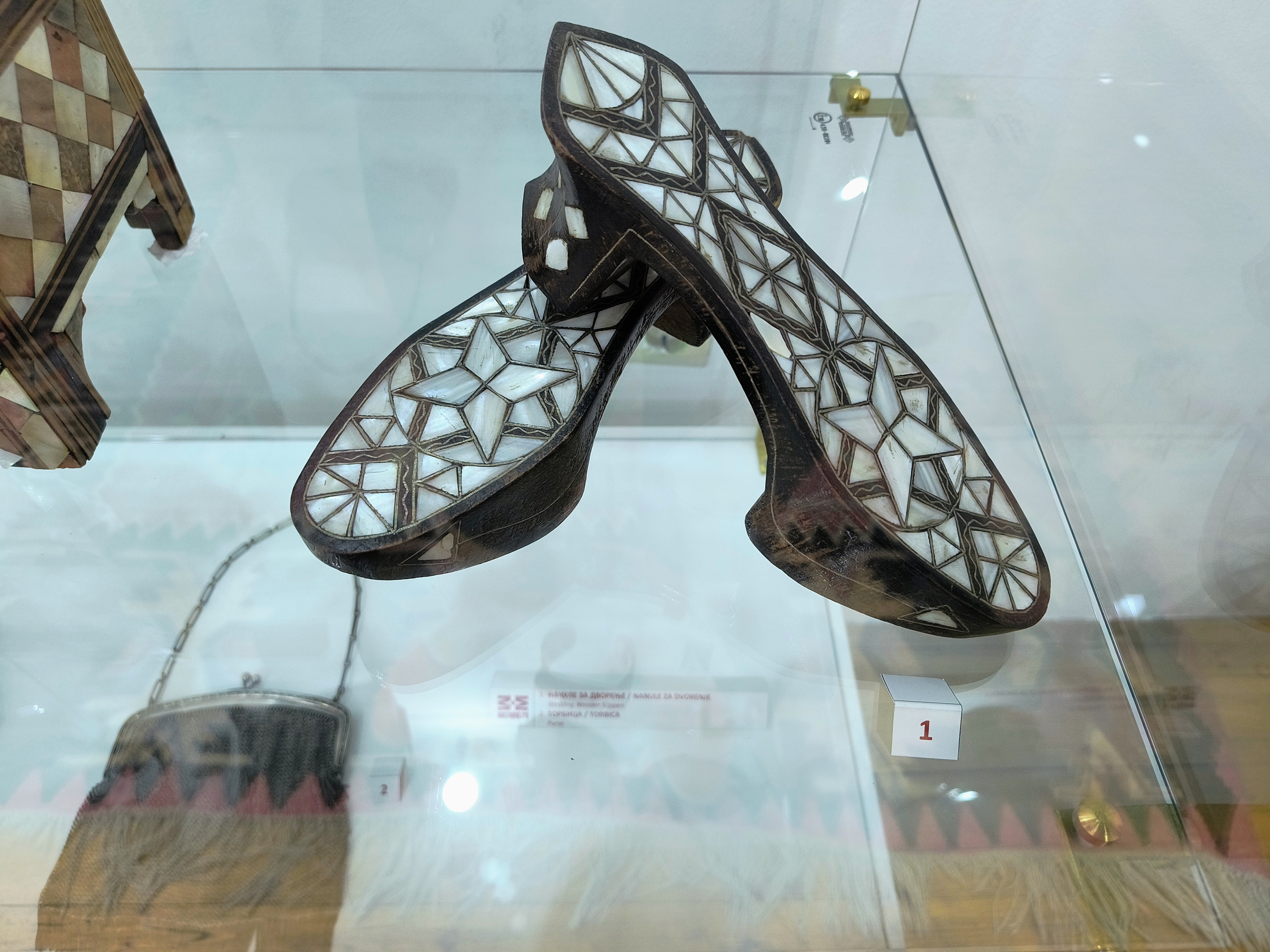
Nalin for serving (Ras Museum, Novi Pazar, Serbia)

== See also ==
- Geta (footwear)
- List of shoe styles

== Bibliography ==
- Grew, Francis; de Neergaard, Margrethe (2001), Shoes and Pattens, Museum of London, Woodbridge: Boydell Press, ISBN 0-85115-838-2.
