= Japanese armour =

Armor originating from Japan

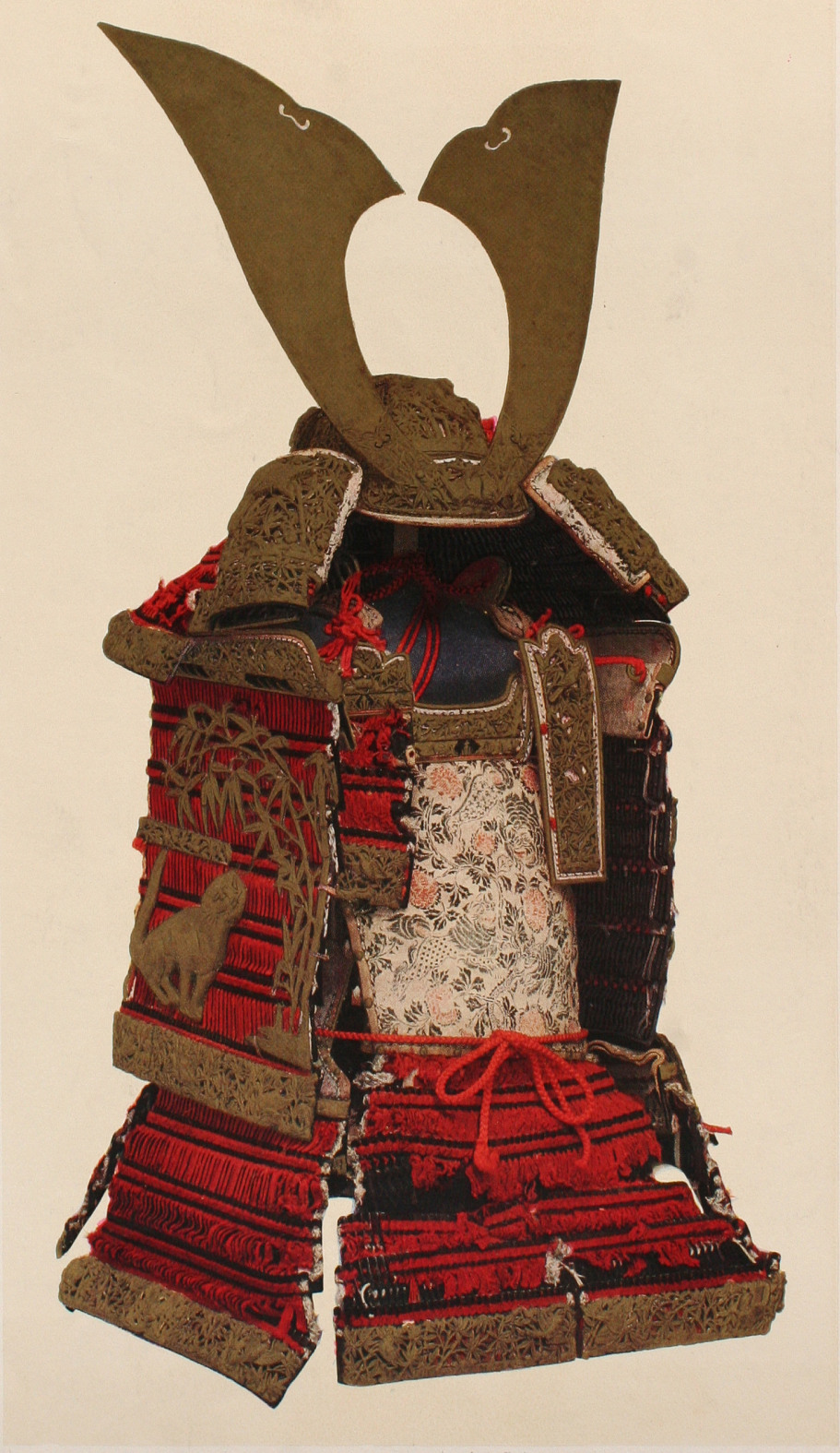
Ō-yoroi, Kamakura period, 13th-14th century, National Treasure, Kasuga Grand Shrine.

A man wearing samurai armor and jinbaori (sleeveless jacket) turns around, 2019

Japanese armour first appeared in the 4th century, as evidenced by the discovery of cuirasses and basic helmets in graves.

During the Heian period (794–1185), the unique Japanese samurai armour ō-yoroi and dō-maru appeared. The Japanese cuirass evolved into the more familiar style of body armour worn by the samurai known as the dō, with the use of leather straps (nerigawa) and Japanese lacquerware for weatherproofing. Leather and/or iron scales were also used to construct samurai armours, with leather and eventually kumihimo (braided silk) used to connect the individual scales (kozane) of the cuirass.

The Sengoku period had created new armies of ashigaru, lightly-armoured peasant soldiers armed with long spears. Japan also began trading with European powers, principally the Portuguese Empire, which is known as the Nanban trade. Matchlock guns were sold to the Japanese in the 1500s, who rapidly improved them. These new tanegashima guns were mass-produced domestically. The combination of these two things meant samurai needed much lighter and simpler armour with different defensive qualities; this new style was called tosei-gusoku "modern armour".

When a unified Japan entered the peaceful Edo period, samurai continued to wear both plate and lamellar armour as symbols of their status.

Ōyamazumi Shrine is renowned as a repository of armour. It houses 40% of armour that the government of Japan has designated as National Treasures and Important Cultural Properties. Kasuga Grand Shrine also has a large collection of valuable armour.

Every year on Children's Day, which is May 5, households in Japan display miniature samurai armour and kabuto (elaborate helmets) as an adaptation of the former Imperial Court ritual of the tango no sekku. In feudal times, real samurai armour, kabuto, and tachi (swords) were displayed.

== History ==
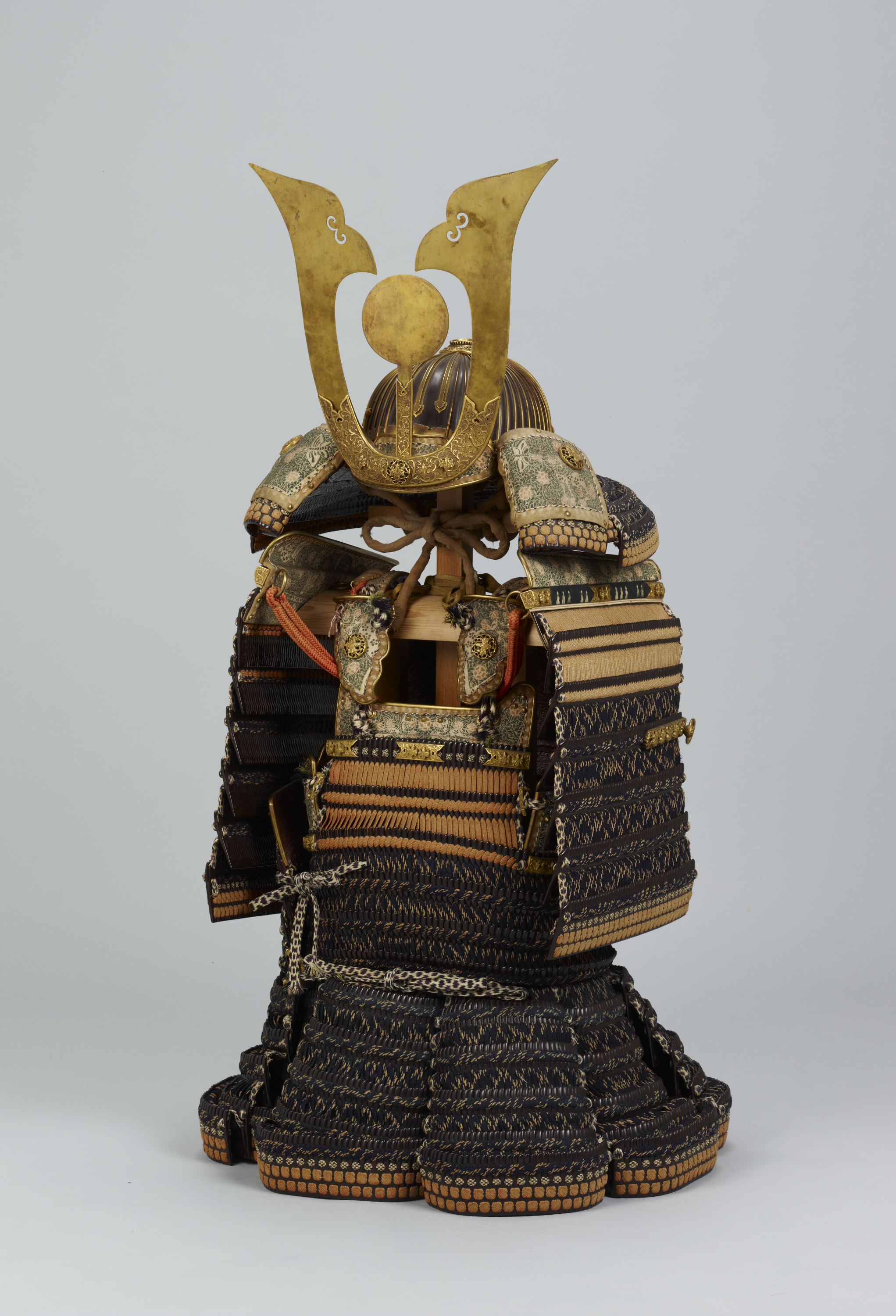
Dō-maru, Muromachi period, 15th century, Important Cultural Property, Tokyo National Museum

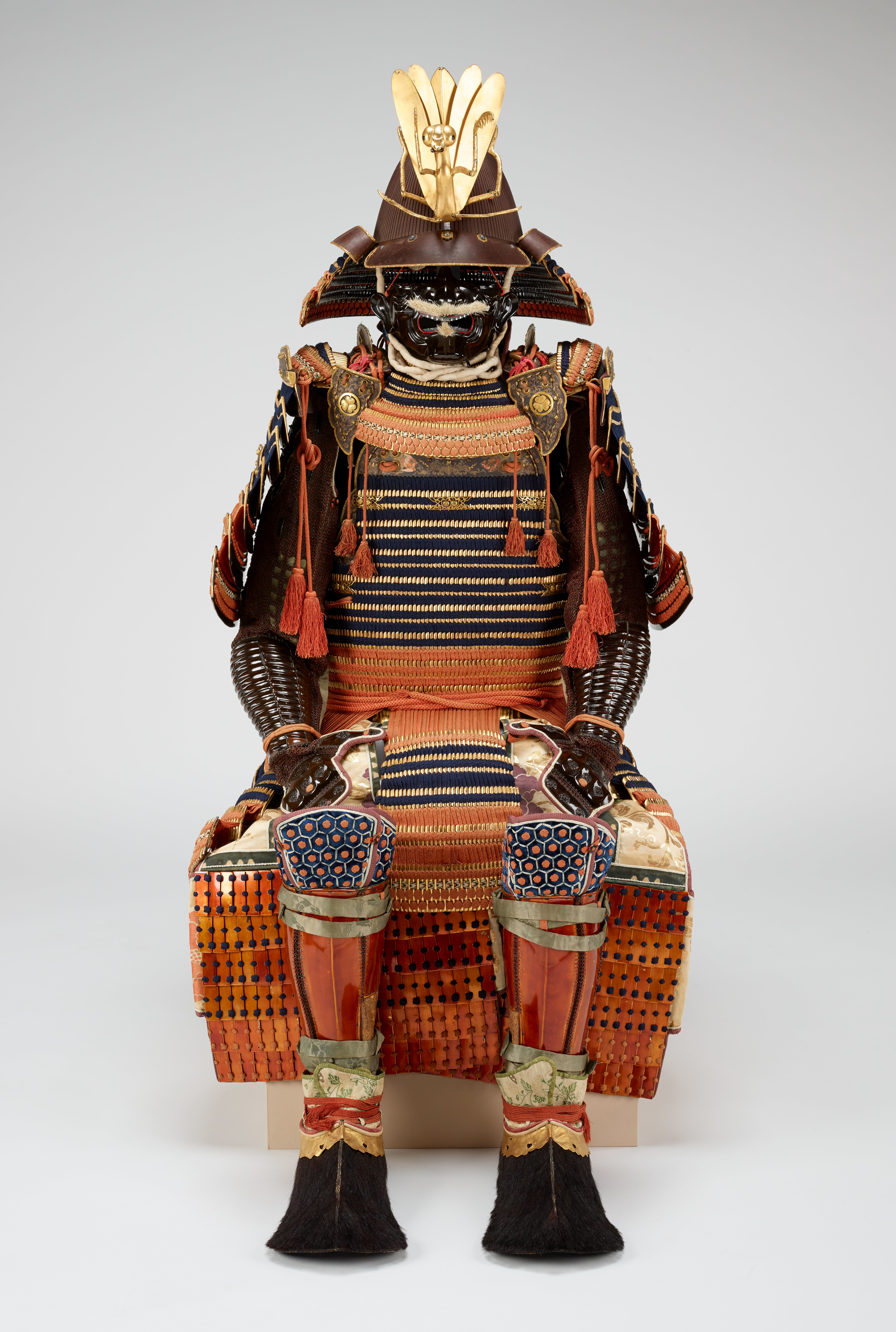
Gusoku Armour from the Kii Tokugawa Family. Edo period, 17th century. Minneapolis Institute of Art. In 2009, it sold for $602,500, the highest bid in Christie's history for a Japanese armour.

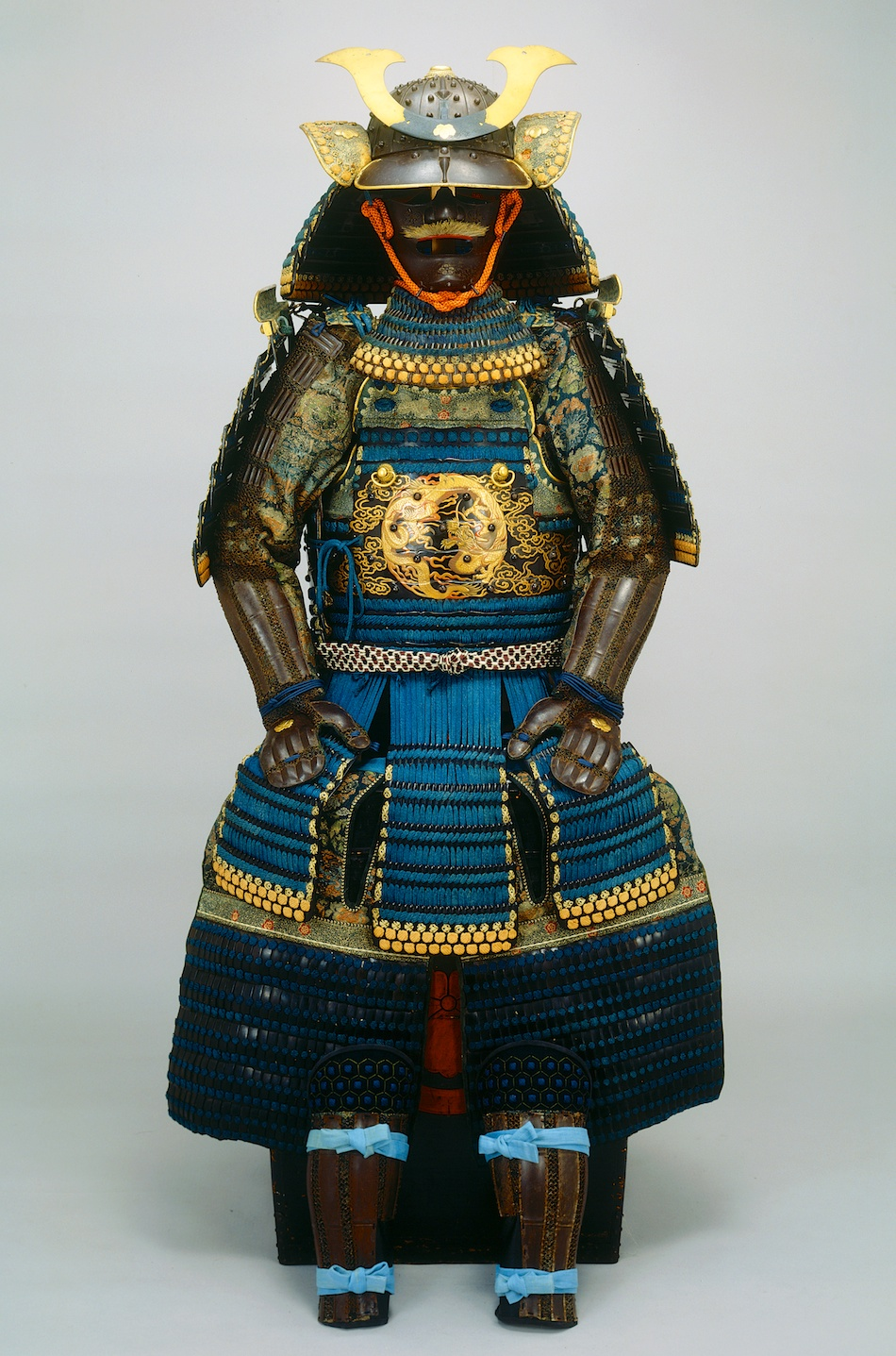
Gusoku Armour with a medieval revival style. Cloud dragon is drawn using maki-e technique. Edo period, 19th century, Tokyo Fuji Art Museum

The earliest Japanese armour is thought to have evolved from the armour used in ancient China. Cuirasses and helmets were manufactured in Japan as early as the 4th century. Tankō for foot soldiers, and keikō with extra upper torso protection for cavalry, were both pre-samurai types of early cuirass constructed from iron plates connected by leather thongs.

During the Heian (794–1185), the ō-yoroi and dō-maru emerged. High-ranking mounted samurai wore the luxurious and heavily built ō-yoroi, while the lighter dō-maru were typically used by lower-ranking foot soldiers. The Japanese cuirass evolved into the more familiar style known as the dō. Armour makers began using leather, and lacquer was applied to weatherproof the components. Leather and/or iron scales were used to construct samurai armour, with leather and kumihimo connecting the individual scales.

The artistic decoration of ō-yoroi reached its peak around the time of the Genpei War (1180–1185), a civil war at the end of the Heian. Ō-yoroi, which required a high degree of aesthetic refinement, might require up to 300 metres (980 ft) of kumihimo in various colours and weaving styles to complete a single suit of armour. Toward the end of the Kamakura period (1185–1333), even high-ranking samurai often wore the lightweight dō-maru.

In the Kamakura period (1185–1333), the simplest style of armour, called hara-ate (腹当), appeared. It protected only the front of the torso and the sides of the abdomen and was worn by lower-ranked soldiers. In the late Kamakura, the haramaki appeared, which extended both ends of the hara-ate to the back. During the Nanboku-chō period (1336–1392), ashigaru and conscripted farmers fought on foot, increasing demand for light, mobile, and inexpensive haramaki. Later, kabuto, men-yoroi (facial armor), and kote (gauntlets) were added to the haramaki, and even high-ranking samurai began to wear them.

In the Muromachi period (1336–1573), the production process of armour became simplified, and mass production became possible at a lower cost and faster rate than before. The scales of traditional armour were connected with cords in a style called kebiki odoshi (毛引縅), which was so dense that the entire surface of the scales was covered with the cords. During this period, another new method, called sugake odoshi (素懸縅), was adopted, in which two cords sparsely connected the scales. The technique of overlapping armour scales was also simplified. Traditional-style scales were the honkozane (本小札), in which half the scales overlapped and were connected. During this period, a new style of scales, iyozane (伊予札), was developed, in which one-fourth of the scales were overlapped and connected.

In the 16th century, the Nanban trade brought matchlocks to Japan in 1543. These were called "Tanegashima" after Tanegashima, the first island the Europeans arrived on. Soon after, when Japanese smiths improved and began to mass-produce the tanegashima, warfare changed completely. The samurai needed armour that was lighter and more protective. In addition, large-scale battles also required the mass production of armour. As a result, the tosei-gusoku was created from the design of the dō-maru.

Additionally, the Japanese adopted a full-plate armour known as nanban dō-gusoku, with an iron helmet and solid cuirass, in imitation of Portuguese armour. The first set was given to Sakakibara Yasumasa by Tokugawa Ieyasu right before the Battle of Sekigahara (1600). It was handed down in the Sakakibara family. Scales were changed to itazane (板札), a relatively large iron or leather plate, providing better defence. Itazane could also replace a row of individual honkozane or iyozane with a single plate. This type of gusoku resembled plate armour; the front and back dō are made from a single iron plate with a raised center and a V-shaped bottom, was called Nanban dō gusoku (Southern barbarian gusoku). Bullet resistant armours were developed called tameshi gusoku ('bullet tested'), allowing samurai to continue wearing armour despite the use of firearms.

Since the armour was no longer flexible, gusoku has changed its method to facilitate donning and doffing by opening and closing the armour at a hinge. The simplified structure of the armour makes it easier to manufacture, allowing armour makers to focus on design and to increase the variety of armour appearances. For example, the iron plate was designed to resemble an old man's chest, and dō-maru-style gusoku was made by attaching coloured threads to its surface.

Samurai during this period, especially those with a high rank, such as daimyo, owned a lot of suits of armour. For example, Tokugawa Ieyasu owned dozens of suits, which are now owned by Kunōzan Tōshō-gū, Nikkō Tōshō-gū, Kishū Tōshō-gū, Tokugawa Art Museum, The Tokugawa Museum, Tokyo National Museum, etc.

The era of warfare called the Sengoku period (1467–1615) ended when a united Japan entered the peaceful Edo period (1603–1868). Although samurai continued to use both plate and lamellar armour as a symbol of their status, traditional armours were no longer necessary for battle. For this reason, in the Edo period, armour in the style of the revival of the medieval period, incorporating gorgeous ō-yoroi and dō-maru designs, became popular.

During the Edo period, lightweight, portable, and secret armours became popular, as personal protection remained necessary. Civil strife, duels, assassinations, and peasant revolts all required the use of armours such as the kusari (chain jacket) and armoured sleeves, as well as other types of armour that could be worn under ordinary clothing. Edo period samurai were in charge of internal security and would wear various types of kusari gusoku (chain armour) and shin and arm protection as well as armored hachimaki to protect the forehead.

Armour continued to be worn and used until the Meiji era in the 1860s, with the last use of samurai armour in 1877 during the Satsuma Rebellion.

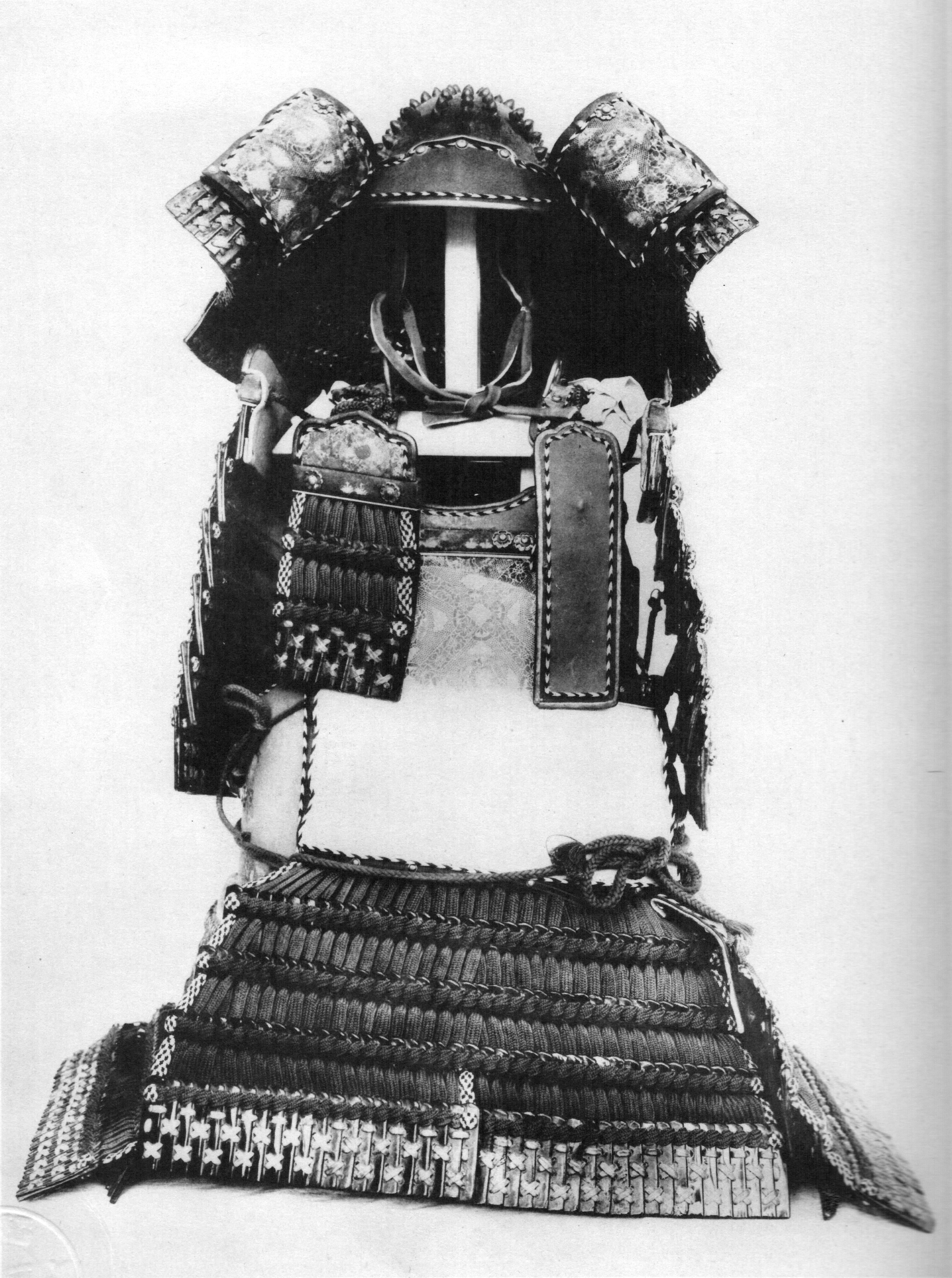
12th century

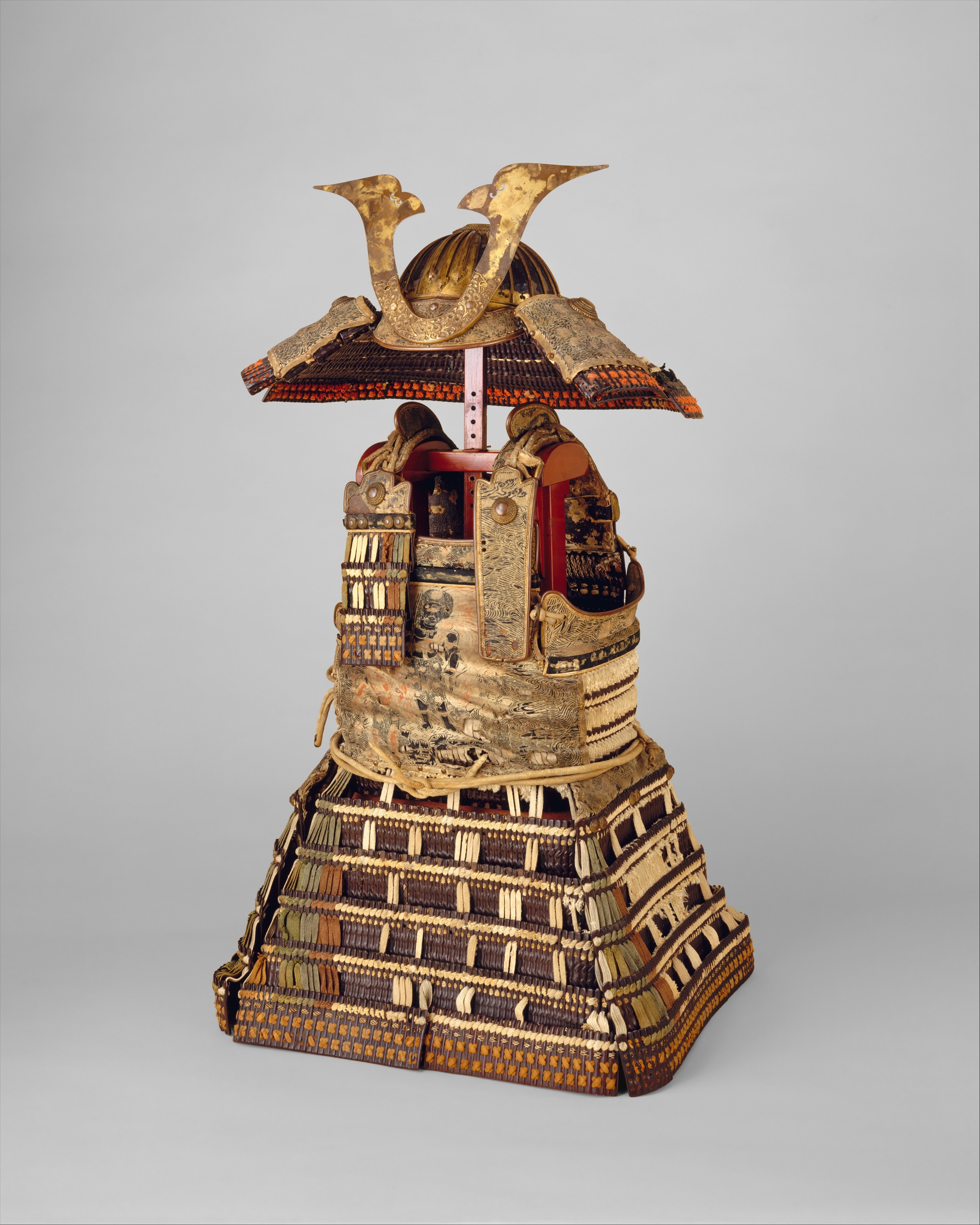
Ashikaga Takauji's ō-yoroi (shoulder guards, missing here). Kamakura or Muromachi period, early 14th century, The Metropolitan Museum of Art

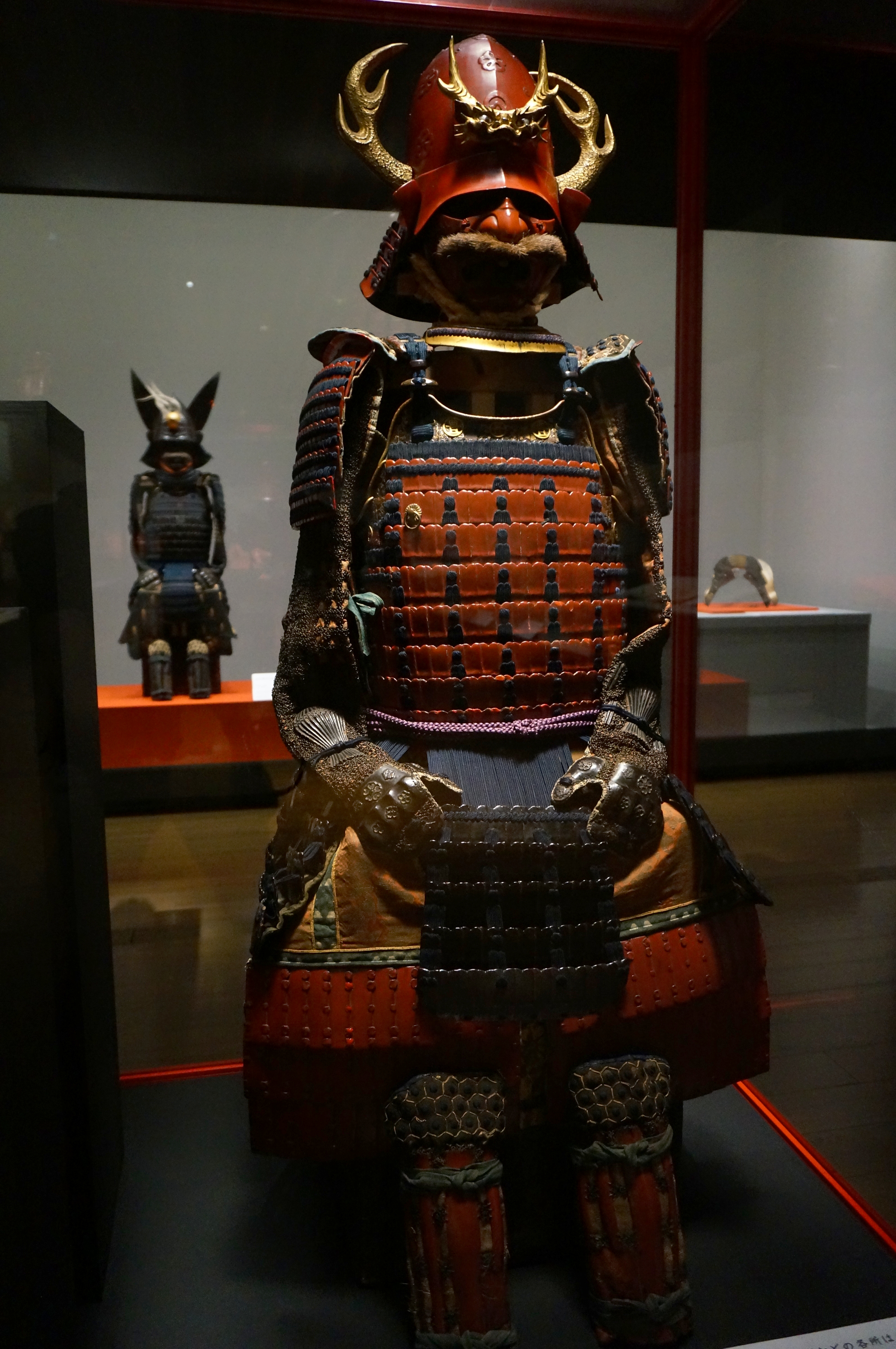
Toyotomi Hidetsugu's gusoku armour, Azuchi–Momoyama period, 16th–17th century, Suntory Museum of Art

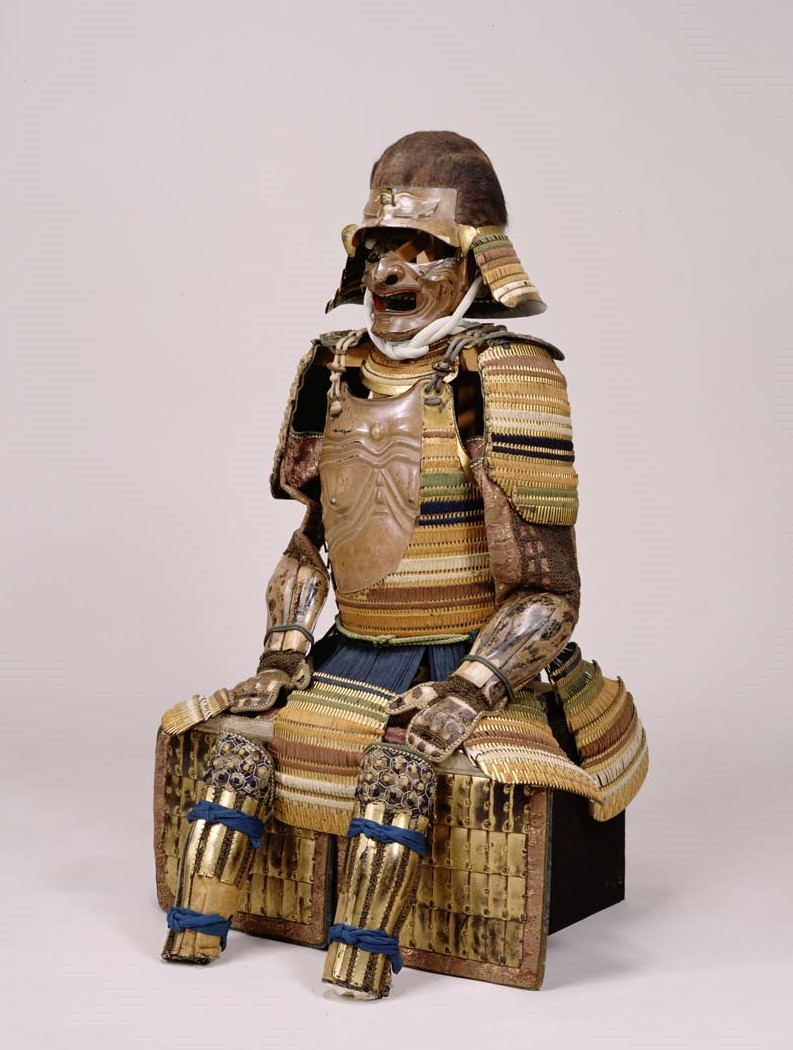
Gusoku Type Armor Two-piece cuirass with bared chest design. Gold leaf is pasted on several itazane to express the chest of an old man, and colored thread is pasted to express kozane. Azuchi–Momoyama or Edo period, 16th–17th century, Tokyo National Museum

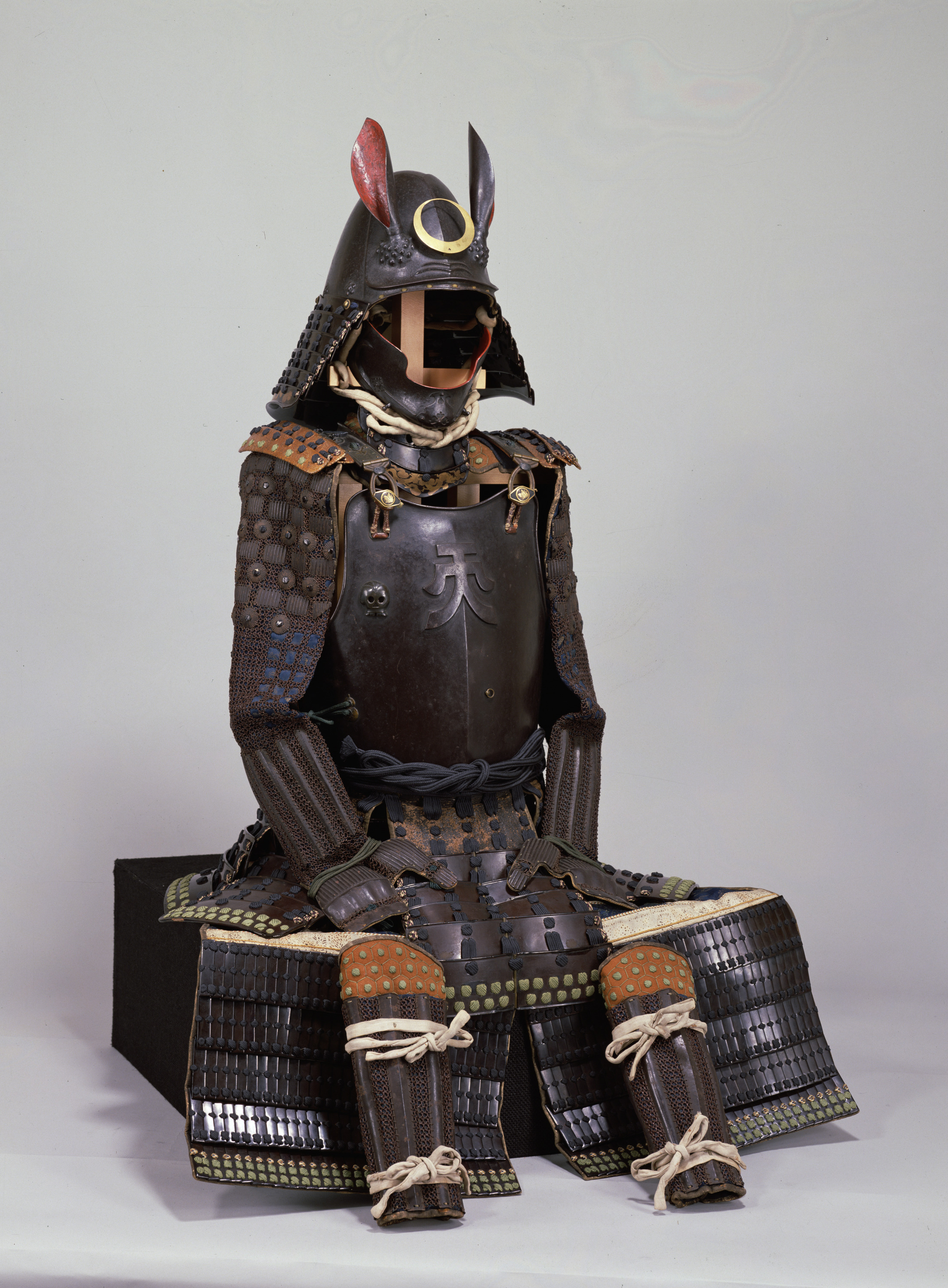
Akechi Hidemitsu's Nanban dou gusoku (western style gusoku), Azuchi–Momoyama or Edo period, 16th–17th century, Tokyo National Museum

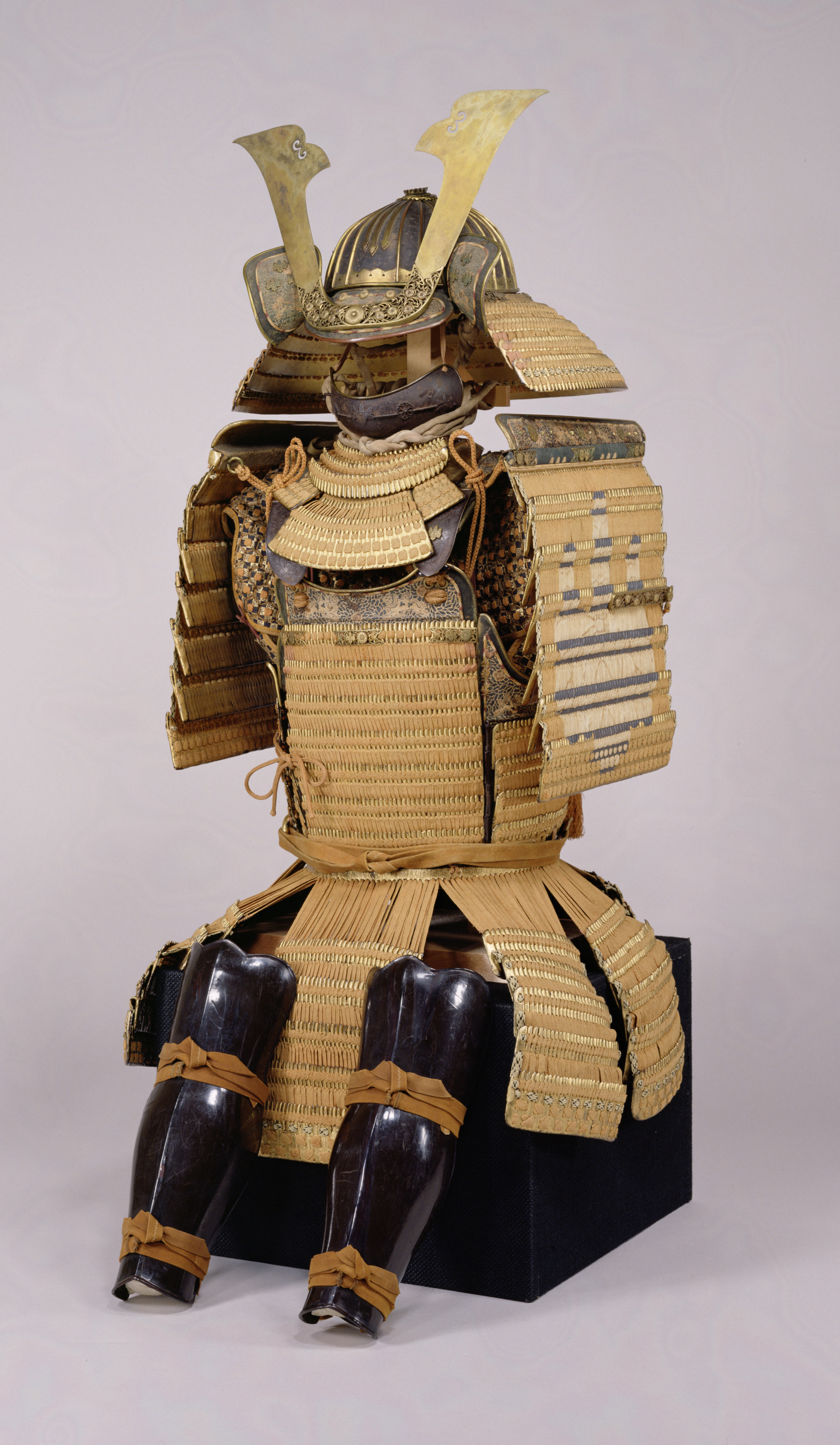
Gusoku with a Five-Piece Cuirass, Gilded Scales, and Red Lacing. Azuchi–Momoyama or Edo period, 16th–17th century, Tokyo National Museum

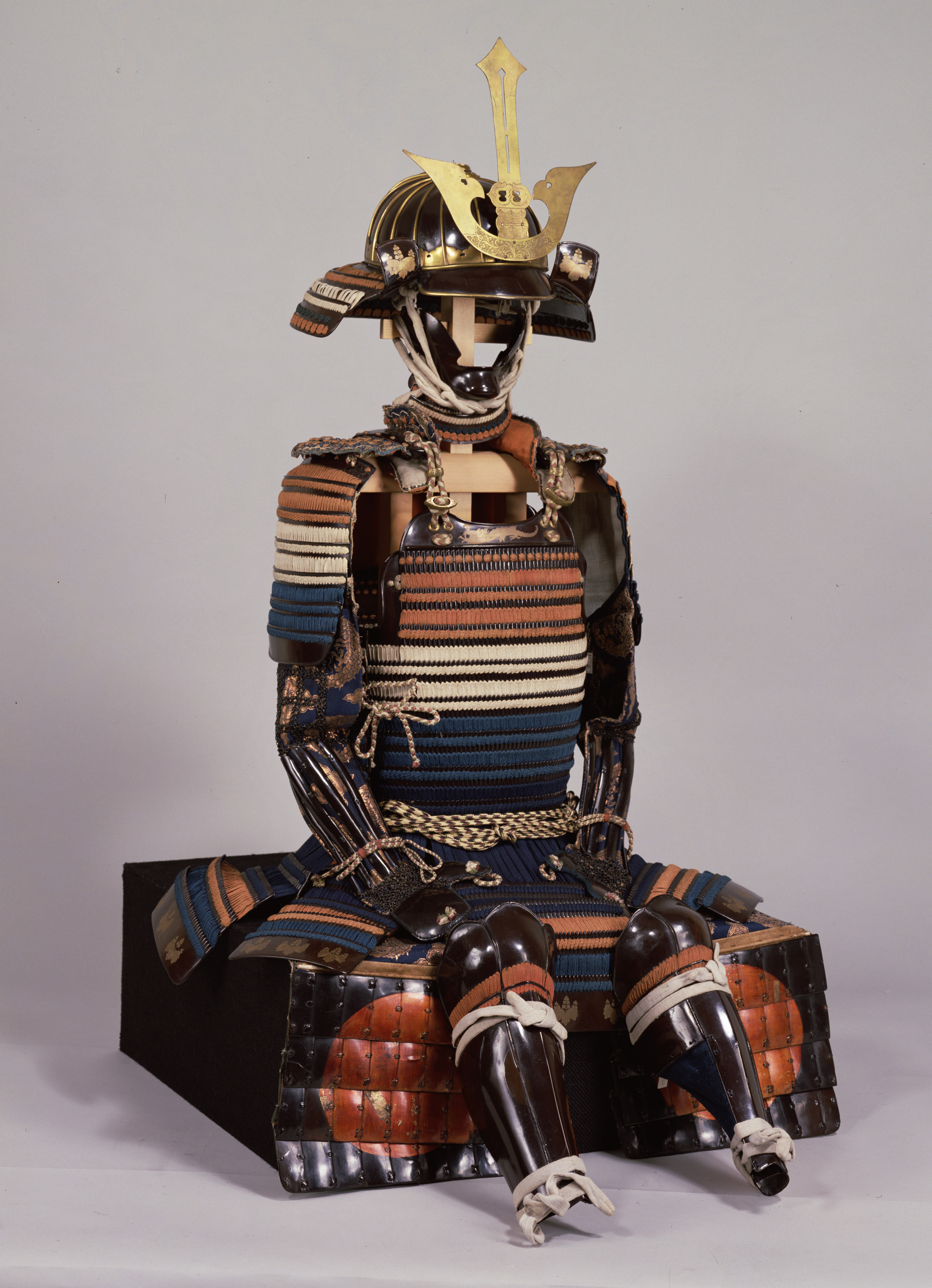
Tokugawa Ieyasu's Gusoku Type Armor With two-piece cuirass and variegated lacing. Azuchi–Momoyama or Edo period, 17th century, Tokyo National Museum

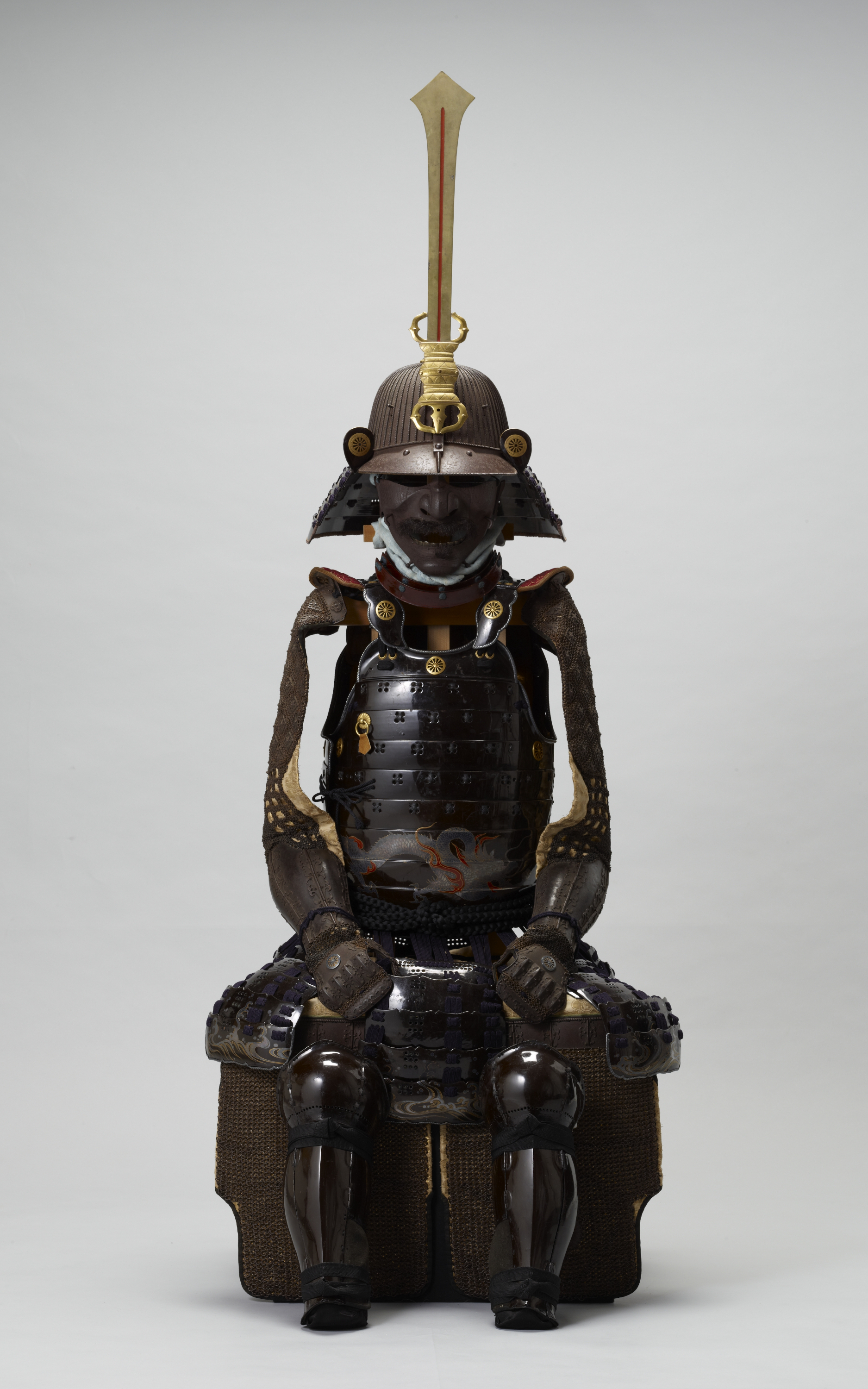
Sakakibara Yasumasa's Gusoku Style Armor With black lacing, Edo period, 17th century, Important Cultural Property, Tokyo National Museum

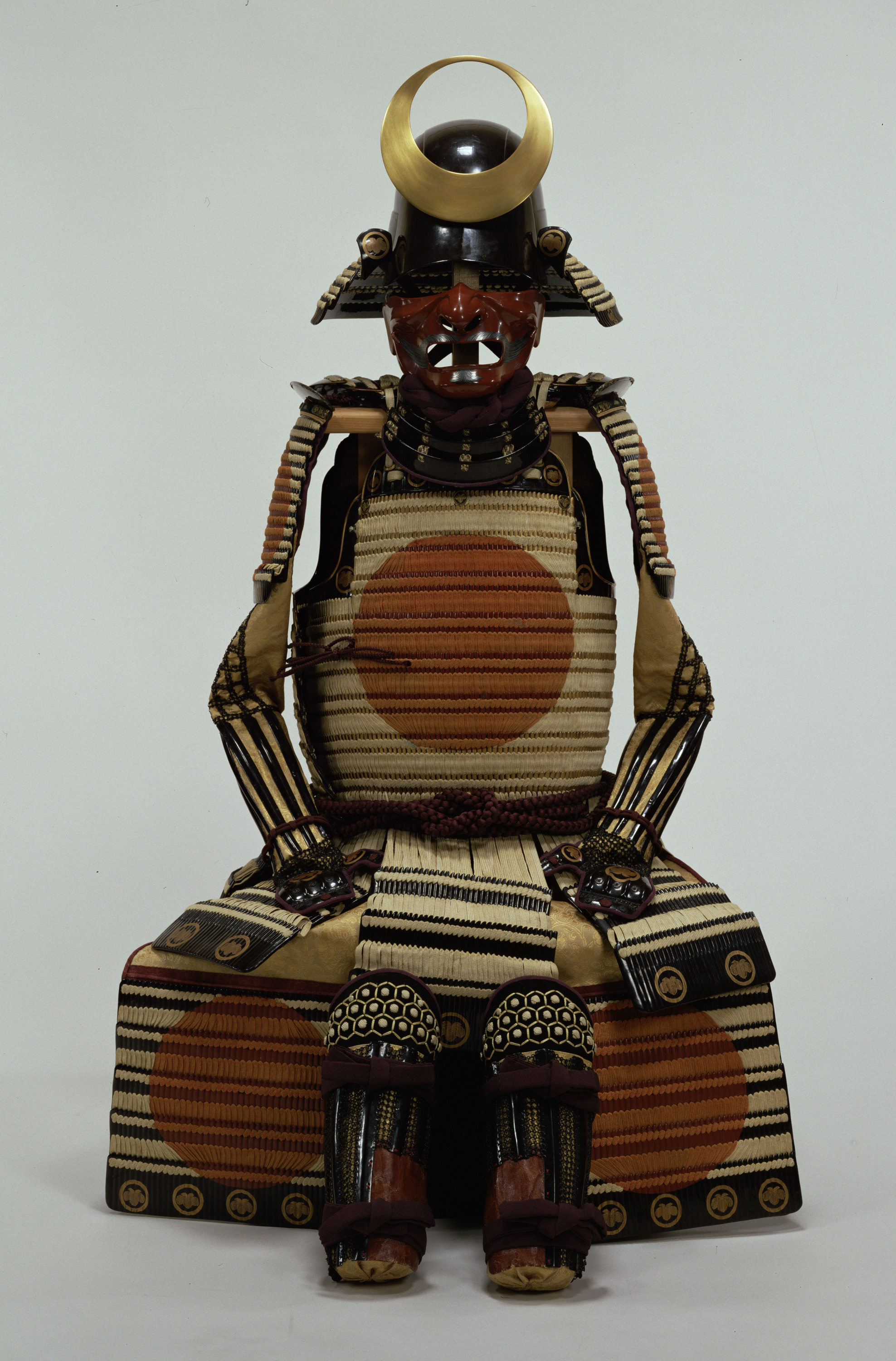
Matsudaira Ienori's Gusoku Type Armor With domaru cuirass and white lacing. Edo period, 17th century, Tokyo National Museum

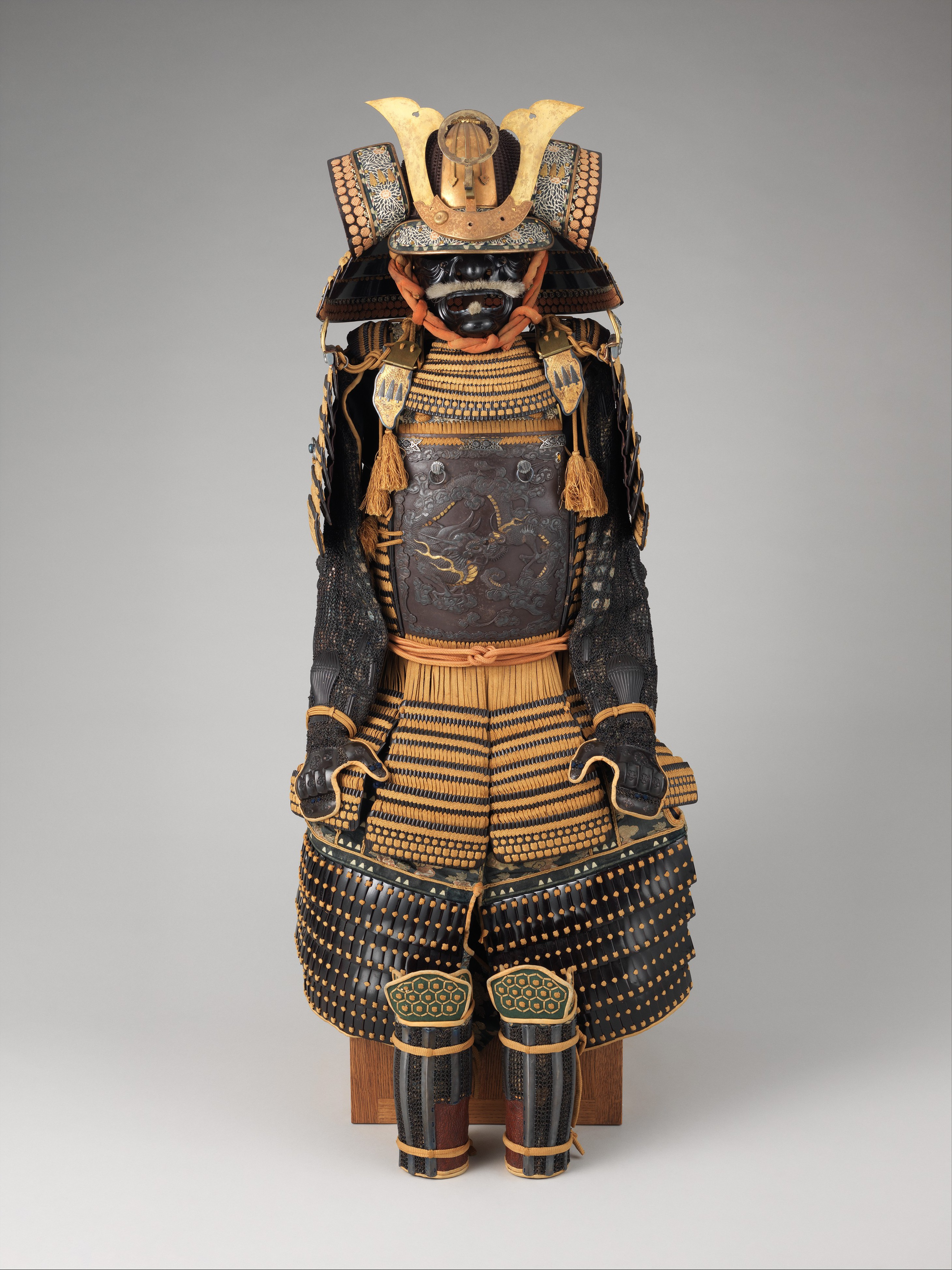
Gusoku with a medieval revival style. Edo period, 18th–19th century, The Metropolitan Museum of Art

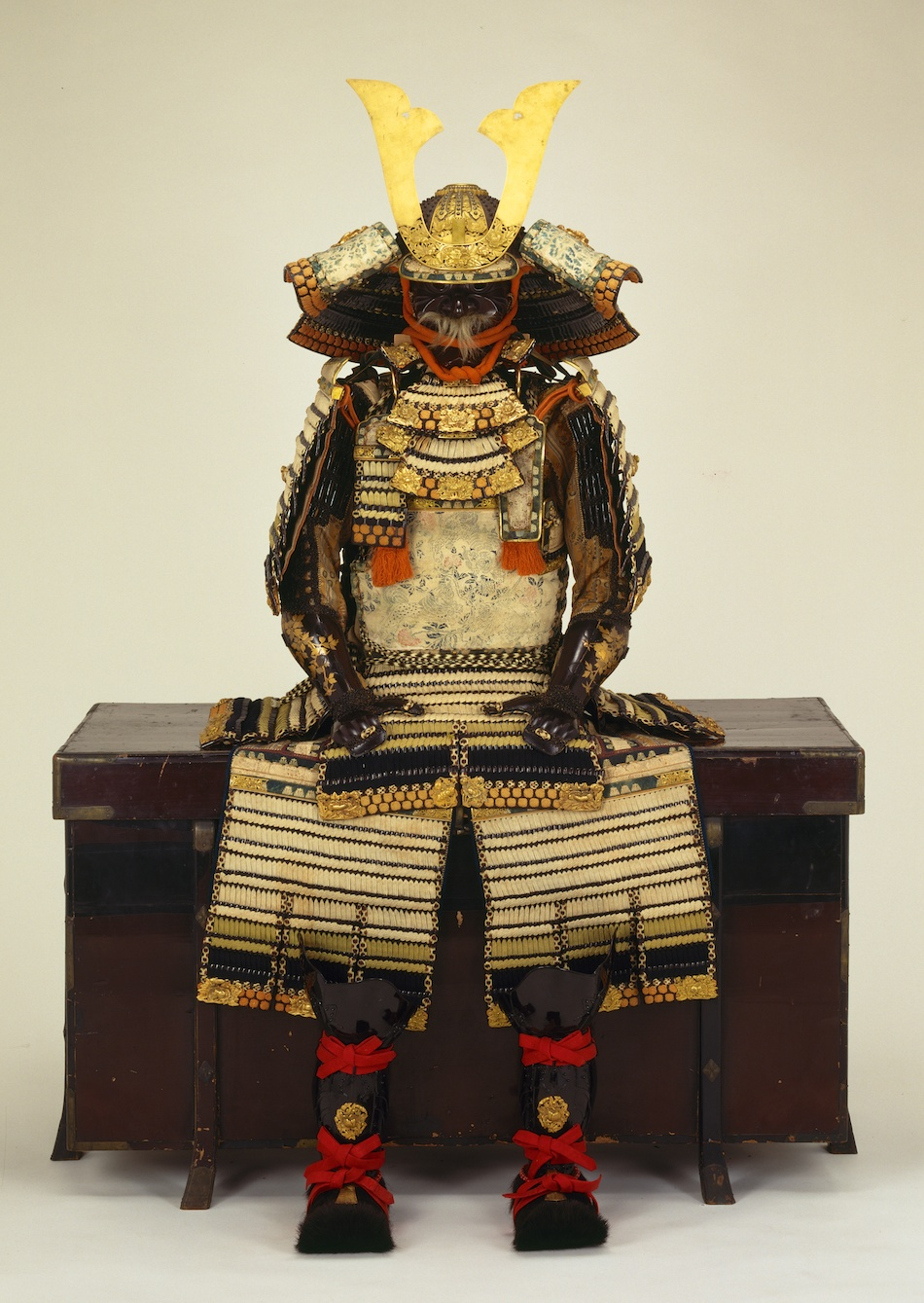
Ō-yoroi owned by Shimazu Nariakira. Edo period, 19th century. Tokyo Fuji Art Museum

== Construction ==
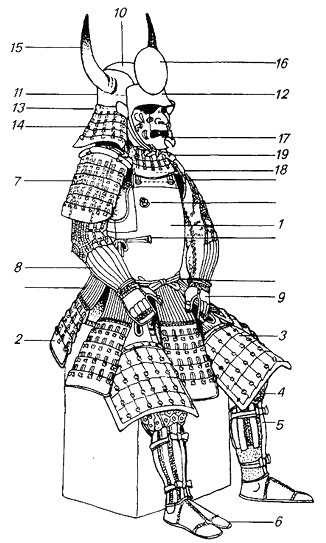
Construction of samurai armour, Source Wendelin Boeheim Leipzig 1890: 1. Cuirass - dō (胴（仏胴）); 2. Fauld - kusazuri (草摺); 3. Cuisse - haidate (佩楯); 4. Poleyn - tateage (立挙); 5. Greaves - suneate (臑当（篠臑当）); 6. Sabaton - kōgake (甲懸); 7. Spaulders - sode (袖（当世袖）); 8. Vambrace - kote (籠手（篠籠手）); 9. Gauntlets - tekkō (手甲（摘手甲）); 10. Helm - kabuto (兜（日根野形頭形兜）); 11. Badge (helmet) - kasa-jirushi (笠印); 12. Forehead plate - mabisashi (眉庇); 13. Lame - fukikaeshi (吹返); 14. Neck guard - shikoro (しころ（日根野しころ）); 15. Crest (here: water buffalo horns) - wakidate (立物（水牛の脇立）); 16. Crest (here: sun disk) - maedate (立物（日輪の前立）); 17. Faceplate - menpō or mempō (面頬（目の下頬）); 18. Badge (shoulder) - sode-jirushi (垂); 19. Bevor - yodare-kake (襟廻)

Japanese armour was generally constructed from many small iron (tetsu) and/or leather (nerigawa) scales (kozane) and/or plates (ita-mono), connected to each other by rivets and macramé cords (odoshi) made from leather and/or braided silk, and/or chain armour (kusari). Noble families had silk cords made in specific patterns and colors of silk thread. Many of these cords were constructed of well over 100 strands of silk. Making these special silk cords could take many months of steady work, just to complete enough for one suit of armour.

These armour plates were usually attached to a cloth or leather backing. Japanese armour was designed to be as lightweight as possible as the samurai had many tasks including riding a horse, archery, and swordsmanship. The armour was usually brightly lacquered to protect against the harsh Japanese climate. Chain armour (kusari) was also used to construct individual armour pieces and full suits of kusari were even used.

== Individual armour parts ==
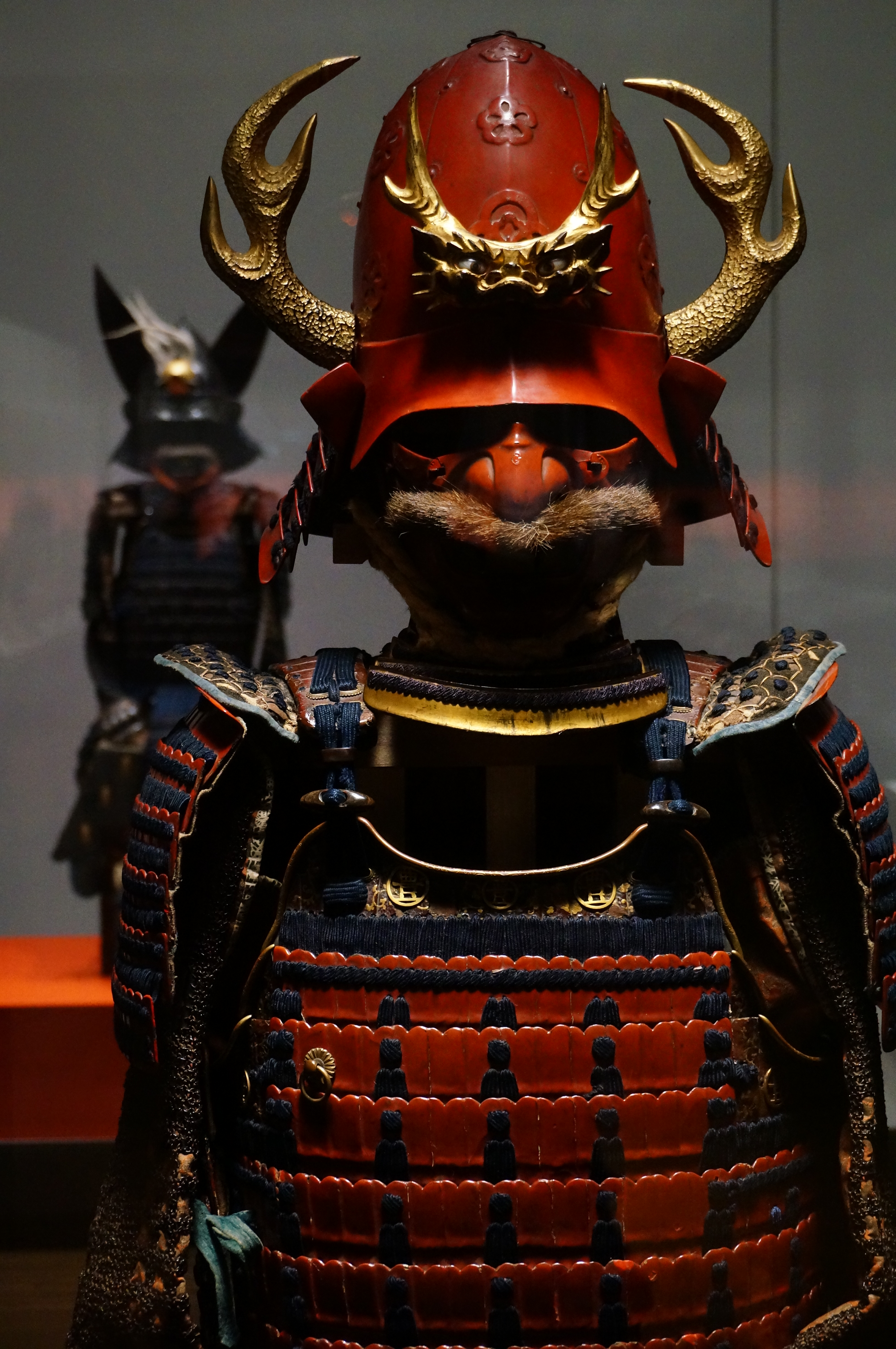
The itazane-structured dou (cuirass), the quirky designs of kabuto (helmet) and mengu (face guard), are typical features of the gusoku armour. Azuchi–Momoyama period, 16th-17th century, Suntory Museum of Art

A full suit of traditional Samurai armour could include the following items:

- Dou or dō, a chest armour made up of iron and or leather plates of various sizes and shapes with pendents
- Kusazuri made from iron or leather plates hanging from the front and back of the dou (dō) to protect the lower body and upper leg.
- Sode, large rectangular shoulder protection made from iron and or leather plates.
- Kote, armoured glove like sleeves which extended to the shoulder or han kote (kote gauntlets) which covered the forearms. Kote were made from cloth covered with iron plates of various size and shape, connected by chain armour (kusari).
- Kabuto, a helmet made from iron or leather plates (from 3 to over 100 plates) riveted together. A neck guard shikoro made from several layers of curved iron or leather strips was suspended from the bottom edge of the kabuto.
- Mengu, various types of lacquered metal and or leather facial armour designed in a way that the top heavy helmet kabuto could be tied and secured to them by various metal posts. Mengu had throat guards yodare-kake made from several rows of iron or leather plates or kusari (chain armour) sewn to a cloth backing, suspended from the bottom edge.
- Haidate, thigh guards which tied around the waist and covered the thighs. These were made from cloth with small iron and or leather plates of various size and shape, usually connected to each other by chain armour (kusari) and sewn to the cloth.
- Suneate, shin guards made from iron splints connected together by chain armour (kusari) and sewn to cloth and tied around the calf.

== Auxiliary armours ==
- Guruwa, a type of throat and neck protector.
- Nodowa, a type of throat and neck guard.
- Tate-eri, the tate-eri is a small padded pillow like piece with a standing armored collar that sits on the shoulder to protect from the weight of the dou (dō). The standing collar would be lined with kikko armour to protect the neck.
- Manju no wa, the manju no wa, (also manjunowa or manju nowa) is a combination of shoulder pads, collar and armpit guards in one that protected the upper chest area. Manju no wa were covered with kusari (chain armour), karuta (small armour plates), or kikko (brigandine), these armours or a combination of them were sewn to a cloth backing. The armour could be exposed or hidden between a layer of cloth. When worn the manju no wa looked like a small tight fitting vest. Manju no wa have small wings that would pass under the arm pit area from the back and attach to the front of the manju no wa.
- Manchira, the manchira is a type of armoured-vest covered with kusari (chain armour), karuta (small armour plates) or kikko (brigandine), these armours or a combination of them were sewn to a cloth backing. The armour could be exposed or hidden between a layer of cloth. Manchira are larger than manju no wa and protected the chest area and sometimes the neck and arm pit. Some manchira could be worn over the dou (dō).
- Wakibiki, the wakibiki is a simple rectangle of cloth covered with kusari (chain armour), karuta (small iron plates), or kikko (brigandine) these armours or a combination of them were sewn to the cloth backing. Wakibiki could also be made from one solid piece of iron or hardened leather. The wakibiki had cords connected to them which allowed the wakibiki to hang from the shoulder, the wakibiki was then suspended over the exposed arm pit area. Wakibiki were either worn inside or outside the chest armour dou (dō) depending on the type.
- Yoroi zukin, cloth hoods with various types of armour sewn to the cloth.
- Kogake, armored tabi, a kind of sabaton that covered the top of the foot.
- Jingasa (war hat), resembling the civilian coolie hat, issued to Ashigaru retainers, these could be made from metal or leather.
- Hachi gane/hitai ate, various types of lightweight, portable, forehead protectors.
- Yoroi katabira, jackets covered with various types of armour, the armour could be exposed or hidden between layers of cloth.
- Yoroi hakama, pants covered with various types of armour, the armour could be exposed or hidden between layers of cloth.
- Kusari gusoku, chain mail.

== Clothing worn with Japanese armour ==
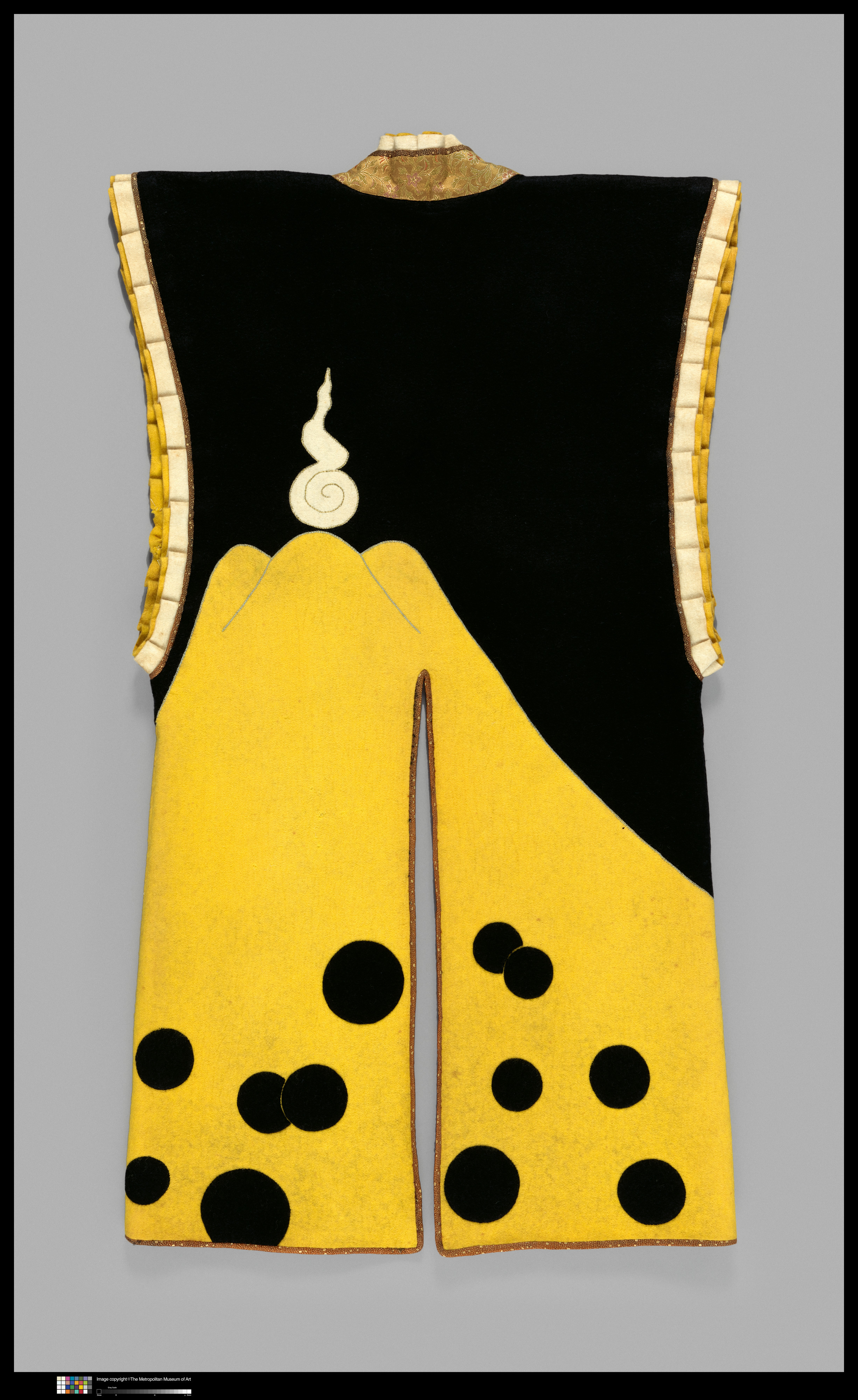
This is a replica of jinbaori with a Mount Fuji design that was worn by Toyotomi Hideyoshi in the 16th century. early–mid-19th century, Metropolitan Museum of Art

- Uwa-obi or himo, a cloth sash or belt used for attaching various weapons and other items such as the katana, wakizashi and tantō.
- Fundoshi, a simple loin cloth.
- Kyahan or kiahan, tight gaiters made of cloth which covered the shins.
- Hakama, a type of pants worn underneath the armour, hakama could be long or short like the kobakama.
- Shitagi, a shirt worn underneath the armour.
- Tabi, a cloth sock with divided toes.
- Waraji, a woven sandal also known as zōri.
- Kutsu, short riding boots made from leather.
- Yugake, gloves that were worn under the kote.
- Kegutsu, also known as tsuranuki, short leather shoes trimmed with bear fur.
- Jinbaori, sleeveless jacket worn over Japanese armour.

== Auxiliary items worn with Japanese armour ==
- Sashimono, a small banner that is attached to the back of the dou (dō) by special fittings. Its purpose was to identify the wearer as friend or foe which was essential in the chaotic confusion of a pitched battle melee.
- Horo, a cloak reserved for prestigious, high-ranking samurai. It provides additional protection from arrows.
- Agemaki, a decorative tassel worn on the back of some dou and kabuto, the agemaki can also serve as an attachment point.
- Jirushi, small identification flags or badges worn on the back of the helmet (kasa jirushi) or on the shoulder (sode jurishi).
- Datemono/tatemono, crests of various shapes and sizes worn on several areas of the helmet (kabuto).
- Yebira, arrow quiver for ya (arrows).

== Types ==
=== Pre-samurai armour ===
- Armours that were worn in Japan before the samurai class evolved.
  - Tanko
  - Keiko
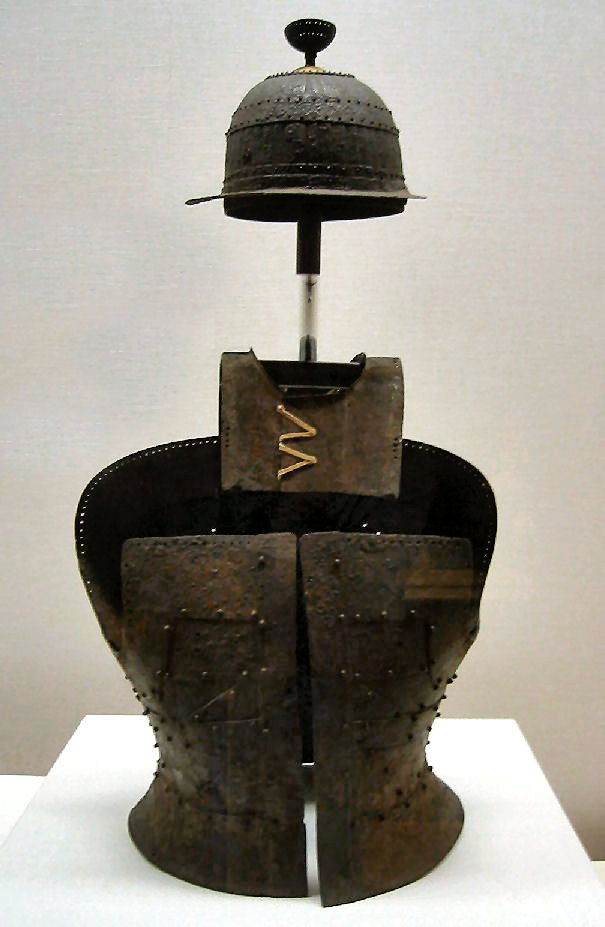
Tanko Iron helmet and armour with gilt bronze decoration, Kofun period, 5th century. Tokyo National Museum.

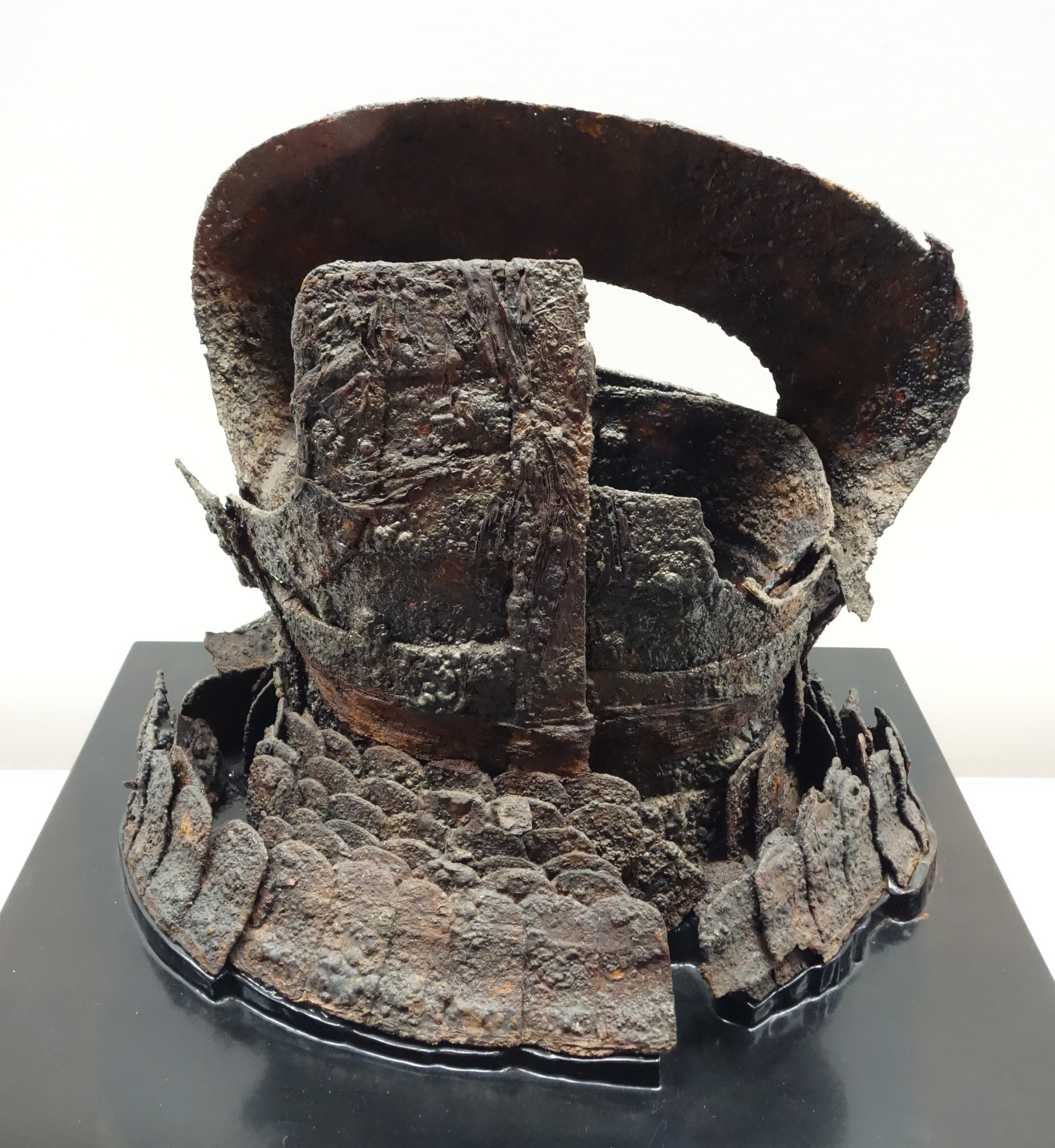
Kofun period armour, made of iron plate sewn with leather strings. 5th century Japan. Tokyo National Museum.

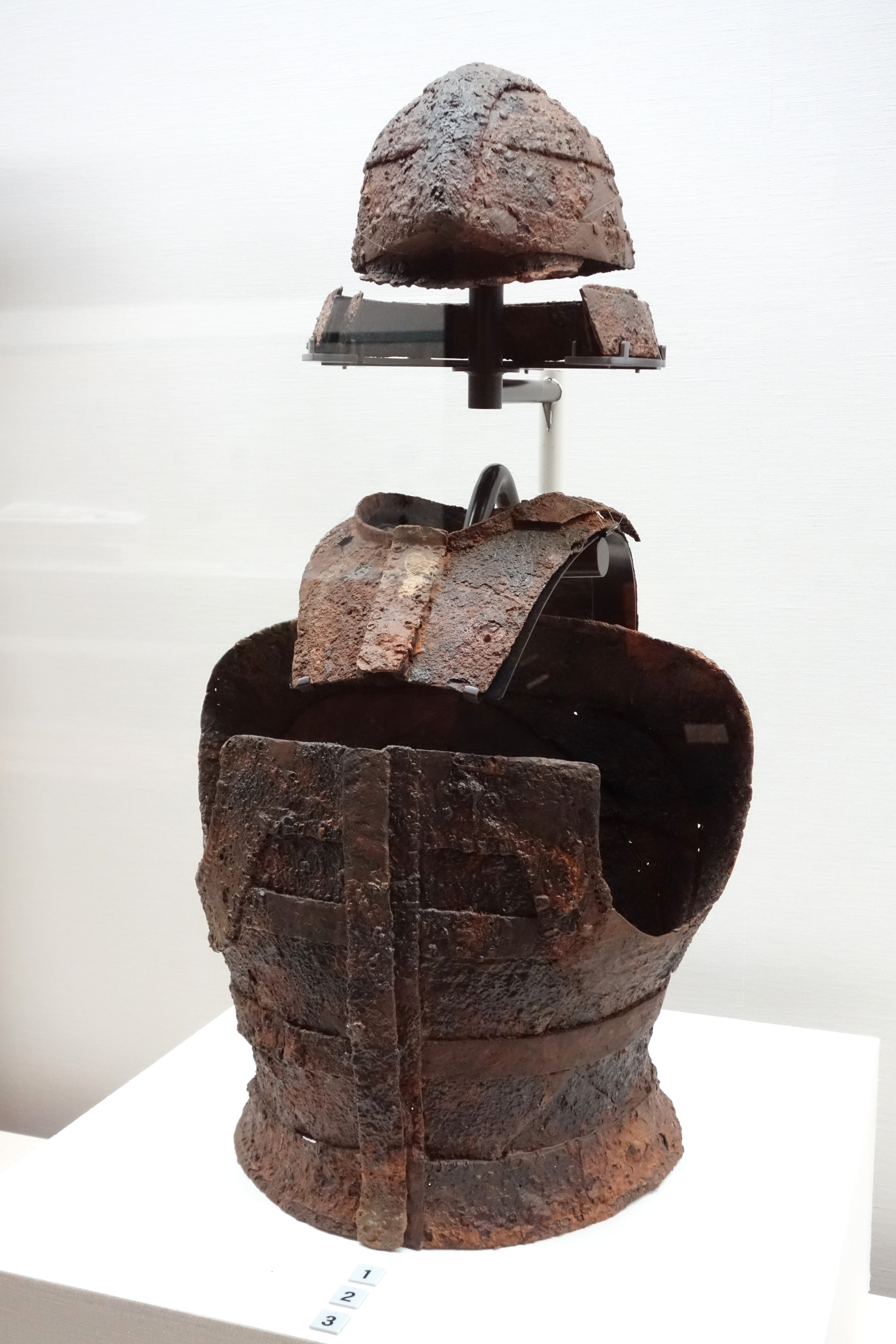
Kofun period armour. 5th century Japan. Tokyo National Museum.

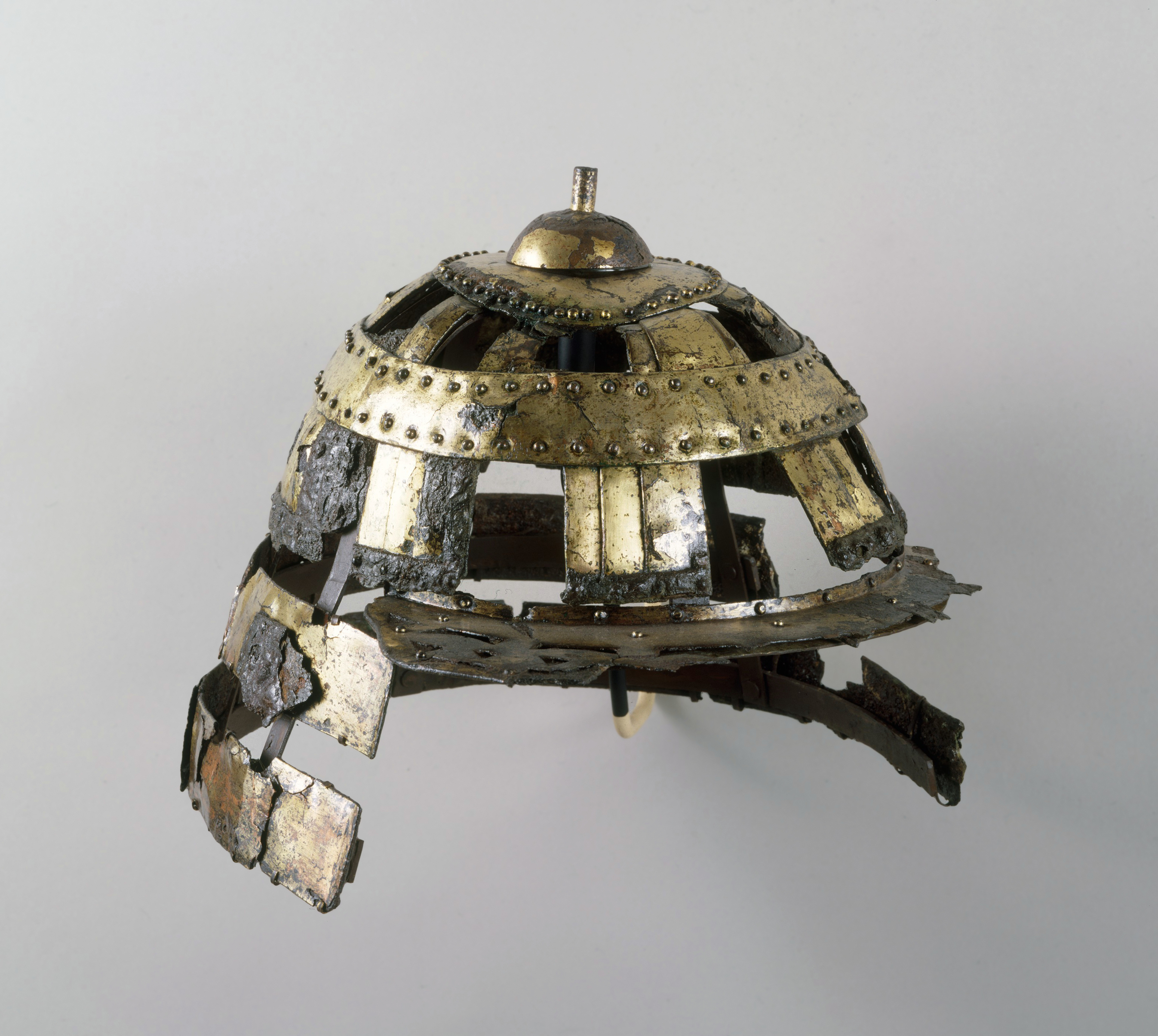
Kofun Helmet Iron And Gilt Copper 5th century, Ise Province.

=== Kozane-gusoku ===
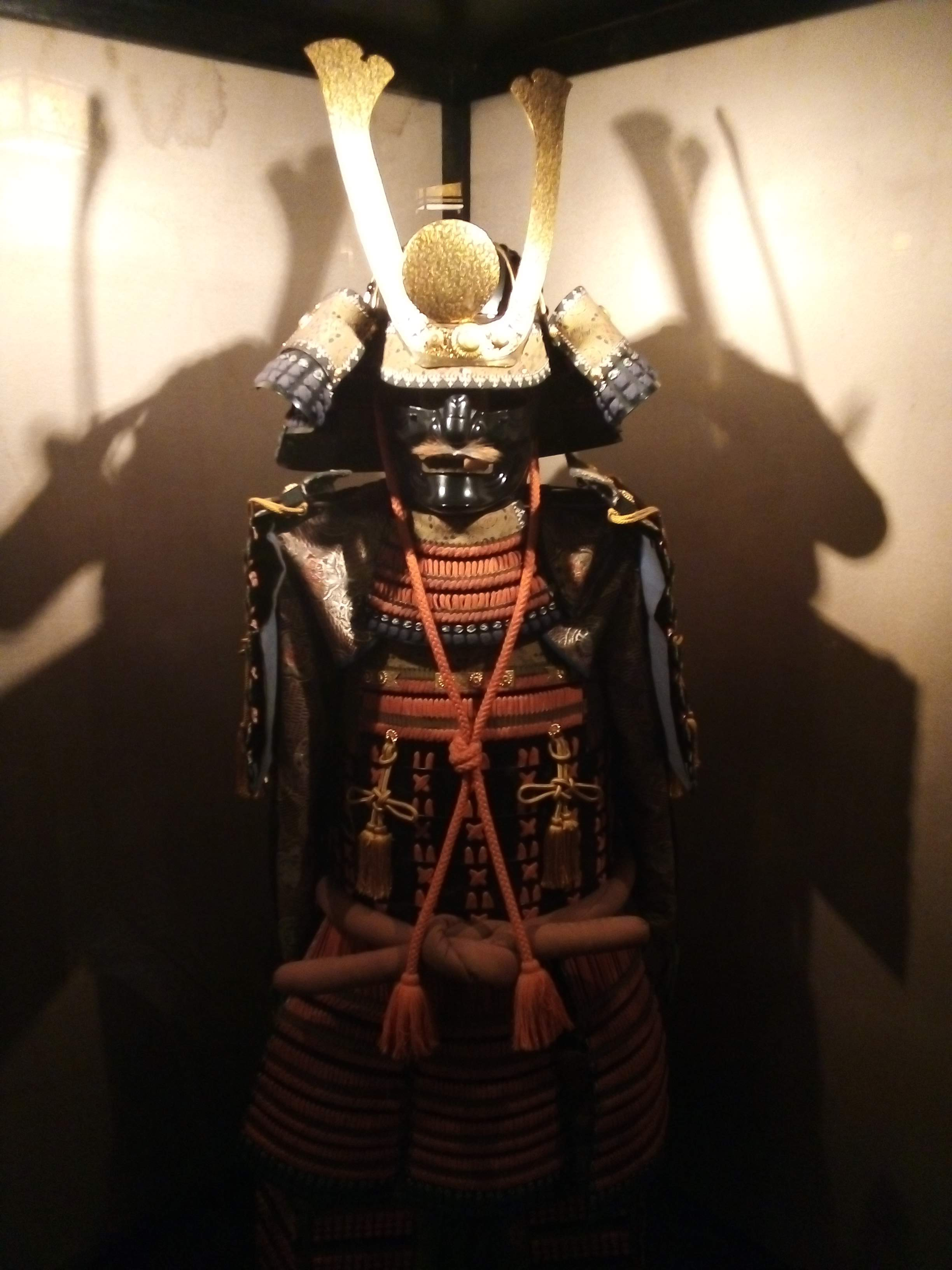
A Kozane-gusoku armour in exposition.

Kozane dou (dō) gusoku, are samurai armours with a lamellar cuirass constructed from individual scales (kozane), old fashioned armours used before the introduction of firearms in Japanese warfare (pre-Sengoku styles).

- Ō-yoroi, old style dou (dō) for mounted samurai, constructed with hon kozane (small individual scales).
- Dō-maru, old style dou (dō) that opened in the back, constructed with hon kozane (small individual scales), later period haramaki dou (dō) were made with armour plates.
- Hon kozane dou (dō) (small individual scales)
- Hon-iyozane dou (dō) or Nuinobe dou (dō) (large individual scales).
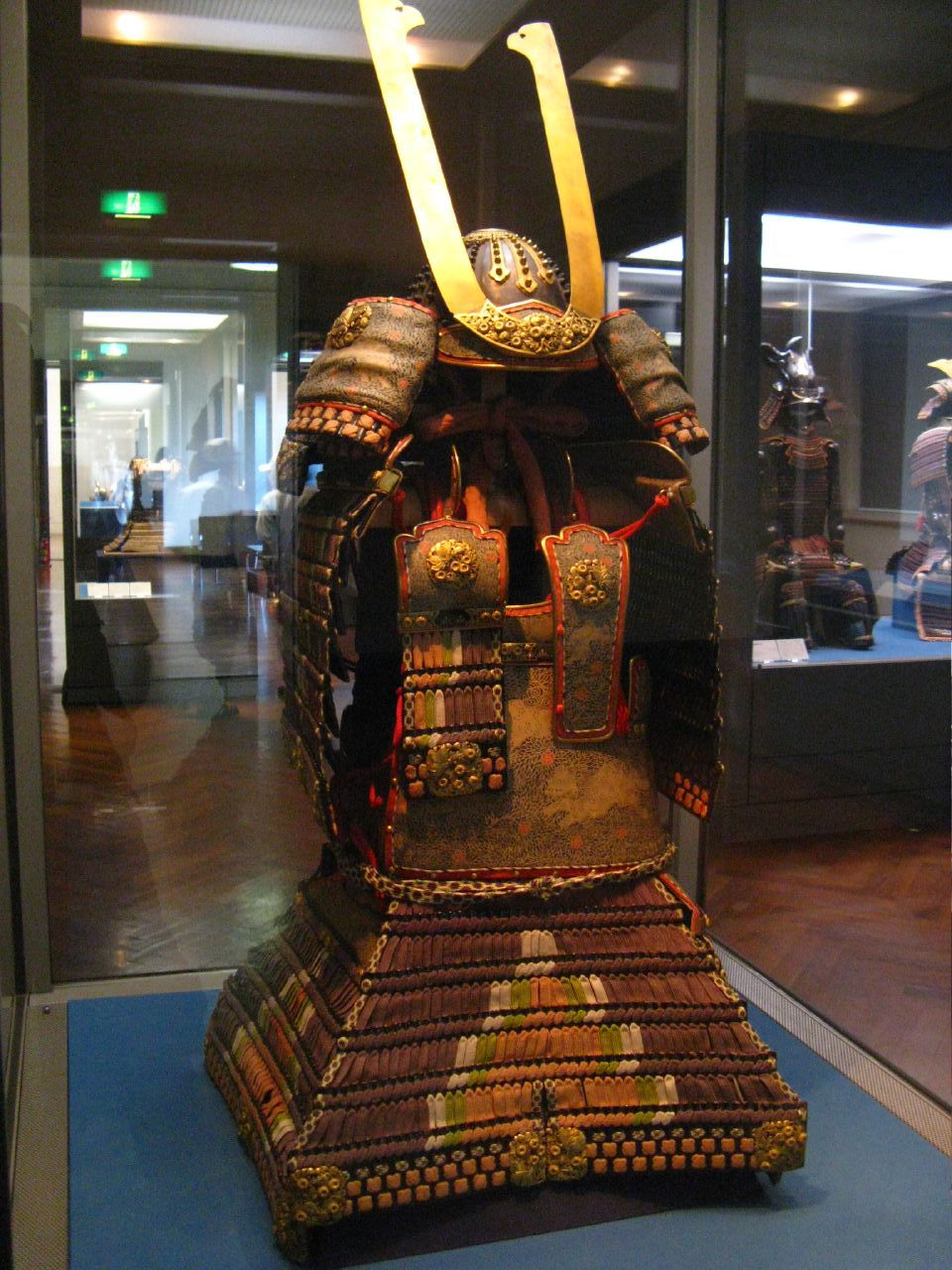
Ō-yoroi, Tokyo National Museum

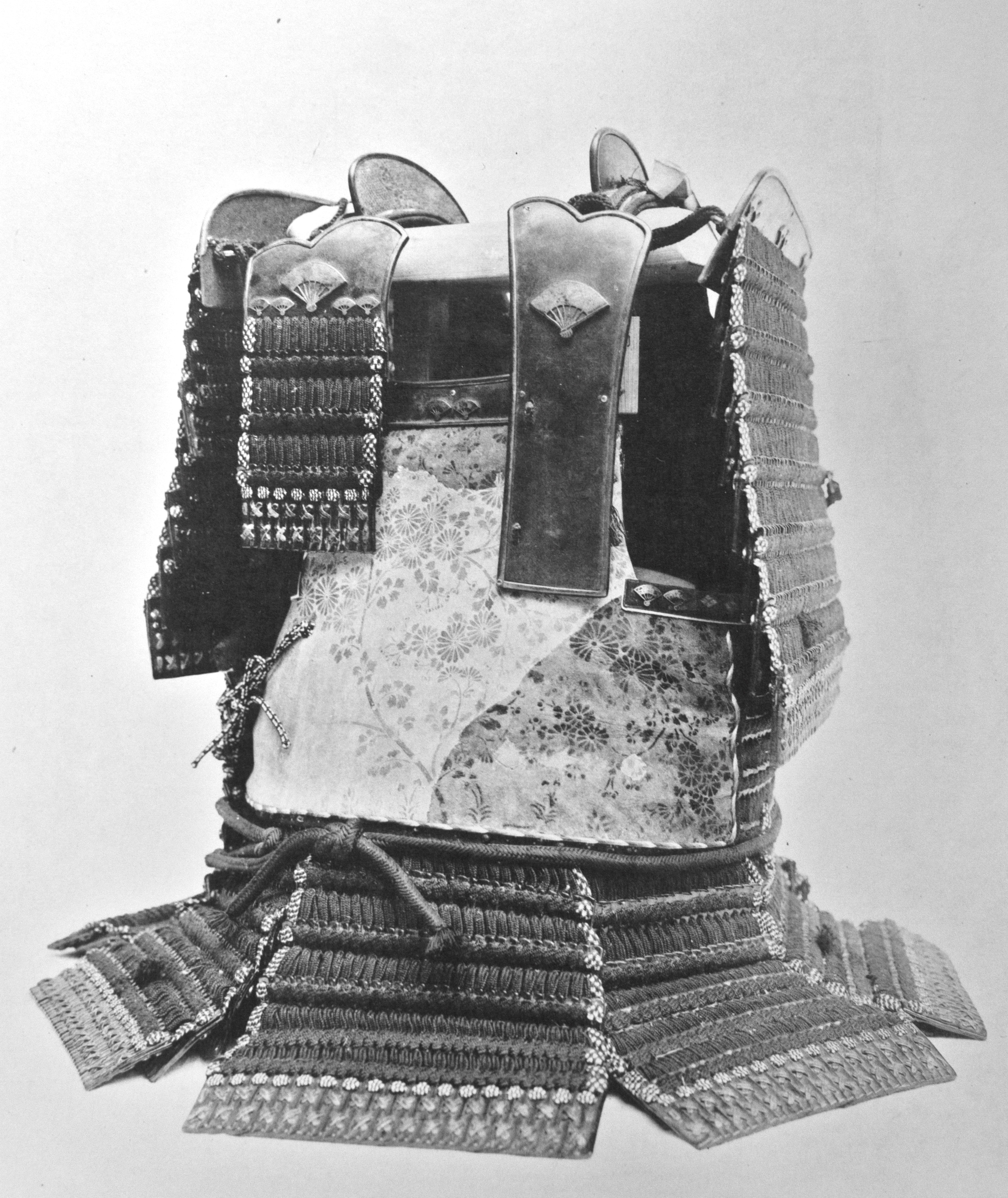
12th century

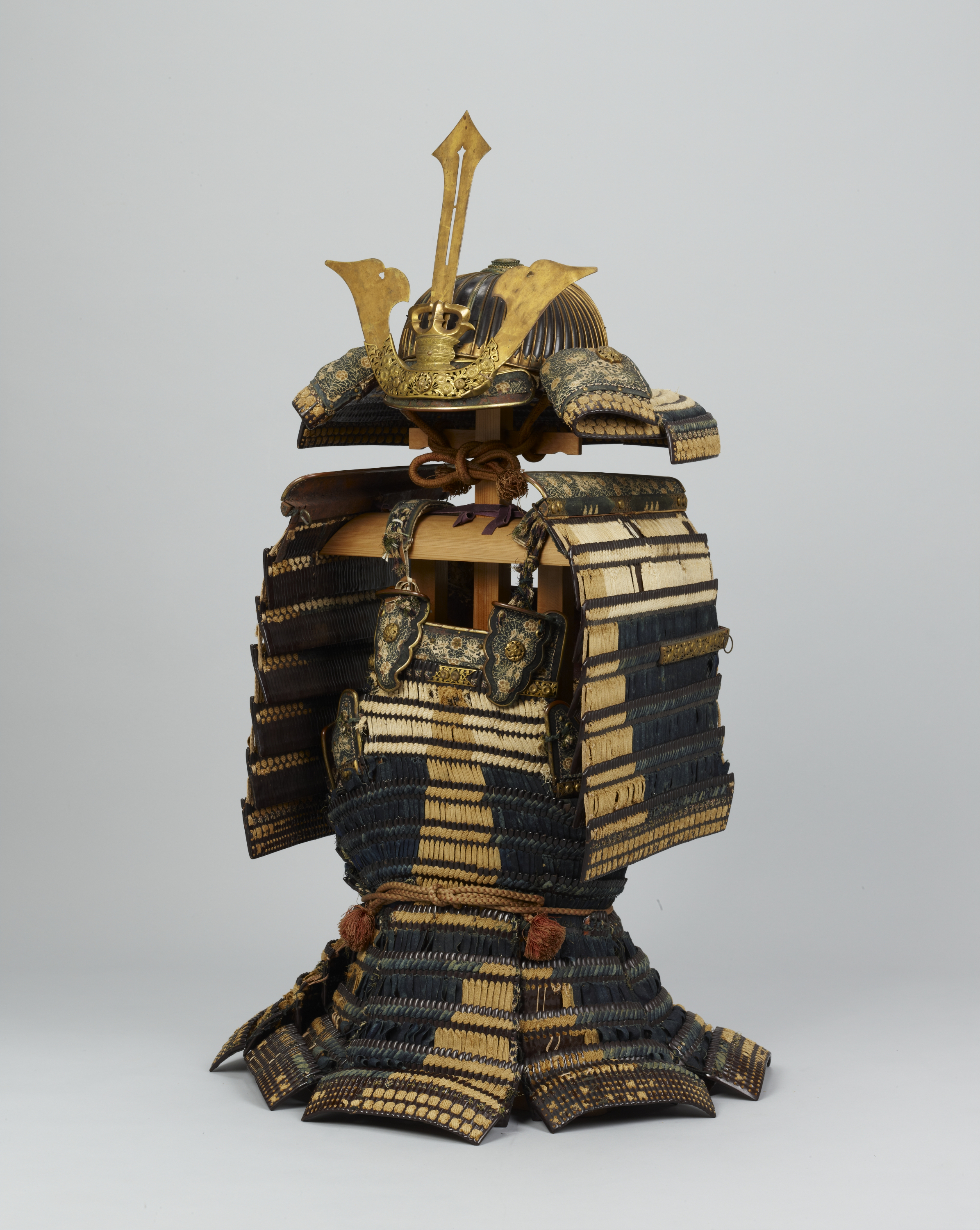
Dō-maru, Muromachi period, 15th century, Important Cultural Property, Tokyo National Museum

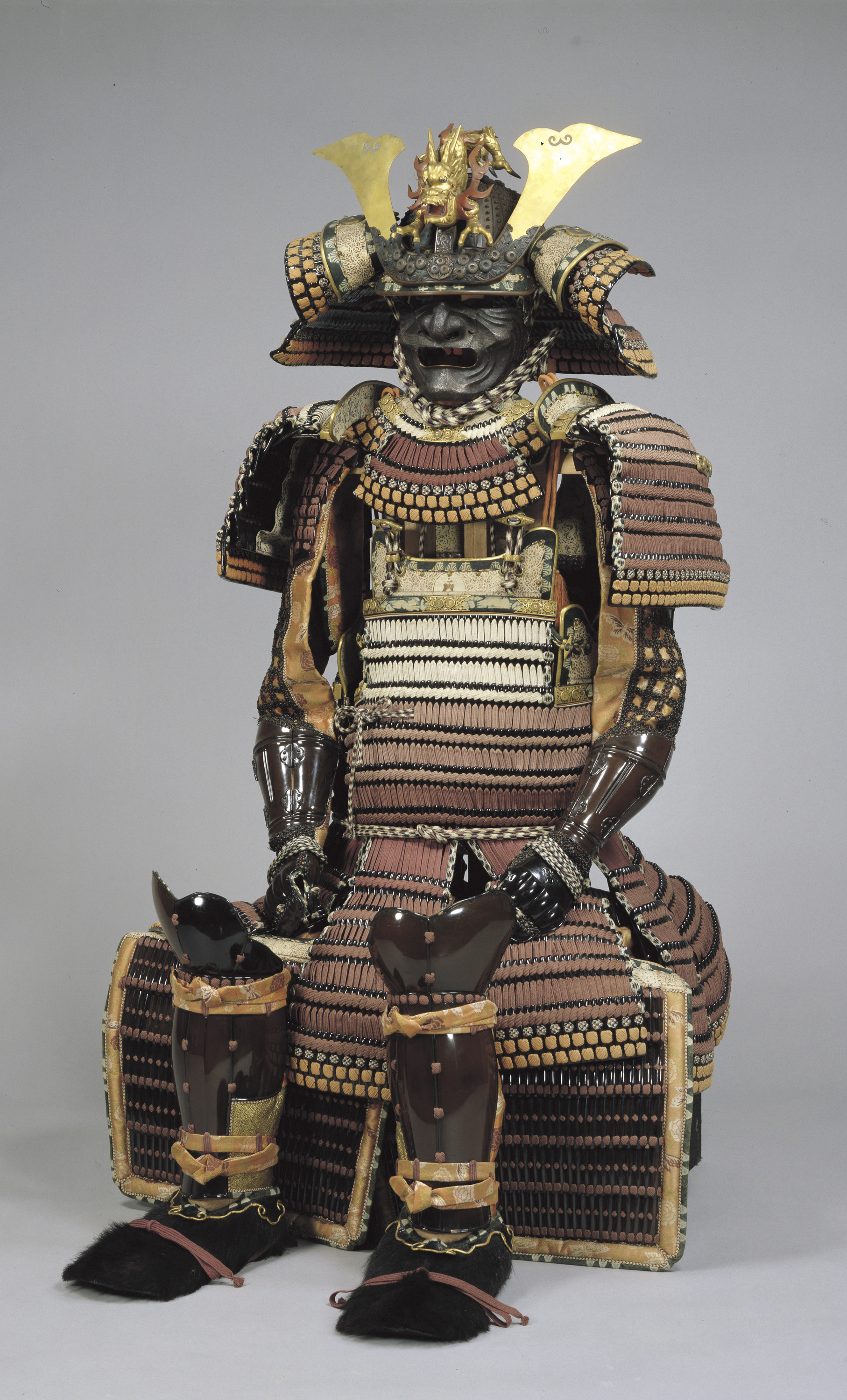
Hon kozane dou (dō) gusoku with a medieval revival style, Edo period, 19th century, Tokyo National Museum

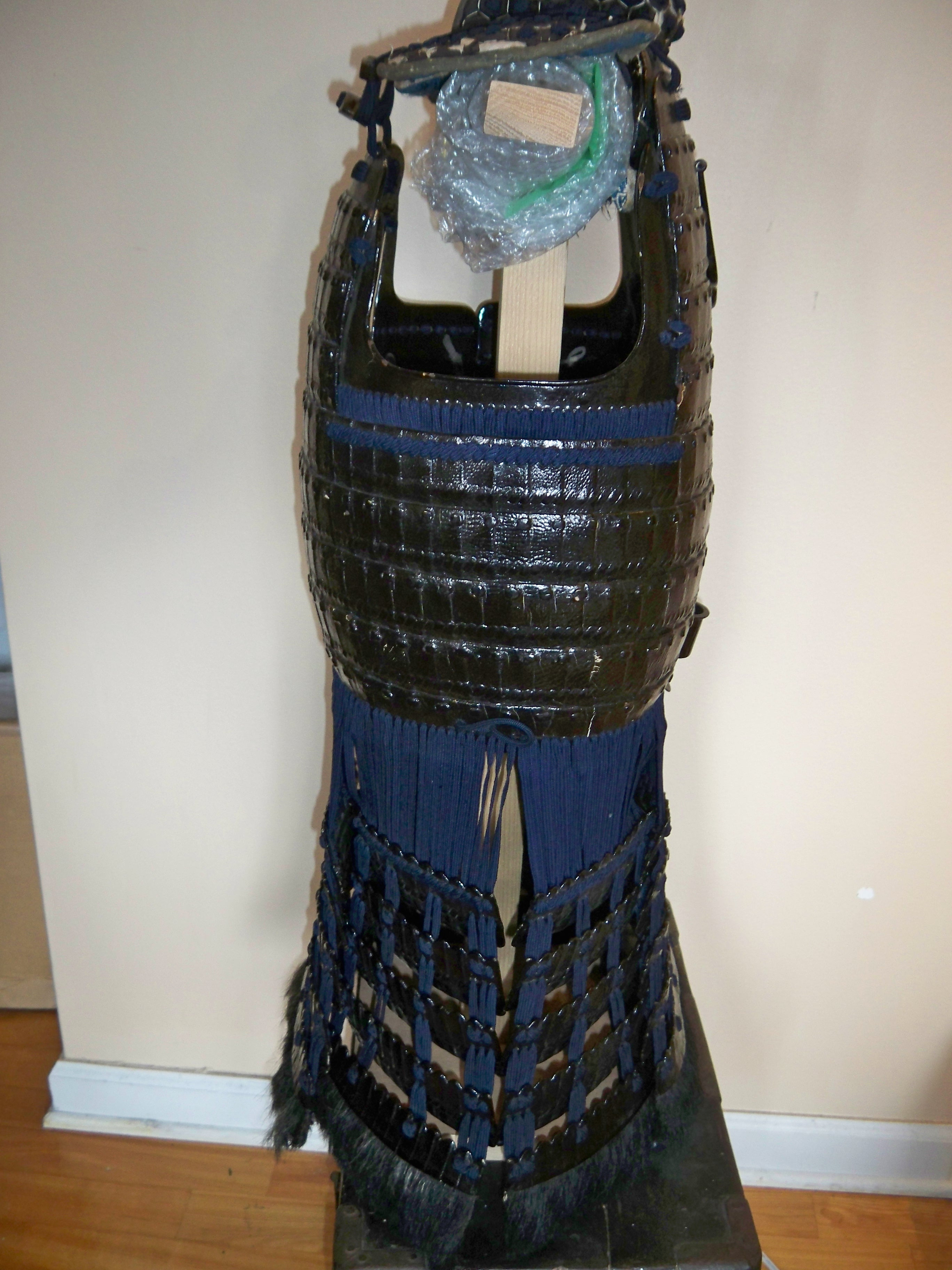
Hon iyozane maru dou (dō), constructed with over 250 true iron large scales. A maru dou (dō) does not have a hinge.

=== Tosei-gusoku ===
Tosei dou (dō) gusoku the so-called "modern armours" made from iron plates (ita-mono) instead of individual scales (kozane). Tosei-gusoku became prominent starting in the 1500s due to the advent of fire arms, new fighting tactics and the need for additional protection.

- Okegawa Dou (dō) gusoku – (tub-sided), refers to the tub-like shape of the dou (dō). There are two types of okegawa dou (dō): yokohagi (horizontal lames), and tatehagi (vertical lames).
- Hishinui dou (dō) or Hishi-toji dou (dō) – chest armour with rows of prominent cross knots, usually an okegawa dou (dō).
- Munemenui dou (dō) or Unamenui dou (dō) – chest armour with a running stitch that goes horizontally across the surface of the dou (dō). This stitch of lacing runs along the surface of the lame looking like a dotted line paralleling the top.
- Dangae dou (dō) gusoku – meaning "step-changing", a combination of two or more styles.
- Hotoke dou (dō) gusoku – chest armour which is smooth and shows no signs of lames.
- Nio dou (dō) – embossed to resemble the emaciated torso of a starving monk or old man.
- Katahada-nugi dou (dō) – embossed to resemble a half-naked torso.
- Yukinoshita or Sendai dou (dō) – five plate, four hinge (go-mai) chest armour in the sendai or yukinoshita style.
- Hatomune dou (dō) gusoku – (pigeon-breast chest armour or cuirass) were inspired by European peascod breastplate armour. Hatomune dou (dō) have a sharp central ridge running vertically down the front.
- Uchidashi dou (dō) gusoku – Embossed or hammered out relief on the front.
- Nanban dou (dō) gusoku – Armour made on the base of late European armour
- Mōgami dou (dō) – five-plate, four hinge (go mai) chest armours with solid lames which are laced with sugake odoshi instead of being riveted.
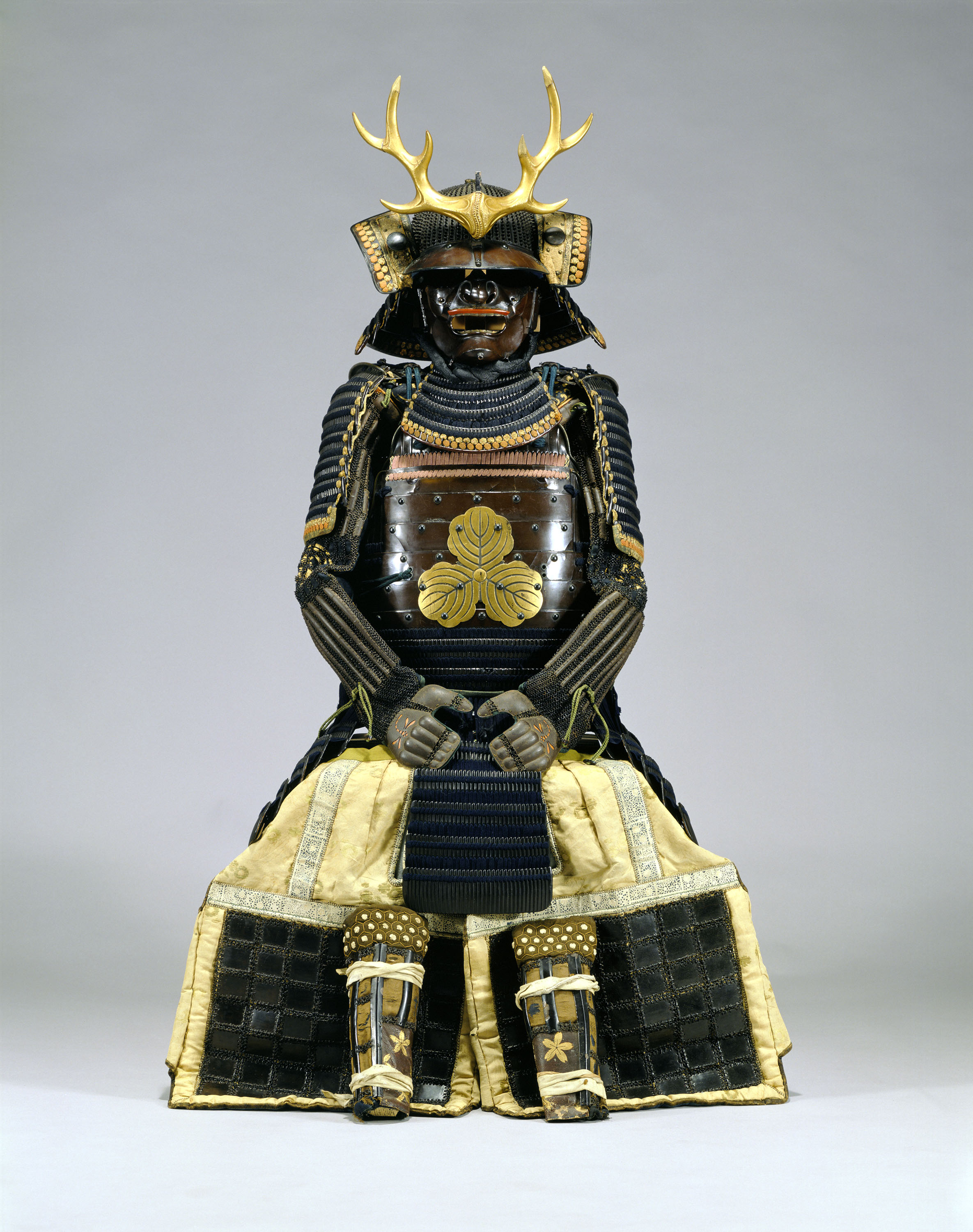
Okegawa Dou (dō) gusoku, Edo period, 19th century, Kyushu National Museum.

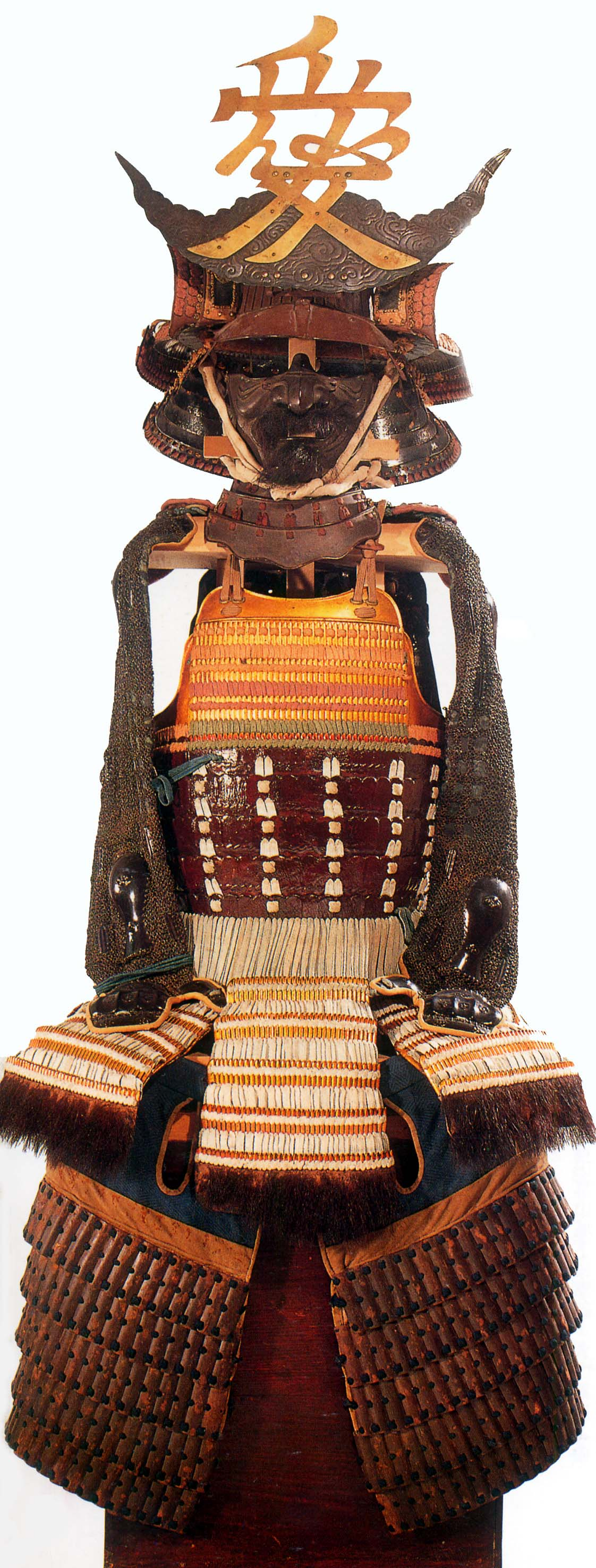
Dangae dou (dō) gusoku. Uesugi shrine, Japan.

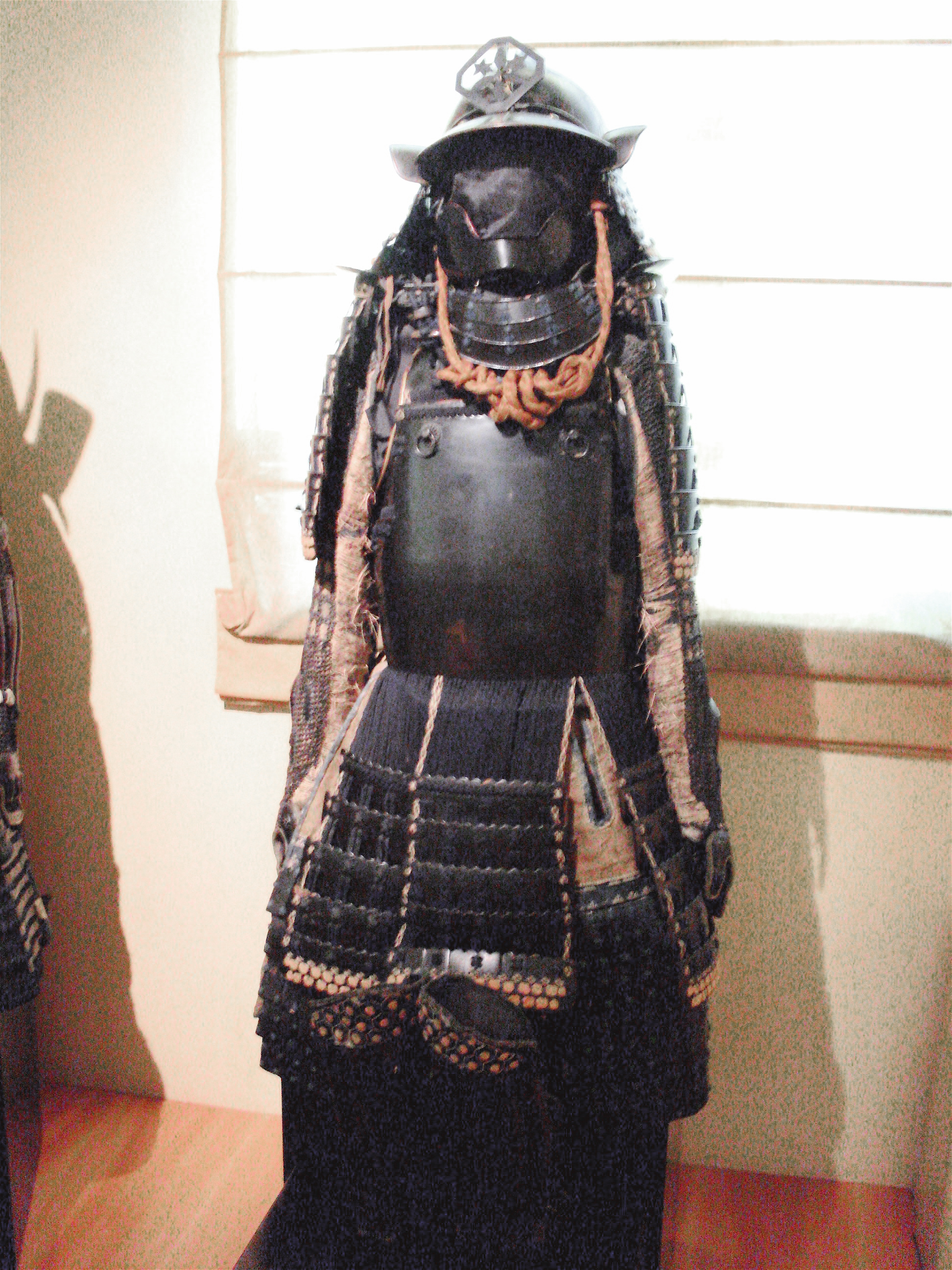
Hotoke dou (dō) gusoku.

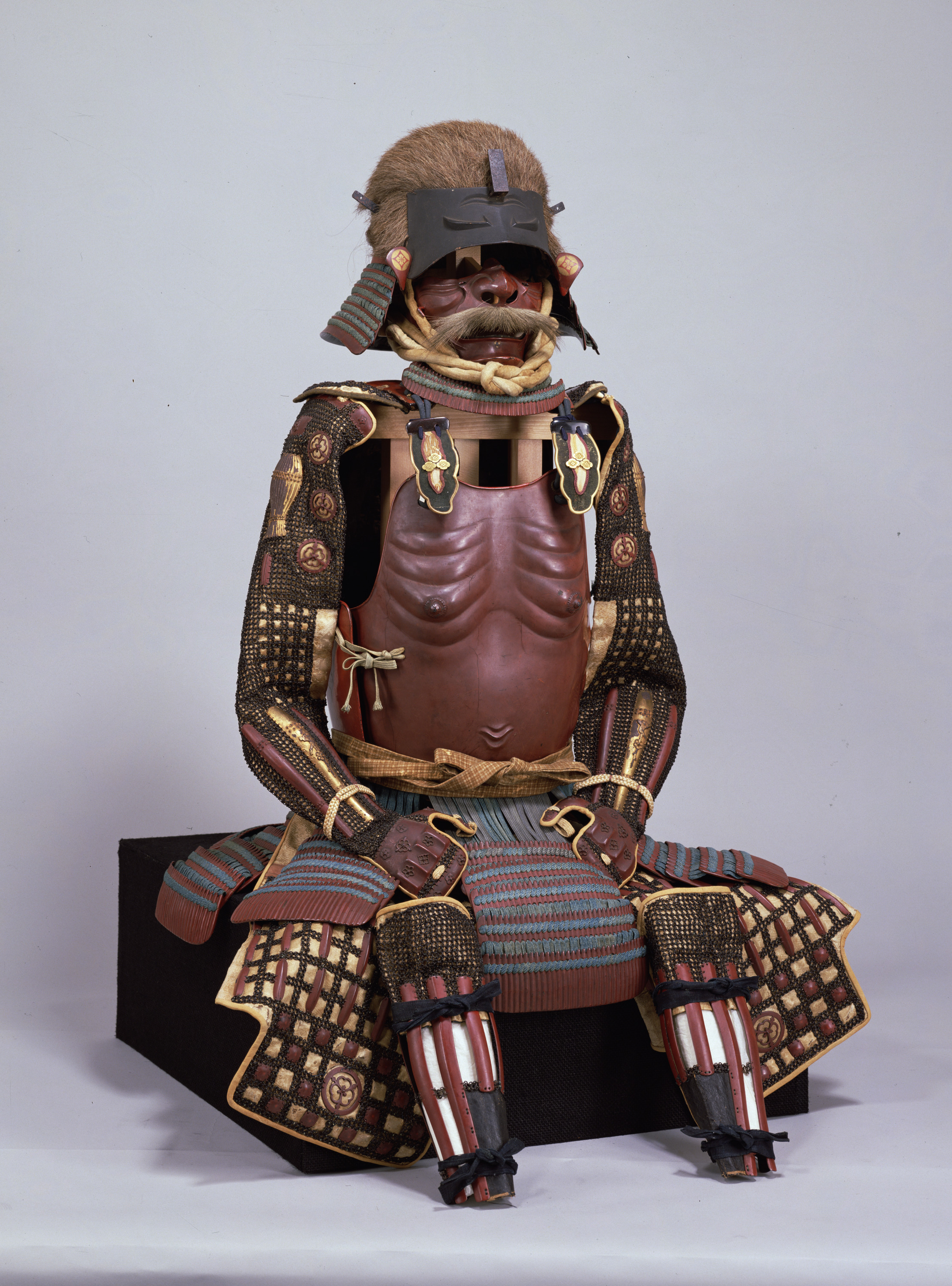
Nio dou (dō) gusoku, Azuchi-Momoyama period, 16th century, Tokyo National Museum.

=== Other types ===
- Tatami-gusoku — Folding portable armour made from karuta armour (small square or rectangular plates) or kikko armour (small hexagon plates). Kusari gusoku (chain armour) is another form of tatami armour. Chochin kabuto (collapsible helmets) and hachi gane ( forehead protectors) that folded were also tatami armour.
- Tameshi-gusoku — bullet tested armour
- Gyorin kozane-gusoku — Scale armour
- Nanban-gusoku — western-inspired armour
- Okasi-gusoku — lending or borrowing armour or munition armour, usually made for ashigaru (it might be Tatami-do or any plain basic armour) often marked with clan insignia (mon).
- Uma yoroi, horse armour used in the Edo period for parades.
- Kusari gusoku Chain armour, armour made entirely of or the majority of the armour being made from kusari (chain mail) sewn to cloth.
- Kigote, a general term for several varieties of kote extended or completed by the addition of erisuwari (padded collar), kara-ate (shoulder pads) and wakibiki (armpit protectors). Examples of the kigote are the kote haramaki (kote which covers the belly), tominaga kote (kote that connect to each other in the front and back), sashinuki kote (kote made in the form of a short jacket).
- Yoroi katabira, armored jackets of various styles and sizes. Katabira were armored with kikko, hexagon armor plates, karuta, square or rectangular armor plates, or kusari, chain armor, or a combination of these armors.
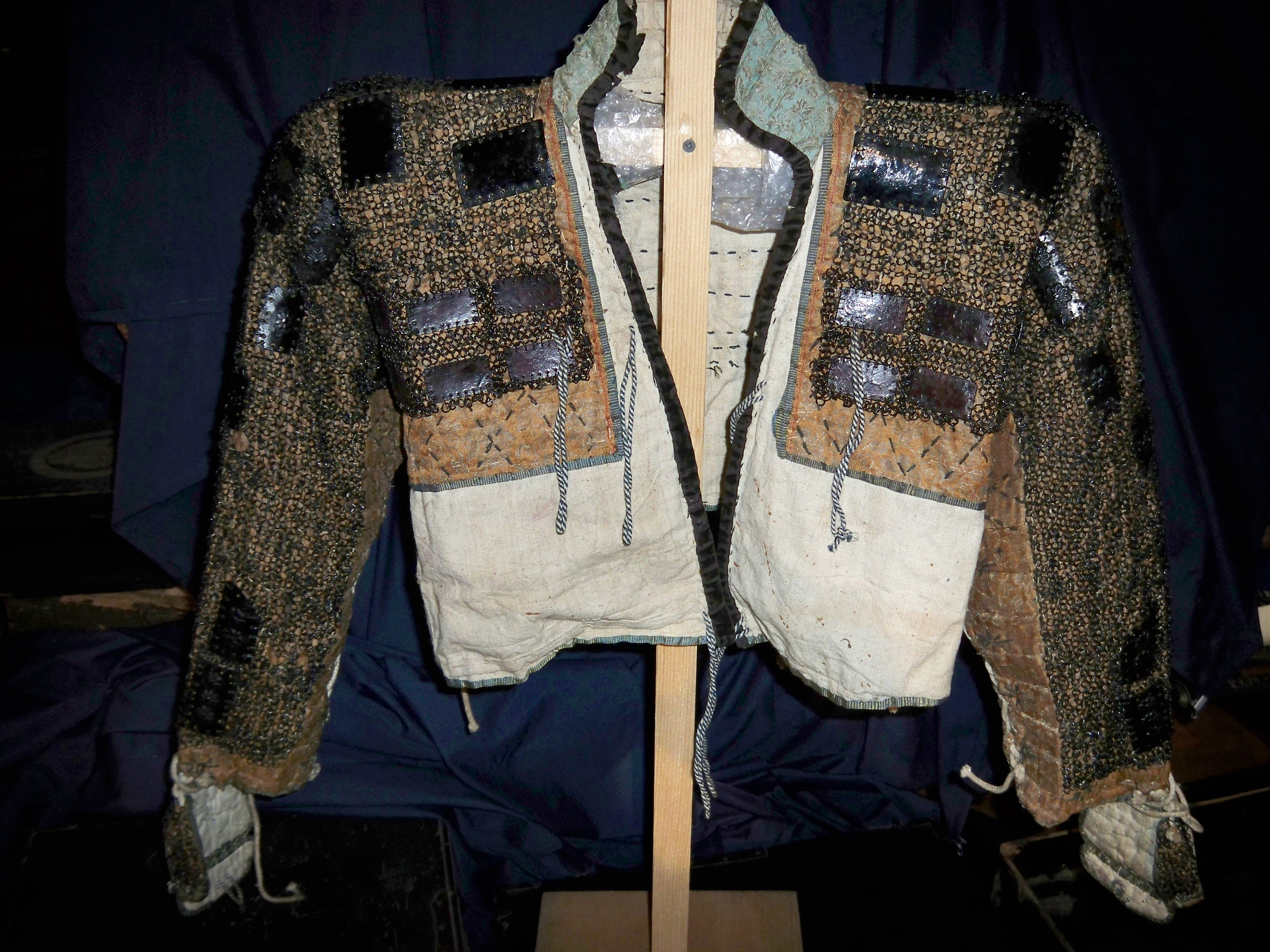
Antique Japanese (samurai) Edo period karuta sashinuki style kote. Kote made in one piece in the form of a short Jacket.

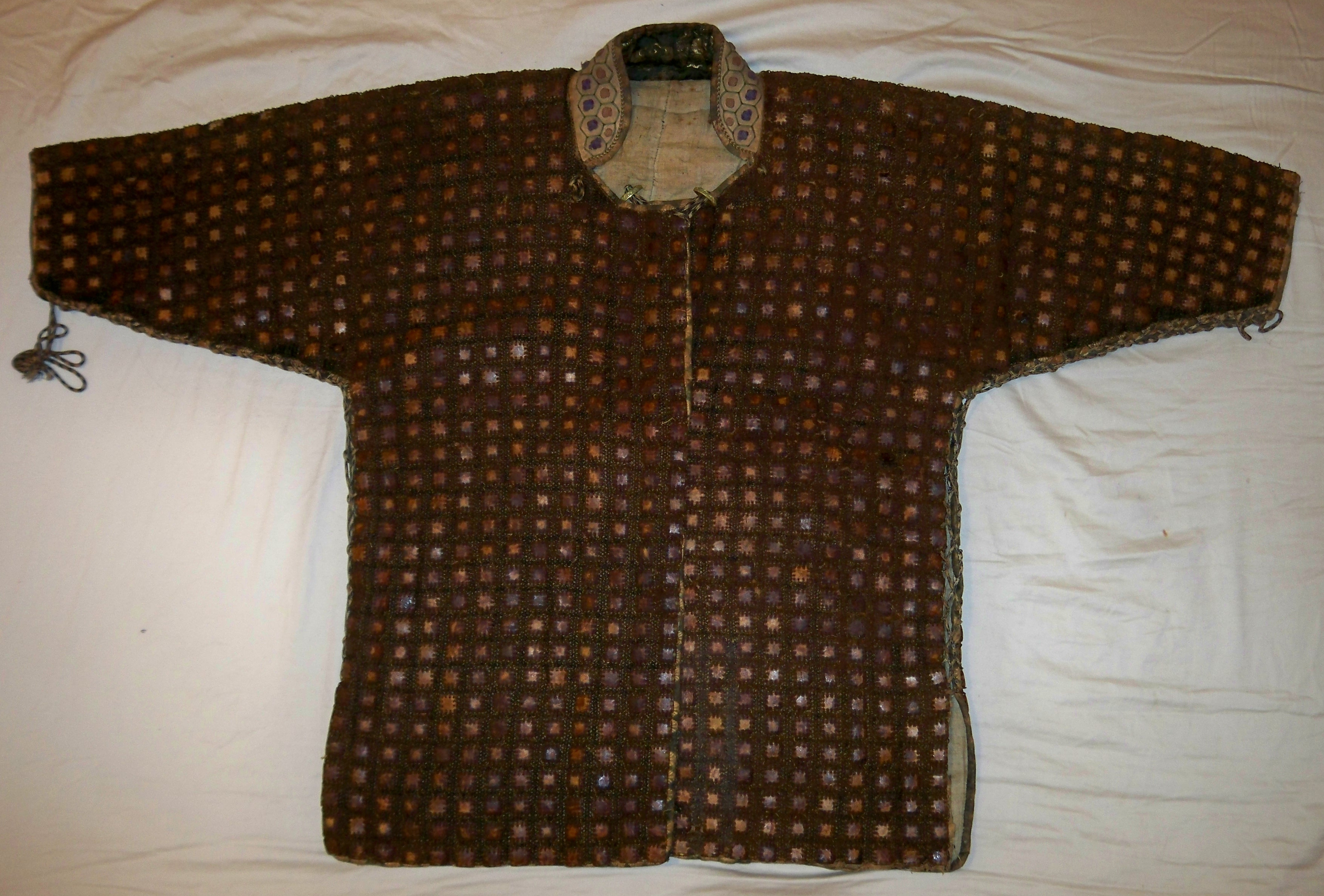
Kusari and karuta katabira. An armored jacket made with over 2000 leather (nerigawa) armor squares connected to each other by chain armor (kusari) .

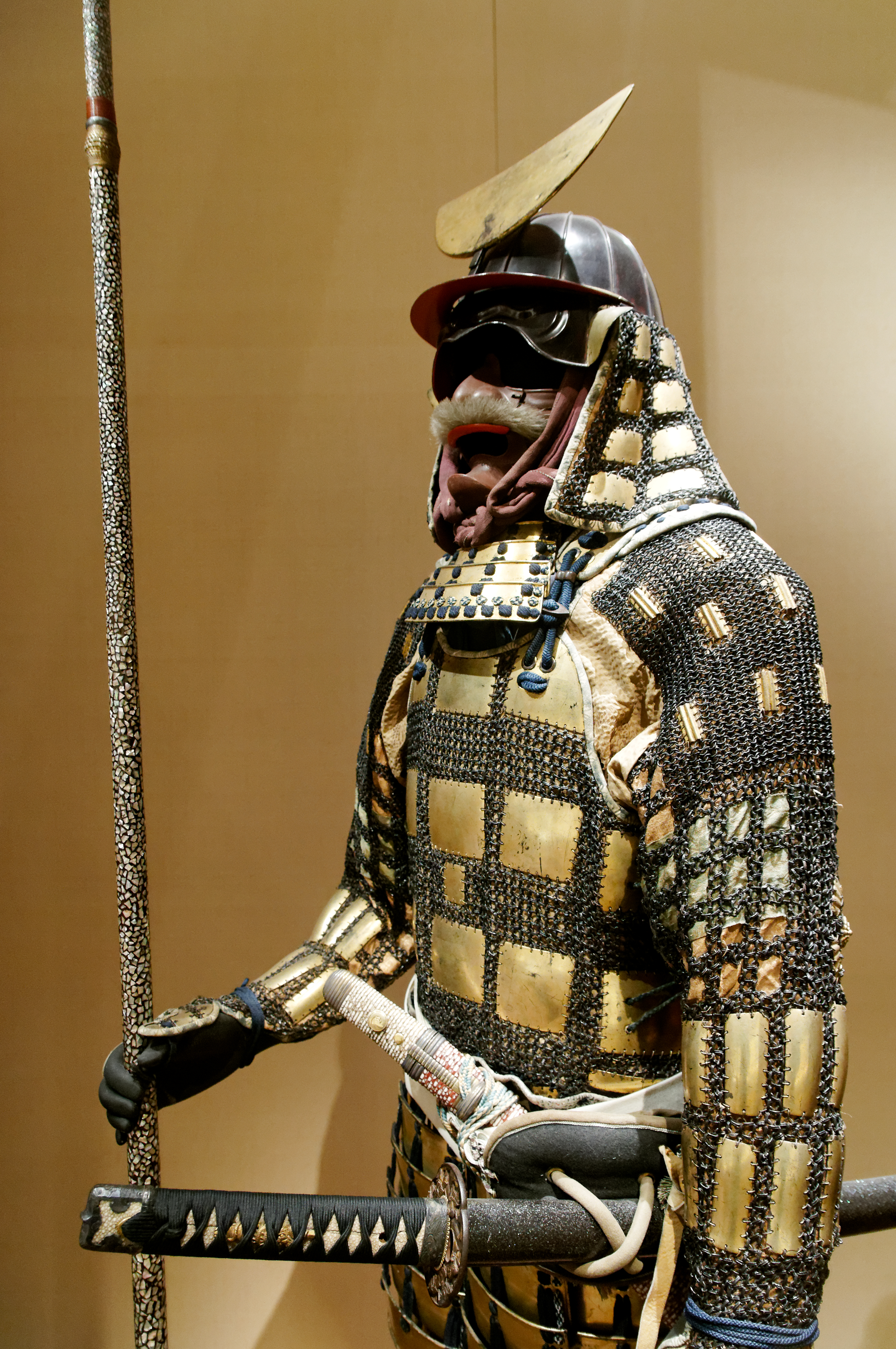
Karuta tatami gusoku.

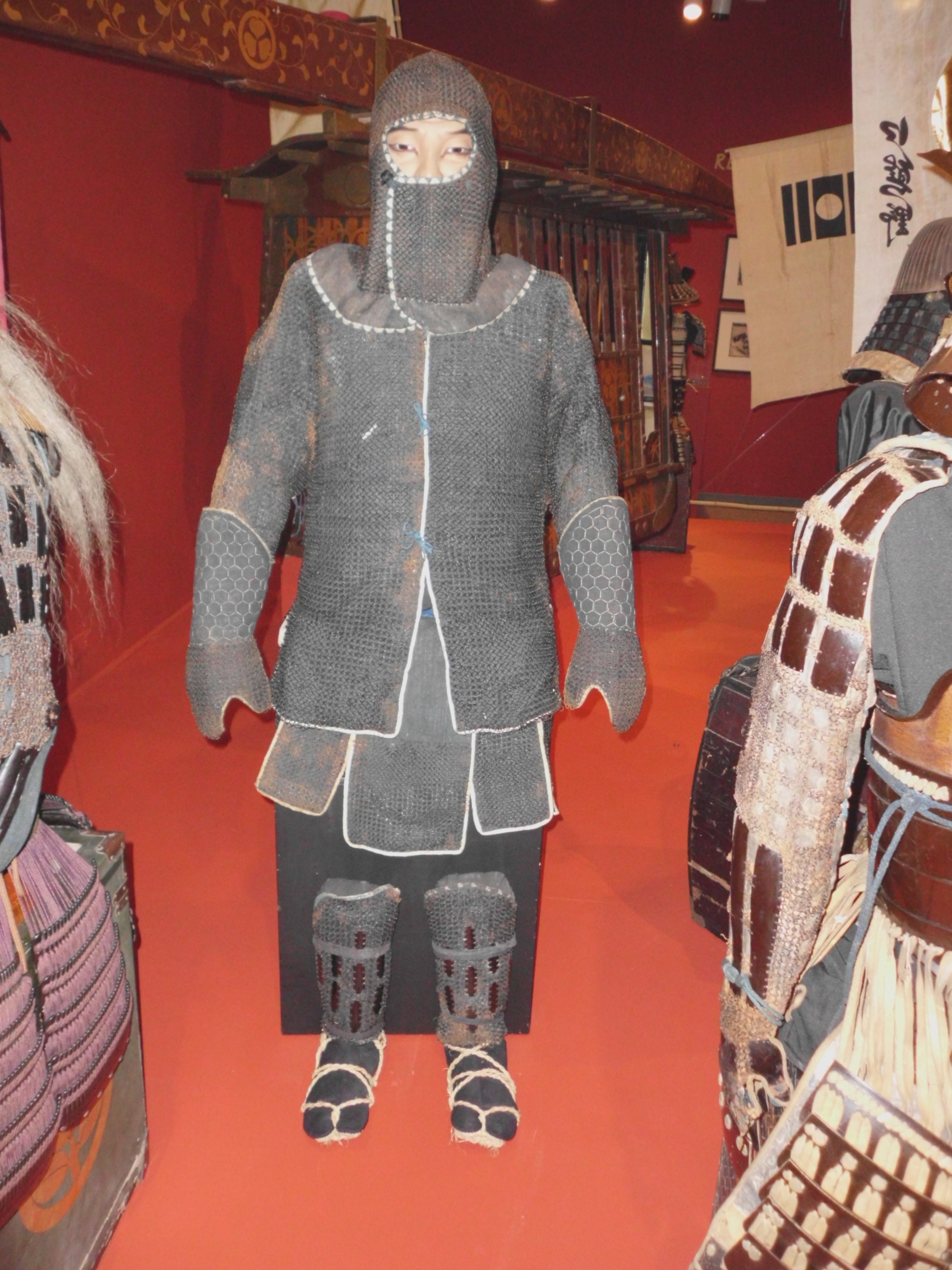
Full composite suit of Edo period samurai chain armour kusari gusoku from the Return of the Samurai exhibit. Art Gallery of Greater Victoria (2010) Victoria, British Columbia, Canada

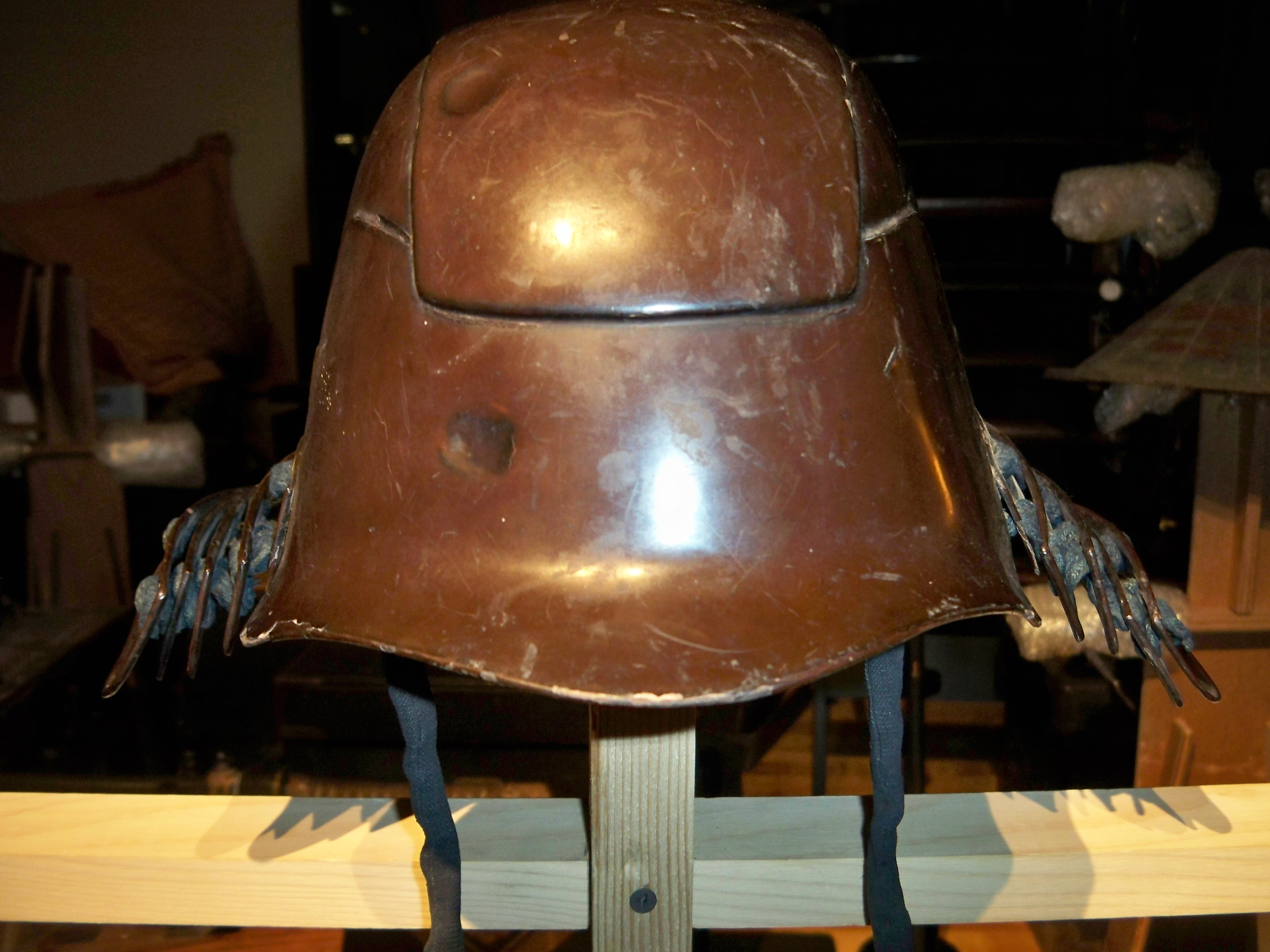
Zunari kabuto with bullet marks from being tested (tameshi).

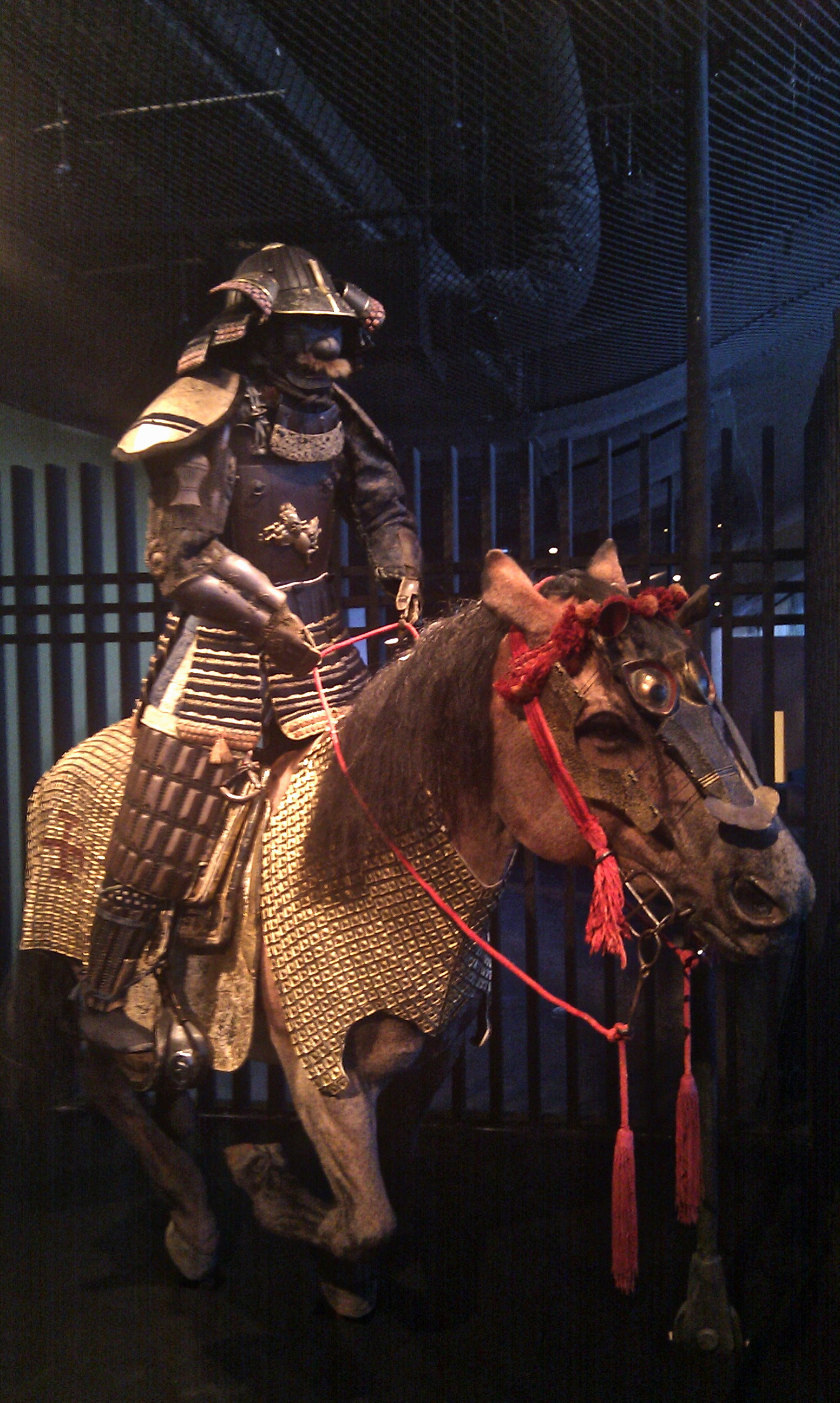
Uma yoroi/bagai, horse armor.

== Individual samurai armor parts ==
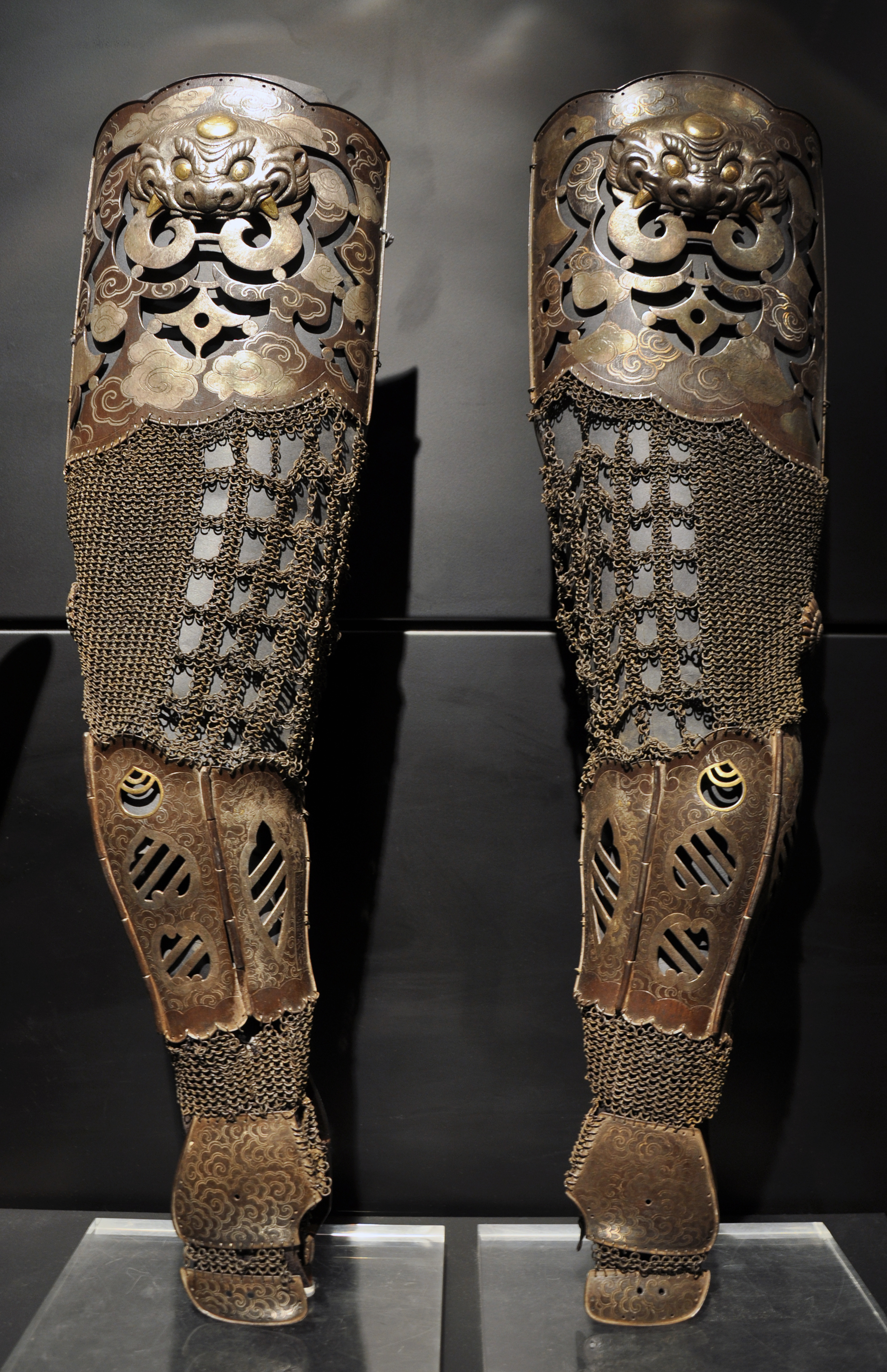
Antique Japanese samurai Edo period kote, arm protection with lacquered iron plates connected with chain armor kusari.

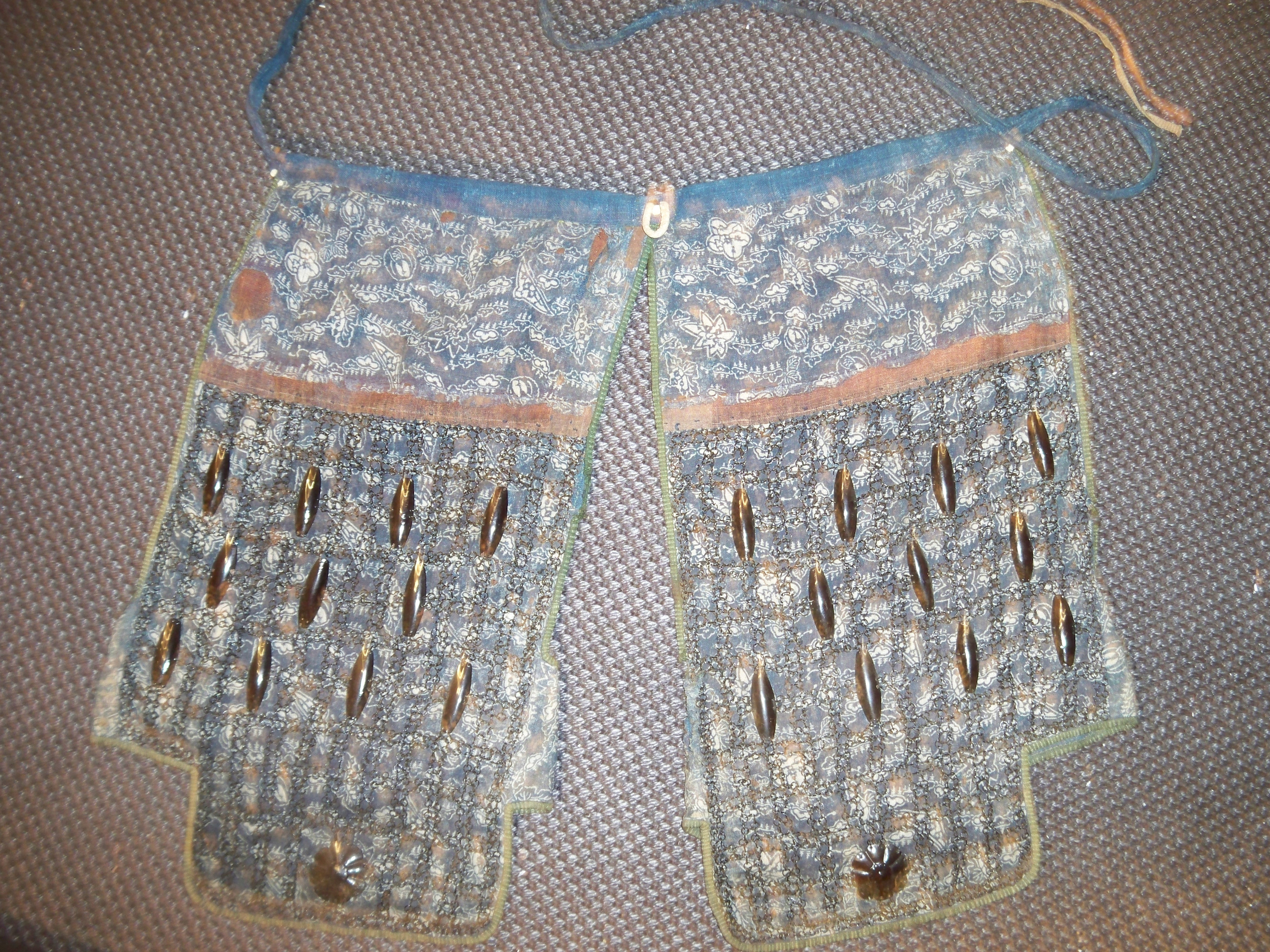
Antique Japanese samurai Edo period haidate, thigh protection with small lacquered iron plates connected by chain armor kusari sewn to cloth.

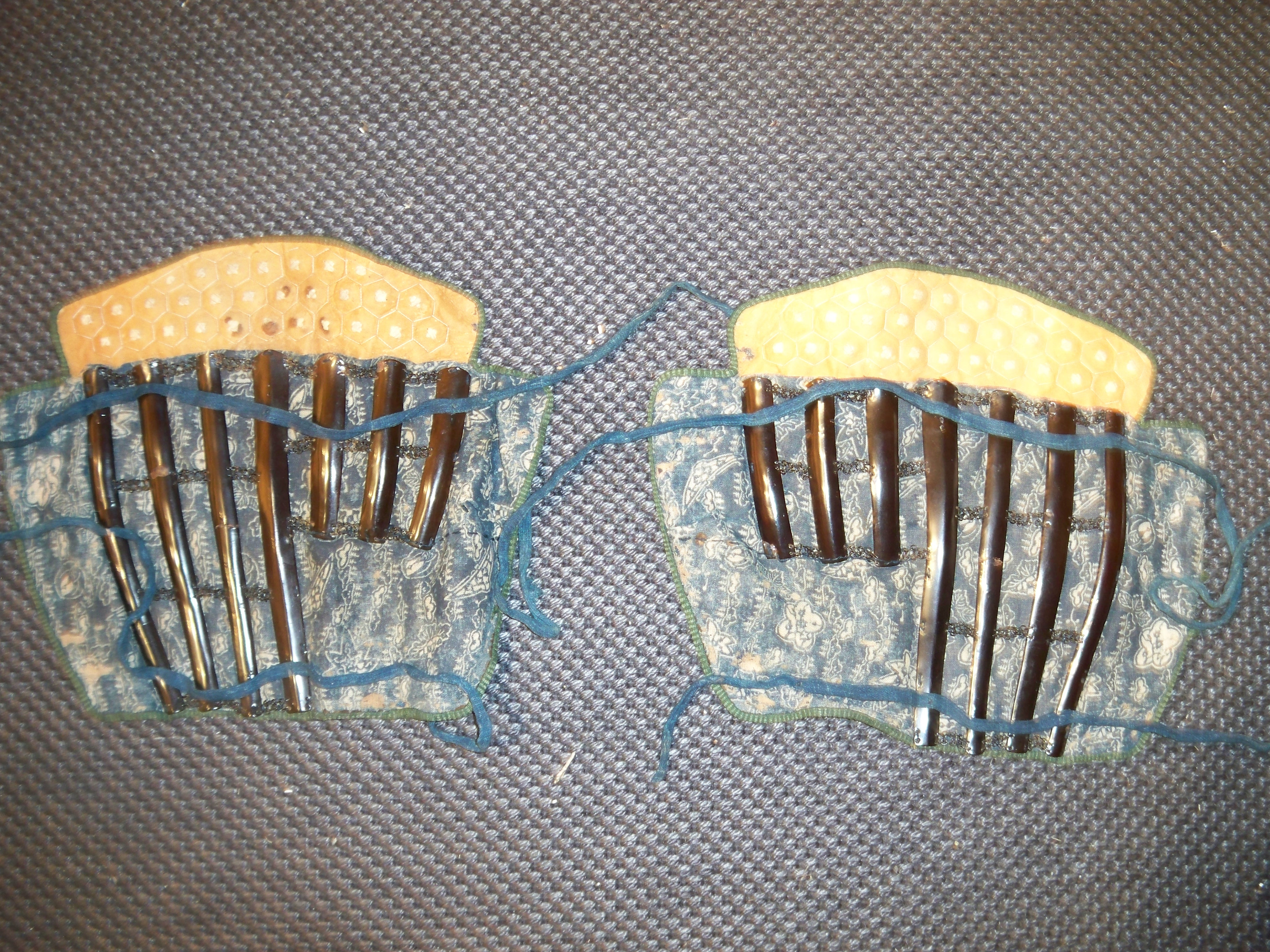
Antique Japanese samurai Edo Period suneate, shin protection with iron splints shino connected by chain armor kusari sewn to cloth, with small hexagon armor plates kikko protecting the knees.

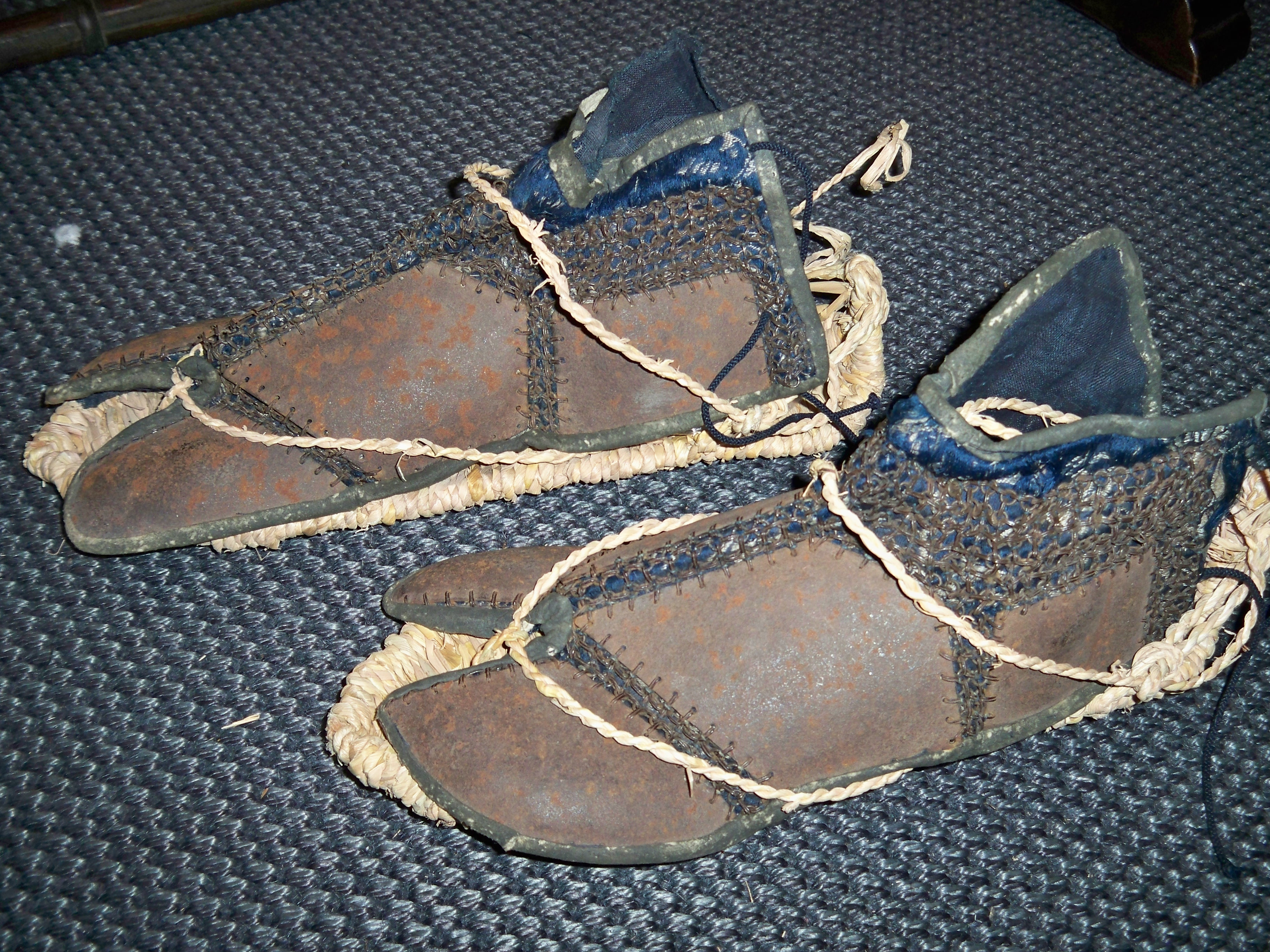
Antique Japanese samurai Edo period kôgake, armored tabi foot coverings, iron plates connected by chain armor kusari and sewn to cloth.

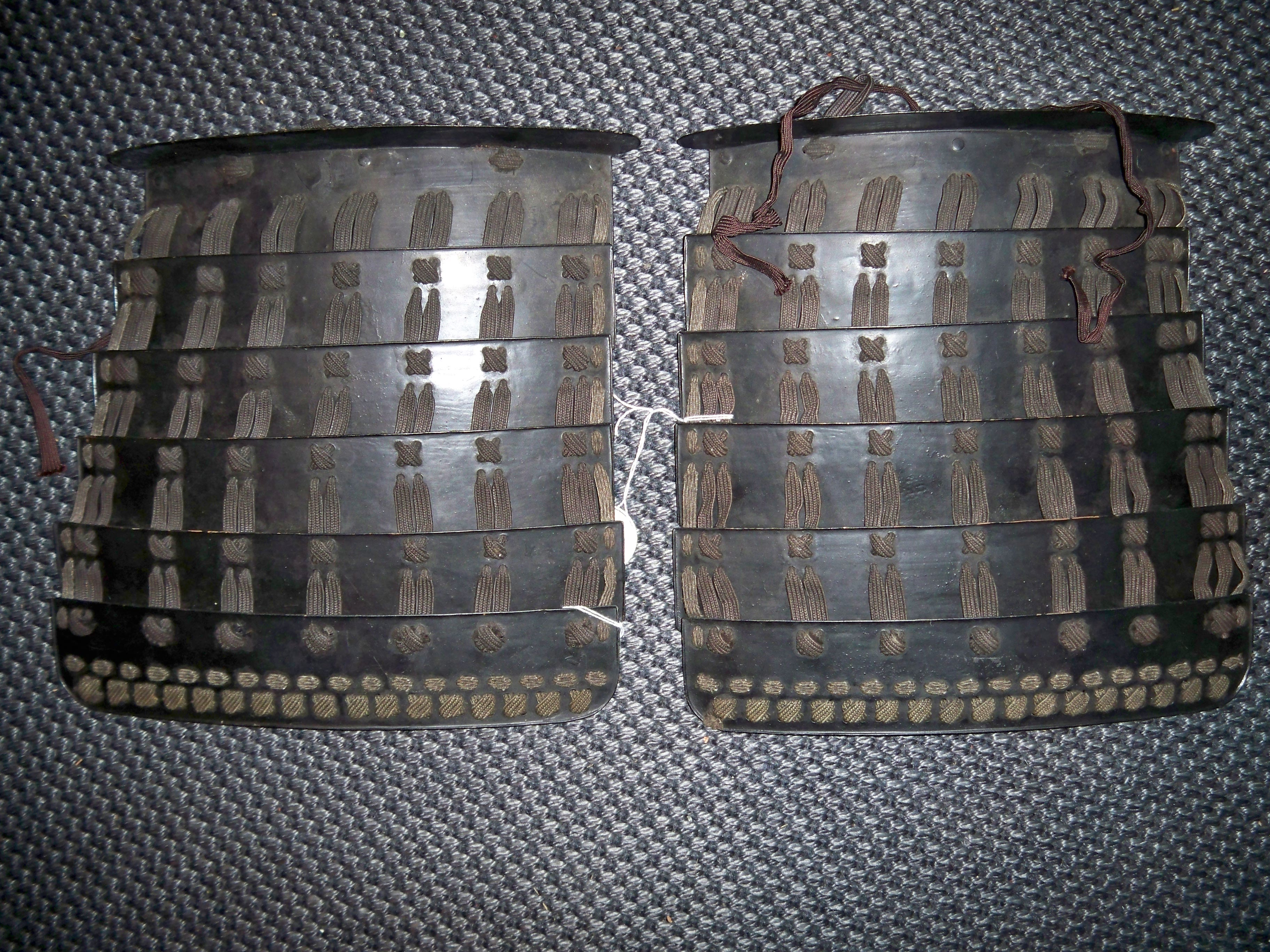
Antique Japanese sode, iron plate shoulder protectors.

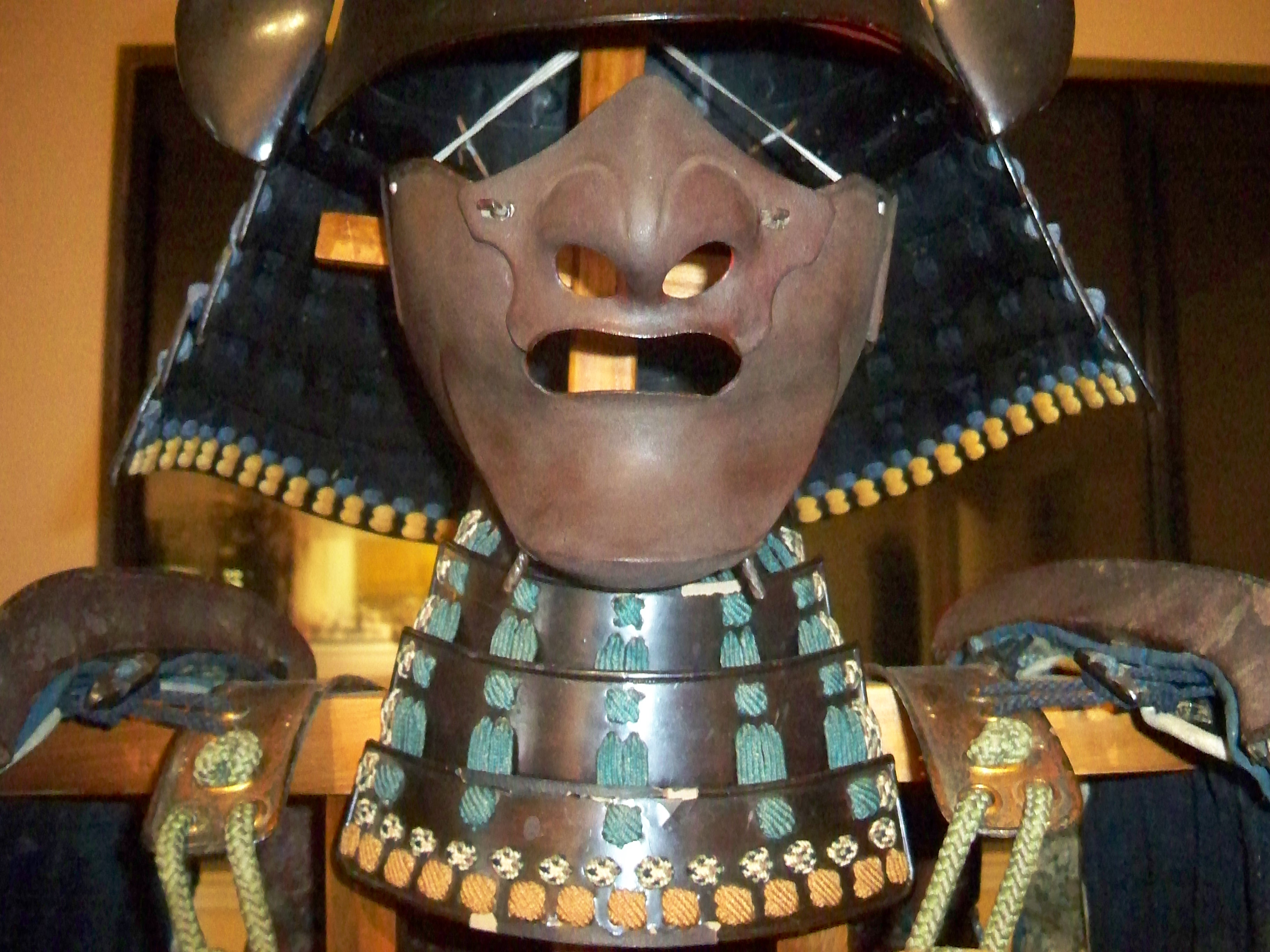
Samurai Menpō, an iron mask with an iron plate throat guard yodare-kake.

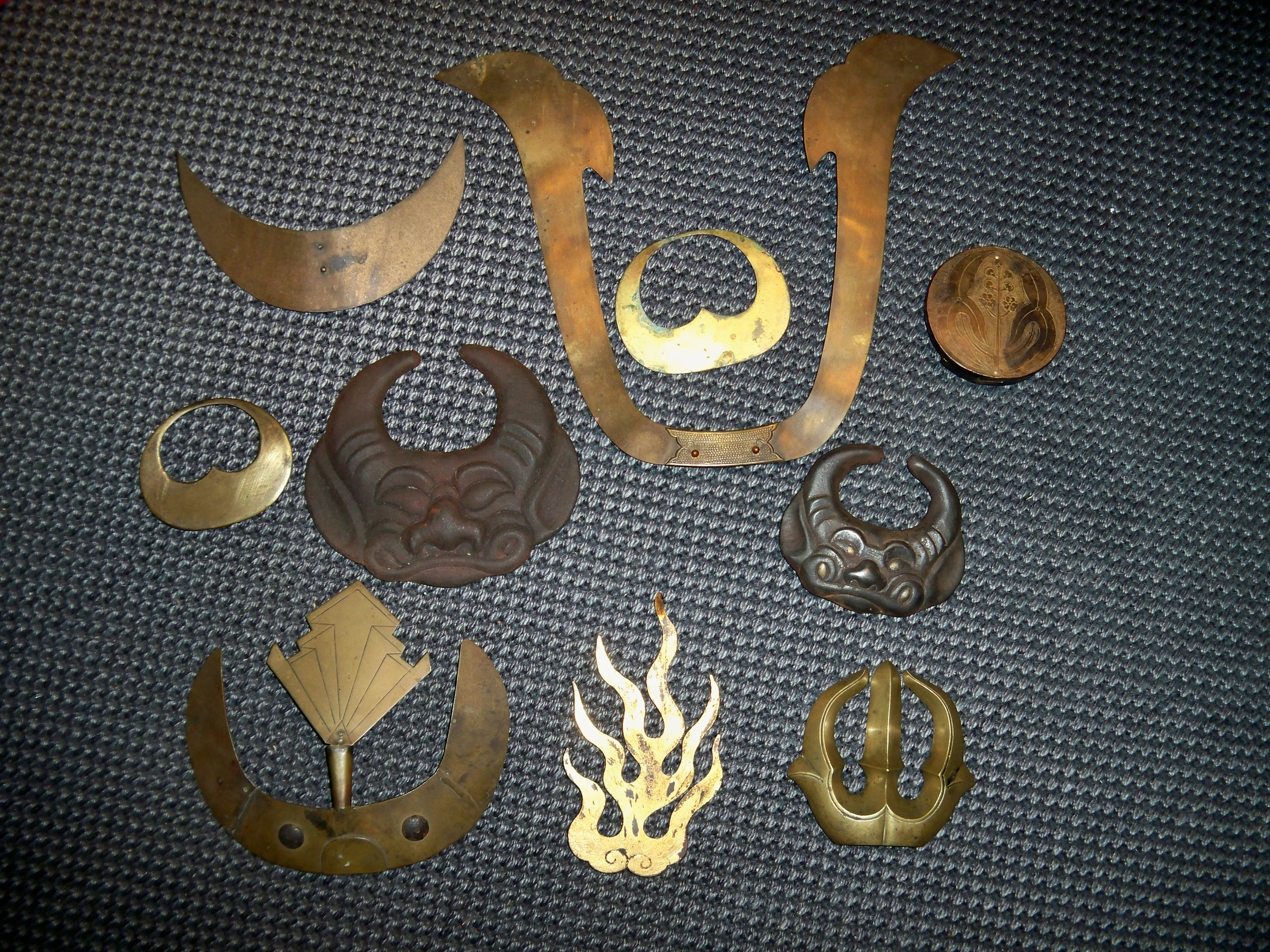
Various Japanese maedate, crests that are mounted in the front of a samurai helmet kabuto.

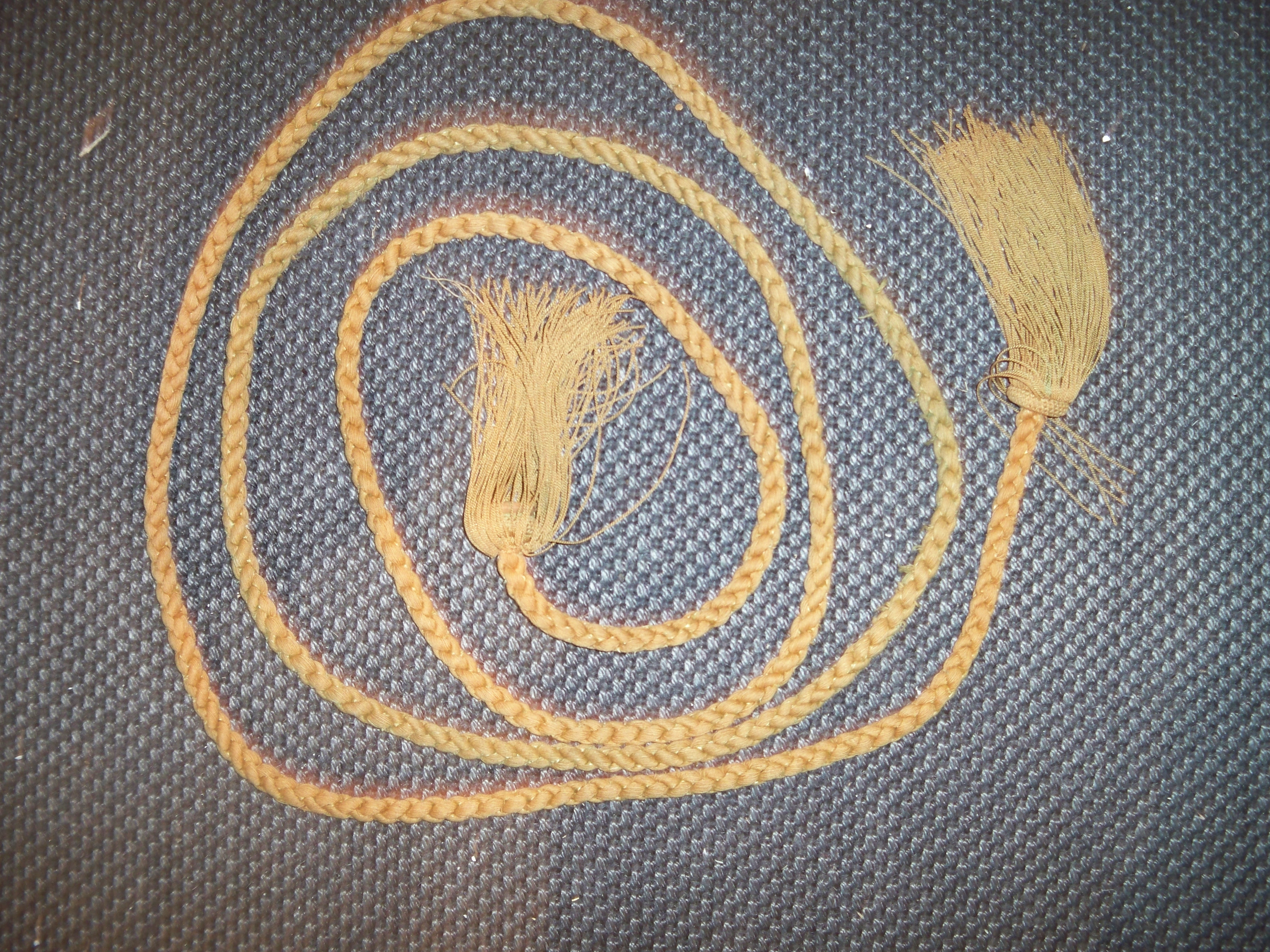
Japanese himo or obi, a cloth or rope belt used to hang swords and various items from a samurai armor.

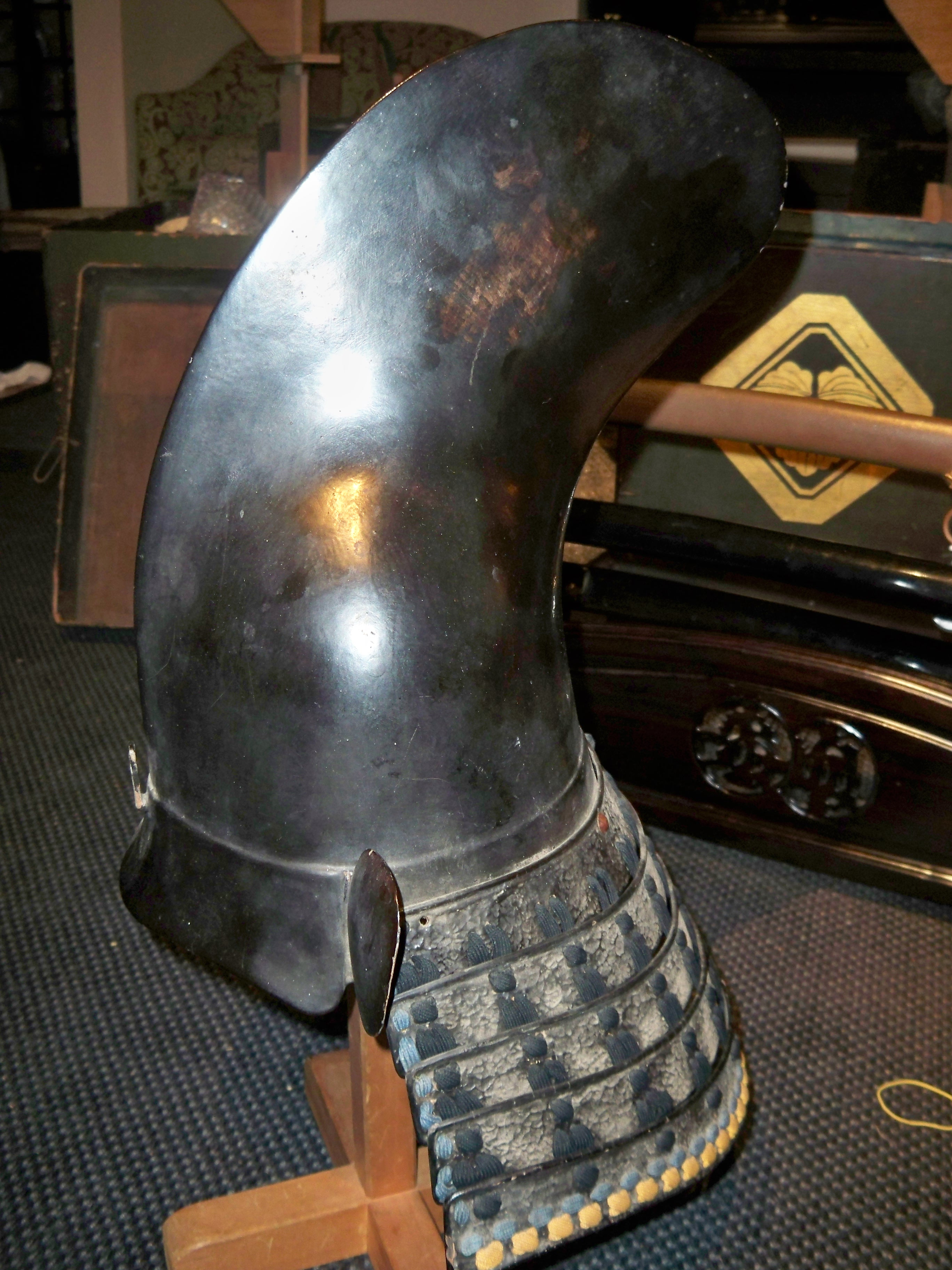
Samurai eboshi style helmet kabuto with an iron plate neck guard shikoro.

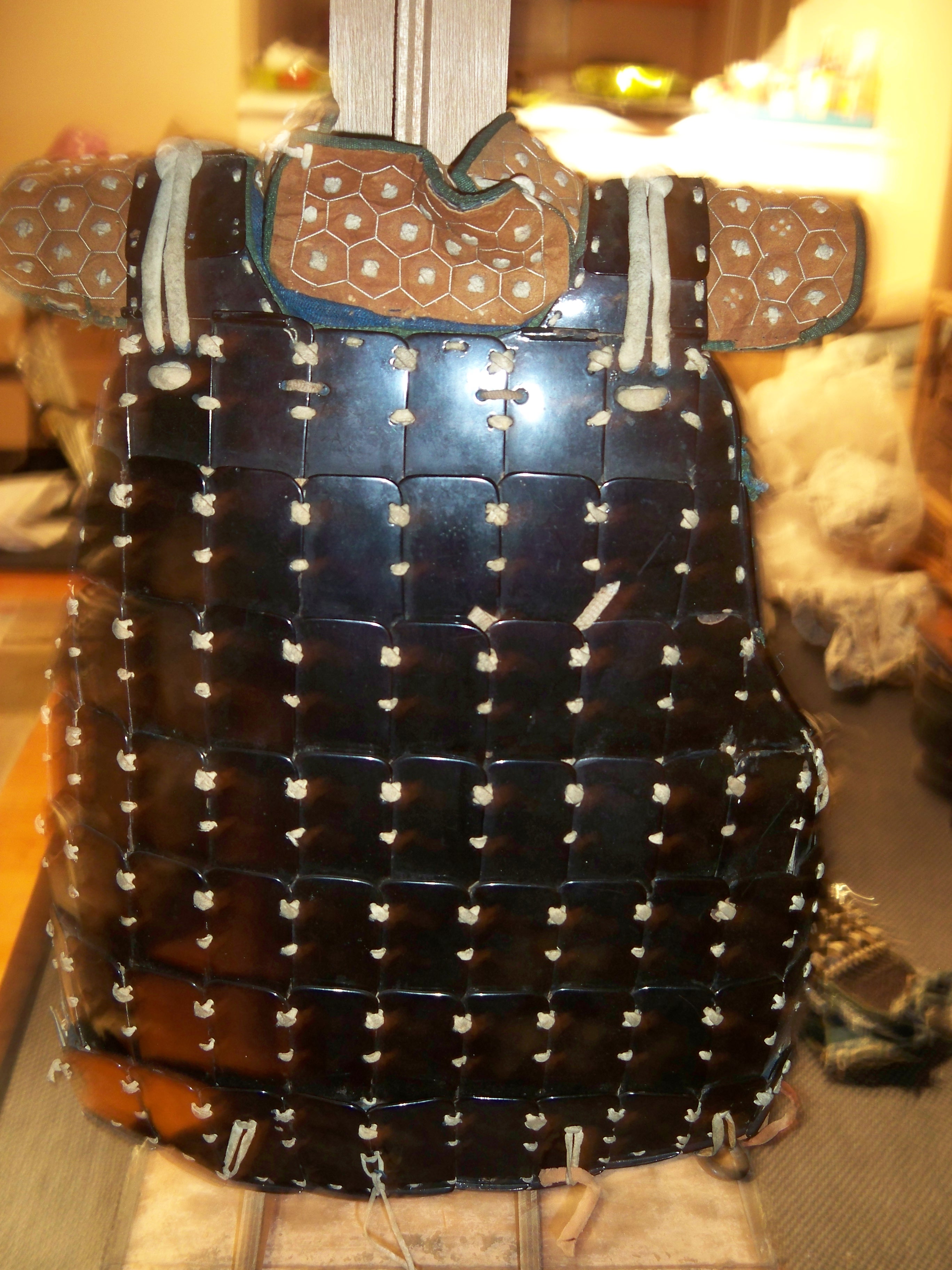
Edo period Japanese samurai karuta tatami dou. A folding portable chest armor.

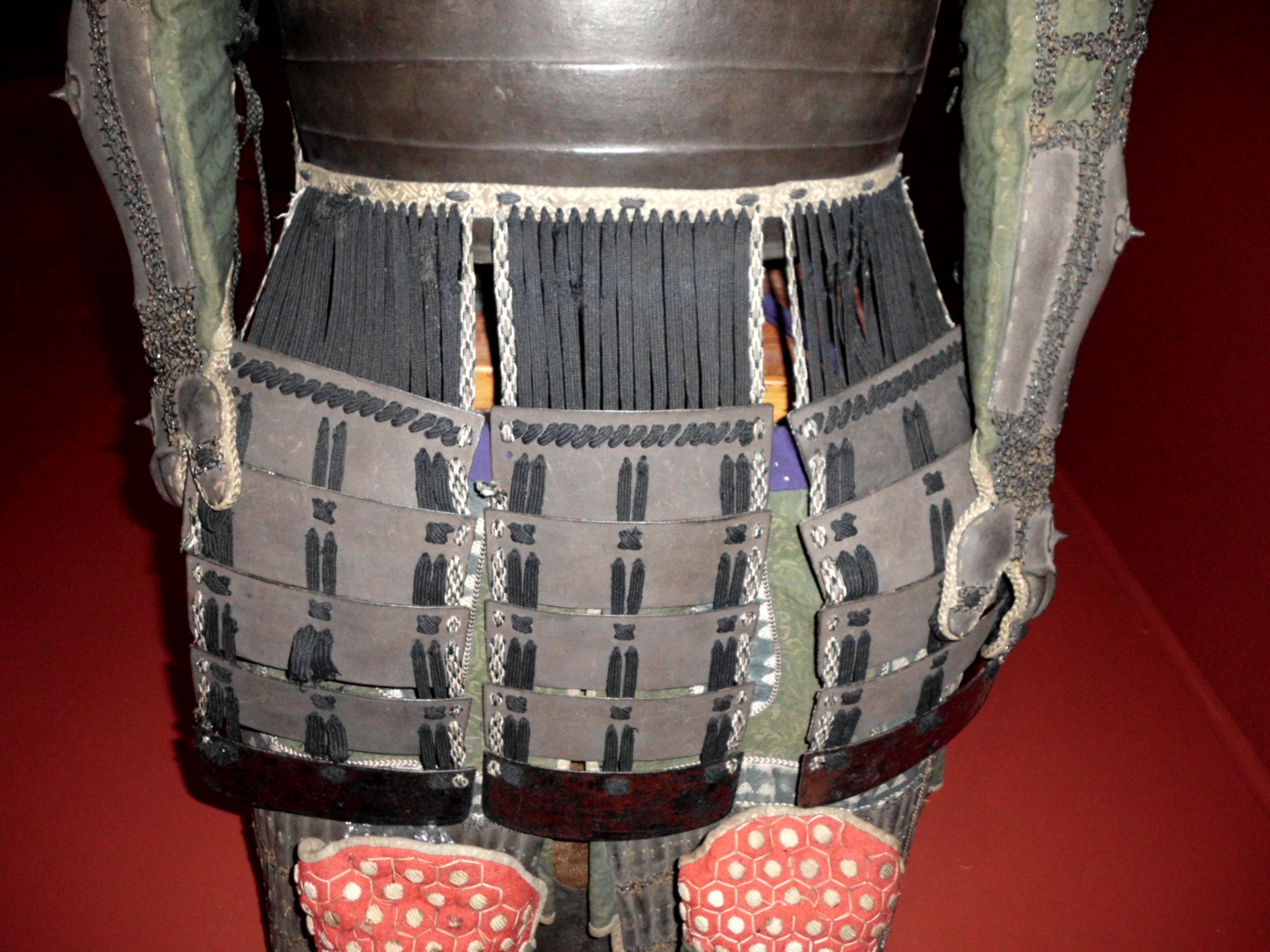
Antique Japanese samurai Edo period kusazuri, lacquered iron or leather panels which hang from the bottom of the chest armor dou.

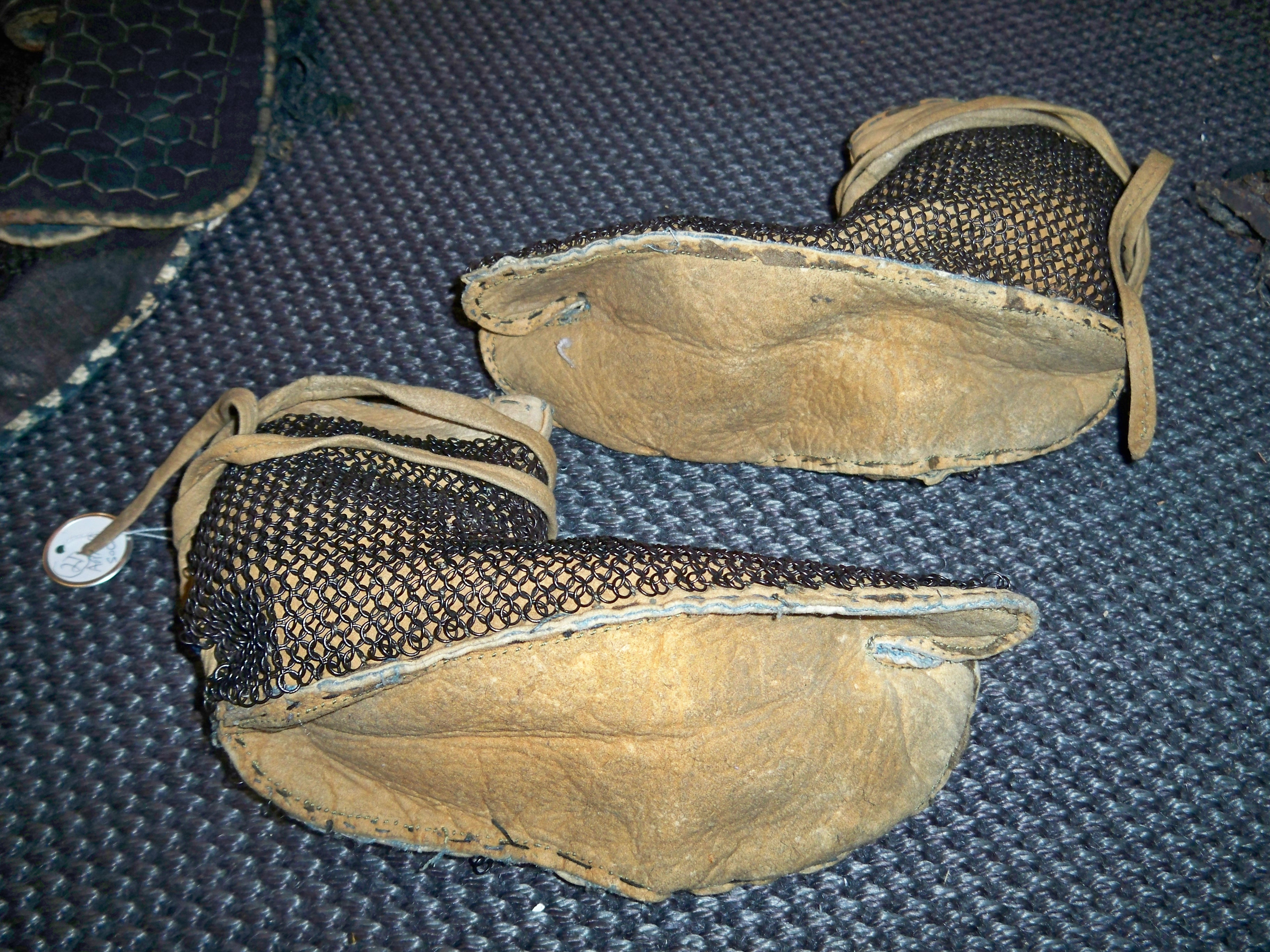
Japanese samurai Edo period kusari tabi, armored tabi (Kôgake), leather socks with chain armor kusari sewn to the leather.

== Rating of Japanese armors ==
At present, by the Law for the Protection of Cultural Properties, important armors of high historical value are designated as Important Cultural Properties (Jūyō Bunkazai, 重要文化財), and special armors among them are designated as National Treasures (Kokuhō, 国宝). The armors designated as cultural properties based on the law of 1930, which was already abolished, have the rank next to Important Cultural Properties as Important Art Object (Jūyō Bijutsuhin, 重要美術品).

The Association for the Research and Preservation of Japanese Helmets and Armor (ja:日本甲冑武具研究保存会, Nihon Katchu Bugu Kenkyu Hozon Kai), a general incorporated association, rates high-value armors in five grades. In order of rank, they are, from highest to lowest, Juyo Bunka Shiryo (重要文化資料, Important cultural article), Koshu Tokubetsu Kicho Shiryo (甲種特別貴重資料, Especially precious article first grade), Tokubetsu Kicho Shiryo (特別貴重資料, Especially precious article.), Kicho Shiryo (貴重資料, Precious article), Hozon Shiryo (保存資料, Article worth preserving).

== See also ==
- Dō (armour)
- Laminar armour
- Plated mail (tatami-do only)
- Shar-ayne – style of armor from the Middle East which has similar construction as the Sendai or yukinoshita dou (dō)
- Suneate
- Wakibiki
