= Hooper (surname) =

Hooper (or Hoopes) is a surname originating in England. It is derived from the archaic term hooper, meaning the man who fitted the wooden or metal hoops around the barrels or buckets that the cooper (barrel-maker) had made, essentially an assistant to the cooper.

Hoopes is a variant of the name, with the same origin.

== Hooper ==
=== People ===
- Austin Hooper (born 1994), American football player
- Ben W. Hooper (1870–1957), governor of Tennessee 1911–1915
- Carl Hooper (born 1966), West Indian cricket player
- Charmaine Hooper (born 1968), Canadian soccer player
- Chloe Hooper (born 1973), Australian author
- Chris Hooper (musician), Canadian musician with the Grapes of Wrath
- Chris Hooper (basketball) (born 1991), American basketball player
- Claire Hooper (born 1976), Australian stand-up comedian, television and radio presenter and writer
- Claire Hooper (artist) (born 1978), British artist
- Craig Hooper (born 1959), Australian musician
- Daniel Hooper aka Swampy (environmentalist) (born 1973), British environmental protester
- David Hooper (chemist) (1858–1947), British pharmaceutical chemist and quinologist in India
- David Vincent Hooper (1915–1998), British chess player and writer
- Dick Hooper (born 1956), Irish long-distance runner
- Dorothea Hooper (1932–2024), American politician from New Hampshire
- Dudley Hooper (1911–1968), British accountant and early promoter of electronic data processing
- Ed Hooper (journalist) (born 1964), American author, journalist and historian
- Edward W. Hooper (1839–1901), American Union Army officer and Harvard College treasurer
- Edwin B. Hooper (1909–1986), Vice-Admiral of the United States Navy and historian
- Ellen Sturgis Hooper (1812–1848), American transcendentalist poet
- Emma Hooper, Canadian author
- Frances Hooper (1892–1986), American journalist, collector of arts and books, advertising executive
- Gary Hooper (born 1988), English footballer
- Geoffrey H. Hooper, Australian World War I flying ace
- George Hooper (disambiguation), several people
- Geraldine Hooper (1841–1872), British preacher and hymn writer
- Gloria Hooper, Baroness Hooper (born 1939), British politician
- Gloria Hooper (athlete) (born 1992), Italian sprinter
- Harry Hooper (1887–1974), American baseball player
- Horace Everett Hooper (1859–1922), American publisher of Encyclopædia Britannica
- J. Robert Hooper (1936–2008), Maryland politician
- Jack Hooper (intelligence officer), deputy director of the Canadian Security Intelligence Service
- James Hooper (disambiguation), several people
- Joe R. Hooper (1938–1979), American Medal of Honor awardee
- JJ Hooper Jonathan James Hooper (born 1993), English footballer
- Jonathan S Hooper (born 1962), English painter
- Joseph L. Hooper (1877–1934), U.S. Representative from Michigan
- John Hooper (disambiguation), several people
- Johnson J. Hooper (c. 1815–1863), American humorist
- Karla Hooper, American politician
- Kate Hooper (born 1978), Australian water polo player
- Lance Hooper (born 1967), American NASCAR driver and team owner
- Lora Hooper, American biologist
- Lucy Hooper (1816–1841), American poet
- Lucy Hamilton Hooper (1835–1893), American poet, journalist, editor, playwright
- Lyndon Hooper (born 1966), Canadian soccer player
- Melanie Hooper, Australian dancer
- Mike Hooper (footballer) (born 1964), English footballer
- Minnie Hooper (1876–1964), Australian ballet teacher
- Nellee Hooper (born 1963), British producer/remixer for popular/rock music groups
- Nicholas Hooper, English composer
- Ofelia Hooper (1900–1981), Panamanian sociologist and poet
- Pat Hooper (1952–2020), Irish long-distance runner
- Paul Hooper (born 1952), English clergyman, former Archdeacon of Leeds
- Ralph Hooper (1926–2022), British aeronautical engineer
- Robin Hooper (1914–1989), British pilot and ambassador to Greece
- Selden G. Hooper (1904–1976), United States Navy admiral convicted by court-martial
- Stanford Caldwell Hooper (1884–1955), U.S. Navy admiral and radio pioneer
- Stuart Hooper (born 1981), English rugby union player
- Tobe Hooper (1943–2017), American television and film director in horror films
- Tom Hooper (ice hockey) (1883–1960), Canadian professional ice hockey player
- Tom Hooper (director) (born 1972), British film and television director
- Tom Hooper (musician), Canadian songwriter and musician
- Tom Hooper (rugby union), Australian rugby union player
- Tony Hooper (1939–2020), English musician and one-time member of Strawbs
- Walter Hooper (1931–2020), American writer
- William Hooper (1742–1790), signer of the United States Declaration of Independence
- William Harcourt Hooper (1834–1912), British wood-engraver

=== Fictional characters ===
- Candice Hooper, a character in the film Final Destination 5
- Edmund Hooper, a character in the novel called I'm the King of the Castle
- Hoppity Hooper, a cartoon character and namesake of the cartoon Hoppity Hooper
- J.P. Hooper, a character on the BBC TV show Death in Paradise
- Matt Hooper, a marine biologist from the novel Jaws, and the subsequent Jaws (film) portrayed by Richard Dreyfuss
- Molly Hooper, a character on the BBC TV show Sherlock
- Mr. Hooper, a character on the children's TV show Sesame Street

== Hoopes ==
- Darlington Hoopes (1896–1989), American politician and lawyer from Pennsylvania
- David C. Hoopes (born 1942), American public official
- Donelson Hoopes (1932–2006), American art historian and curator
- Josiah Hoopes (1832–1904), American botanist
- Laura Mays Hoopes (1942–2021), American biologist
- Lorenzo Hoopes (1913–2012), American executive
- Matt Hoopes, American artist
- Mitch Hoopes (1953–2020), American football player
- Patrick Hoopes (born 2002), Artistic gymnast
- Roy Hoopes (1922–2009), American journalist and writer
- Samantha Hoopes (born 1991), American model
- Samuel H. Hoopes (1811–1892), American politician from Pennsylvania
- Townsend Hoopes (1922–2004), American historian and public official
- Wendy Hoopes (born 1972), American actress
