= Lucy Hooper =

American poet

- Born: February 4, 1816; Newburyport, Massachusetts, U.S.
- Died: August 1, 1841 (aged 25); Brooklyn, New York, U.S.
- Occupation: poet
- Writing career
- Period: Romantic era
- Notable works: The Lady's book of flowers and poetry to which are added a botanical introduction, a complete floral dictionary, and a chapter on plants in rooms.

Lucy Hooper (February 4, 1816 – August 1, 1841) was a 19th-century American writer known for her poetry and newspaper accounts during the Romantic era. Her interests included botany and poetry. She is remembered for writing The Lady's Book, "one of the most accomplished of the American flower books". Hooper died of consumption at the age of 25.

== Early life and education ==
Lucy Hooper was born in Newburyport, Massachusetts, February 4, 1816. Her father was Joseph Hooper, a merchant of that city. At the age of fourteen, the family removed to Brooklyn, New York.

Lucy's father assured that she received the best education possible.

== Career ==
Soon after the move to Brooklyn, Hooper became an occasional contributor to the Long Island Star. Though anonymous, her pieces were widely copied. Besides her compositions in verse, upon which Hooper's notability chiefly rests, she was the author of many prose articles. These were collected in a volume, and published in 1840, under the title of Scenes from Real Life. Among them was the prize essay on "Domestic Happiness". But, like Henry Kirke White, the Davidson sisters, Lucretia and Margaret, Hooper's career ended when she was young.

== Death and legacy ==
Since childhood, her health had been delicate, and she was affected deeply by the death of her father, and other domestic problems. Hooper died of consumption at Brooklyn, on August 1, 1841.

Her Poetical Remains was published posthumously in 1842, with a memoir by John Keese. Complete Poetical Works was published in 1848, in compliance with the wishes of many of Hooper's friends. Some of the pieces in the second part of this volume had not been previously published, and a few, only in one or two local newspapers. The greater number of them were written at a very early age. Hooper had put aside many of these poems for improvement and correction, that they might not be published until they could appear in a more finished form. At the same time, she destroyed others, lest they might, through the partiality of some friends, come out (as she used to say) "to her utter confusion". These early productions were considered interesting for their natural language. There were also unfinished pieces and fragments, which were thought might add interest to the book. One or two poetical effusions were copied from Riker's Book of Poetry and Flowers, which was edited by Hooper a few months before her death. Hooper's prose writings have never been collected and published in a volume, excepting a few tales, entitled Scenes from Real Life. When arranged for publication they were to make two volumes, one of "Tales and Essays", another "Religious and Moral Stories", for juvenile readers.

== Selected works ==
- Composition book, 1839-1841
- Look at the sky today
- Scenes from real life : and other American tales, 1841
- Floral souvenir. A perennial gift., 1842
- The Lady's book of flowers and poetry to which are added a botanical introduction, a complete floral dictionary, and a chapter on plants in rooms., 1842
- The ladies' hand-book of the language of flowers, 1844
- Poetical remains of the late L. H., collected and arranged; with a memoir by J. Keese., 1848
