= Kusari (Japanese mail armour) =

Japanese term for mail armour

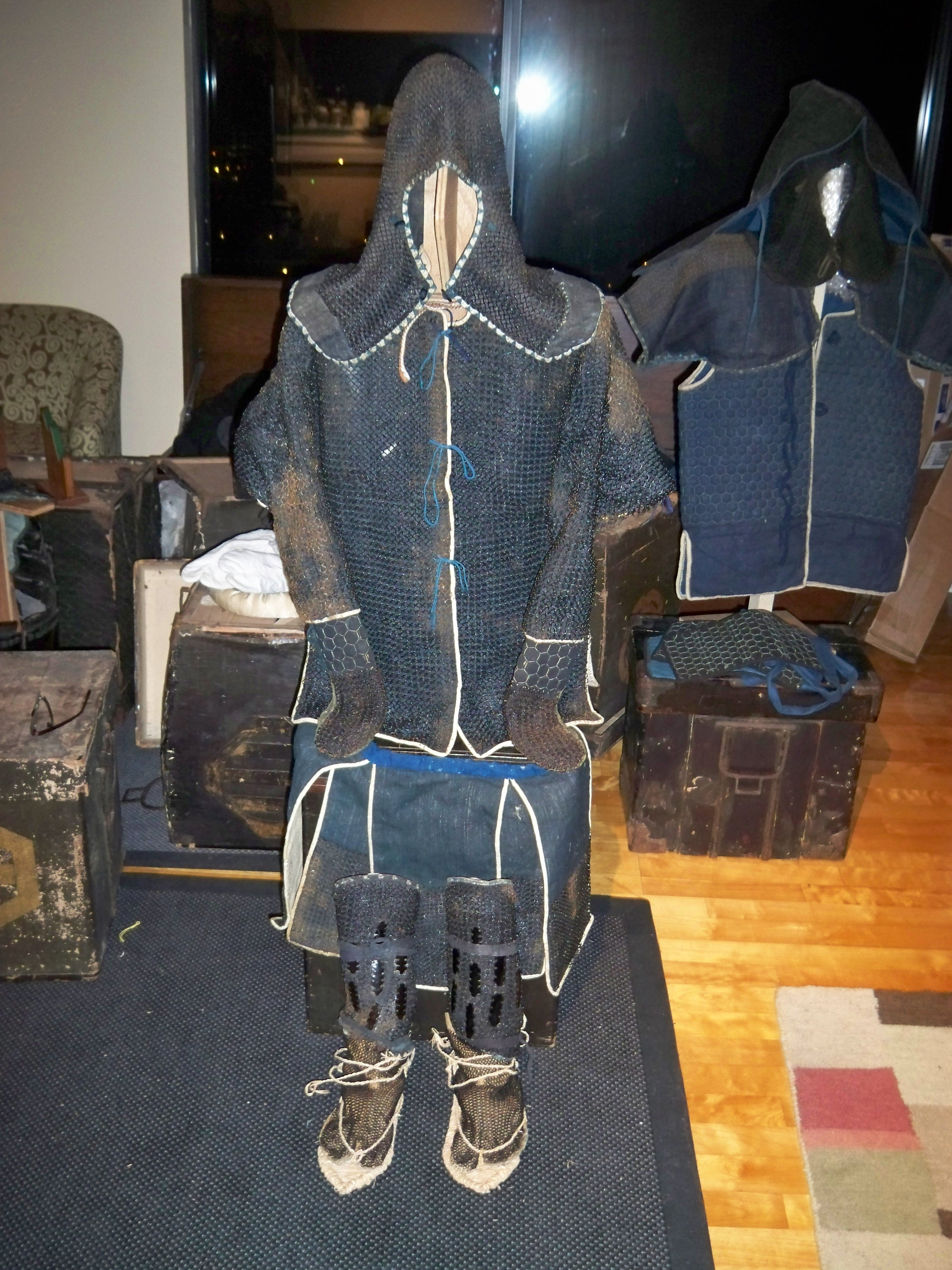
Edo period Japanese (samurai) chain armour or kusari gusoku

Kusari katabira (Japanese: 鎖帷子; lit. 'chain + single-layer robe') is the Japanese term for mail armour. Kusari is a type of armour used by the samurai class and their retainers in feudal Japan. When the word kusari is used in conjunction with an armoured item, it usually means that the kusari makes up the majority of the armour defence.

== History and description ==
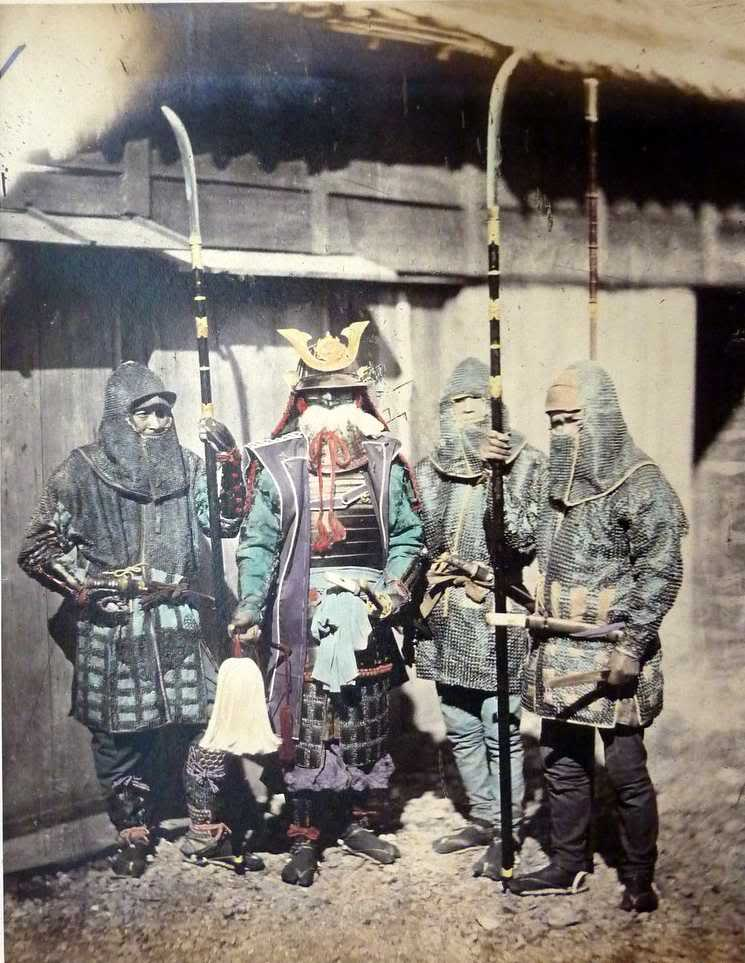
Rare 1800s photograph showing kusari katabira (chain armour jackets) and hachi-gane (forehead protectors) with kusari shikoro (chain armour neck guards) being worn

The Japanese had more varieties of mail than all the rest of the world put together. Kusari was used in samurai armour at least from the time of the Mongol invasions of Japan (1270s) but particularly from the Nanboku-chō period (1336–1392).

Kusari was typically made with rings that were much smaller than their European counterparts, and patches of kusari were used to link together plates and to drape over vulnerable areas such as the underarm. Most common parts of samurai armour could be made with kusari as the main armour defence as well as many types of garments including jackets, hoods, gloves, vests, greaves, pauldrons, thigh guards, even kusari tabi socks.

Kusari was commonly used during the Edo period (1603–1868) for a soldier's entire armour. According to George Cameron Stone, "Entire suits of mail were worn on occasions, sometimes under the ordinary clothing". During most of the Edo period, traditional armour was for the most part relegated to ceremonial use and as a display of wealth, power, class, and rank, while lightweight portable armour and armoured clothing such as tatami armour and kusari karabira were still in use. While large battles were a thing of the past, revolts, peasant uprisings, clan conflicts, individual duels, assassination attempts, and the like ensured that samurai still needed some kind of armour protection. Edo-period samurai police officers (machikata doshin) wore kusari garments for protection when making an arrest, and Ian Bottomley in Arms and Armor of the Samurai: The History of Weaponry in Ancient Japan shows a picture of kusari armour and mentions kusari katabira "chain jazerants" with detachable arms being worn by samurai police officials during the Edo period.

The end of the samurai era in the 1860s, along with the 1876 Haitō Edict banning carrying weapons in public, marked the end of any practical use for mail and other armour in Japan. Japan turned to a conscription army and uniforms replaced armour.

== Types of kusari ==
The Japanese used many different weave methods to produce kusari mail, including: a square 4-in-1 pattern (so-gusari), a hexagonal 6-in-1 pattern (hana-gusari), and a European 4-in-1 (nanban-gusari), the kusari links could be doubled up, and some examples were tripled in a possible attempt to make the kusari bullet resistant. The links were lacquered black to prevent rusting, and were always stitched onto a backing of cloth or leather. The kusari was sometimes concealed entirely between layers of cloth.

=== Riveted links ===
Riveted kusari was known and used in Japan. In the book Japanese Arms & Armor Introduction by H. Russell Robinson, there is a picture of Japanese riveted kusari on page 58. This quote from the translated reference of Sakakibara Kozan's 1800 book, The Manufacture of Armour and Helmets in Sixteenth Century Japan, shows that the Japanese not only knew of and used riveted kusari, but that they manufactured it as well.

"... karakuri-namban (riveted namban), with stout links each closed by a rivet. Its invention is credited to Fukushima Dembei Kunitaka, pupil, of Hojo Awa no Kami Ujifusa, but it is also said to be derived directly from foreign models. It is heavy because the links are tinned (biakuro-nagashi) and these are also sharp edged because they are punched out of iron plate".

==== Riveted links ====
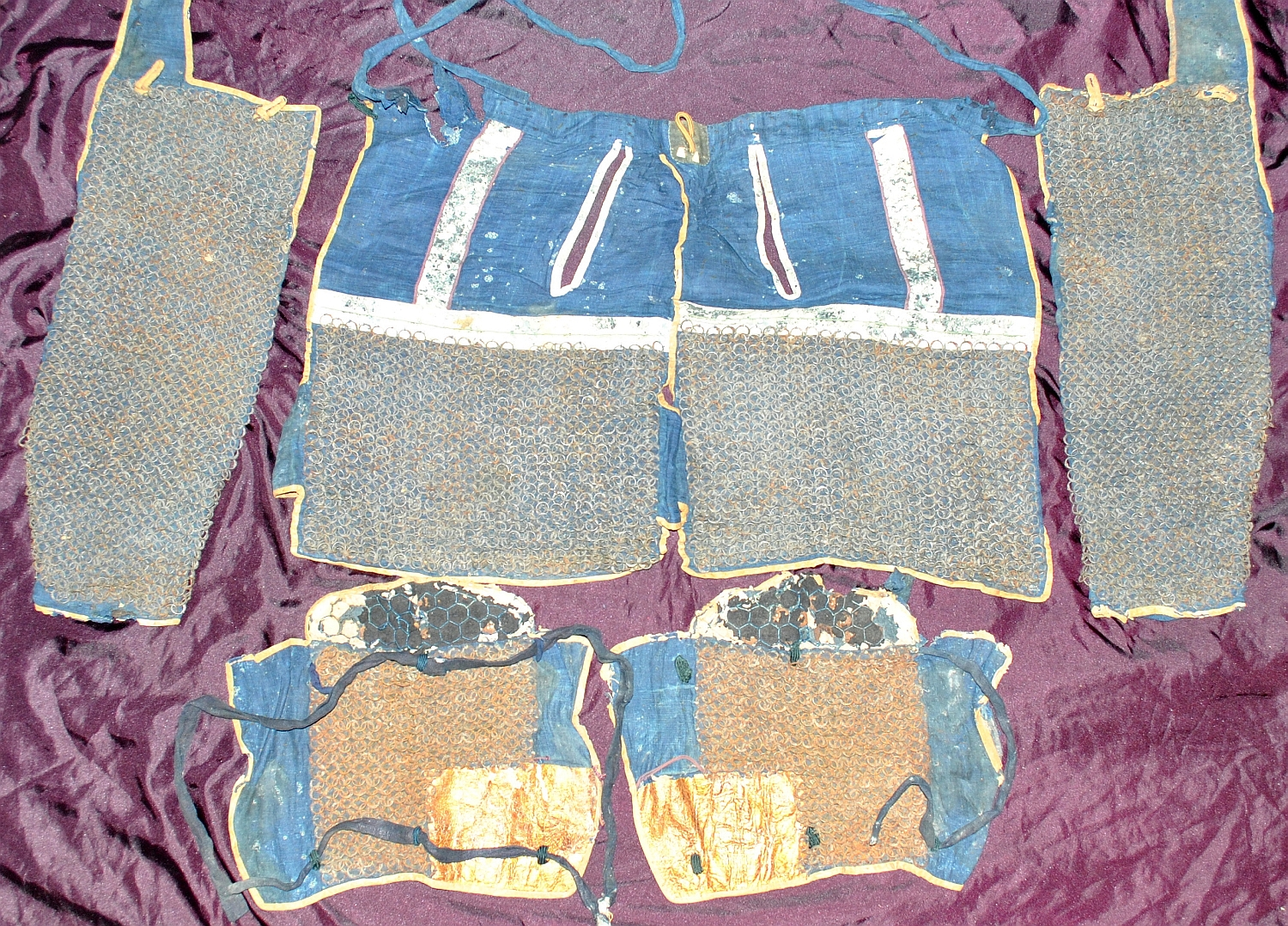
Riveted kusari sangu

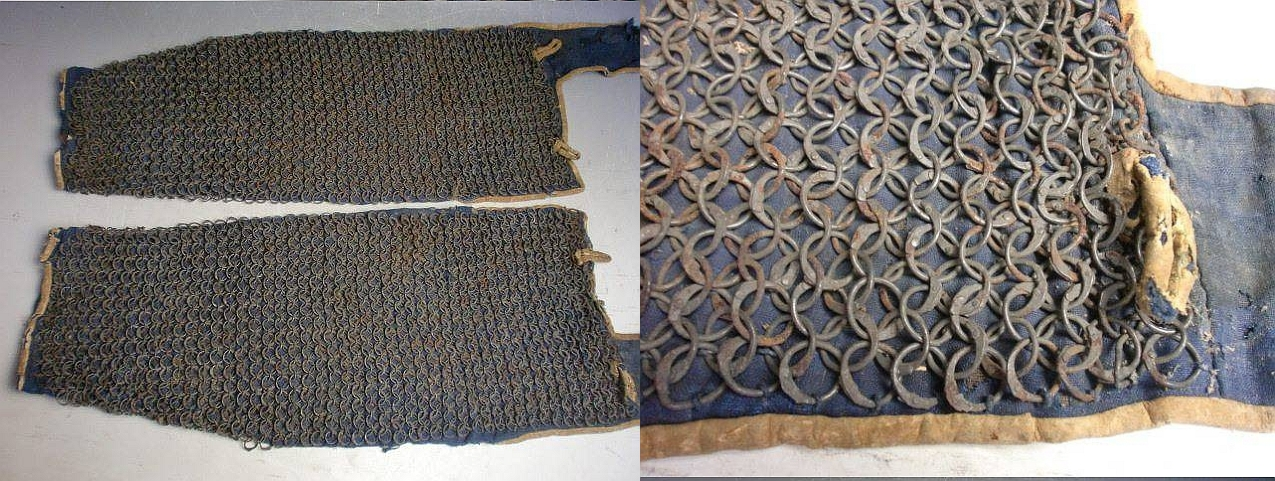
Riveted kusari kote

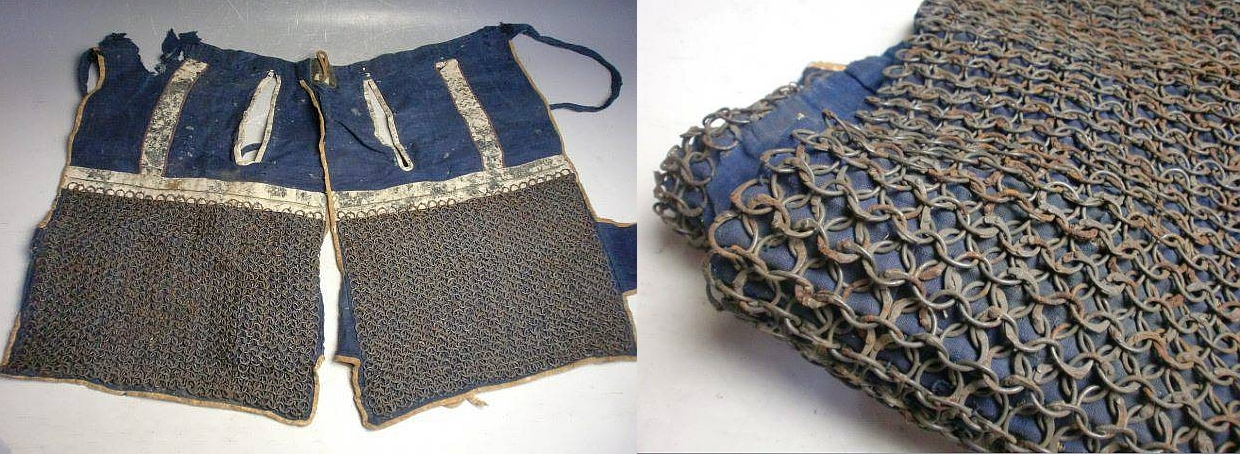
Riveted kusari haidate

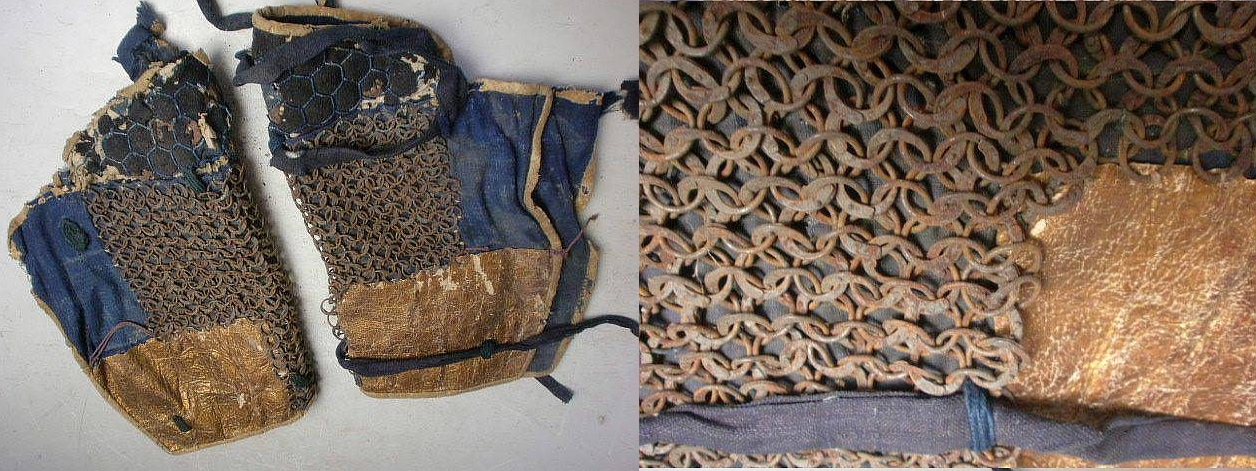
Riveted kusari suneate

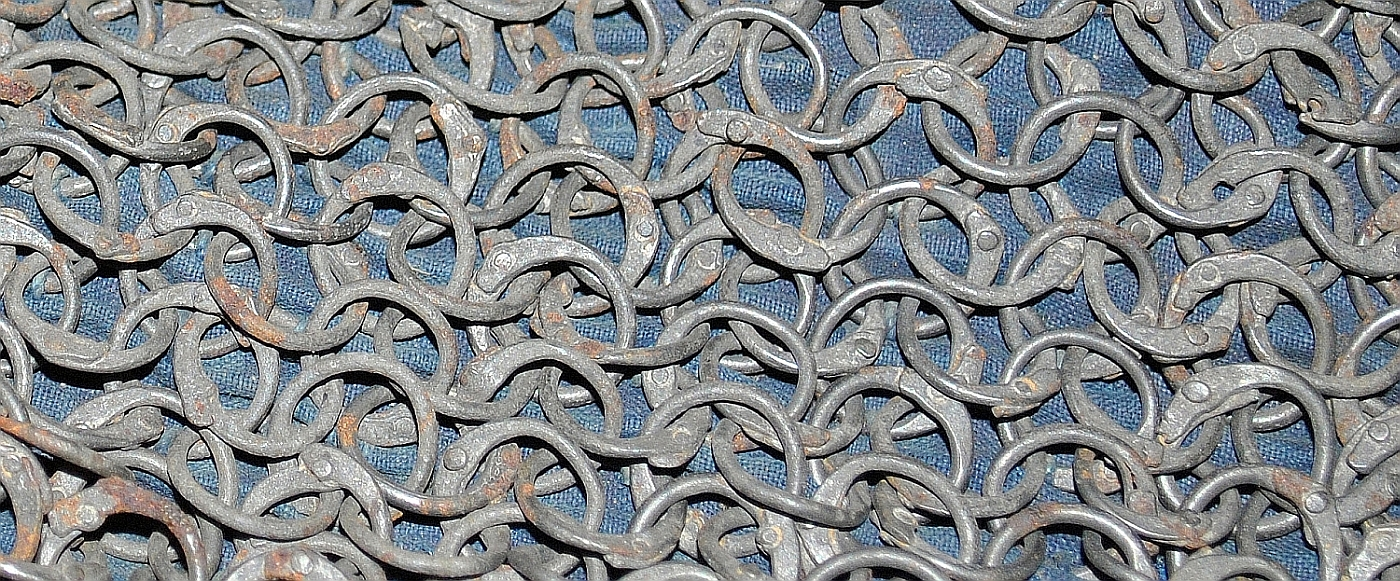
Riveted kusari (close up view)

=== Butted or split/twisted links ===
Butted and or split (twisted) links made up the majority of kusari links used by the Japanese. Links were either butted together meaning that the ends touched each other and were not riveted, or the kusari was constructed with links where the wire was turned or twisted two or more times. These twisted links are similar to the modern split ring commonly used on key chains. Twisted links always connected to a center butted link. Both butted and twisted links could be used on the same armour item, with butted links covering certain areas and twisted links on another.

==== Butted links ====
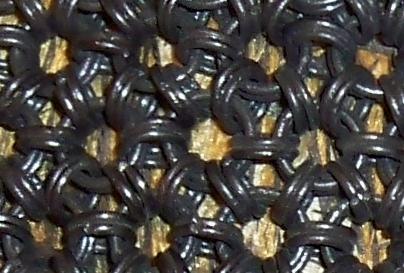
Double butted 6 in 1 kusari

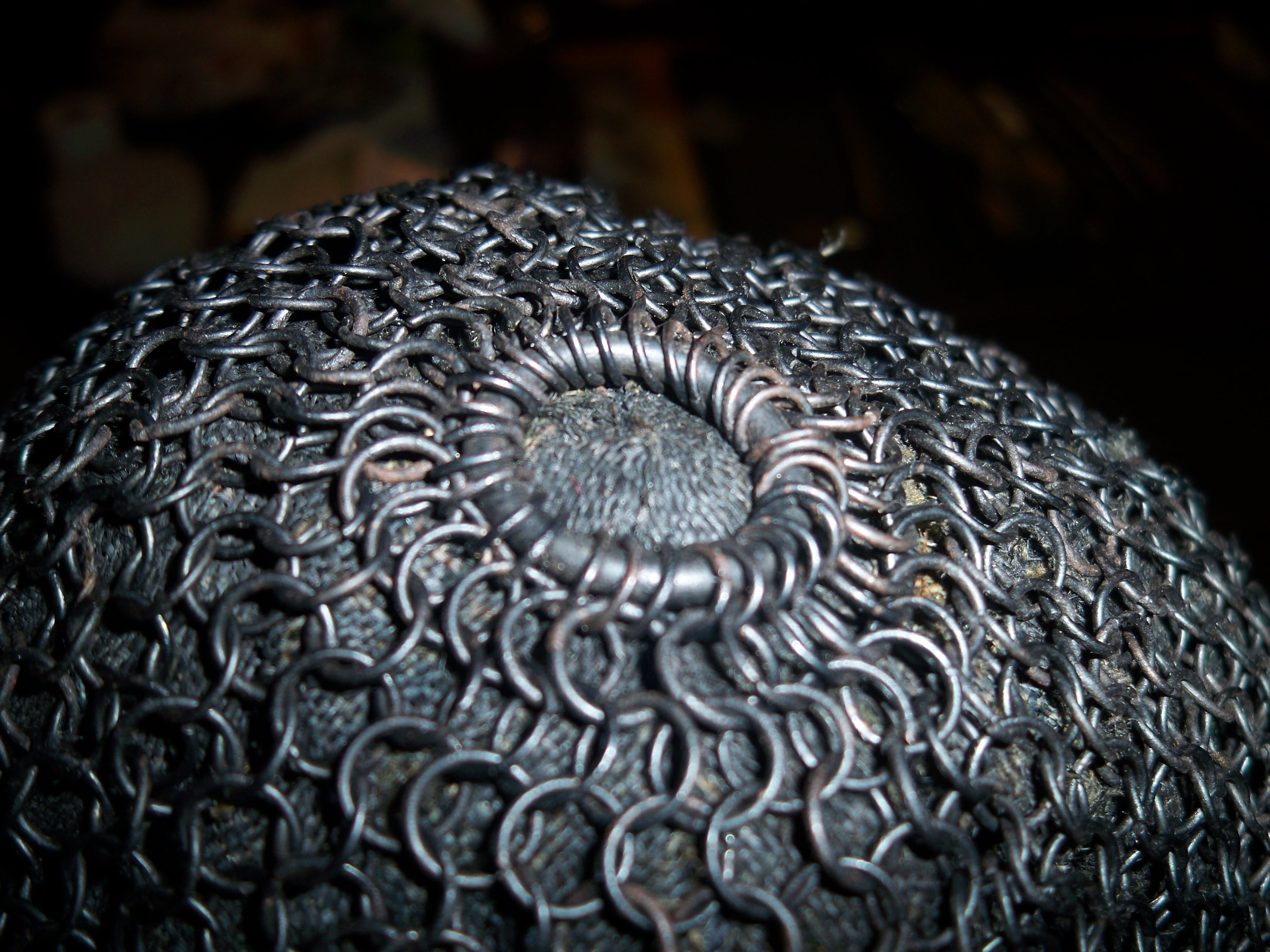
Close up view of a kusari zukin (hood) with butted links

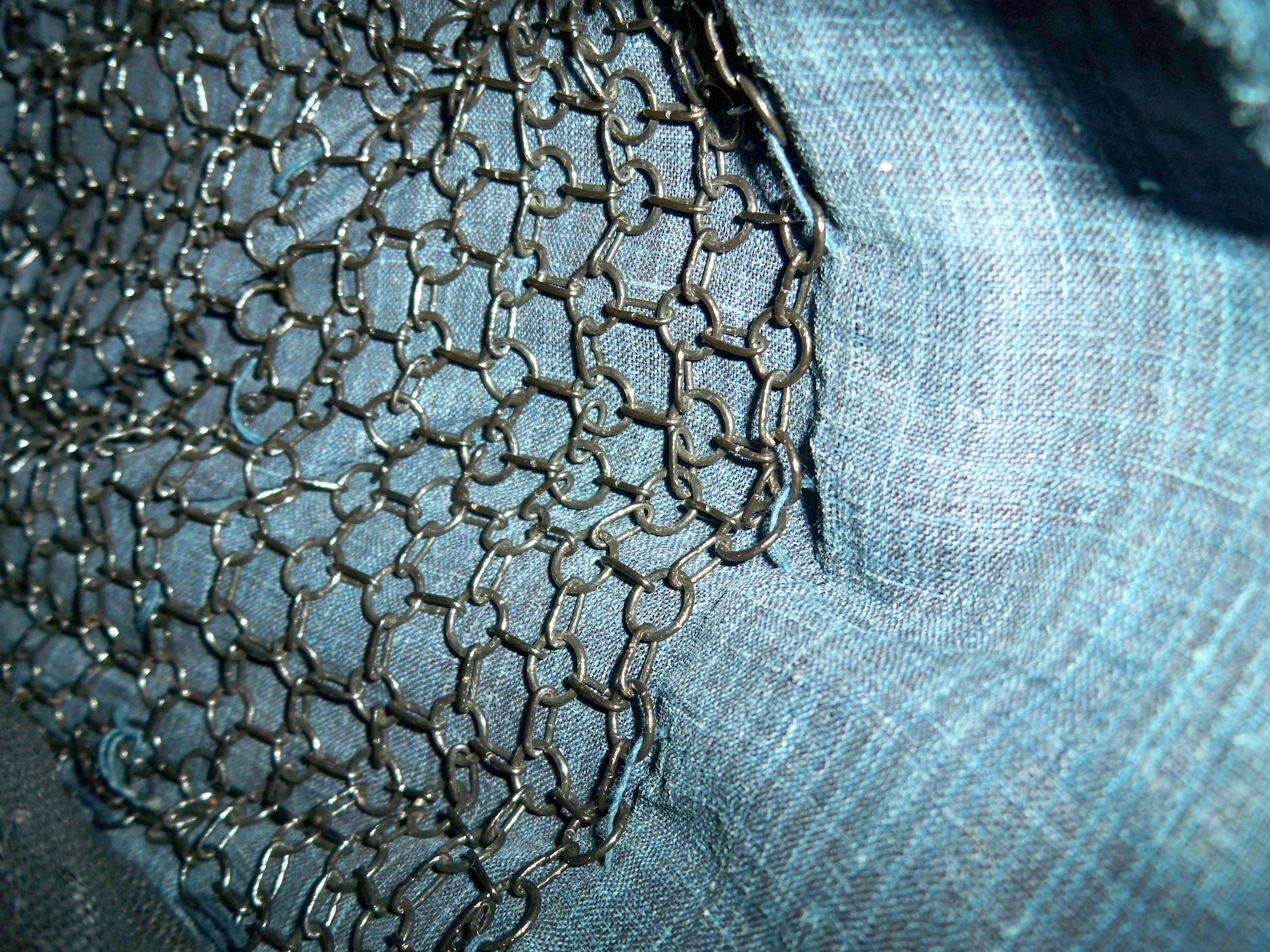
Butted oval and round kusari links sewn to a cloth backing

==== Twisted links ====
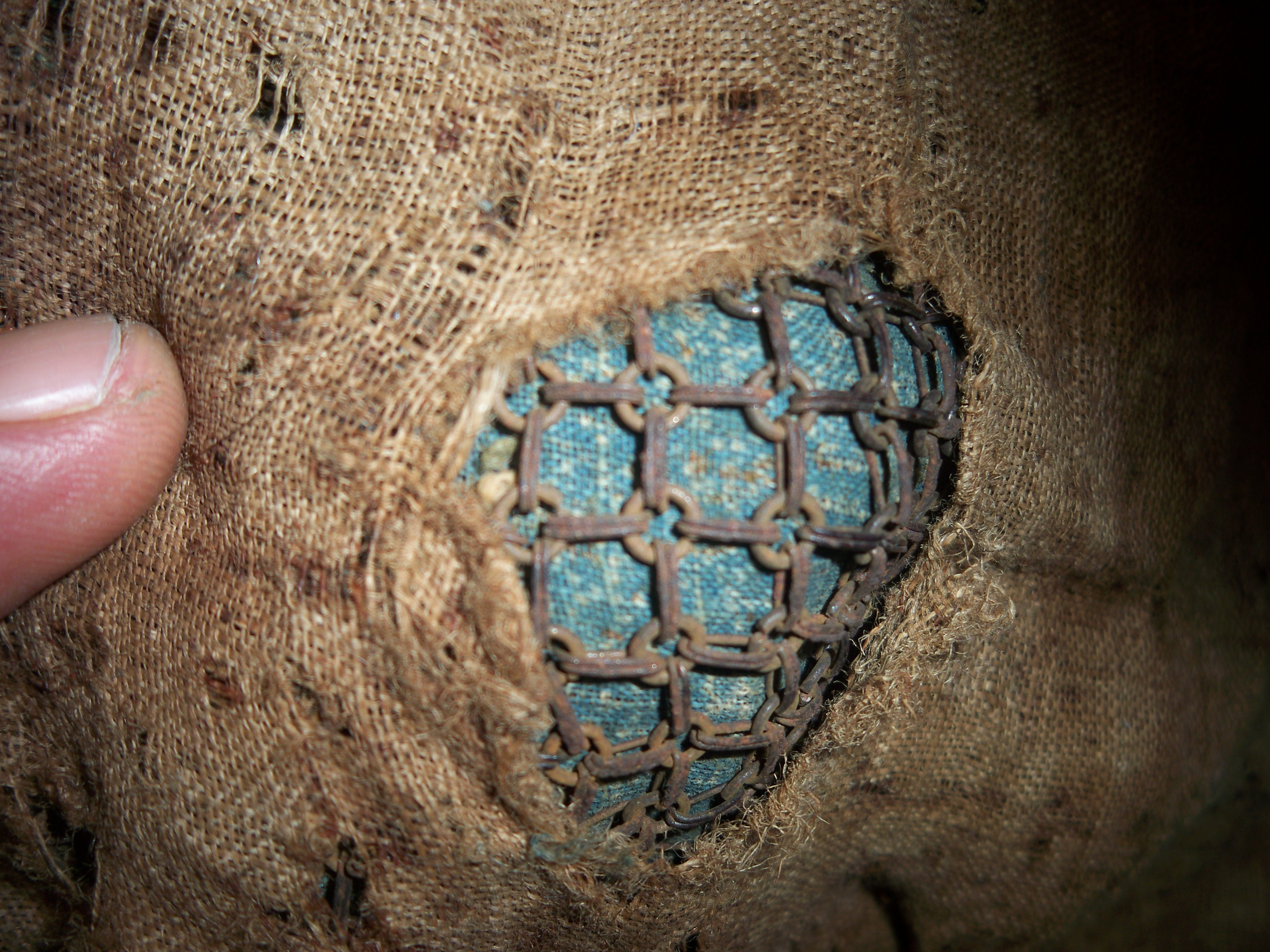
Split/twisted kusari links sewn between layers of cloth

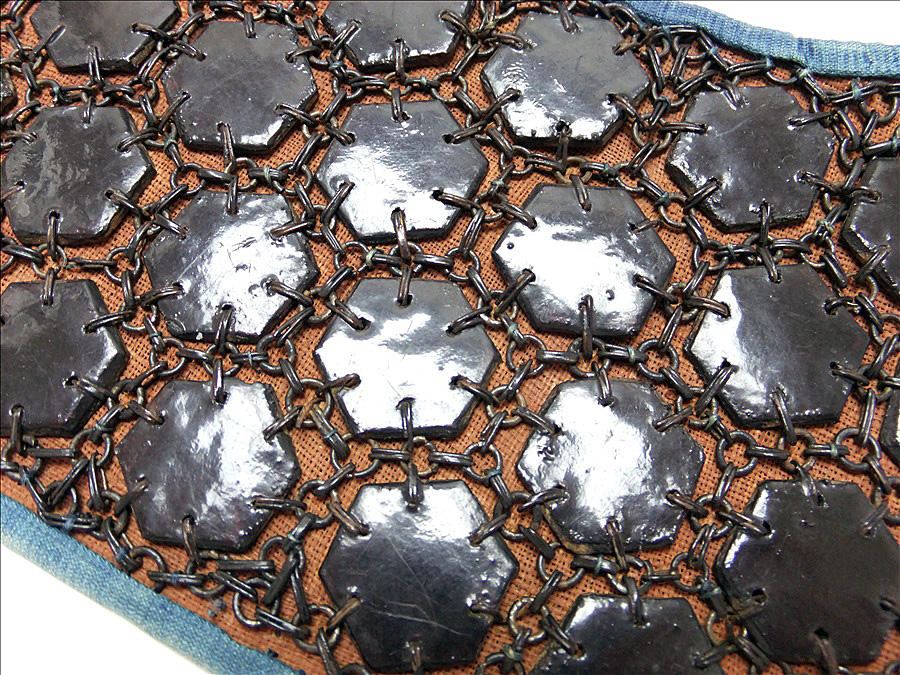
Kikko plates connected by split/twisted kusari links

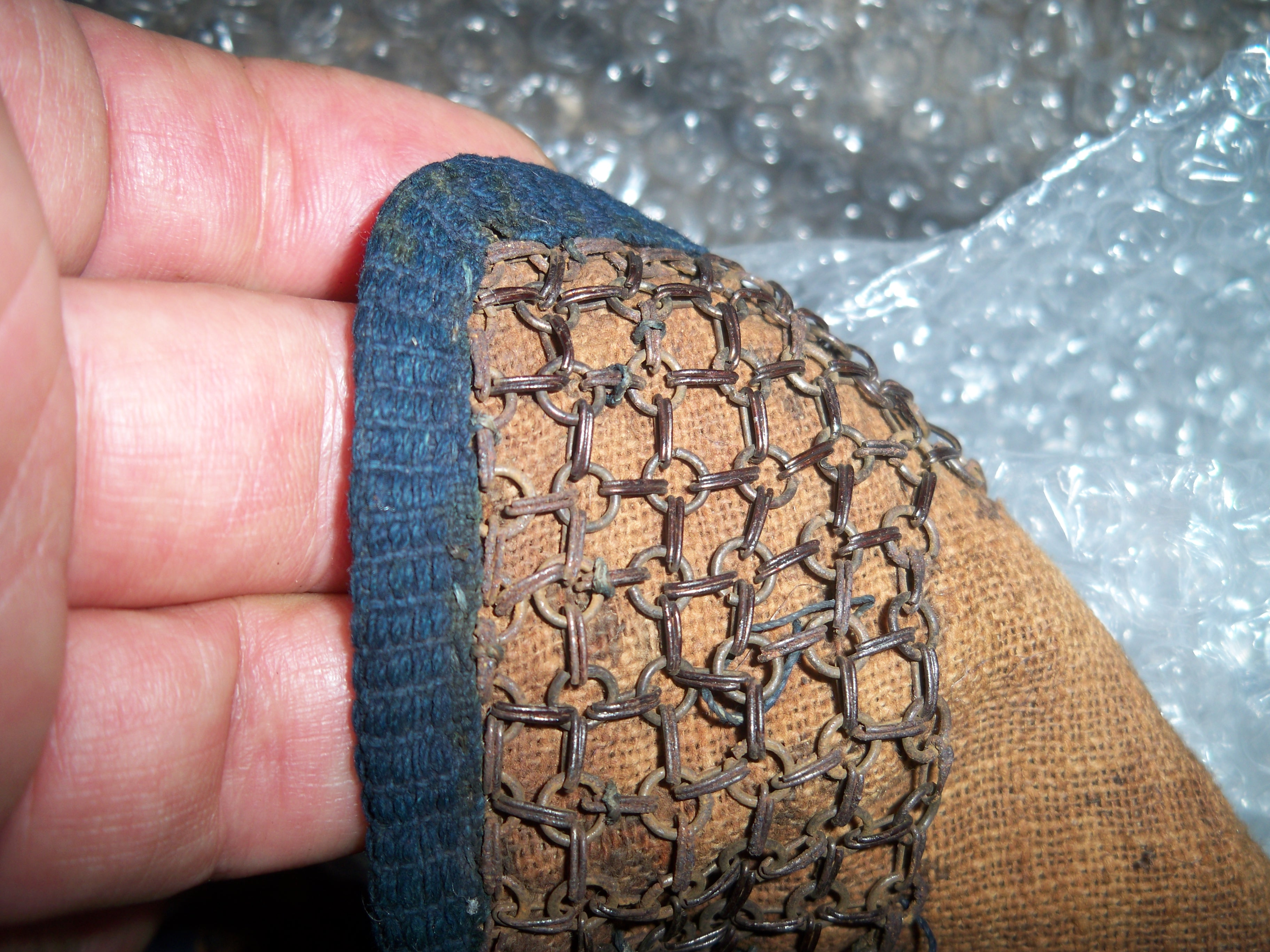
Split/twisted links

== Kusari examples ==
Kusari was commonly used to connect the armour plates on the sangu (three extremity armours), the haidate (thigh armour), suneate (greaves covering the shins), and kote (armored sleeves), the armour for these items could also be composed almost entirely of kusari. Kusari was also used to connect the armour plates on many types of tatami armour. Kusari could also be used as the main armour for the dō (chest armour), for the kusazuri (tassets) of the dō, and on the sode (shoulder armour). Many types of Japanese auxiliary armours used kusari in their construction or as the mail armour defense. Kusari katabira or chain jazerants were common as well as kusari zukin (chain hoods). Shikoro (neck guards) on kabuto (helmets) and hachigane (forehead protectors) could have kusari as defence.

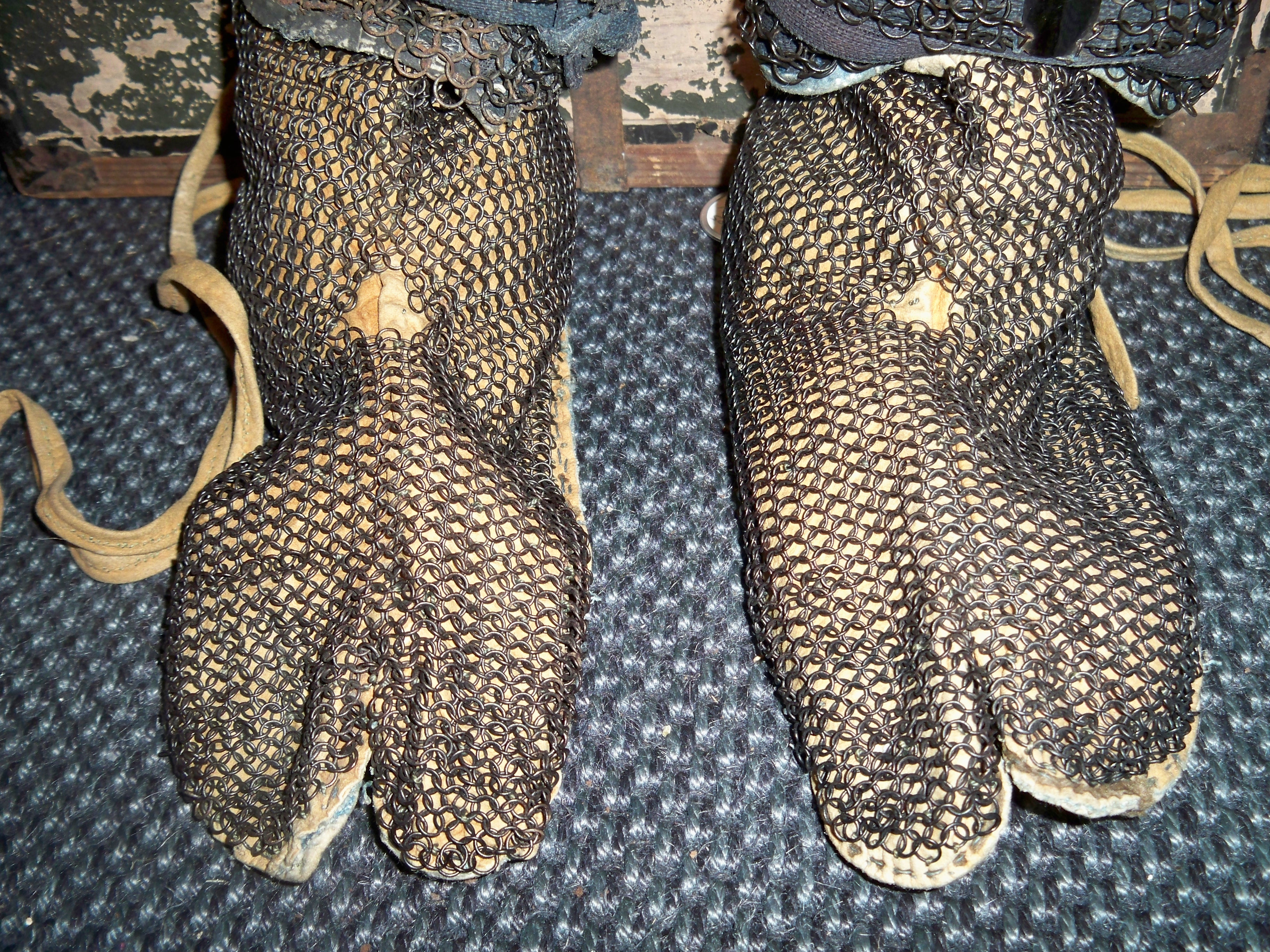
Kusari tabi (chain armour socks)

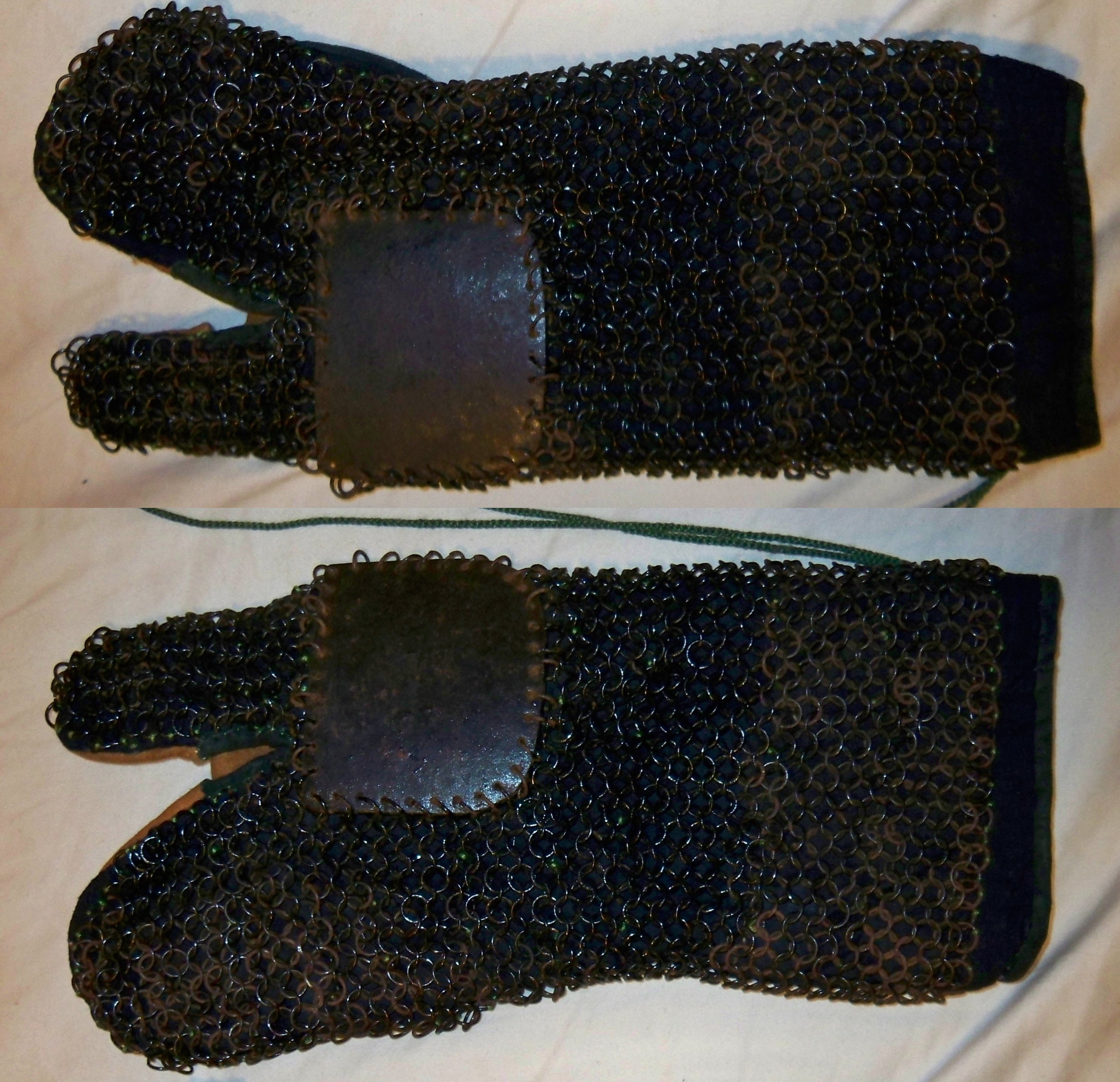
Kusari han kote (chain armour half sleeves/gauntlets)

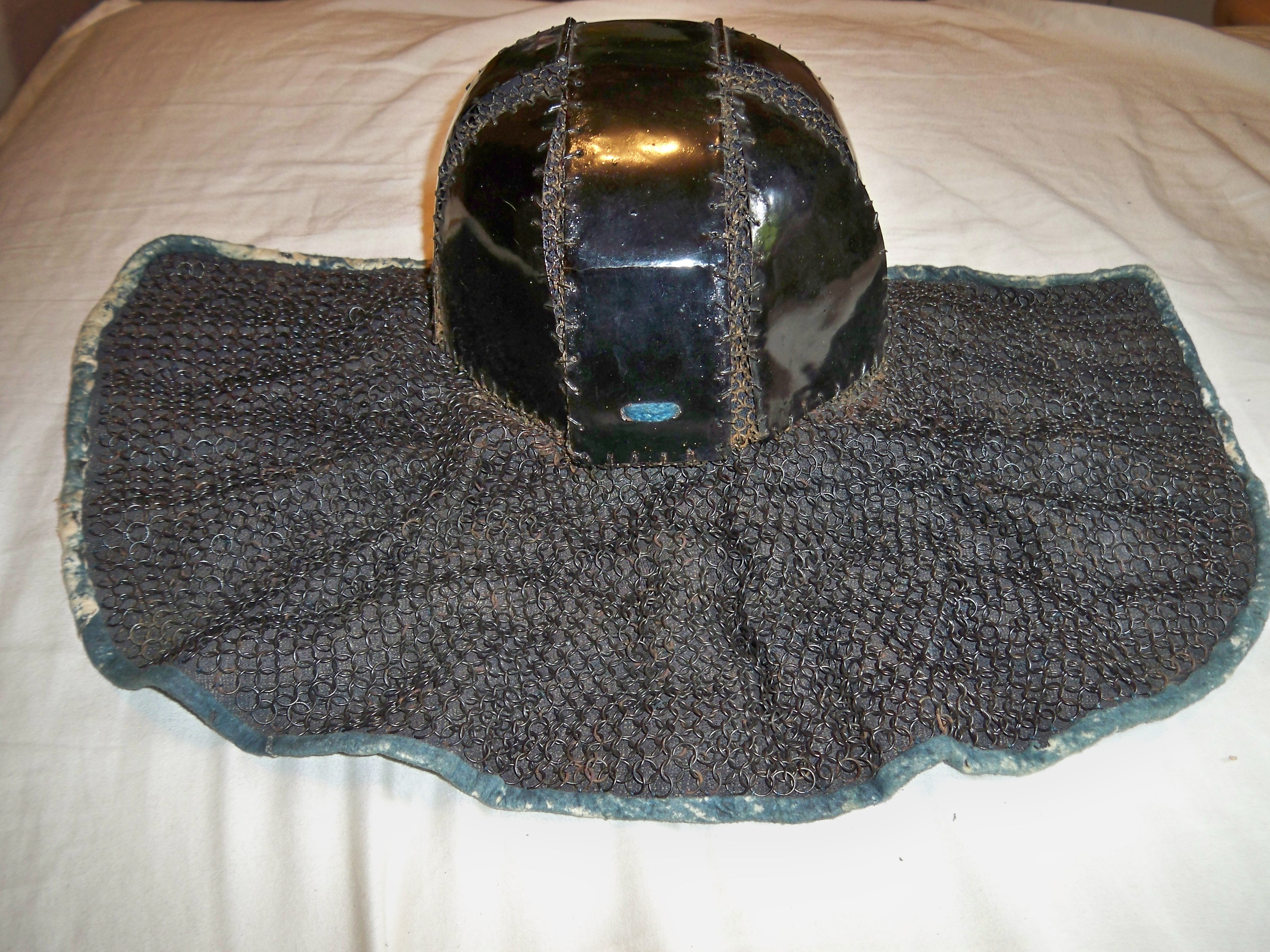
Karuta kabuto with kusari shikoro (chain armour neck guard)

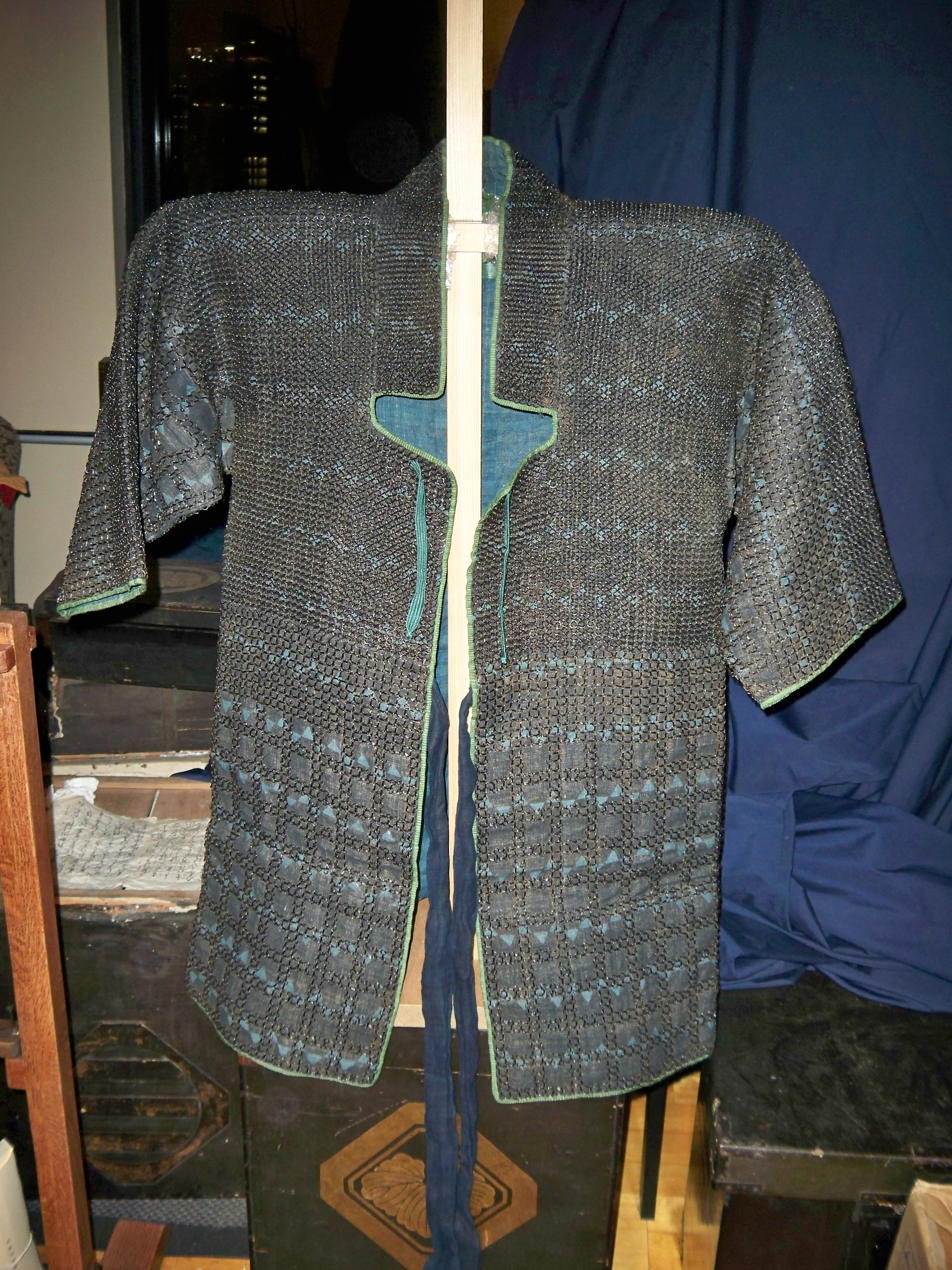
Kusari katabira (chain armour jacket)

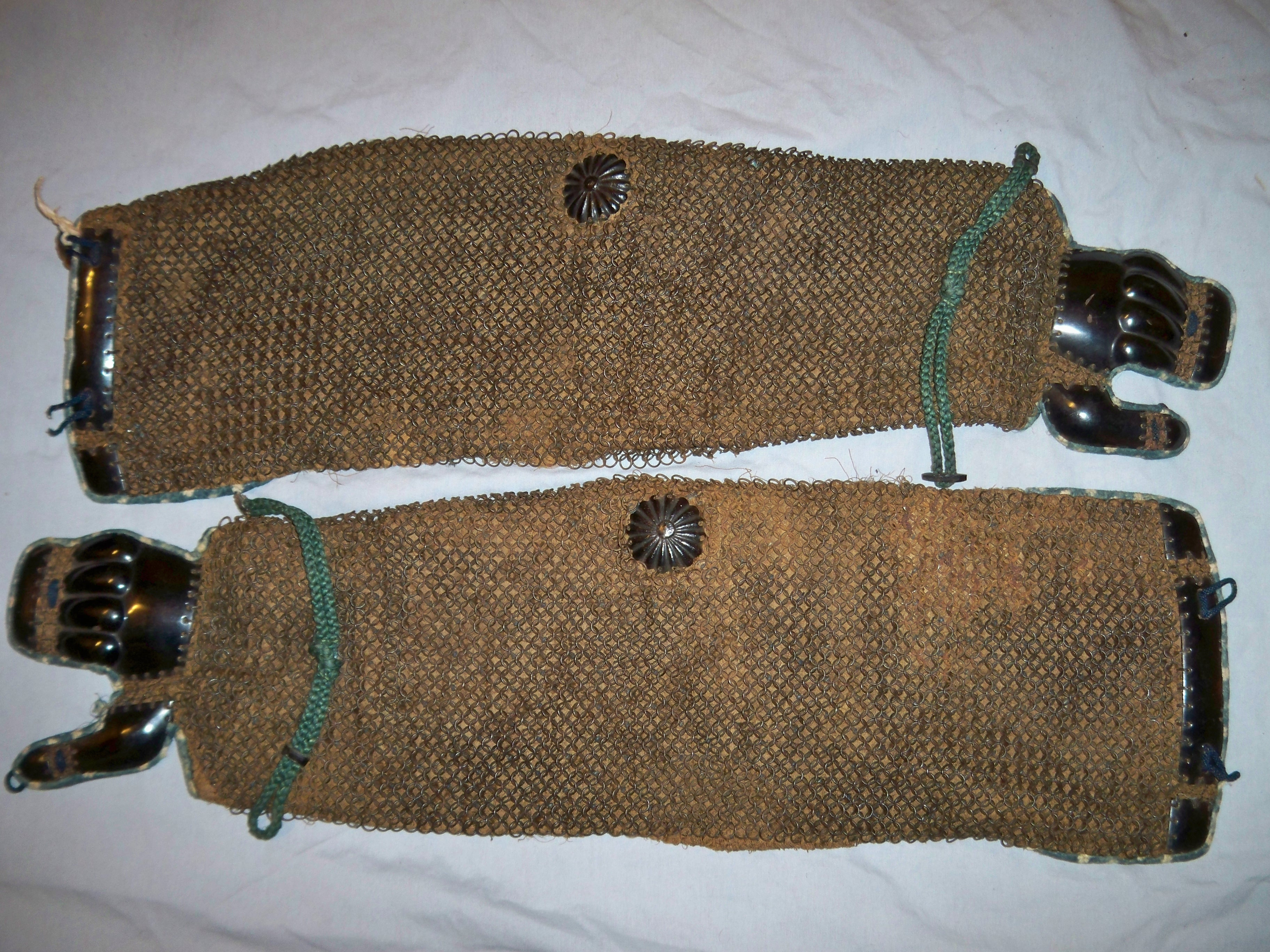
Kusari kote (chain armour sleeves)

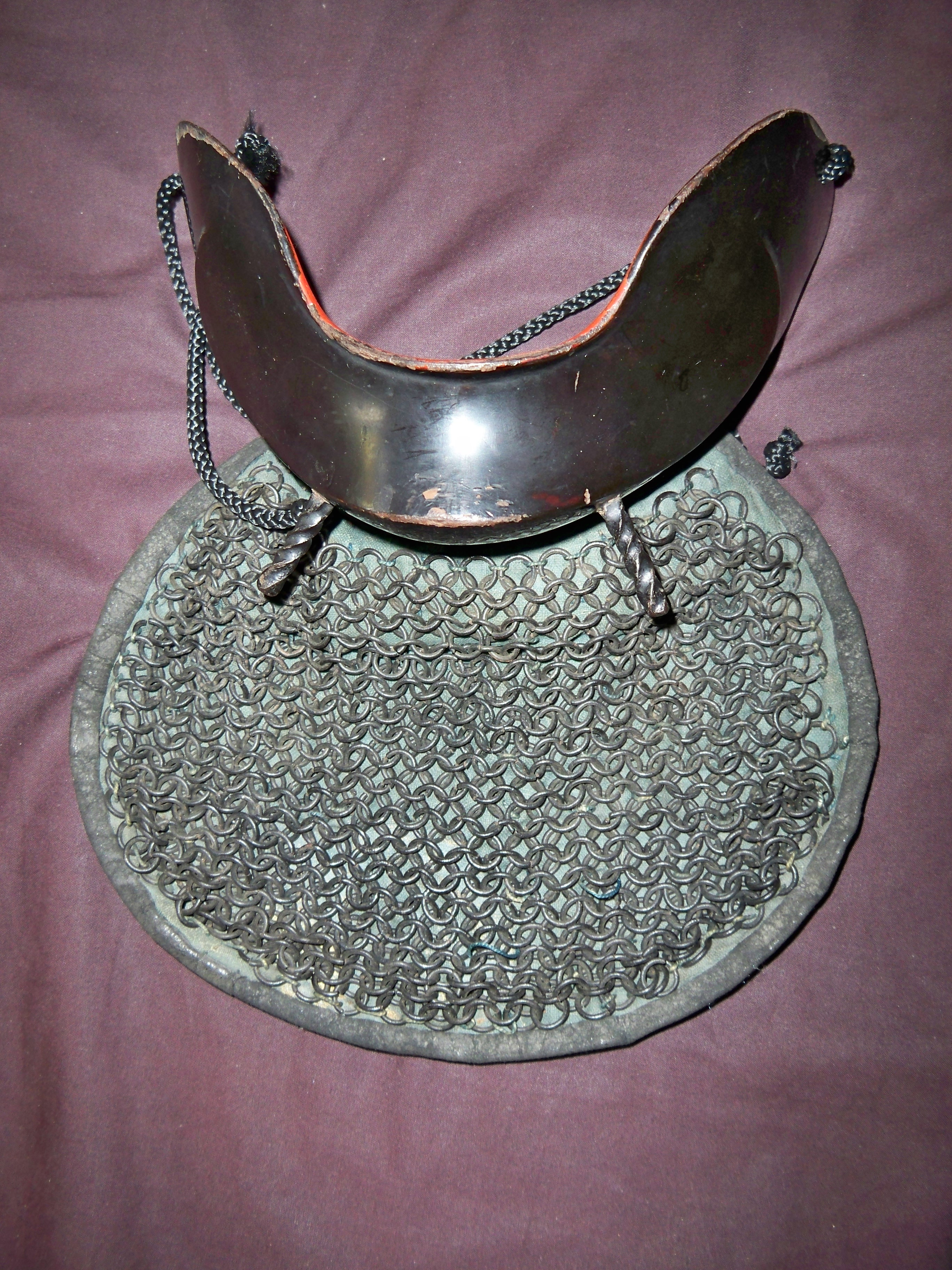
Hanpo (half mask) with kusari yodare kaki (chain armour throat guard)

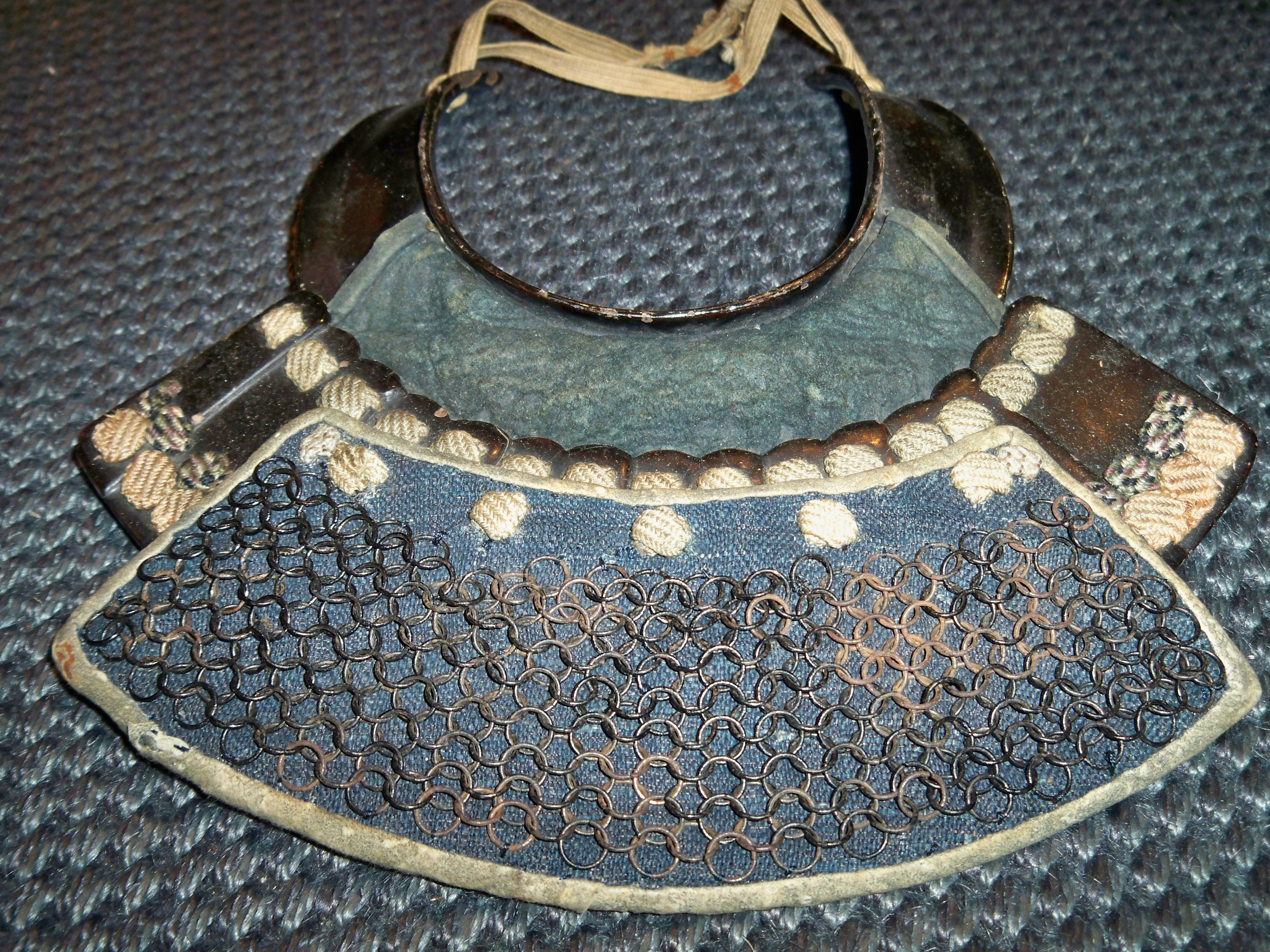
Nodowa (throat guard) with kusari

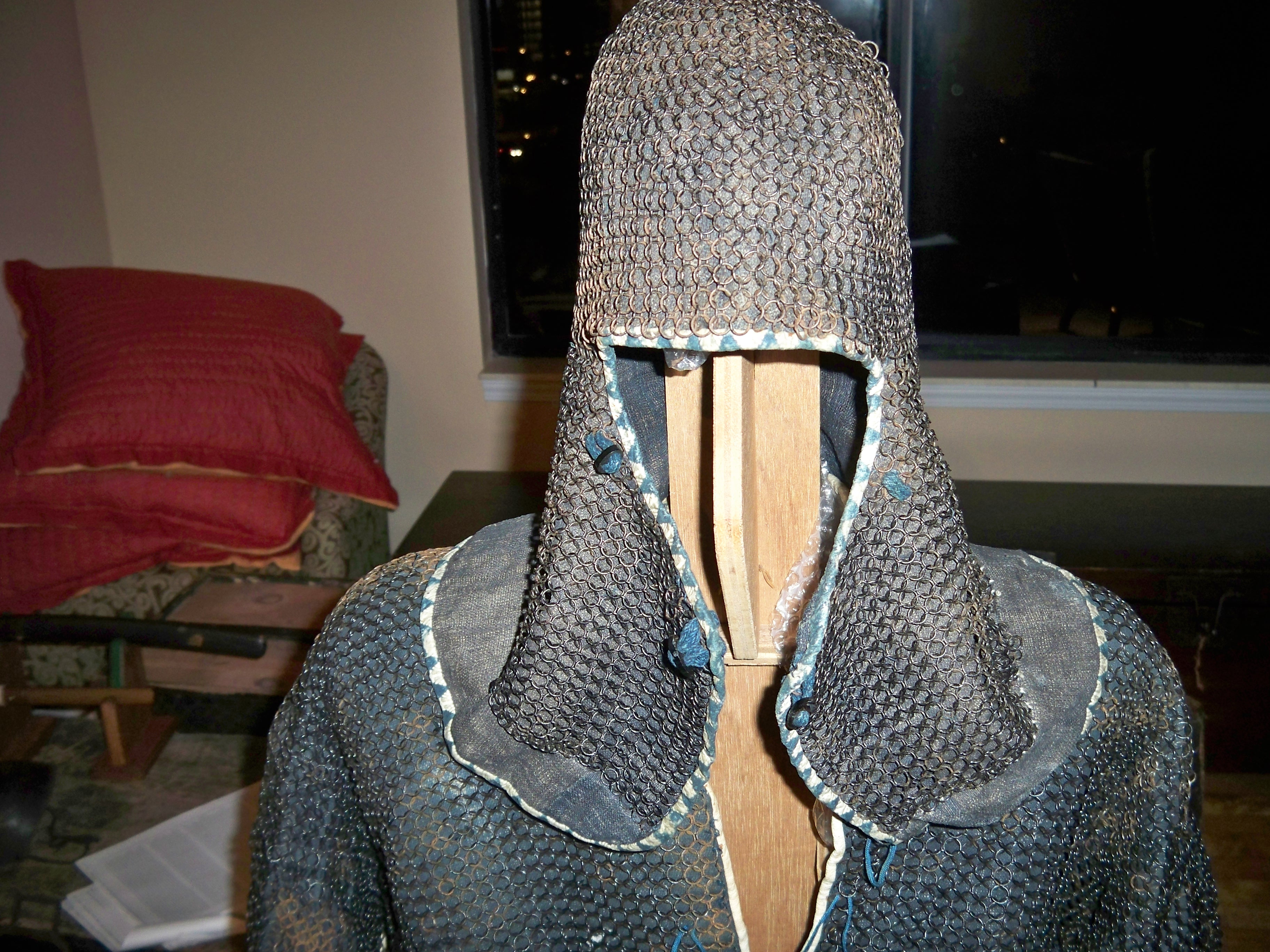
Kusari zukin (chain armour hood)

== See also ==
- Japanese armour
- Karuta (Japanese armour)
- Kikko (Japanese armour)
- Mail (armour)
- Tatami (Japanese armour)
