= Kenneth Webster =

Kenneth Webster may refer to:

- Kenneth G. T. Webster (1871–1942), Canadian-born American literary scholar
- Kenneth Athol Webster (1906–1967), art collector and dealer
