= James Thomas Hooper =

British art and ethnological collector

James Thomas Hooper (1 September 1897 – 9 February 1971) was a British collector of ethnographic artifacts of the Inuit, Native American, Oceanic and African peoples.

== Early life ==
Hooper was born in North Wraxall-Wiltshire in 1897 and began collecting in 1912 when his father gave him a native spear.

== Collecting ==
He became an employee of the Thames Conservancy Board but collecting was his obsession. He scoured flea markets and small antique shops in rural England for items of interest as well as purchasing from auction houses, private museums and house sales. He also organised exchanges with other dealers and collectors such as William Ockelford Oldman and Kenneth Athol Webster.

At the height of his collecting in the 1950s, he was one of the top four collectors of pacific ethnographic material in the United Kingdom. Others included Kenneth Athol Webster and William Ockelford Oldman. Hooper's interest in collecting this material was ethnological rather than aesthetic. Like Oldman, Hooper never left Great Britain to visit the cultures that created the material he enjoyed.

== Totems Museum ==
After his retirement, Hooper opened the Totems Museum in Arundel, Sussex, United Kingdom in a two-story building on the High Street. He ran this museum between 1957 and 1963. The ground-floor rooms were packed full of his ethnographic collection while he and his grandson, Steven Hooper, lived in the rooms above. The British Pathe newsreel film dated 9 December 1957 follows a couple visiting the Totems Museum. While the film gives little information when describing the treasures of the museum, close attention to the background and general shots of the interior of the museum give an excellent insight into the size, diversity and quality of Hooper's collection.

== Publications ==
In 1954, he co-authored the publication The Art of Primitive Peoples with Cottie Arthur Burland. In it, Hooper concentrates on the art of Polynesia, Melanesia, North Coast of America, Eskimo, West Africa and the Congo. His text is illustrated with 116 photographs of items from his collection taken by R.H. Bomback. Soon after the opening of the Totems Museum, he published a guide booklet titled The Totems Museum, High Street, Arundel, Sussex : exhibiting the Hooper Collection of primitive art from Africa, the Pacific islands, New Zealand and the Americas. This was also illustrated. The Hooper Collection was also documented through photography as Hooper allowed visitors and researchers to photograph his collections. Photographs of works from his collection can be found in the collection of the Metropolitan Museum of Art.

== Legacy and fate of collection ==
Hooper's collection continued to be documented after his death in 1971. His collection was the subject of a book by his grandson Steven Phelps – now known as Steven Hooper. Art and Artifacts of the Pacific, Africa and the Americas: The James Hooper Collection was published in 1976 and featured 250 illustrations. Soon after this book was published, parts of the collection began to be auctioned by Christie's. Between 1976 and 1982 there were at least six auctions of material from the James Hooper Collection. The auctions included African Art from the James Hooper Collection held on 14 July 1976 at Christie's London, American Indian Art from the James Hooper Collection held on 9 Nov 1976 at Christie's London, Hawaiian and Maori Art from the James Hooper Collection held on 21 June 1977 at Christie's London, Melanesian and Polynesian Art from the James Hooper Collection held on 19 June 1979 at Christie's London, Oceanic Art From the James Hooper Collection held on 17 June 1980 at Christie's London. and Important Tribal Art held on 7 July 1982 at Christie's London.

== Museums holding items from the Hooper collection ==
Museums around the world now own items from the James Hooper collection, either as a result of successful bidding at these auctions or through the generosity of other successful bidders. Items from his collection can be found in the collections of

- the Museum of New Zealand Te Papa Tongarewa
- the British Museum
- the Metropolitan Museum of Art
- the Canadian Museum of Civilization
- the Museum of Fine Arts, Boston
