= James Hooper =

James Hooper may refer to:

- James Hooper (climber) (born 1987), British mountain climber and adventurer
- James Thomas Hooper (1897–1971), British collector of ethnographic artifacts
- James Hooper (journalist), Australian rugby league journalist
- James Hooper (footballer) (born 1997), English footballer
- J. Robert Hooper (1936–2008), American politician and member of the Maryland Senate

== See also ==
- James E. Hooper House, a historic home in Baltimore, Maryland, United States
