= George Coldham =

Town clerk of Nottingham

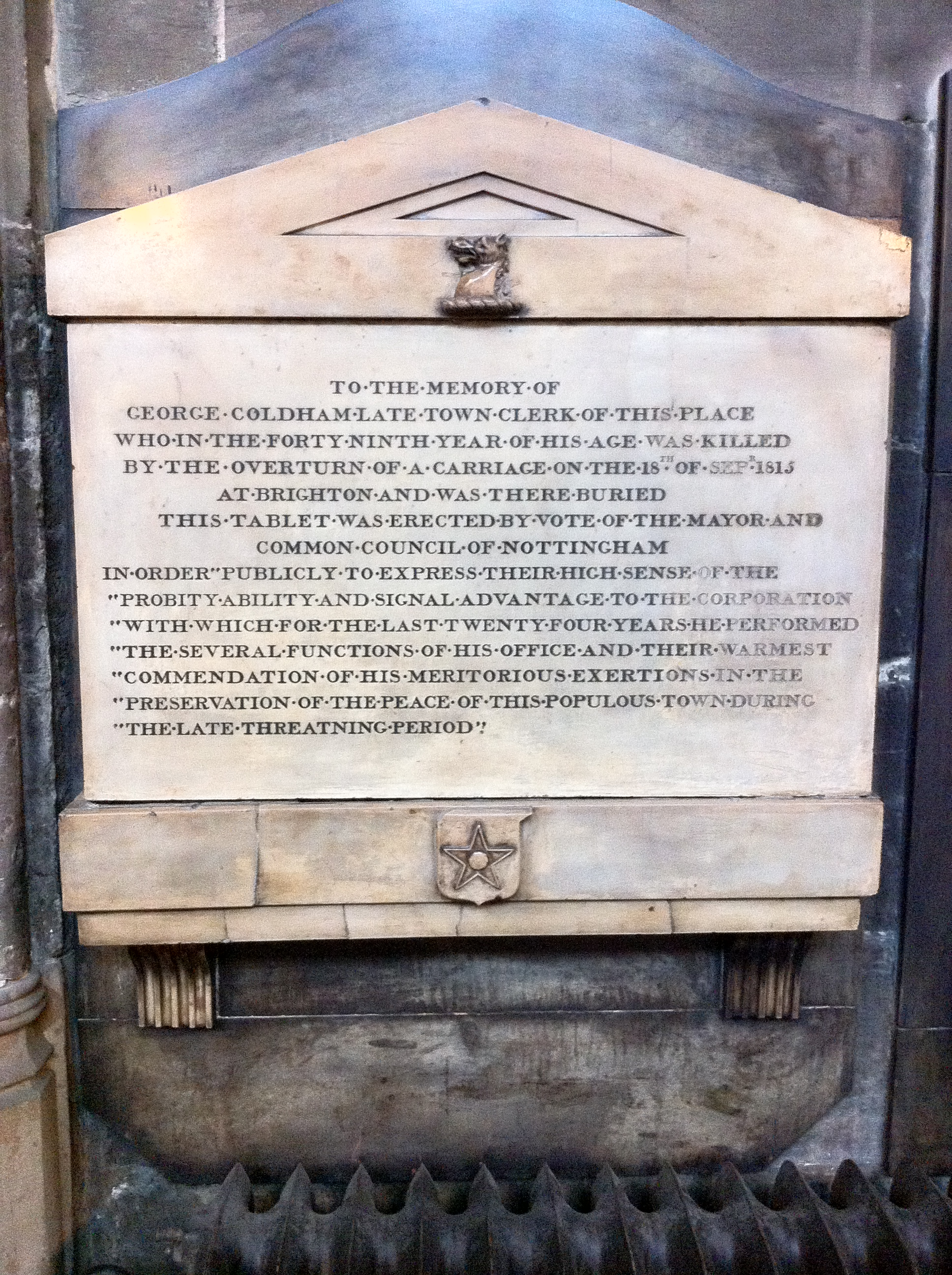
Memorial in St Mary's Church, Nottingham

George Coldham (16 April 1766 – 18 September 1815) was Town Clerk to the Corporation of Nottingham from 1791 to 1815.

== Career ==
He was born in Norwich in 1766 and educated from 1775 to 1781 at the school in Palgrave, Suffolk. In 1782 he worked as a clerk for his uncle, Edward Coldham, a solicitor at Bury St Edmunds, but he moved to London where he worked on Broad Street as an attorney at law. He was elected Town Clerk of Nottingham on 27 December 1791.

He is best known for obtaining a verdict in the case of James v. Green in 1795 establishing a right of levying a county-rate, which relieved the Corporation of Nottingham of many municipal expenses.

In Nottingham he joined with Richard Enfield to form the firm of Coldham and Endfield in Rose Yard, now known as King John’s Chambers. The poet Henry Kirke White was articled here.

He was in Brighton on 18 September 1815, returning in a gig with T. Buckley coming down Church Hill in Brighton, when the horse took fright and ran away. When it hit a post, it overturned, and Coldham landed on his head and was killed. He was buried in the parish church in Brighton, and a memorial erected in St Mary's Church, Nottingham by the Mayor of Nottingham and the Council. He was succeeded as Town Clerk of Nottingham by Henry Enfield.
