= George Cameron Stone =

American engineer and writer (1859–1935)

- Born: August 6, 1859
- Died: November 18, 1935 (aged 76); New York City, New York
- Education: Columbia School of Mines (Ph.B.)
- Occupations: Engineer; writer

George Cameron Stone (August 6, 1859 – November 18, 1935) was a well-known American arms collector and author as well as an American mining engineer and metallurgist. He authored a glossary of the antique weapons of the world that remains one of the most comprehensive works ever written on the subject.

== Biography ==
George Cameron Stone was originally from Geneva, New York. He graduated in 1879 with a Bachelor of Philosophy from the Columbia School of Mines. In 1880, Stone became a member of the American Institute of Mining and Metallurgical Engineers (AIME). By 1882, Stone was employed as a mining engineer at the New Jersey Zinc and Iron Company. He was later promoted to chief engineer and chief metallurgist. Stone developed and held eight patents relating to the industrial application of metallurgy and published more than 50 articles on the subject as well. In 1912, he became secretary of board of directors with the American Institute of Mining and Metallurgical Engineers, later on he served as a member of the board and as treasurer.

During World War I, Stone served the U.S. government as head of the Non-Ferrous Metals section of the War Industries Board (WIB). He retired in 1929 at the age of 70. In 1935, a few months prior to his death, Stone was awarded the James Douglas Medal for his achievements in the field of non-ferrous metallurgy.

Stone died on November 18, 1935, at a hospital in New York City.

== Collection of Arms and Armor ==
Early on in his childhood, Stone began to show an interest in weapons. He acquired the first item with which he started his collection at an auction in New York, a Persian gun, shortly after graduation. His first published article on weapons in the Magazine of Antique Firearms (1911–1912) was about a set of rifles, one of which is likely to be said Persian gun.

Stone must have thought rather early about the publication of an arms and armor glossary as his correspondence with the director of the Peabody Museum in Salem (now: Peabody Essex Museum), Massachusetts, Lawrence Jenkins (1872–1961) demonstrates as Stone requests images on a variety of Asian arrows. Stone is furthermore assisted and supported by the respective curators of the Metropolitan Museum of Art, Bashford Dean (1867–1928) and Dean's successor, Stephen V. Grancsay (1897–1980). Grancsay assisted Stone especially with regard to European weaponry.

At the time of his death, Stones collection of more than 5,000 items; all of which were stored or displayed in his house at W. 11th Street in New York. Stone bequeathed approximately 3,500 items to the Metropolitan Museum of Art, of which 360 (non-oriental) items were transferred to the Peabody Museum. Stone also bequeathed over 1,400 Japanese sword mountings to the Cooper Union Museum (now: Cooper Hewitt, Smithsonian Design Museum) in New York, including 600 tsuba.

== Acquisition of Arms and Armor ==
Stone's main source of items for his collection was most like the English dealer of tribal art and ethnographic materials William Ockelford Oldman, who is known to have provided Stone's friend Carl Otto von Kienbusch with collectibles. Oldman's practice was to send interesting items to the collectors who then chose an item and returned the remainder to Oldman.

Due to the position Stone held with the Zinc Company, he was required to frequently travel throughout the world. Stone used this opportunity to visit arms dealers whenever possible in search for new items for his collection:

- 1918: Honolulu, Samoa, Pago Pago, Rarotonga, New Zealand, Australia
- 1919: England, France, Belgium, accompanied by Otto von Kienbusch and his wife Mildred Clarke Pressinger von Kienbusch (1887–1968)
- 1928: North Africa (Marrakesh, Fès, Algiers, Tunis, Cairo), Turkey (Constantinople), Greece (Athens), Italy (Naples, Rome, Florence, Venice), stopping in Paris and London on his way home
- 1932: Istanbul (Turkey) and Corinth (Greece)

== Publications ==
- 1911: Early Flintlocks. Magazine of Antique Firearms, Vol. II (1) .
- 1934: A Glossary of the Construction, Decoration, and Use of Arms and Armor in All Countries and in All Times: Together with Some Closely Related Subjects. Portland, Maine: Southwork Press.

== Sources ==
LaRocca, Donald J. 1999. "Introduction" in: A Glossary of the Construction, Decoration and Use of Arms and Armor: in All Countries and in All Times. Mineola, New York: Dover Publications. ISBN 978-0-486-40726-5
