= Kenneth Athol Webster =

New Zealand collector and dealer

- Born: 17 December 1906; Wellington, New Zealand
- Died: 5 October 1967 (aged 60)
- Occupation: Collector

Kenneth Athol Webster (17 December 1906 – 5 October 1967) was a collector and dealer of manuscripts, fine art and ethnographic artifacts associated with Oceanic peoples.

Webster was born in Wellington, New Zealand to Henry Arthur Webster and his wife Annie Harriett (née Edwards). He was educated at Wellington College and did clerical work before farming in the King Country. In 1936 he moved to London and worked in a factory until 1939 when he served in the Royal Army Ordnance Corps. In 1944 he married Leila Mossman. After 1945 he began to collect ethnographic antiquities, manuscripts and fine art. He soon turned this from a hobby into a vocation and became a dealer specially focussed on the Oceanic area including New Zealand, Australia and the Pacific.

Like his contemporary William Ockelford Oldman who was also a collector dealer, he found his treasures in the auction houses, car boot sales, antique and second-hand shops of the United Kingdom and Europe. He purchased material from small British country museums who were disposing of their collections, and in one case, just before it was consigned to the local tip. He also purchased from and swapped with private collectors such as James Thomas Hooper. By the 1950s he joined William Ockelford Oldman and James Thomas Hooper as one of the top four collectors of ethnographic art in the United Kingdom. Such was the prominent position of these three that the provenance of a large percentage of Oceanic ethnographic material in museums today includes one or more of these collectors.

Although Webster continued to add to his private collection he also supplied numerous museums and private collectors with material. Items sourced from Webster are found in

- the Museum of New Zealand Te Papa Tongarewa
- the Otago Museum
- the Alexander Turnbull Library which purchased his collection of New Zealand manuscripts from the dealer Maggs Brothers in 1970
- the British Museum

Webster also strongly believed in the repatriation of Maori ethnographic material back to New Zealand. He was influential in ensuring the Armytage collection returned to New Zealand and also assisted with the sale of William Oldman's Pacific collection to the New Zealand government in 1948. Webster offered part of his own collection to the New Zealand government in 1962 but the New Zealand government declined to purchase it. Since then the collection has been offered for sale at auctioneers Dunbar Sloane. The first part of the collection was auctioned on 21 November 2002 and there were further auctions planned for late 2010 and early 2011.

Webster also published on his collection. In 1948 he published a book on the Armytage collection of Maori jade. He also wrote for Apollo (1951) and for the Journal for the Polynesian Society (1956 and 1957).
