= George Hooper =

George Hooper may refer to:

- George Hooper (bishop) (1640–1727), English bishop
- George K. Hooper (1868–1939), American engineer and architect
- George Hooper (artist) (1910–1994), British artist
- Arthur George Hooper (1857–1940), British Liberal Party politician
