= Adams Express Building =

Office skyscraper in Manhattan, New York

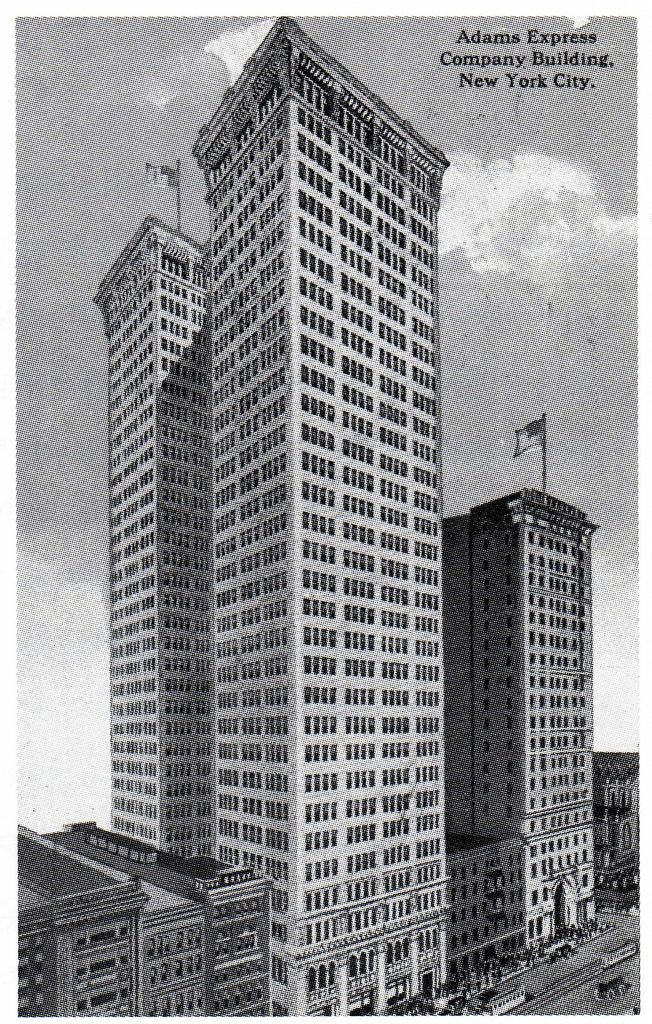
- A 1914 postcard featuring the Adams Express Co. Building
- Interactive map of the Adams Express Building area

General information
- Type: Office
- Architectural style: Palazzo
- Location: Financial District, Manhattan, 61 Broadway, New York City
- Coordinates: 40°42′25″N 74°00′46″W
- Construction started: 1912
- Completed: 1914
- Cost: $66,724,138
- Owner: Aareal Bank

Height
- Height: 443 ft (135.0 m)

Technical details
- Structural system: Steel
- Material: Terracotta facade
- Floor count: 32
- Floor area: 670,000 sq ft (62,245 m^{2})

Design and construction
- Architect: Francis H. Kimball
- Main contractor: Robert E. Dowling

The Adams Express Building is an office building at 61 Broadway in the Financial District of Manhattan in New York City. The building's primary frontage is on 57–61 Broadway, with additional frontage along 33–41 Trinity Place. Architect Francis Kimball designed the 32-story building for the Adams Express Company.

Construction began in 1912 at which point the cost was estimated at $2,000,000 (equivalent to $66,724,138 in 2025). Upon completion in 1914, the building was the seventh tallest structure in Manhattan.

== Architecture ==
The building contains 3,300 tons of steel and over a million square feet of architectural terracotta. The New York Times described the architectural style as "Florentine" below the fifth floor, and "severely simple" above. Another critic called the style "utterly utilitarian," but the New York City Landmarks Preservation Commission identified the architecture as palazzo.

An entrance was constructed to the New York City Subway's Wall Street station, underneath Broadway, but was later closed.

== History ==
=== Background ===
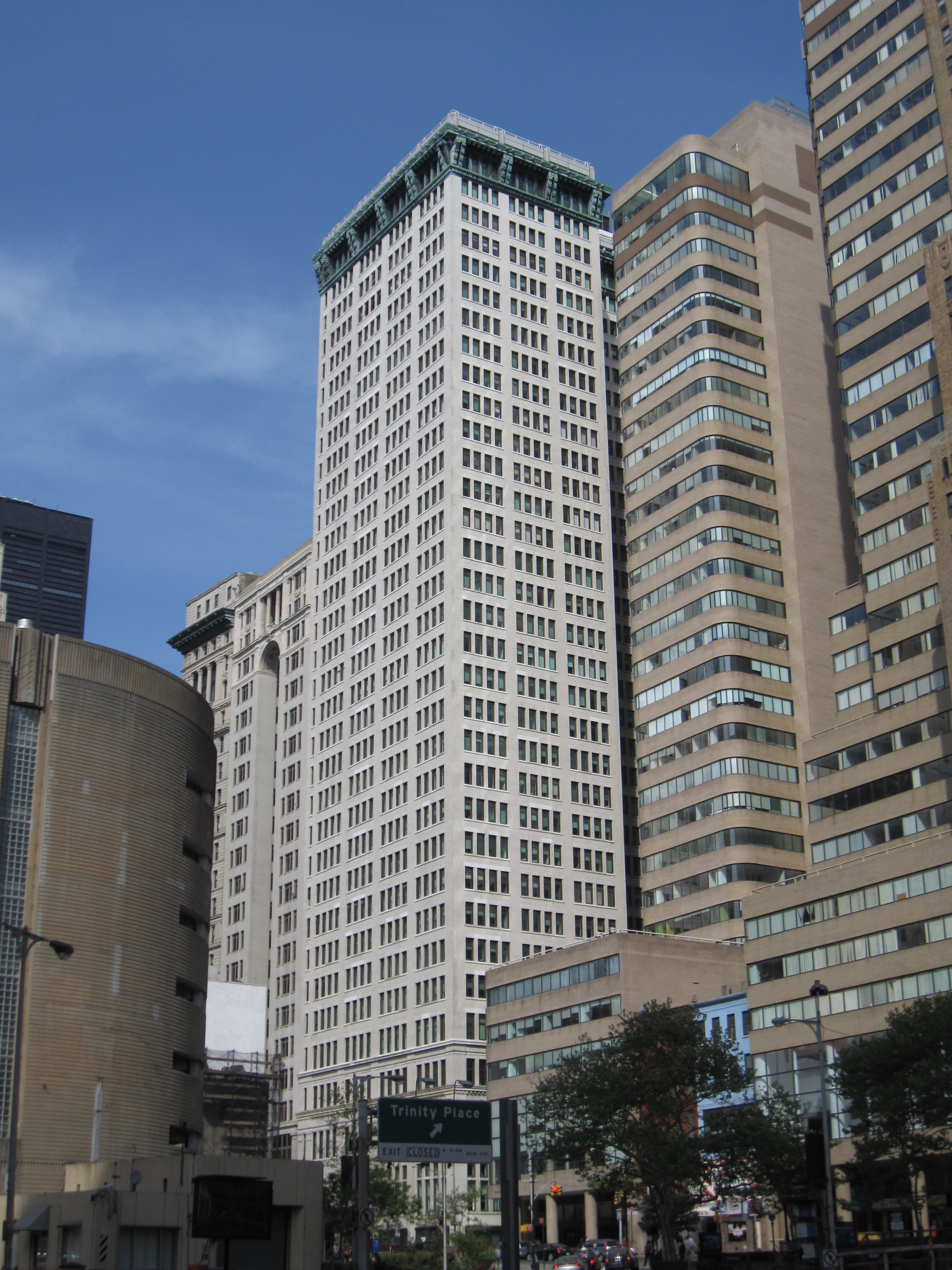
Seen from the southwest

The Adams Express Company occupied part of the Pinkerton Building at 57–59 Broadway. In 1903, there was discussion of combining 57–61 Broadway with an adjacent property occupied by American Express and Wells Fargo, and building one large building for the three companies. This did not happen, and American Express's adjacent building at 65 Broadway was completed in 1917.

A 1904 fire that began in the basement of the Morris Building at 63 Broadway, damaged the Pinkerton and other buildings on the block. Twenty-four engines and six hook and ladder companies responded. The Fire Department of New York recorded that the Adams Express Company building was destroyed, but Adams Express continued to occupy the site. By 1906, Adams Express was planning a new, fireproof building to be constructed on the site of the Pinkerton Building.

=== Construction ===
In 1910 Industrial World Magazine reported that Adams Express was proceeding with a 10-story, brick and limestone building designed by George K. Hooper of Hooper-Faulkenau Engineering Company. Then in 1911, Adams Express finally purchased the Pinkerton Building. Although Hooper's plans would have blended with existing buildings in the Financial District where, in 1912, nearly half of the buildings were five stories or lower, the Hooper design was never constructed, as it was apparently too small. Instead, in 1912, Francis Kimball was hired to build a 32-story structure.

When construction began in 1912 on the Kimball design, first The New York Times and later city planners became concerned about sunlight and airspace. The Adams Express Building was one of a growing number of behemoths, most notably the then-under-construction Equitable Building, that cast shadows not only on the street but on nearby smaller buildings and drove down real estate value, rent, and tax revenues. F.W. Fitzpatrick complained that the Adams Express Building cast an 875-foot shadow. The 1916 Zoning Resolution provided a remedy in the form of setbacks where new buildings would be stepped back at certain heights depending on the width at the street. The restrictions would have applied to 75% of the ground area of the building, but construction of the Adams Express Building had occurred before the new zoning restrictions were adopted.

=== Later history ===
The building sustained heavy damage in 1916 when 300 windows were blown out in the Black Tom explosion.

When the building was purchased by Metropolitan Life Insurance Company in 1988, an engineer discovered goldfish living in a pool of water below the basement heating system. Since that time, building engineers have fed the fish as a part of their regular maintenance routine. Between 2008 and 2015, the building underwent over $13 million worth of renovations.

RXR Realty bought the Adams Express Building from Broad Street Development for $330 million in May 2014. RXR placed the building for sale in September 2015 with an asking price of $450 million. and agreed to sell a 49 percent stake in the property that December for about $220 million. The next year, RXR received a $290 million loan from SL Green and Bank of China. RXR considered converting 61 Broadway to apartments in February 2023, amid increased vacancy rates due to the COVID-19 pandemic. RXR ceded control of 61 Broadway that May, having defaulted on a $240 million loan, and handed the building back to their lender, Aareal Bank. The loan was placed for sale in September 2023, when the building had a 57 percent occupancy rate. RXR announced plans in 2025 to convert the ninth floor into 21 apartments. By the following February, RXR planned to convert the entirety of 61 Broadway into apartments, obtaining nearly $500 million in financing for the project.

== See also ==
- List of buildings and structures on Broadway in Manhattan
