= A Glossary of the Construction, Decoration, and Use of Arms and Armor in All Countries and in All Times =

1999 reference work by George Cameron Stone

A Glossary of the Construction, Decoration, and Use of Arms and Armor in All Countries and in All Times is a reference work written by George Cameron Stone.

== Contents ==
A Glossary of the Construction, Decoration, and Use of Arms and Armor in All Countries and in All Times is a glossary of more than 10,000 types of weapons and armor listed alphabetically from around the world.

== Reception ==
Lawrence Person reviewed A Glossary of the Construction, Decoration, and Use of Arms and Armor in All Countries and in All Times in The Space Gamer No. 73. Person commented that "This book has many strong points. [...] Those with an interest in Japanese weapons and armor will be very gratified by this volume. This book has 40 listings just for various types of boomerangs! The listings for knives and swords take almost a page each."
