= Lora Hooper =

American biologist

Lora V. Hooper is an American biologist, currently the Jonathan W. Uhr Distinguished Chair in Immunology and Nancy Cain and Jeffrey A. Marcus Scholar in Medical Research at University of Texas Southwestern Medical Center. In 2015, she was elected to the National Academy of Sciences.
