= David C. Hoopes =

David Craig Hoopes (born August 15, 1942) was special assistant to the U.S. President from 1971 to 1977 and later an investment adviser.

Hoopes was born to Lorenzo Hoopes and his wife, Stella, in Twin Falls, Idaho. As a young man he served a mission for the Church of Jesus Christ of Latter-day Saints (LDS Church) in Argentina. He received a bachelor's degree in political science and a master's degree in International Public Administration from Brigham Young University.

Hoopes then received a Master of Public Administration and Ph.D. from the University of Southern California. While working on these degrees he served as president of Anthony Craig & Associates in Los Angeles. He was also a consultant to a California legislative committee on reorganizing the Los Angeles Unified School District.

In 1971, Hoopes joined the Nixon Administration and was made Special Assistant to the President in 1974. After Gerald Ford lost his bid for re-election, Hoopes returned to the private sector, working for Bechtel Corporation.

From 1998 to 2001, Hoopes was president of the LDS Church's Chile Santiago South Mission. From 2004 to 2007, he was president of the Caracas Venezuela Temple. He also served as an LDS Church bishop.

Hoopes married Diane Tuttle, the daughter of A. Theodore Tuttle, an LDS Church general authority. They are the parents of seven children.

== Sources ==
- bio from registry of Hoopes papers at Nixon Library
- "New mission presidents", Church News, March 14, 1998
