= George K. Hooper =

George Kennard Hooper
- Born: July 1, 1868; Boston
- Died: February 9, 1939 (aged 70); Pasadena, California
- Occupation(s): Engineer, Architect

George Kennard Hooper (July 1, 1868 – February 9, 1939) was an engineer and architect in New York City. Later he became city engineer in Pasadena, California.

== Early life ==
Hooper was born in Boston on July 1, 1868. His father, George Kennard Hooper, was a local merchant. He was educated in Boston Public Schools, graduating from Dwight School in 1883.

Hooper entered Massachusetts Institute of Technology in 1887, graduating in mechanical engineering in the class of 1891.

== Engineering and Architecture ==
Hooper designed foundries and industrial plants during much of his career. Nelson Valve Company and Otis Elevator Company were noted clients. He worked with architect Louis Sullivan on an addition to the Crane Company factory in Bridgeport, Connecticut and other projects.

In 1910 Hooper designed a 10-story building for the Adams Express Company, but the building was never constructed.

== Military service ==
Hooper was president of Hooper-Faulkenau Engineering Company, and toward the end of World War I both he and Arthur Falkenau joined the US Army. Lt. Col. Hooper was in charge of tank, track, truck, and trailer production. He resumed his duties at Hooper-Faulkenau in 1919.

== Pasadena ==
In the mid-1920s, Hooper moved to Pasadena, California to work as a civil engineer for the city. He became City Engineer in 1929.

Hooper died February 9, 1939.
