= Margaret Miller Davidson =

American poet

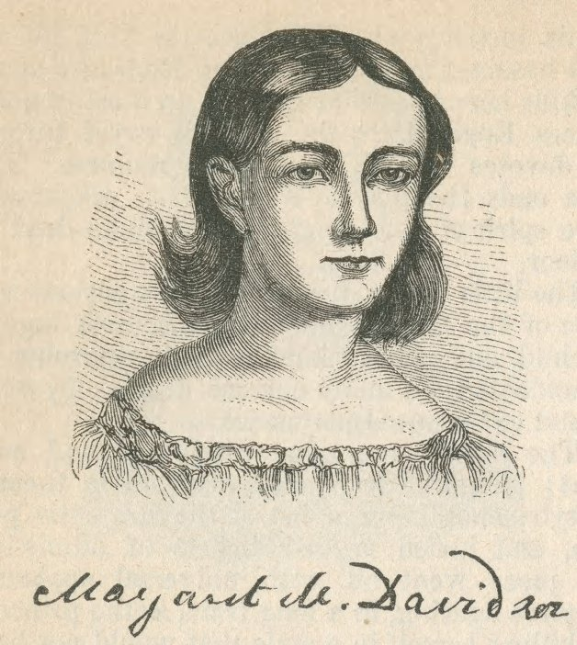
- Born: March 26, 1823 Plattsburgh, New York, US
- Died: November 25, 1838 (aged 15) Saratoga, New York, US
- Occupation: Poet

Margaret Miller Davidson (March 26, 1823 – November 25, 1838) was an American poet. Following in the footsteps of her sister Lucretia Maria Davidson, Margaret wrote from a young age, producing a body of poems and a diary. Her work was edited by Washington Irving after her death by tuberculosis at age fifteen.

Professor Walter Harding wrote in the mid-twentieth century that Davidson "was once of the best-known poets in America."

== Biography ==
Margaret Miller Davidson was born March 26, 1823, in Plattsburg, New York. She was the youngest daughter of Oliver and Margaret Davidson. Her sister Lucretia died at age sixteen when Margaret was two years old, and her mother encouraged Margaret's literary development; her mother wrote of Lucretia's death that "on ascending to the skies, it seemed as if her poetic mantle fell like a robe of light on her infant sister." Margaret was tutored by her mother and never sent to school. At age six, she was reading the works of John Milton, Lord Byron, and Walter Scott.

Like her mother and sister Lucretia, Margaret was in frail health from birth. She spent the winter of 1832/1833 visiting a sister in Canada, where she fell ill to scarlet fever. The family moved frequently within New York in search of a healthier environment for the afflictions of the mother and daughter; between 1833 and 1838 they moved to Ballston, to the rural outskirts of New York City, back to Ballston, and then to Saratoga. Throughout her life, Davidson cared for her frequently ill mother and studied languages, philosophy, and history, in addition to writing poems and a diary.

Davidson died November 25, 1838, in Saratoga.

== Legacy ==
Washington Irving wrote Biography and poetical remains of the late Margaret Miller Davidson in 1841; by 1864 the book had twenty editions. Irving described meeting her at age eleven: "There was an intellectual beauty about this child that struck me." Edgar Allan Poe reviewed Davidson's work favorably, describing her longest poem, Lenore, "As the work of so mere a child, it is unquestionably wonderful."

In the 1971 biographical dictionary Notable American Women, scholar Carlin T. Kindilien wrote about the Davidson sisters' contemporary success:

In their brief lives, their poetry, and their sad deaths, the two sisters tapped several streams of romantic feeling. Poe called Margaret a "fairy child," an expression of the reverence for childhood evoked by the Davidsons' beauty, filial devotion, and innocence. Their early scribblings seemed to exemplify the untutored inspiration of the true artist; their shortened lives, blighted genius. In a world in which the individual was valued, yet death a familiar reality, their protracted sufferings and early deaths struck resonant chords in their admirers. Tubercular disease, in particular, was regarded with mingled fear and fascination, since its symptoms seemed to embody the romantic ideal of female beauty. [...] Forgotten today, Lucretia and Margaret Davidson served as a temporary focus for the inner feelings of an outwardly materialistic, expanding America.
