= Lorenzo Hoopes =

American business executive

Lorenzo Hoopes (November 5, 1913 – September 21, 2012) was an American business executive, government bureaucrat, and Church of Jesus Christ of Latter-Day Saints official.

Hoopes spent much of his career as an executive for Safeway. When he retired in 1979 he was the senior vice president at the business. He took a leave of absence from Safeway in 1953, during the administration of President Dwight D. Eisenhower, to serve as executive assistant to United States Secretary of Agriculture Ezra Taft Benson. Hoopes returned to Safeway in 1955.

== Biography ==
=== Early life and education ===
Hoopes grew up in Brigham City, Utah and graduated from Box Elder High School. He received a bachelor's degree from Weber State University and also studied at the University of Utah. He earned an MBA from Pepperdine University and did advanced management training at the Harvard Business School.

=== Career ===
As of January 2010, Hoopes was head of the Paramount Theatre Board in Oakland, California. The Paramount Theatre is a public institution with a board that appoints new members, with the consent of the city council and mayor, but in the past the decisions of the board have always been upheld. Hoopes was believed to be the person in Oakland who donated the largest amount of money to the Yes on Proposition 8 campaign, which caused some to seek to oust Hoopes from his unpaid volunteer position with the Paramount Theatre. He sat on the board of the theatre for nearly 30 years.

Hoopes served for 17 years as a member of the Oakland School board.

Hoopes served as chairman and member of the Board of the Foundation for American Agriculture; vice chairman and member of the Board of the Farm Foundation; president and member of California's Coordinating Council for Higher Education; chairman, director, and secretary of the National Dairy Council; and chairman and member of the National Advisory Council.

=== Personal life and Church service ===
Hoopes was a member of the Church of Jesus Christ of Latter-day Saints (LDS Church). Hoopes was serving as bishop of the Oakland California Ward, which included where the Oakland Temple now is, when the ground was broken for the church's first meetinghouse on that general site in about 1957. He later also served as president of the LDS Church's Oakland California Stake. He served as president of the church's England Bristol Mission from 1979 to 1982. He served as president of the Oakland Temple from 1985 to 1990.

His wife, Stella Bobbies Sorenson Hoopes, died on January 14, 1996. David C. Hoopes is one of their children.

== Sources ==
- Sept 21, 2012, Published on September 26, 2012
- January 18, 2010 article on opposition to Hoopes reappointment
- New York Times, January 20, 2010
- "Deaths", Church News, January 20, 1996
- Article on attempt to oust Hoopes
- list of presidents of the Oakland Temple
- bio of Hoopes from Utah State University
- Church News October 7, 2012.
