= Henry Kirke White =

English poet and hymn-writer

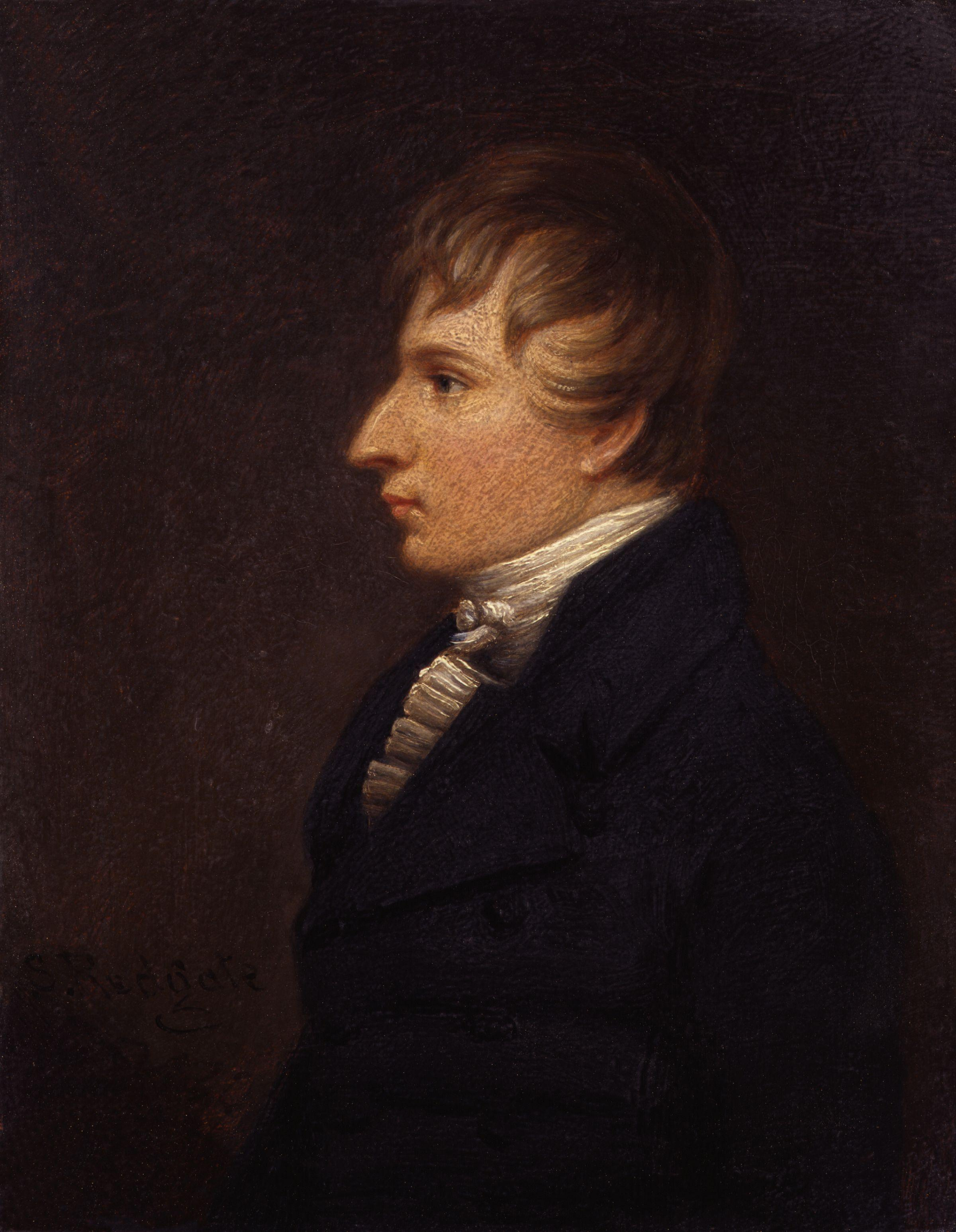
- Born: March 21, 1785; Nottingham, England
- Died: October 19, 1806 (aged 21); Cambridge, England
- Cause of death: Tuberculosis (Consumption)
- Education: St John's College, Cambridge
- Occupations: Poet; hymn-writer
- Writing career
- Period: Romanticism
- Genre: Hymnology

Henry Kirke White (21 March 1785 – 19 October 1806) was an English poet and hymn-writer. He died at the young age of 21.

== Life ==
White was born in Nottingham, the son of a butcher, a trade for which he was himself intended. However, he was greatly attracted to book-learning. By age seven, he was giving reading lessons (unbeknownst to the rest of the family, being offered after the household were abed) to a family servant. After being briefly apprenticed to a stocking-weaver, he was articled to a lawyer, George Coldham. While in this position, he excelled in studying Latin and Greek. When his health deteriorated due to tuberculosis, his employers gave him leave of absence for a month. He chose to live in Wilford at the crossroads, opposite Wilford House between 1804 and 1805. He drew inspiration for much of his poetry from Wilford and the surrounding area.

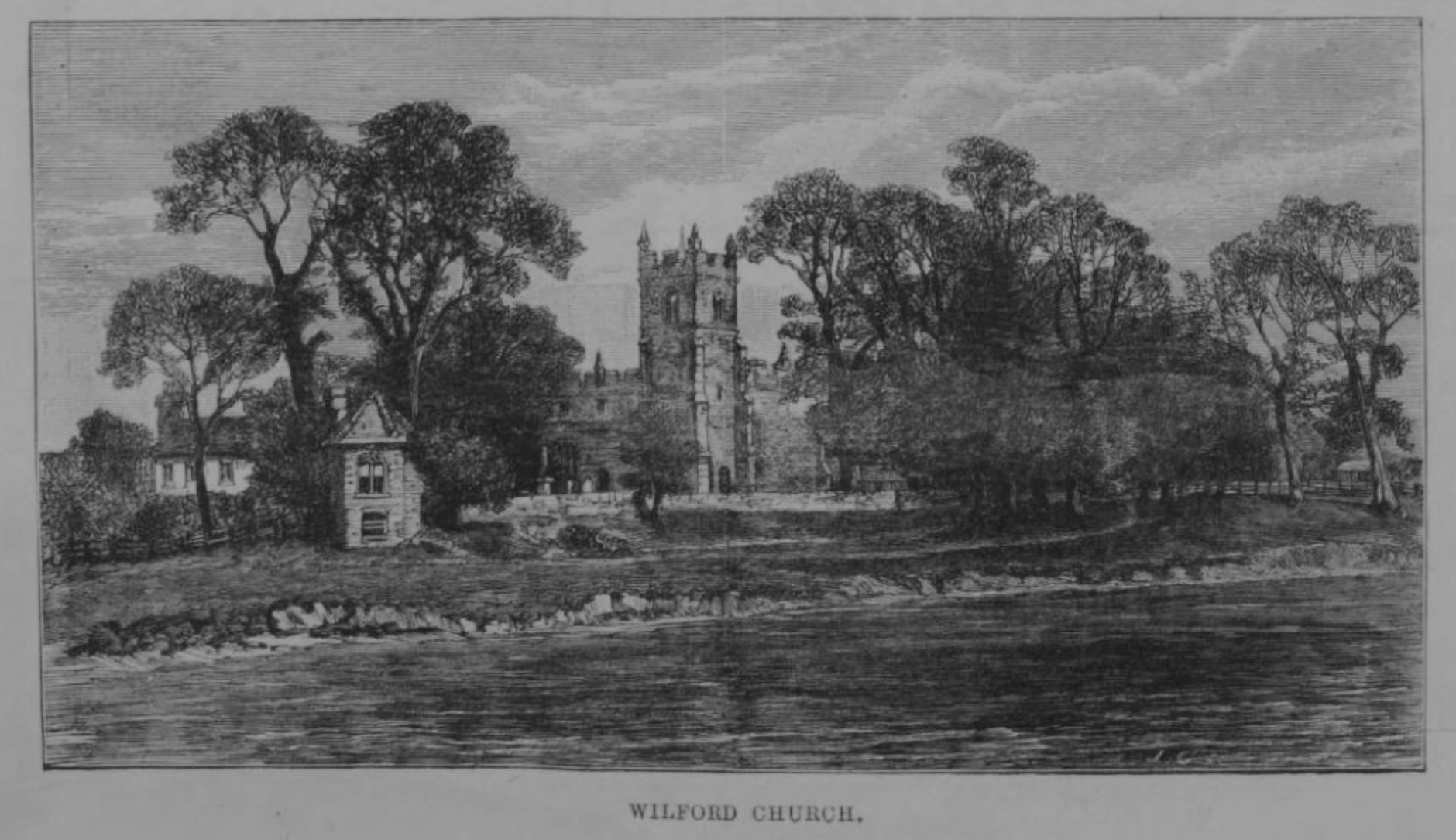
St Wilfrid's Church and Gazebo, Illustrated London News, 7 July 1888

He wrote many of his poems in the gazebo which stands in the grounds of St Wilfrid's Church, Wilford. Here he wrote:-

Here would I wish to sleep, this is the spot
Which I have long marked out to lay my bones in.
Tired out and wearied with the riotous world,
Beneath this yew would I be sepulchred.

Seeing the results of White's diligent studies and his deteriorating health, his master offered to release him from his contract if he had sufficient means to go to college. He received encouragement from Capel Lofft, the friend of Robert Bloomfield, and published in 1803, aged 17,Clifton Grove, a Sketch in Verse, with other Poems, dedicated to Georgiana, Duchess of Devonshire. One of the better known ones was 'The Fair Maid of Clifton' and another was 'Clifton Grove' in which were the controversial lines:-

Or, where the town’s blue turrets dimly rise,
And manufacture taints the ambient skies,
The pale mechanic leaves the lab’ring loom,
The air-pent hold, the pestilential room,
And rushes out, impatient to begin
The stated course of customary sin.

The book was violently attacked in the Monthly Review (February 1804), but White was rewarded with a kind letter from Robert Southey.

Through the efforts of his friends, he was able to enter St John's College, Cambridge, having spent a year beforehand with a private tutor, the Rev. Lorenzo Grainger, at Winteringham, Lincolnshire. Close application to study induced a serious illness—consumption was the disease, according to Sir Harris Nicholas's memoir—to which he ultimately became a victim, and to which White made many allusions in his poems and letters.

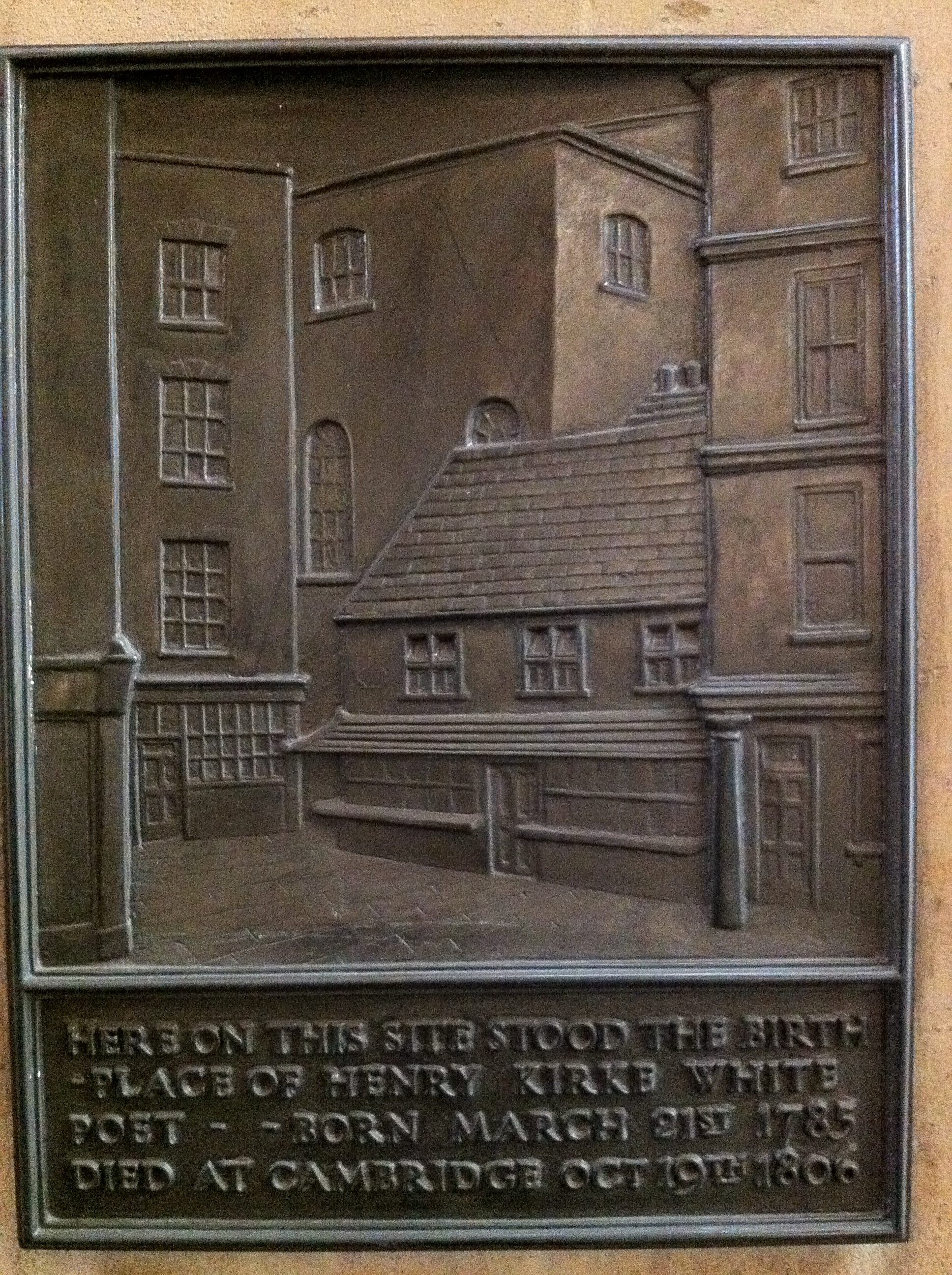
Plaque marking Kirke White's Birthplace

Fears were also entertained for his sanity, but he went into residence at Cambridge, with a view to taking holy orders, in the autumn of 1805. The strain of continuous study quickly worsened his already deteriorating health resulting in his death.

He was buried in All Saints' Church, Cambridge, which stood opposite the gates of St John's College, but has since been demolished. The monument marking the grave was sculpted by Francis Chantrey.

The genuine piety of his religious verses secured a place in popular hymnology for some of his hymns, in particular the still popular O Lord, another day is flown. Much of his fame was due to sympathy inspired by his early death; but Lord Byron agreed with Southey about the young man's promise. Robert Southey said of him: "...he could not rest satisfied till he had formed his principles upon the basis of Christianity."

A metal plaque can be seen in Exchange Arcade, Cheapside in Nottingham, on the site of Kirke White's birthplace. Originally a Holbrook plaque was erected on the actual dwelling but was removed when that was demolished prior to the erection of the Council House.

St Wilfrid's Church, Wilford contains two memorials. One is a marble plaque inside the nave, the second is a memorial stained glass window, c.1870, by O'Connor.

== Literary legacy ==
His Remains, with his letters (which along with White's poems contain many allusions to himself that they may almost be considered an autobiography) and an account of his life, were edited (5 vols., 1807–1822) by Robert Southey. See prefatory notices by Sir Harris Nicolas to his Poetical Works (new ed., 1866) in the Aldine Press British poets; by Harry Kirke Swann in the volume of selections (1897) in the Canterbury Poets; and by John Drinkwater to the edition in the "Muses' Library." See also John Thomas Godfrey and J. Ward, The Homes and Haunts of Henry Kirke White (1908). Lord Byron said of White in a tributary eulogy 'while life was in its spring, thy young muse just waved her joyous wing'. White's complete works were published in 1923.

== Hymns ==
- 'Oft in danger, oft in woe'
