= William Ockleford Oldman =

- Born: 24 August 1879; London, United Kingdom
- Died: 30 June 1949 (aged 69)
- Occupations: Collector & dealer of ethnographic
- Spouse: Dorothy K. Loney

William Ockleford Oldman (24 August 1879 – 30 June 1949) was a British collector and dealer of ethnographic art and European arms and armour. His business W.O. Oldman, Ethnographical Specimens, London was mostly active between the late 1890s and 1913.

Oldman purchased collections from various sources including items that were considered surplus from many small British museums. He produced a series of auction catalogues between 1901 and 1913 that were well illustrated with photographs and remain an important reference for collectors, subject experts and museums to this day. In addition to holding auctions he also reserved items for possible sale to private collectors and scholars. He maintained frequent correspondence with his network of collectors and he was often visited by museum professionals and scholars from institutions around the world. Oldman continued to deal in artifacts after 1913 but ceased to arrange auctions. Instead he sent out artefact lists to his contacts. These were also illustrated with photographs and were issued on a bi-weekly or monthly basis.

Ethnographic specimens with a provenance to Oldman's business can be found in various public institutions around the world including the National Museum of the American Indian, Pitt Rivers Museum, the British Museum and others. Items were either collected directly from Oldman or were part of donations from other significant collectors.

In addition to his business Oldman also had a substantial personal collection. His focus was on Oceania. Despite his particular interest in this area Oldman never travelled to the Pacific.

In June 1925 he married Dorothy K. Loney. In 1927 Oldman retired and created a private museum in his house at 43 Poynders Road, Clapham Park, London. The photographs of the interior of his house at this time show rooms packed with weapons, carvings, textiles, and weaving squeezed into every available space. Despite the bombing raids during World War II Oldman, his wife, and his collection remained in the house. All survived intact despite hits on houses in close proximity.

On 13 August 1948 Oldman sold his private collection of Oceanic material to the New Zealand Government for some 44,000 pounds sterling. The New Zealand Government distributed the collection to various regional museums including the Dominion Museum, the Auckland Museum, Canterbury Museum, Otago Museum and various others on long-term loan. In 1992 the Museum of New Zealand Te Papa Tongarewa Act was passed and the New Zealand Government, under section 26 of the act, transferred legal ownership and administration of the Oldman Collection to The Museum of New Zealand Te Papa Tongarewa. The collection remains distributed among the regional museums of New Zealand.

Less than a year later Oldman died on 30 June 1949. His widow sold the last of his stock to the British Museum in 1950.

The catalogue of Polynesian and Maori items in Oldman's private collection was published in sections in The Journal of the Polynesian Society based in the University of Auckland, New Zealand.

His business archive is also owned by the Museum of New Zealand Te Papa Tongarewa and includes collection ledgers and outward letter books. It is only partially digitised.
