= Jika-tabi =

Traditional Japanese split-toe boots

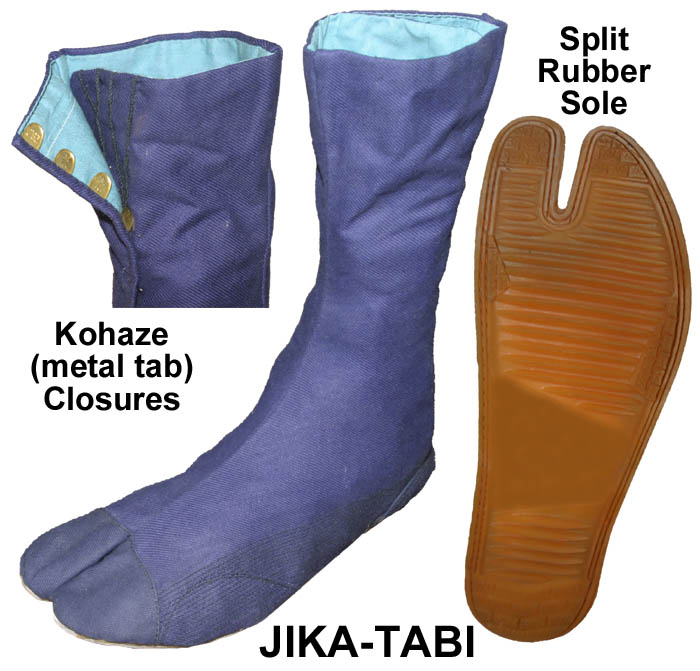
Anatomy of jika-tabi, showing the kohaze metal closures at the back of the boot, the rubber soles and the fabric upper portion

Jika-tabi (地下足袋, lit. "tabi that touch the ground") are a style of footwear with a divided toe, originating in Japan. They are similar to tabi socks in both appearance and construction. Though they can be worn with traditional thonged footwear such as geta and zōri, jika-tabi are mostly designed and made to be worn alone as outdoor footwear, resembling boots that reach roughly to the mid-calf. Jika-tabi are also known as 'tabi boots'.

== History ==
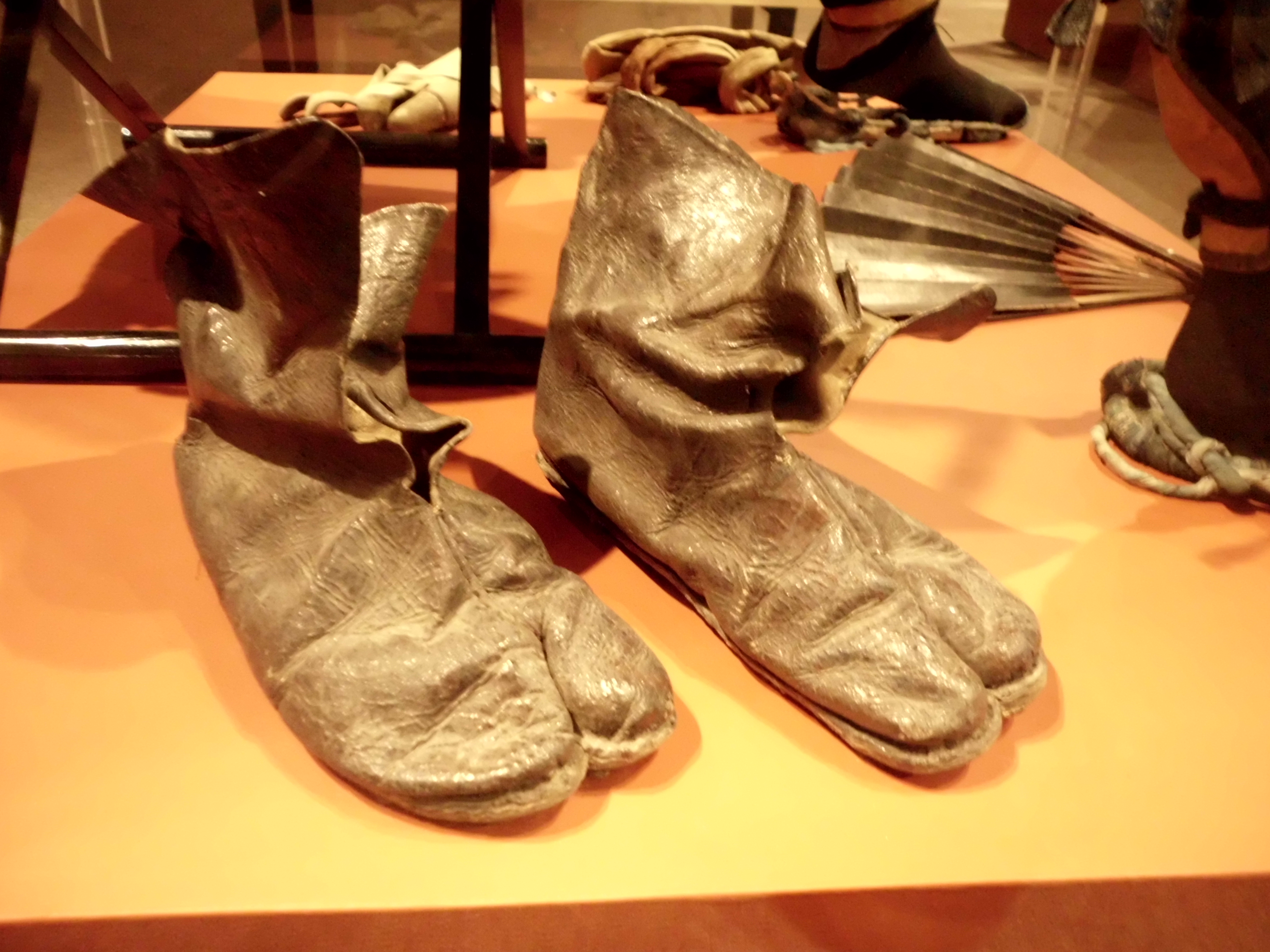
Leather tabi, Edo period (1603–1867), precursors to modern jika-tabi

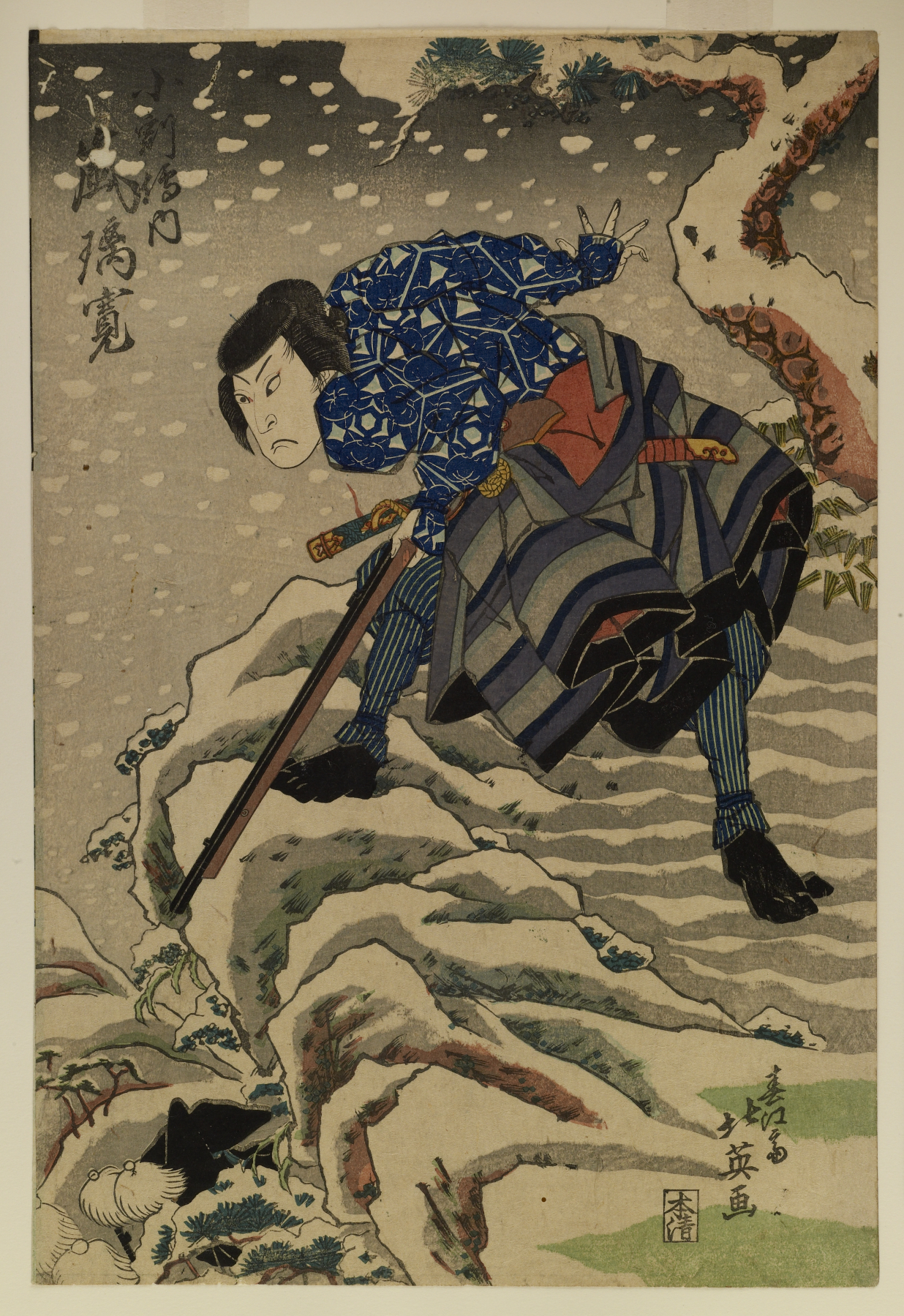
Late-Edo print of Arashi Rikan II wearing outdoor tabi

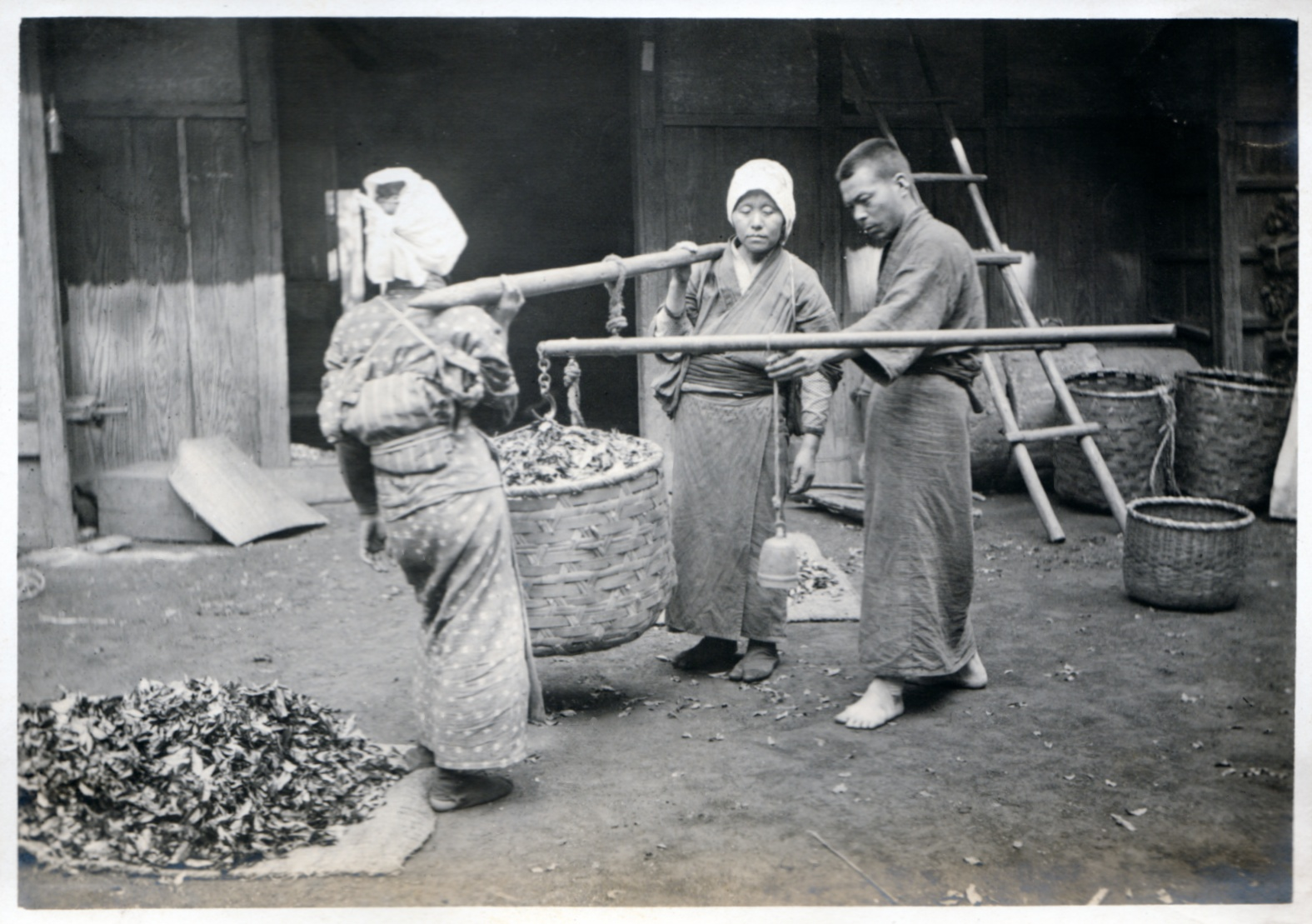
Farmworkers wearing outdoor tabi, 1912

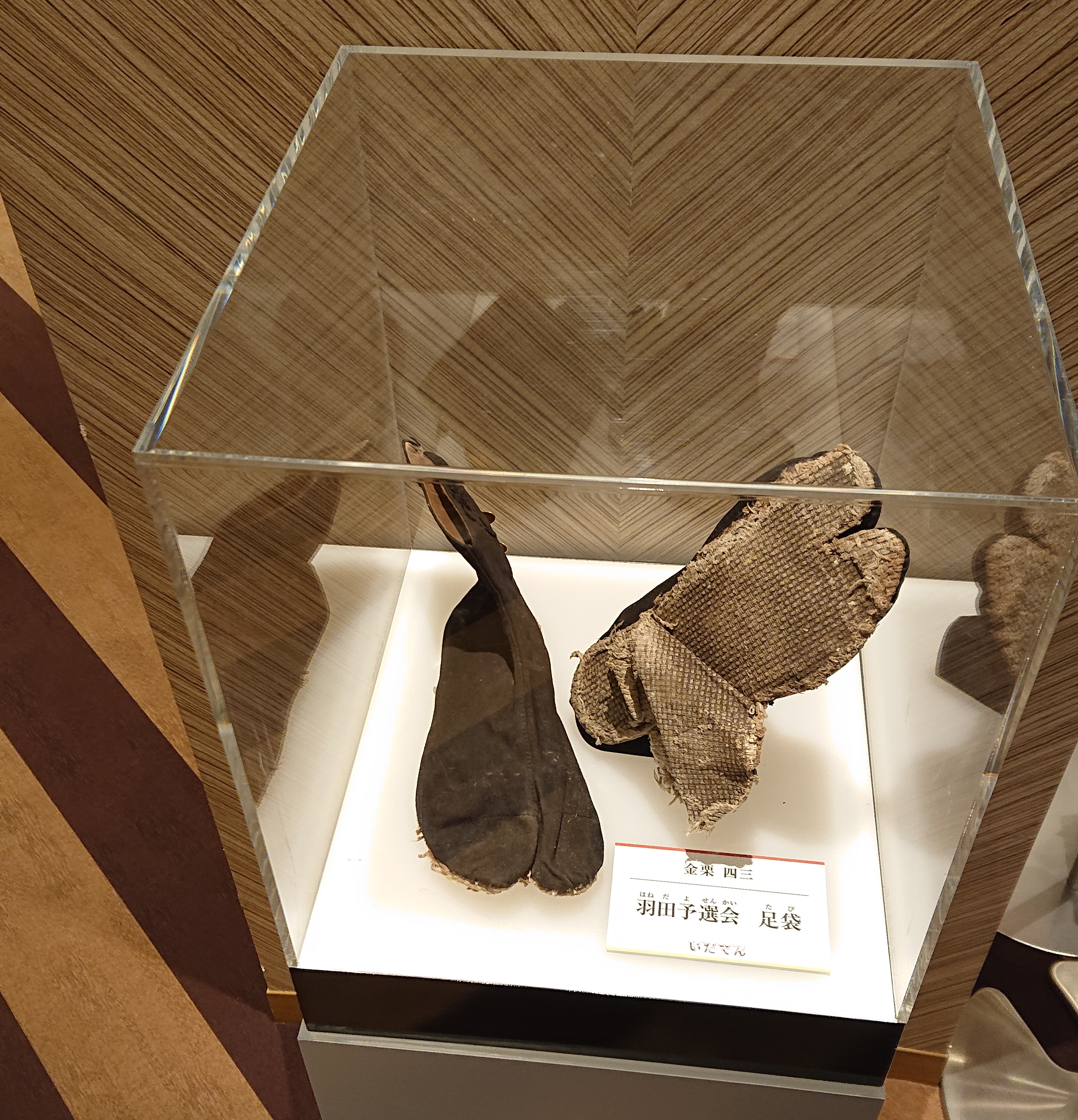
Early 20th century cloth-soled tabi boots (reconstruction of 1912 marathon tabi)

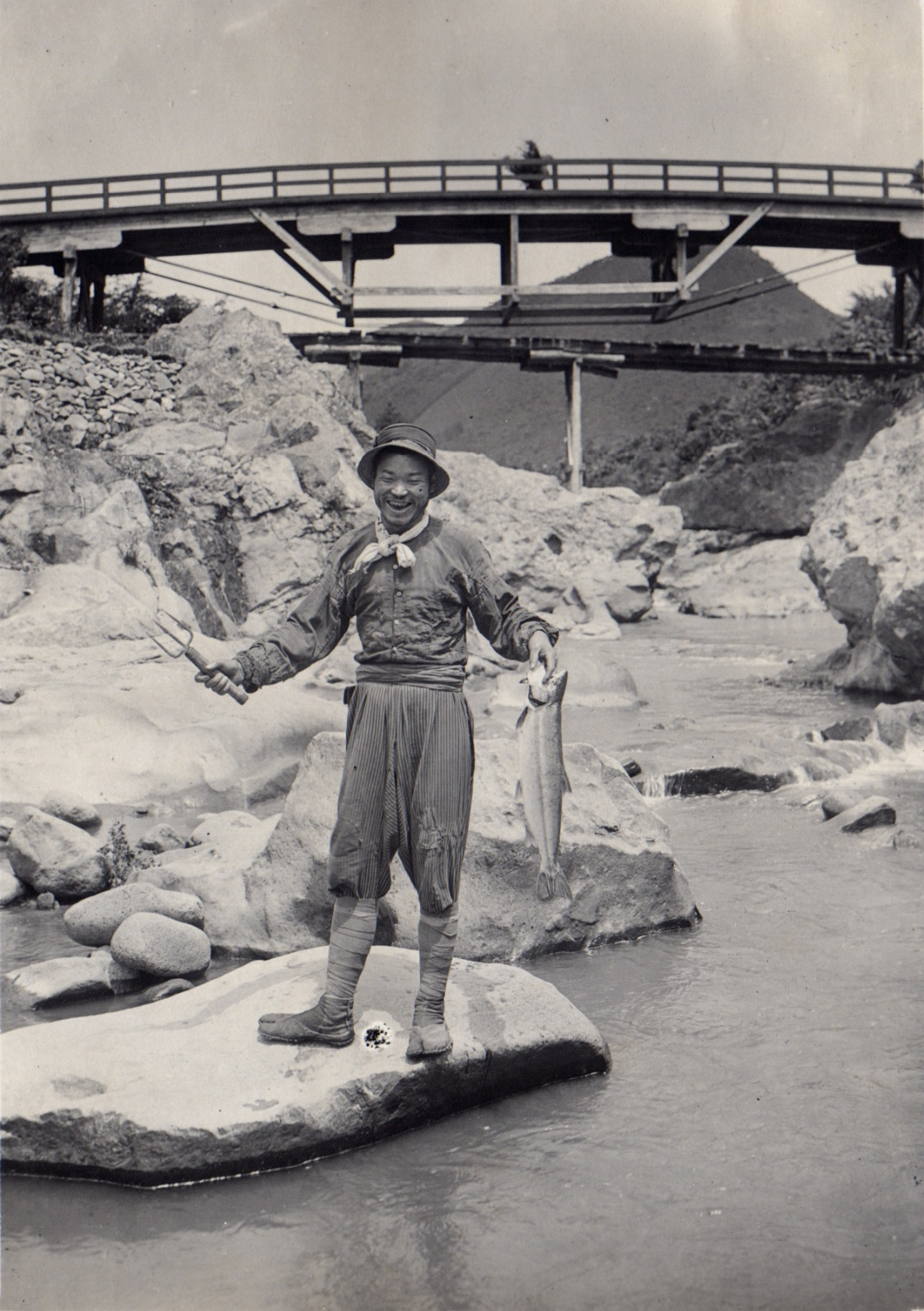
A fisherman wearing tabi with sewn-on woven-straw soles, 1915

Japanese tabi are usually understood today to be a kind of split-toed sock that is not meant to be worn alone outdoors, much like regular socks. However, tabi were originally a kind of leather shoe made from a single animal hide, as evidenced by historical usage and the earlier form of the word, tanbi, spelled 単皮, with the kanji literally signifying "single hide". As Japanese footwear evolved, tabi also changed, with the split-toe design emerging towards the late Heian period to allow the wearer to accommodate the thong of waraji straw sandals to reinforce the sole. Outdoor versions of tabi involved some kind of reinforcement, as seen in the historical photographs above, with soles traditionally made of cloth, leather, or straw.

Brothers Tokujirō Ishibashi and Shōjirō Ishibashi, founders of the tyre company Bridgestone, are credited with the invention of rubber-soled jika-tabi in 1922.

During the 1942 Battle of Milne Bay in Papua (now part of Papua New Guinea), the Allies of World War II faced the Japanese Kaigun Tokubetsu Rikusentai (Special Naval Landing Forces), who wore jika-tabi as part of their uniform. The distinctive tread marks left by the boots allowed Allied troops (mostly Australian troops with some American units) to follow the tracks of Japanese soldiers through the muddy forests. Examples of the boots worn by Japanese soldiers are held by the Australian War Memorial.

The silhouette inspired fashion trends in the 20th century when in 1988, the Margiela tabi was born from Maison Margiela who launched the boots during a runway show

== Use ==
A gardener wearing jika-tabi

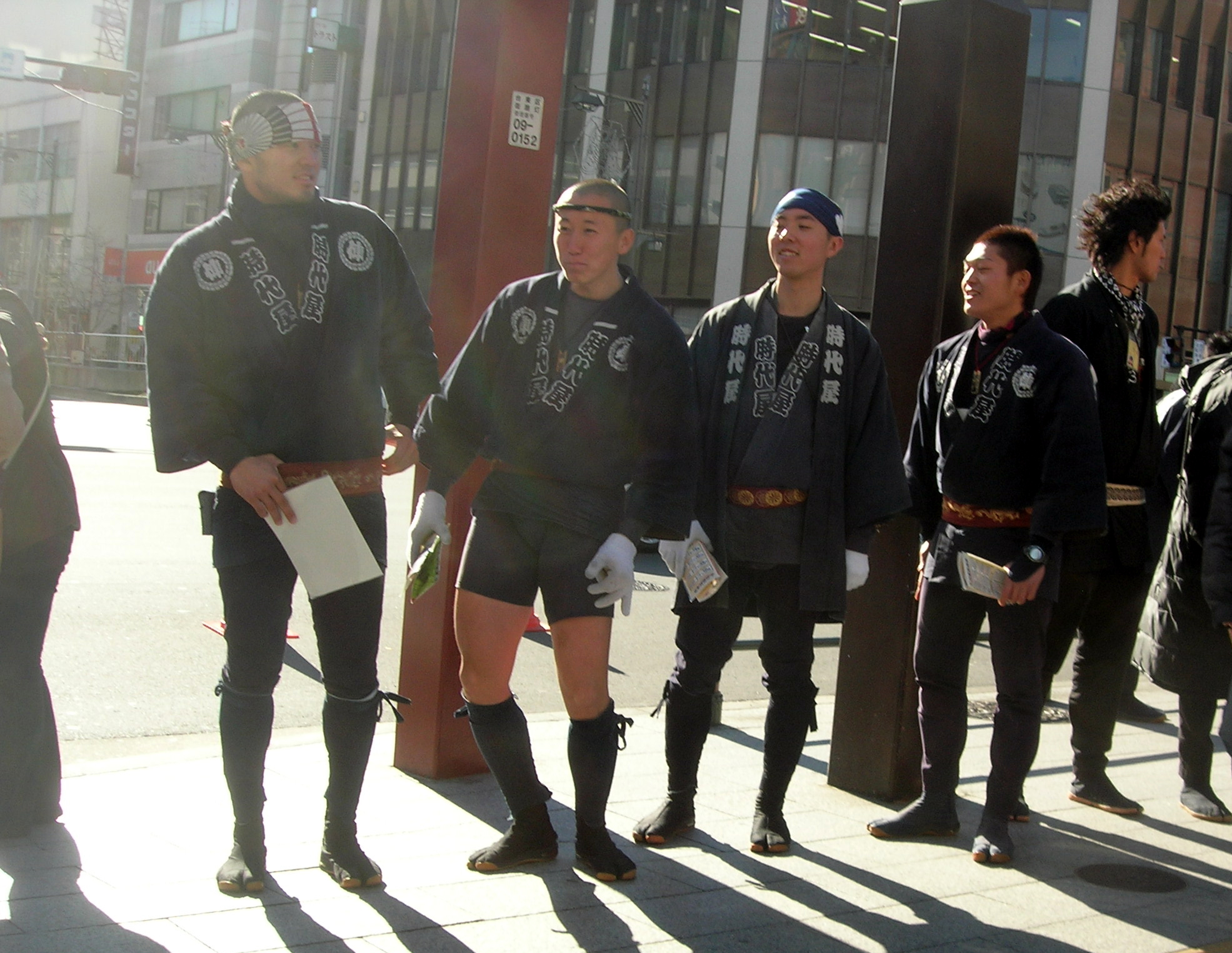
Rickshaw drivers in Tokyo, 2007

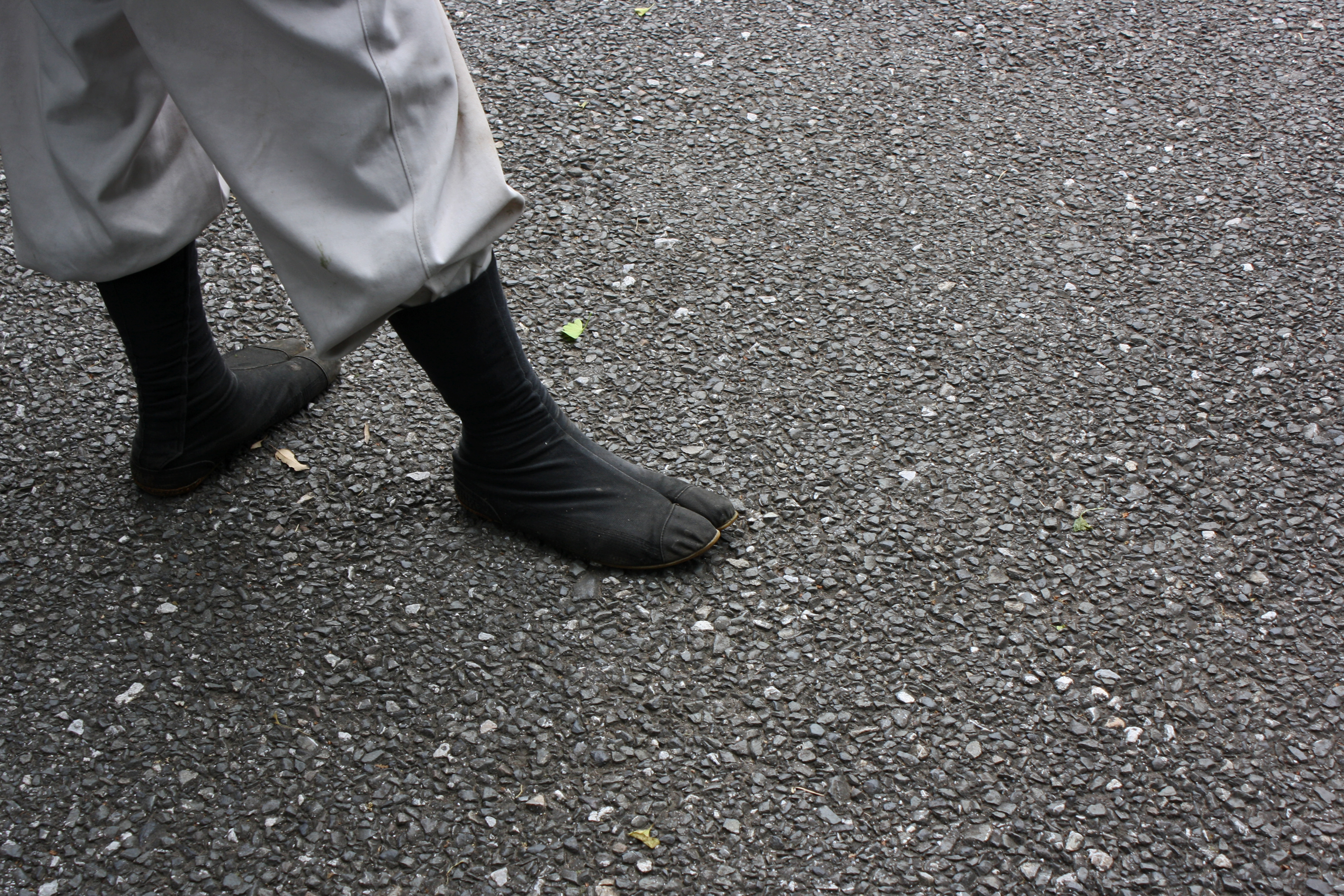
A construction worker wearing jika-tabi and tobi trousers, 2008

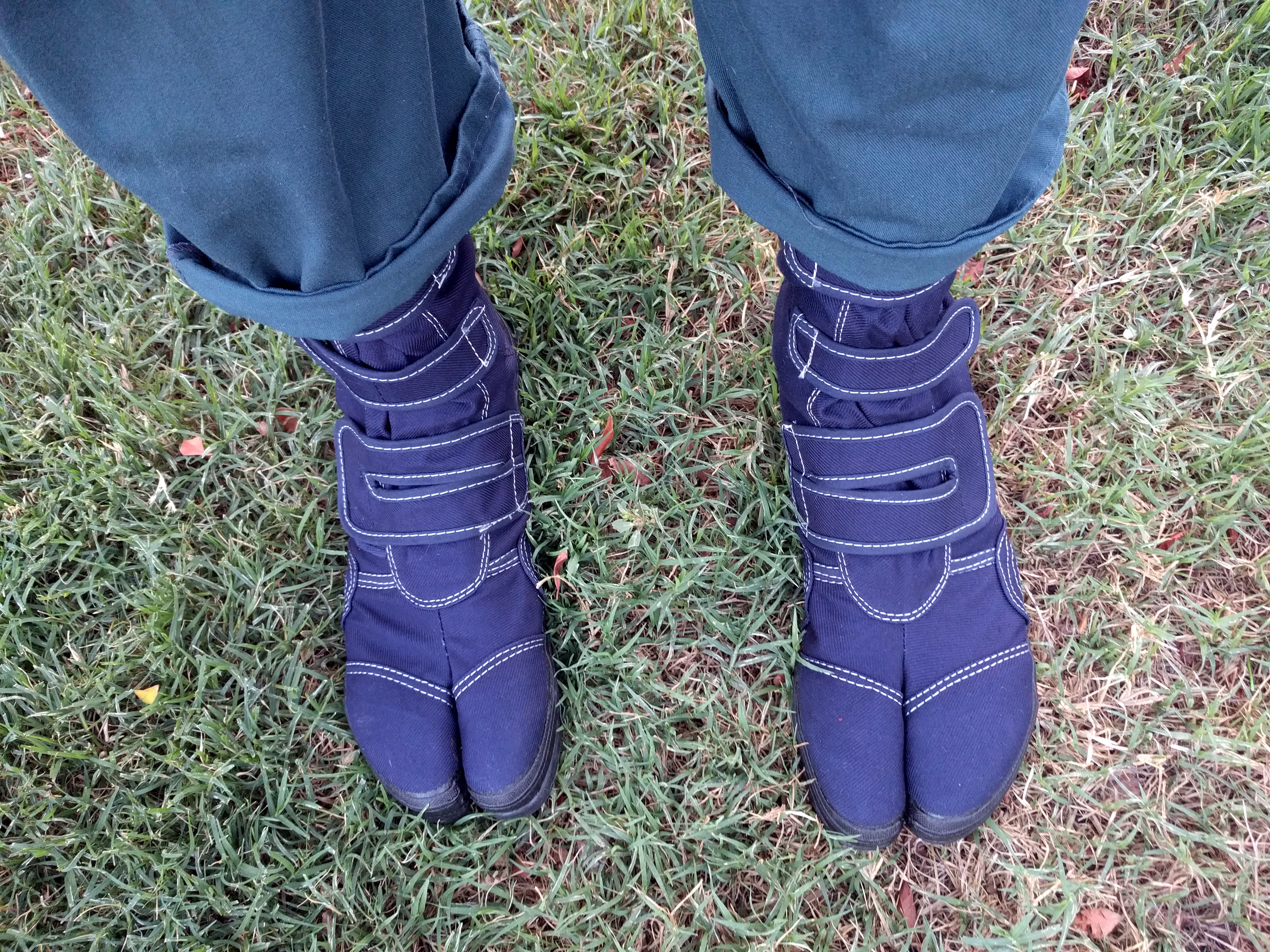
Steel-toed jika-tabi

Jika-tabi are known as footwear commonly used by construction workers, farmers, gardeners, rickshaw-pullers and other labourers, due to the tough material and heavy-duty but flexible rubber soles they are made from.

Though they have faced competition by the introduction of steel-toe workboots in some industries, jika tabi are still preferred by some due to the flexibility of the soles allowing the wearer a greater degree of grip than rigid-soled shoes allow. Other varieties of jika-tabi have been developed for specific labouring purposes, such as knee-high jika-tabi made entirely of rubber used by workers in rice fields and other wet and muddy environments.

In recent years, some jika-tabi manufacturers have introduced steel-toe and hard resin varieties of jika-tabi, which have been approved by the Japan Occupational Safety and Health Resource Center. These have some precedents in traditional kōgake (tabi with chainmail or plate armour).

Outside Japan, jika-tabi are available from online and martial-arts shops, and are used by practitioners of the martial art of Bujinkan budo taijutsu, especially when training outdoors. Jika-tabi are also commonly worn for certain kinds of exercise, specifically cross country running, walking, and climbing.

Though typically worn for manual labour and exercise, jika-tabi are also worn for comfort and as a casual shoe. A variation of jika-tabi known as matsuri tabi is so called due to commonly being worn for festivals; this variety features extra cushioning in the sole for comfort.

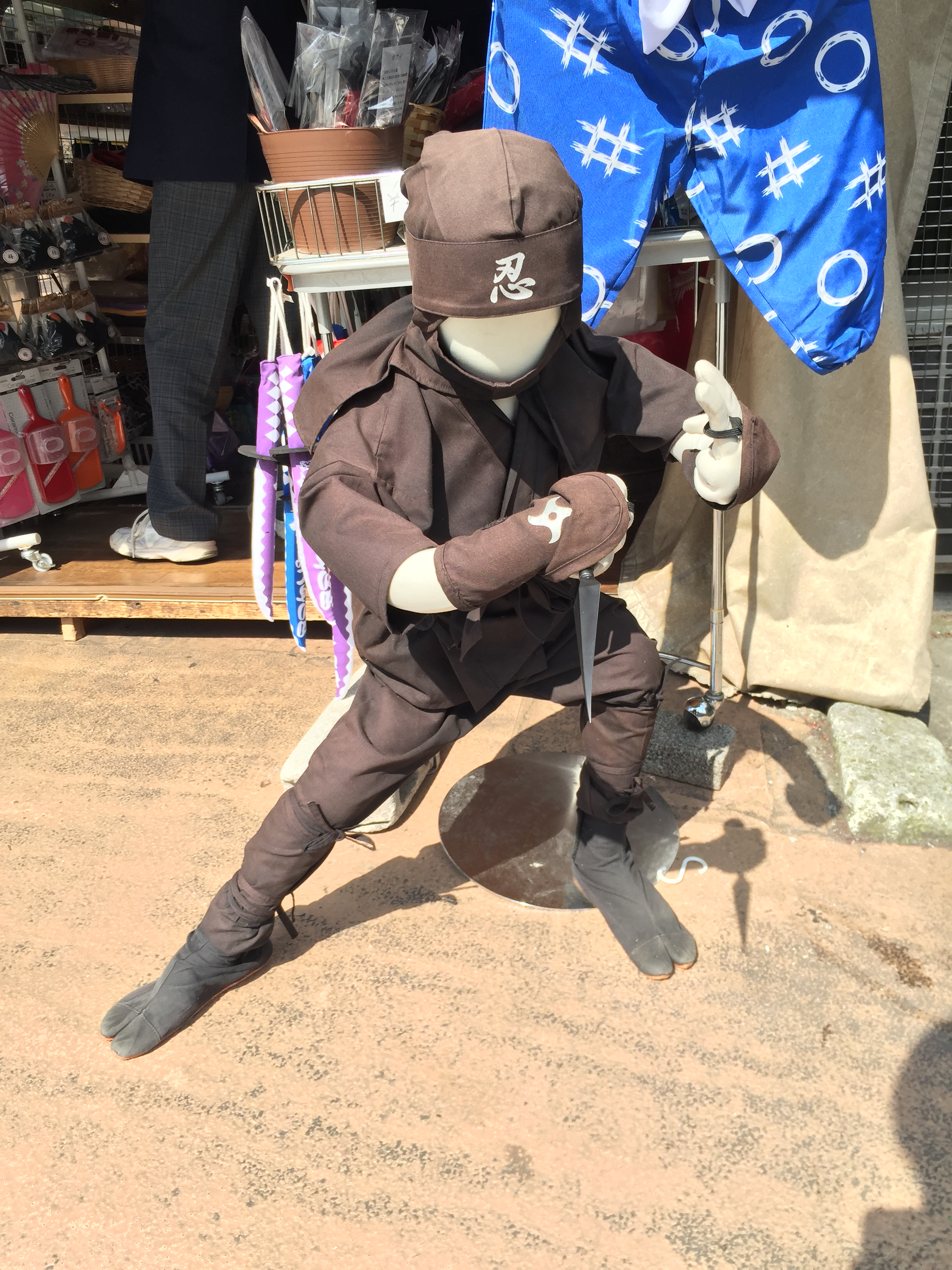
Mannequin in ninja costume wearing jika-tabi

== See also ==
- List of shoe styles
- Tabi
- Waraji
