= Tobi trousers =

Style of Japanese trousers designed to be worn with split-toed boots

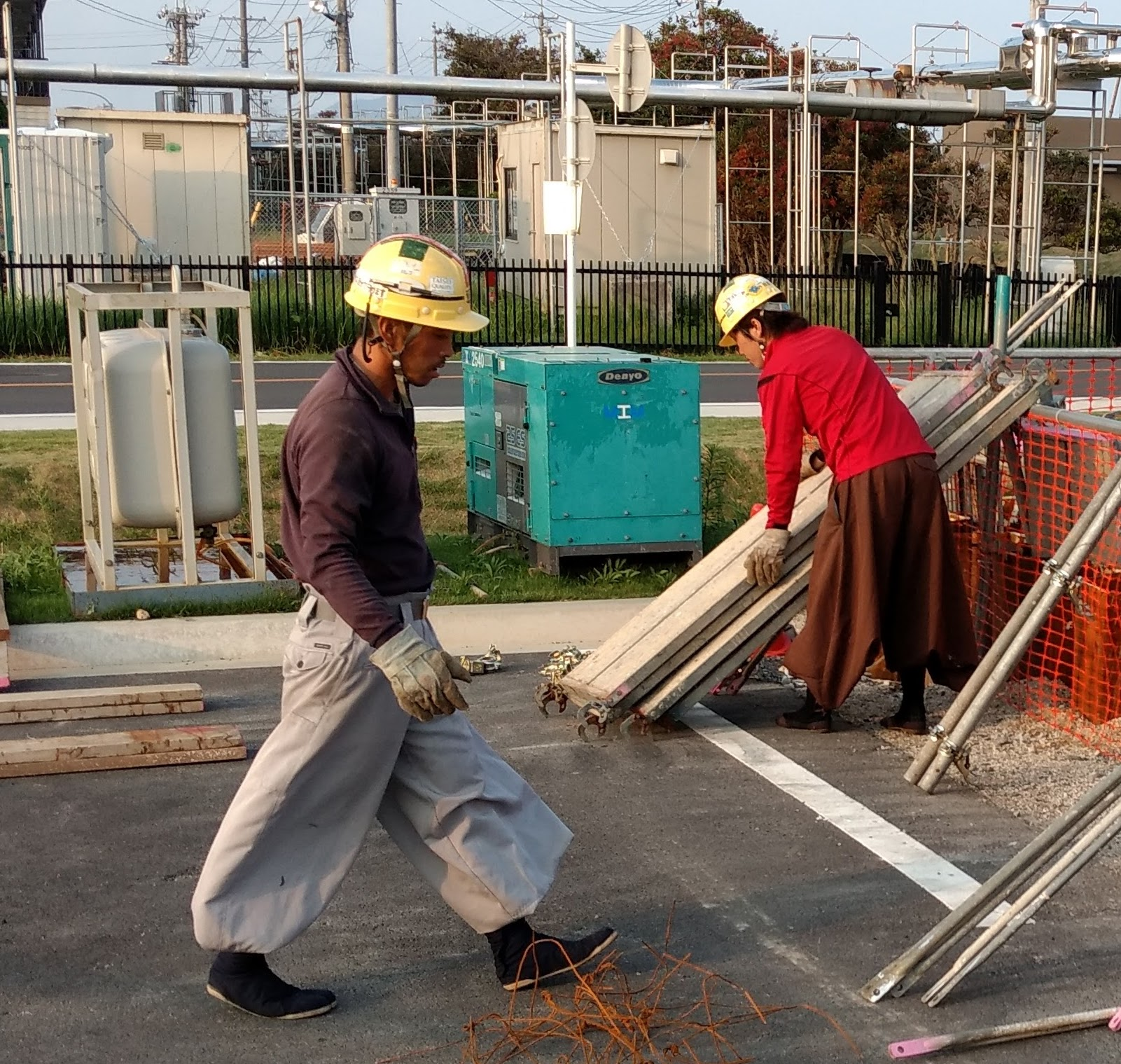
Two workers wearing tobi pants and jika-tabi boots

Tobi trousers or tobi pants (Japanese: 鳶ズボン) are a type of baggy pants used as a common uniform of tobi shokunin (鳶職(とびしょく)), construction workers in Japan who work on high places (such as scaffolding and skyscrapers). The pants are baggy to a point below the knees, abruptly narrowing at the calves so as to be put into the footwear: high boots or jika-tabi (tabi-style boots).

According to a spokesperson for Toraichi, a major manufacturer of worker's clothes of this style, the style was developed from knickerbockers which were part of Japanese military uniform during World War II. The regular knickerbocker-style pants are called "nikka zubon" ("zubon" meaning "trousers" and "nikka" or "nikka-bokka", a gairaigo transformation of the word "knickerbockers"). The excessively widened ones are called chocho zubon. This style has also entered popular fashion, as evidenced by the emergence of toramani ("Toraichi maniacs"), die-hard fans of Toraichi trousers.
