= Auxiliary armour (Japan) =

Japanese samurai armour

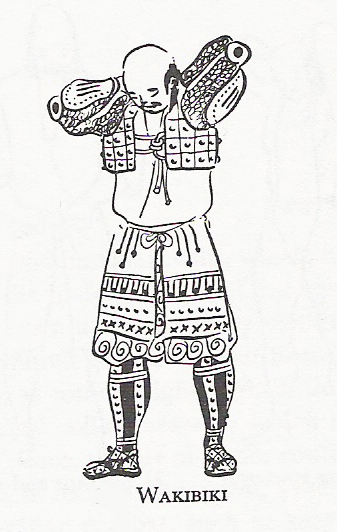
Edo period print of a samurai putting on a wakibiki.

Auxiliary armour in a set of Japanese armour are optional pieces worn by the samurai class of feudal Japan in addition to the traditional six armour components.

== Description ==
The six major articles or components of Japanese armour (hei-no-rokugu, roku gu, or roku gusoku) are the dou or dō (chest armour), kabuto (helmet), mengu (facial armour), kote (armoured sleeves), sune-ate (shin armour), and the hai-date (thigh armour). Additional armour protection was available for the neck, armpit, chest, waist and feet. These auxiliary armours covered areas of the body that were exposed by gaps in the regular armour items or where additional protection was required.

=== Wakibiki ===
Wakibiki are simple rectangles of cloth covered with kusari (chain armor), karuta (small rectangular or square plates), or kikko (hexagon plates). These iron or leather armours or a combination of them were sewn to the cloth backing. Wakibiki could also be made from one solid piece of iron or hardened leather. The wakibiki had cords connected to them which allowed the wakibiki to hang from the shoulder, the wakibiki was then suspended over the exposed arm pit area. Wakibiki were worn inside of the chest armour dou (dō) or on the outside depending on the type.

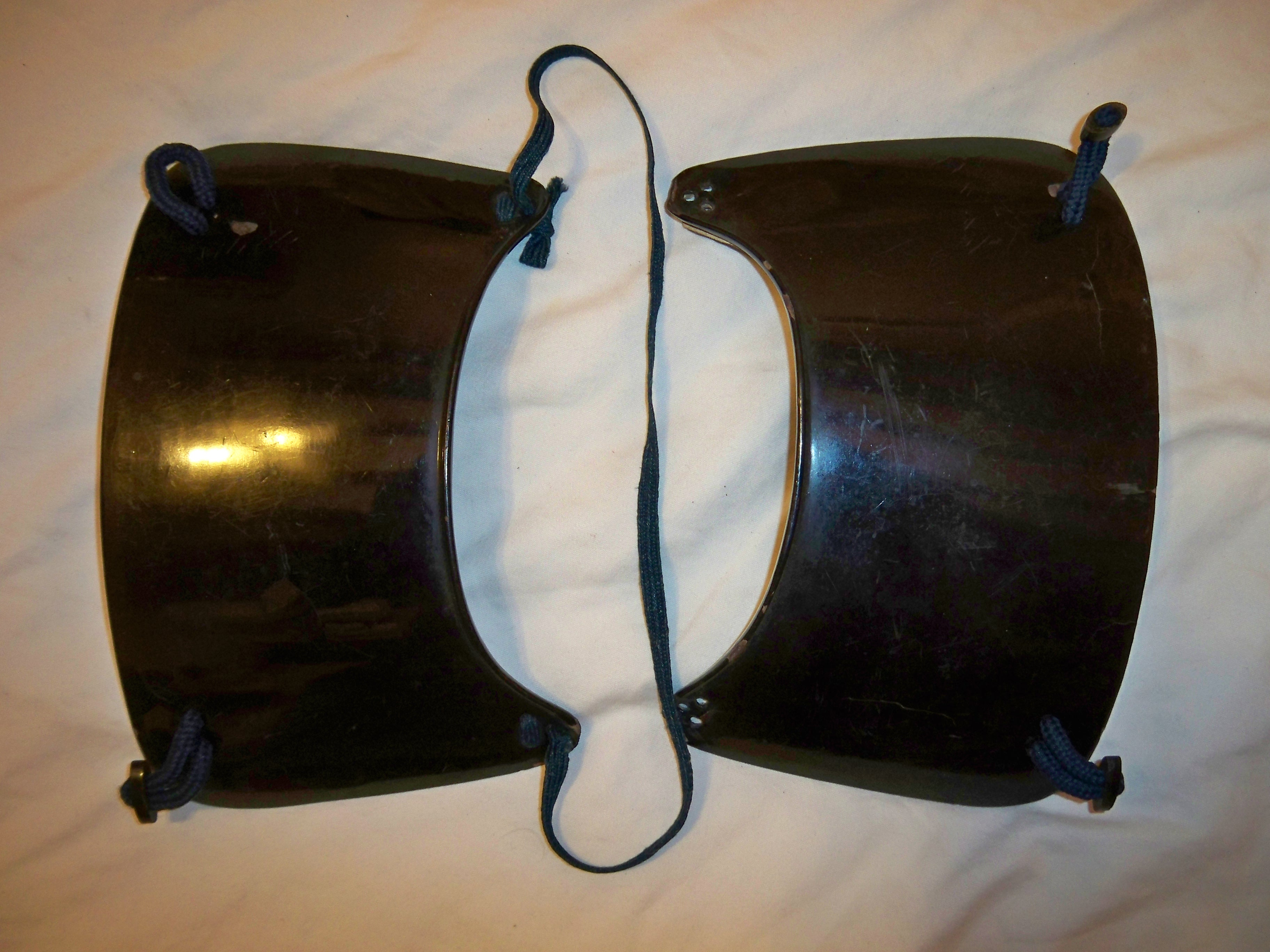
A pair of antique Japanese (samurai) tetsu (iron) wakibiki (armpit protectors).

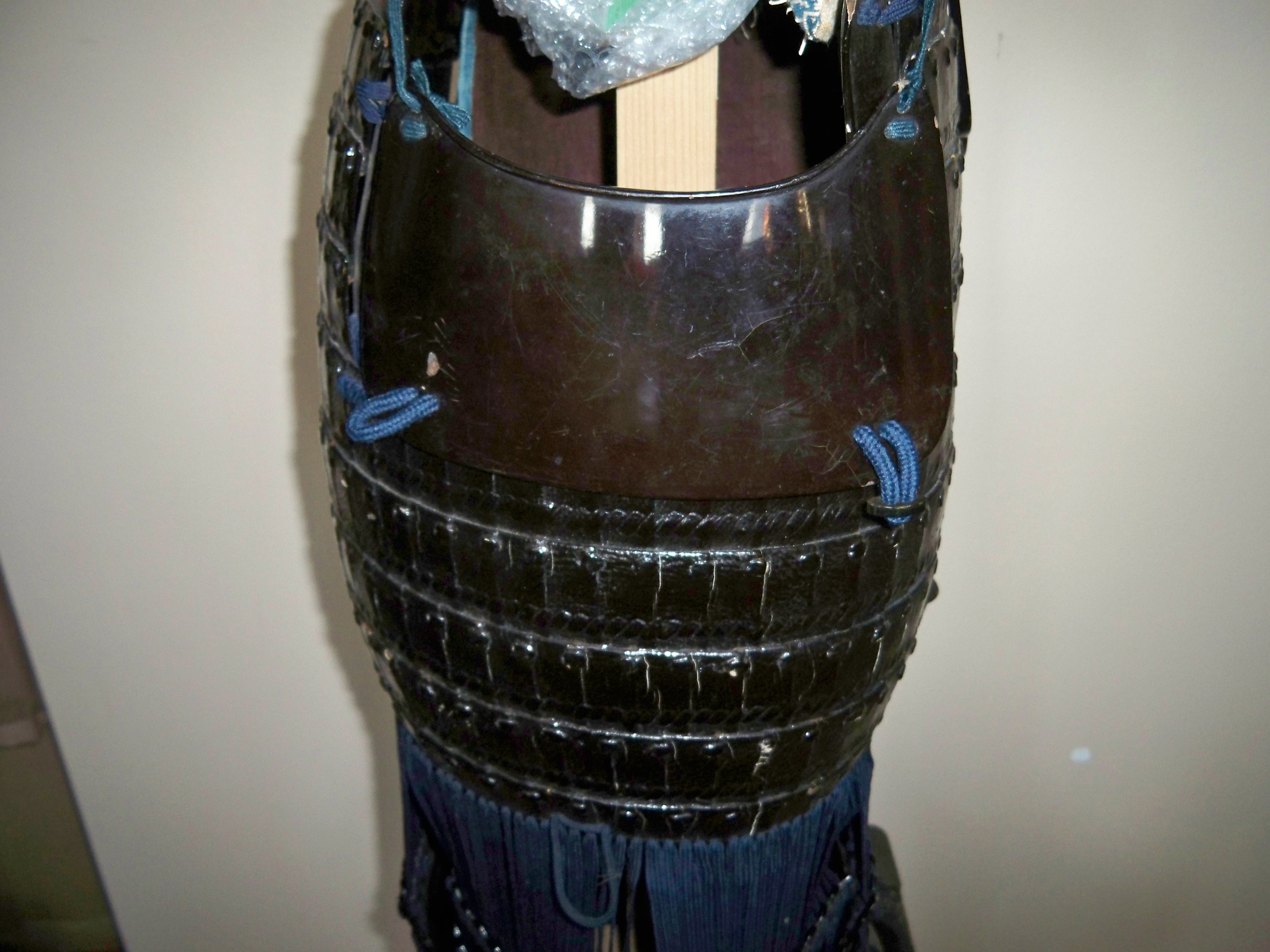
A tetsu (iron) wakibiki installed on a hon iyozane dou.

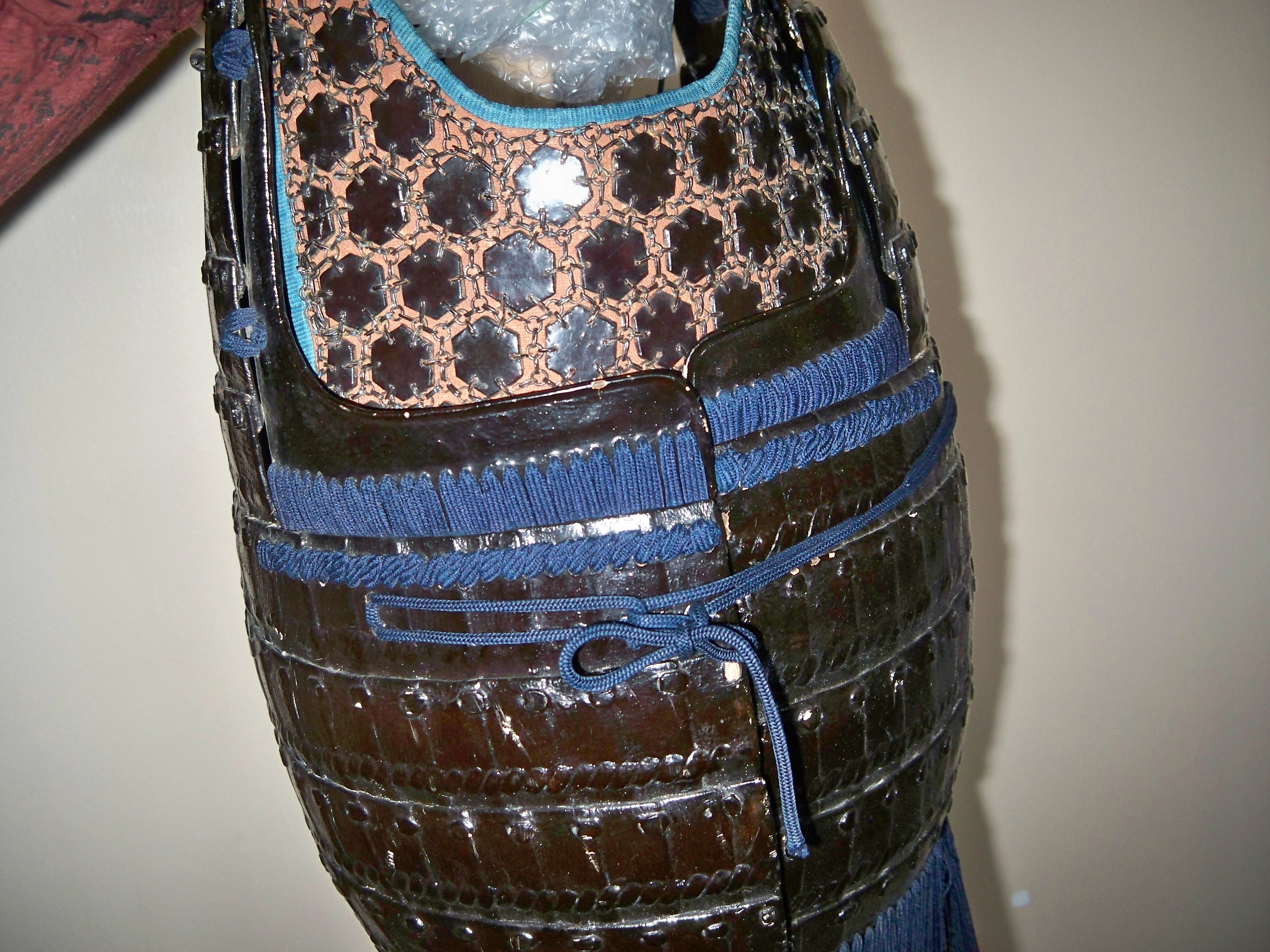
A kikko wakibiki installed on a hon iyozane dou.

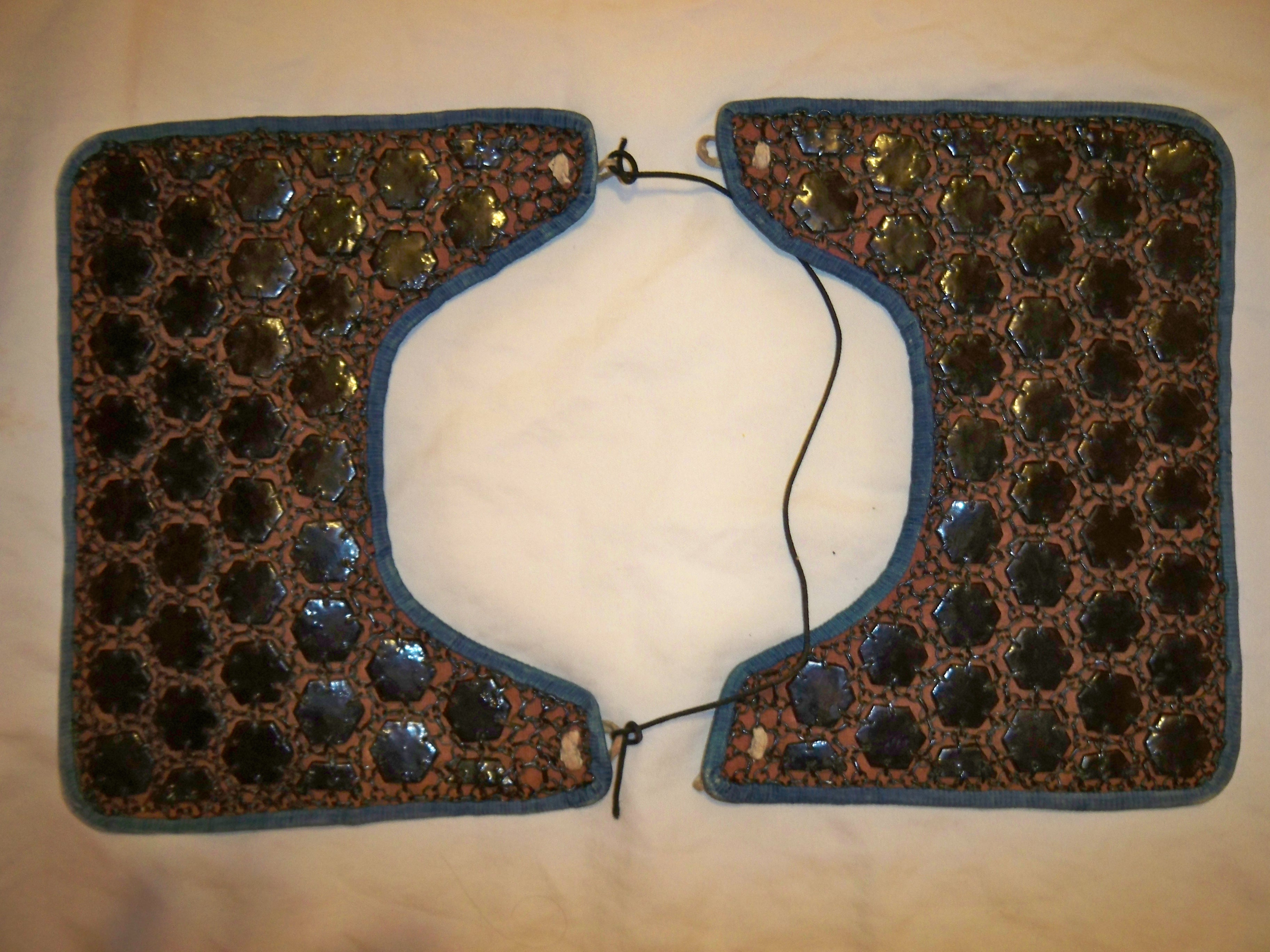
A pair of antique Japanese (samurai) Edo period kikko wakibiki.

=== Manju no wa ===
Manju no wa, ( also manjunowa or manju nowa ) are a combination of shoulder pads, collar and armpit guards in one that protected the upper chest area. Manju no wa were covered with different types of armour including kusari (chain armour), karuta (small square or rectangular armour plates), or kikko (hexagon plates), these iron or leather armours or a combination of them were sewn to a cloth backing. The armour could be exposed or hidden between a layer of cloth. When worn the manju no wa looked like a small tight fitting vest. Manju no wa have small wings that would pass under the arm pit area from the back and attach to the front of the manju no wa with a button, toggle or ties.

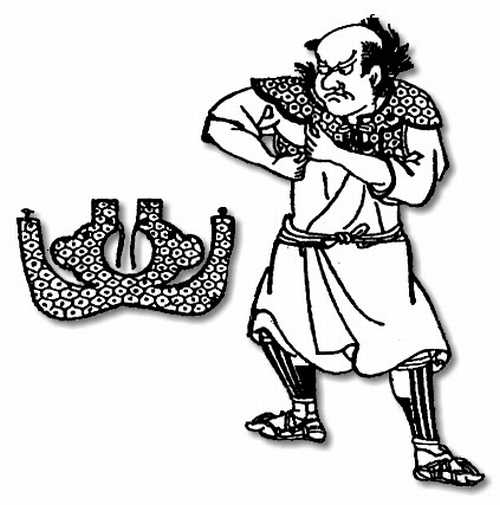
An Edo period print of a samurai putting on a manju no wa.

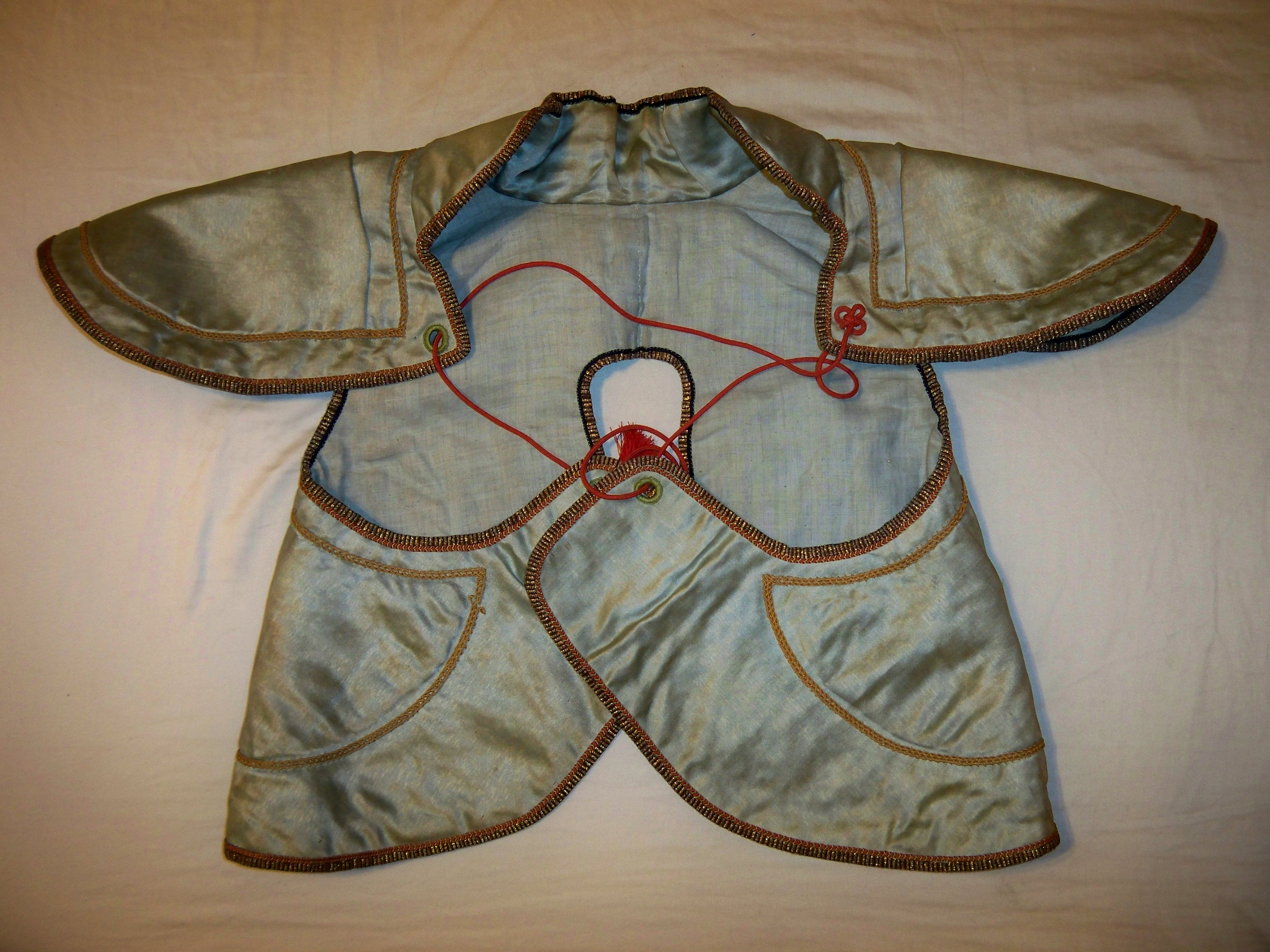
An antique Japanese (samurai) manju no wa. This manju no wa is made with a lining of kusari (chain armour) hidden between an inner and outer layer of cloth.

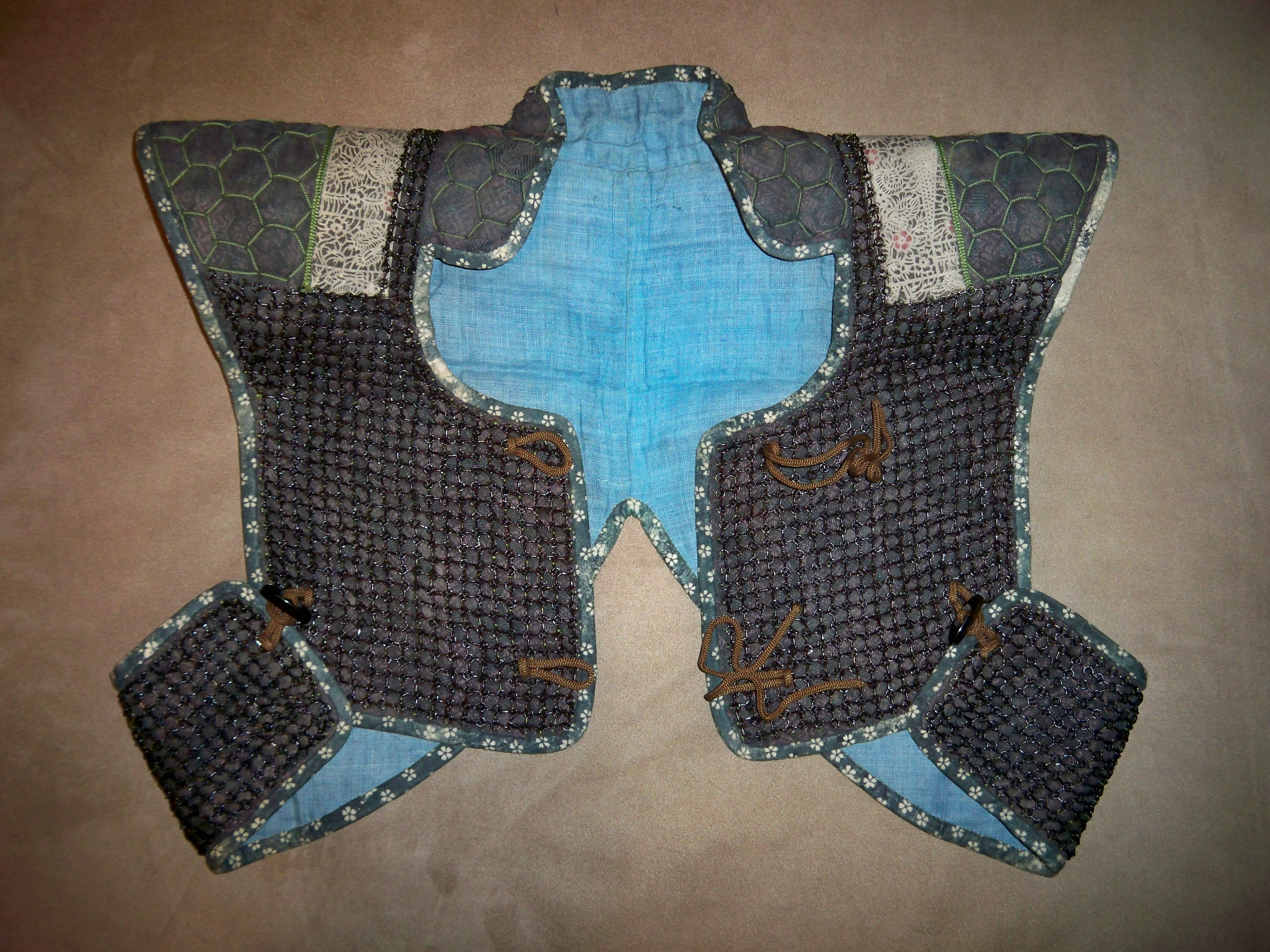
Antique Japanese (samurai) manju no wa. Kusari (chain armour) and kikko (small hexagon armour plates) sewn to cloth.

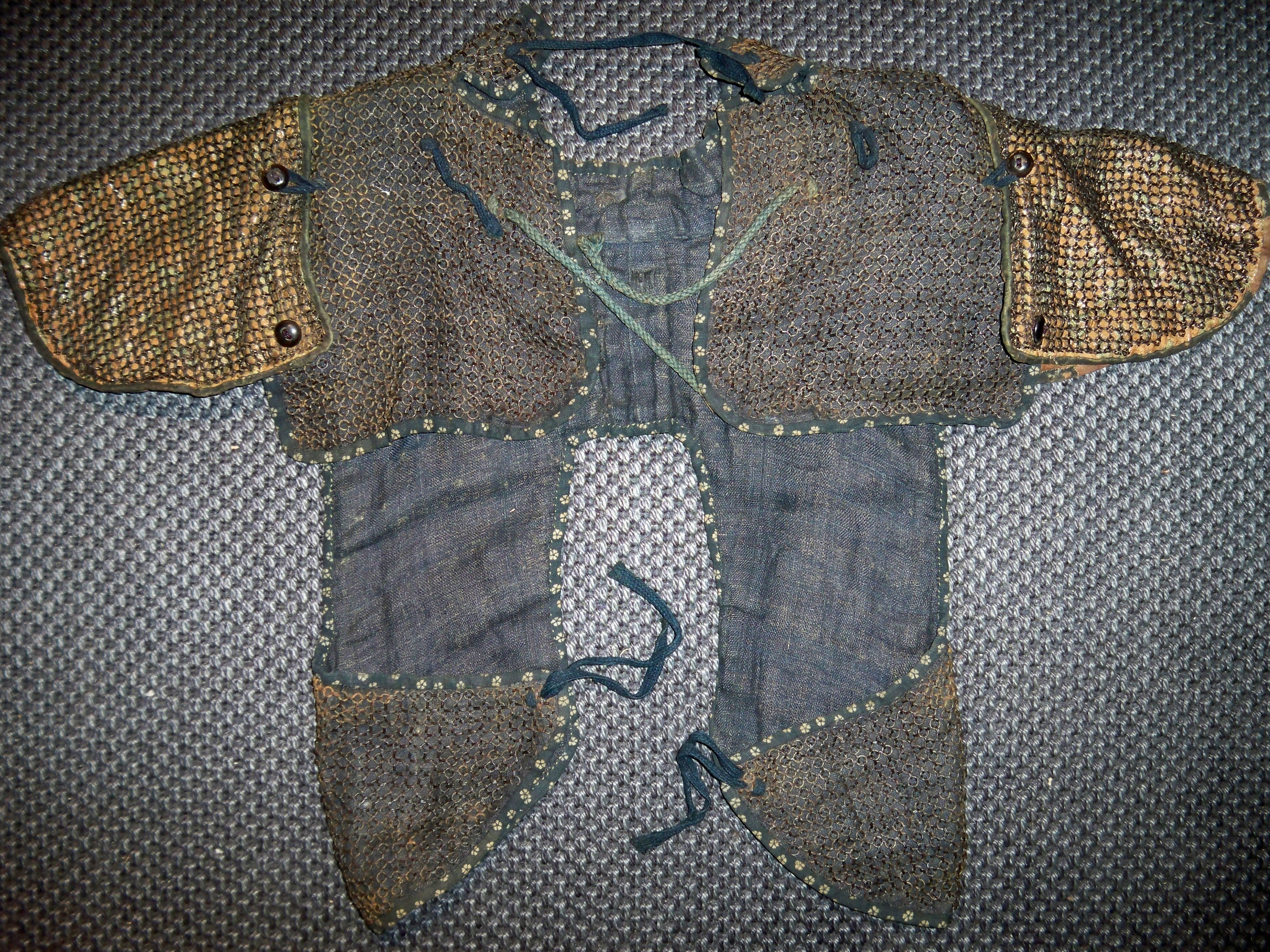
Antique Japanese (samurai) manju-no-wa, made from chain armour kusari sewn to a cloth backing.

=== Manchira ===
Manchira are a type of armoured vest covered with different types of armour including kusari (chain armour), karuta (small square or rectangular armour plates), or kikko (hexagon plates), these iron or leather armours or a combination of them were sewn to a cloth backing. The armour could be exposed or hidden between a layer of cloth. Manchira are usually larger than manju no wa and protected the chest area and sometimes the neck and arm pit. Some manchira could be worn over the chest armour dou (dō) .

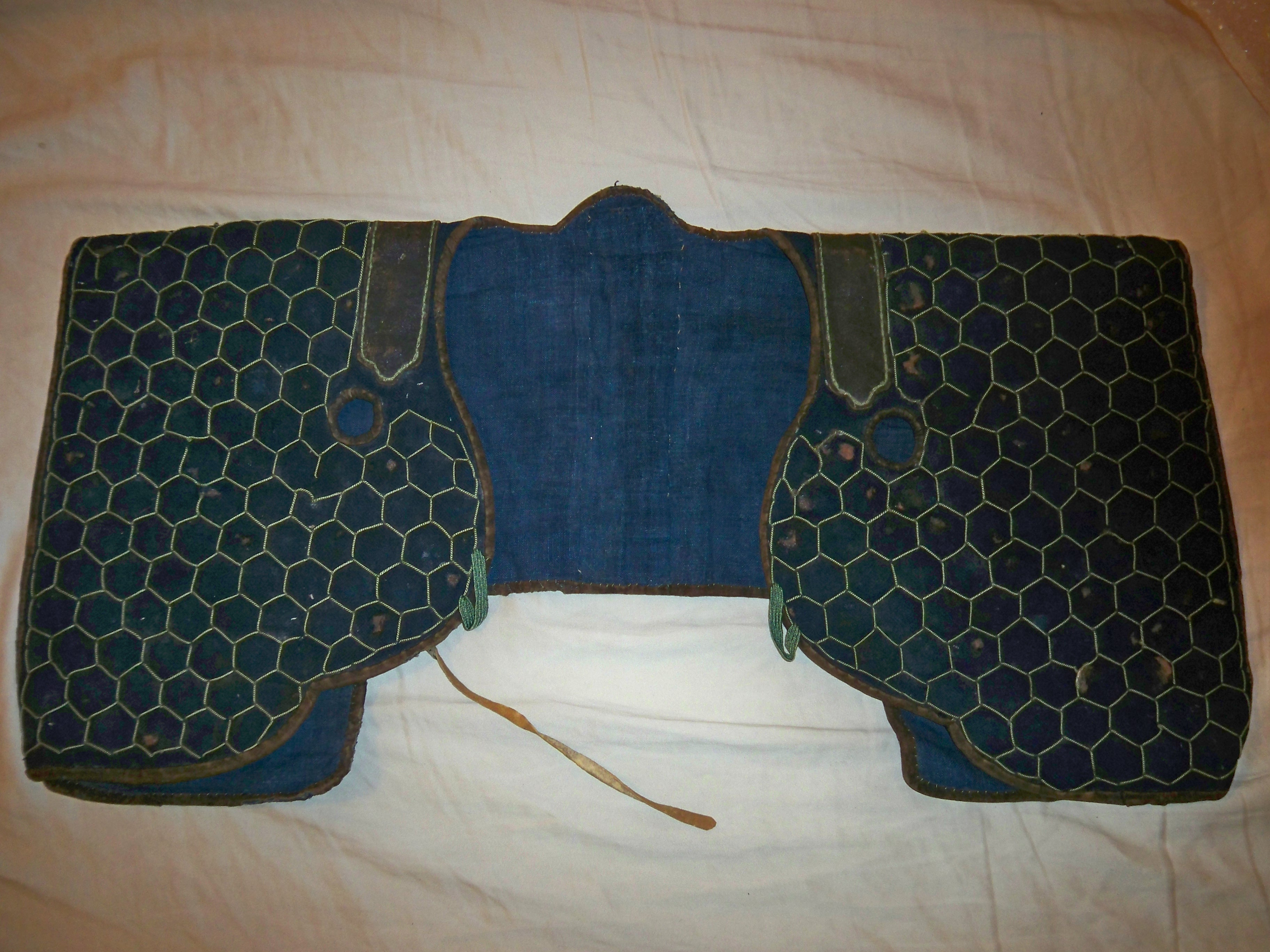
Japanese (samurai) Edo period kikko manchira. an armoured vest "manchira" with small hexagon iron plates "kikko" hidden between layers of cloth.

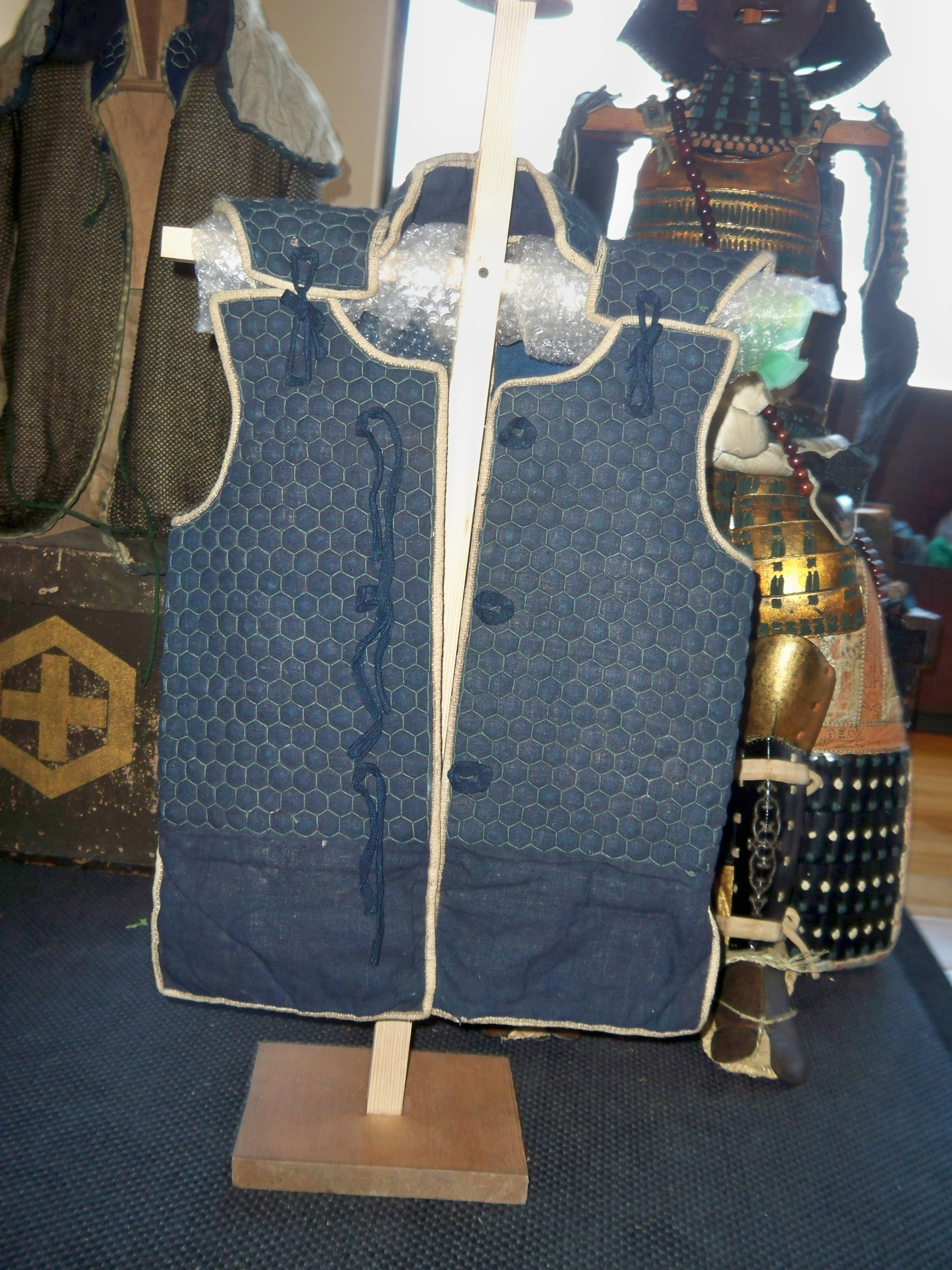
Japanese (samurai) Edo period Japanese (samurai) kikko vest manchira.

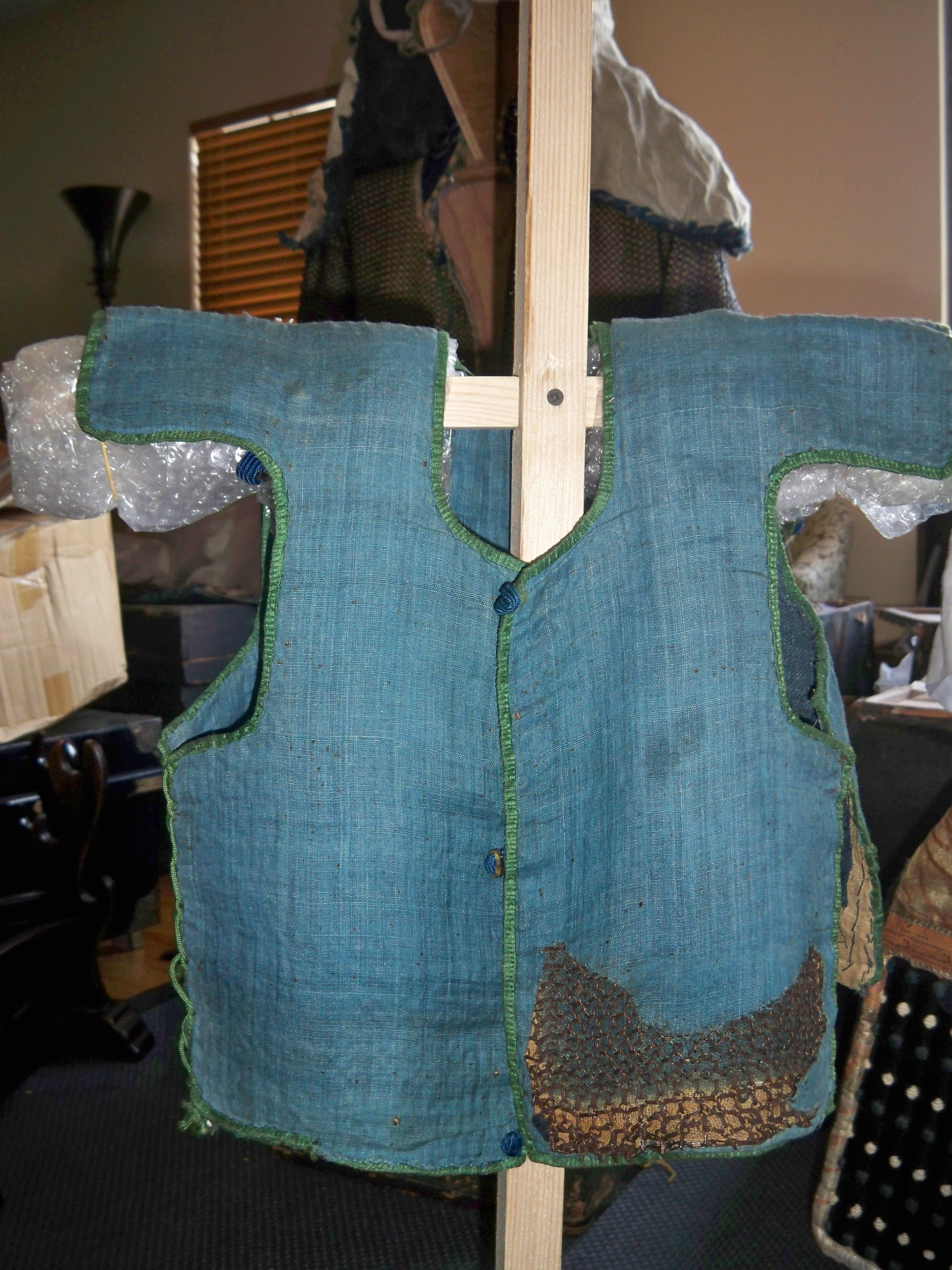
Antique Edo period Japanese (samurai) samurai chain mail vest or manchira. This was worn under traditional armour or clothing as hidden protection.

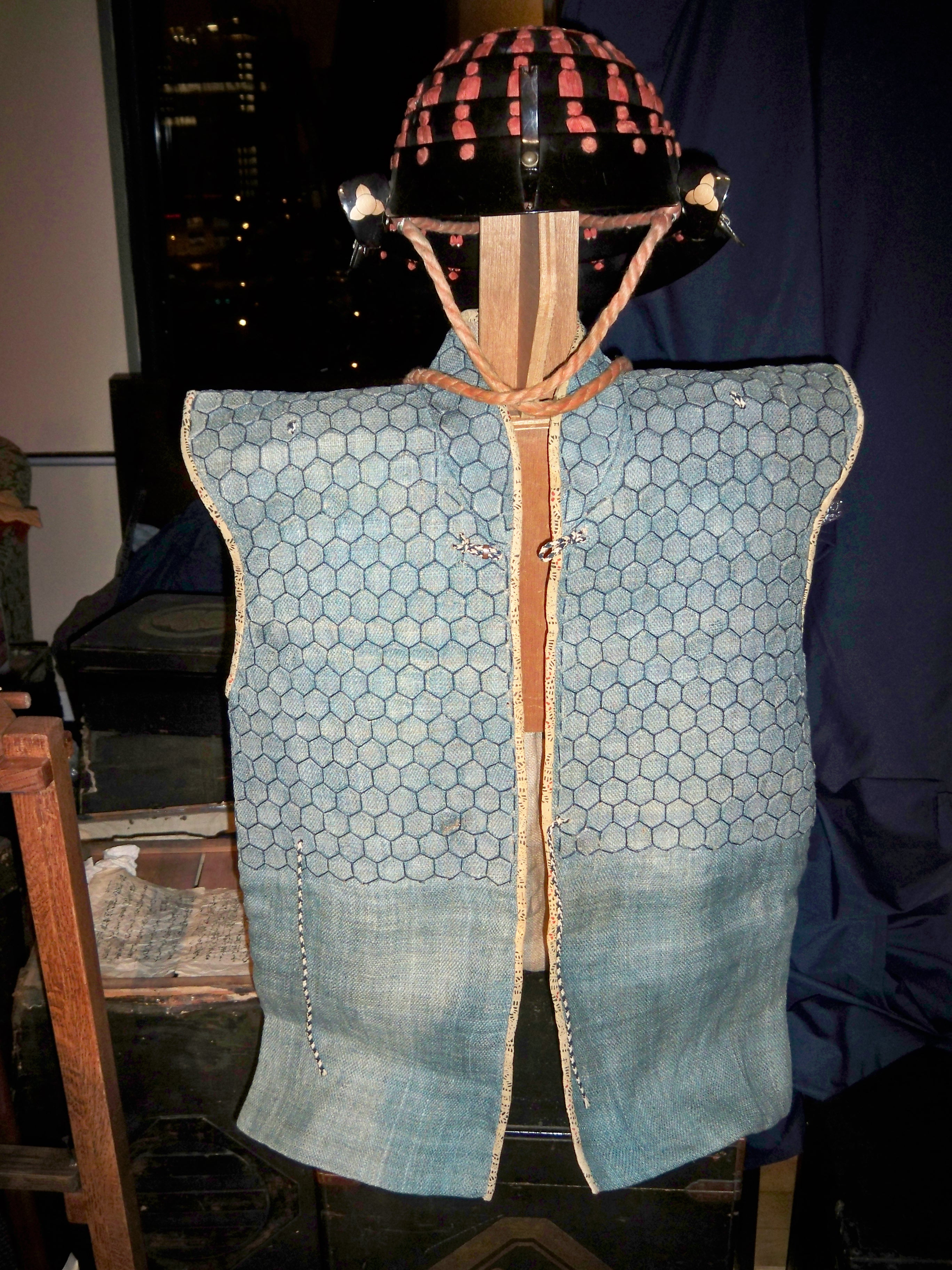
Antique Japanese (samurai) Edo period kikko manchira or a vest made with hexagon armour plates kikko.

=== Tate-eri ===
Tate-eri are small padded pillow like pieces with a standing armoured collar that sits on the shoulder to protect from the weight of the breastplate or cuirass (dō). The standing collar would be lined with kikko (hexagon plates) armour to protect the neck.

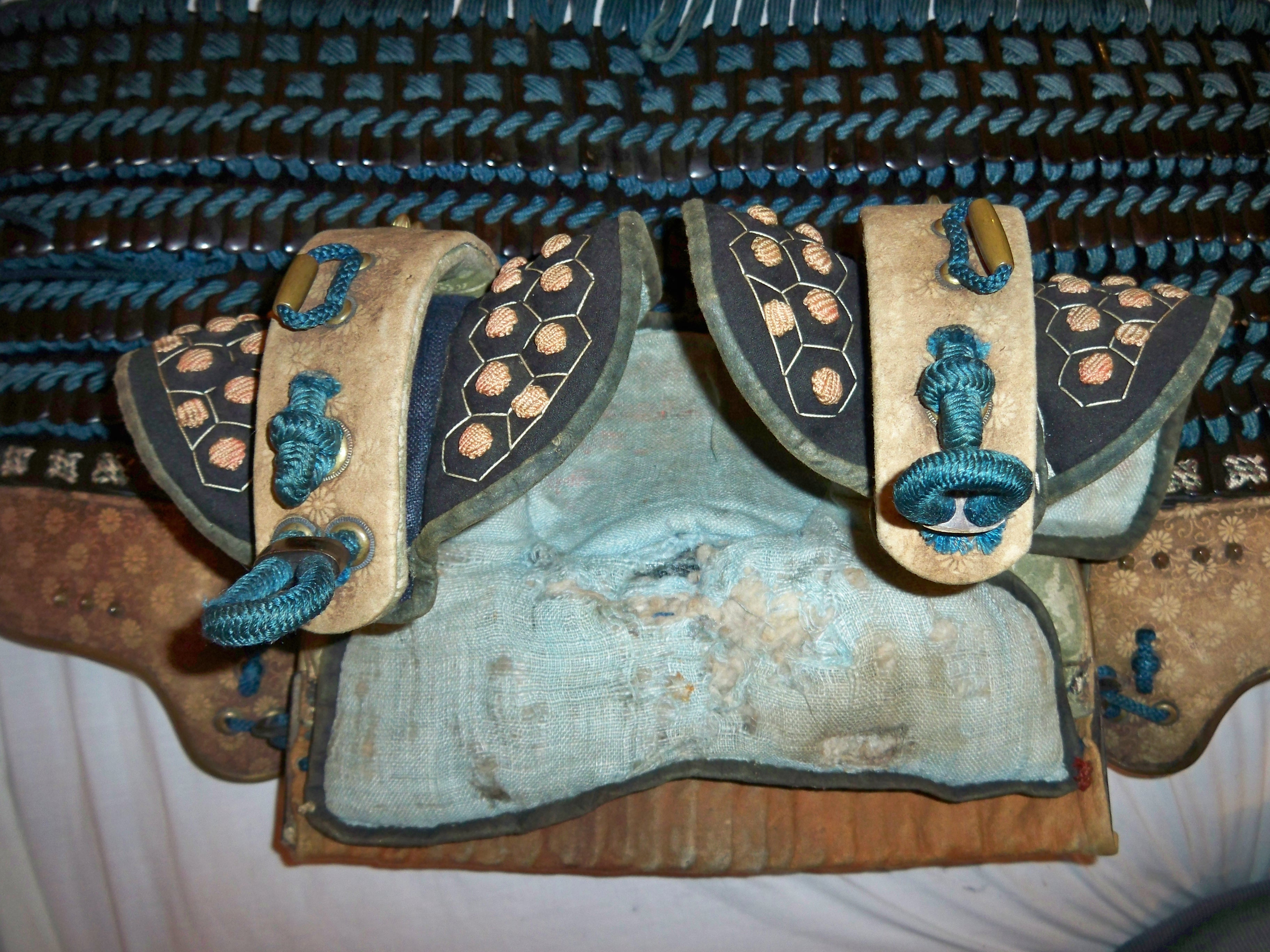
Tare-eri, installed on a breastplate.

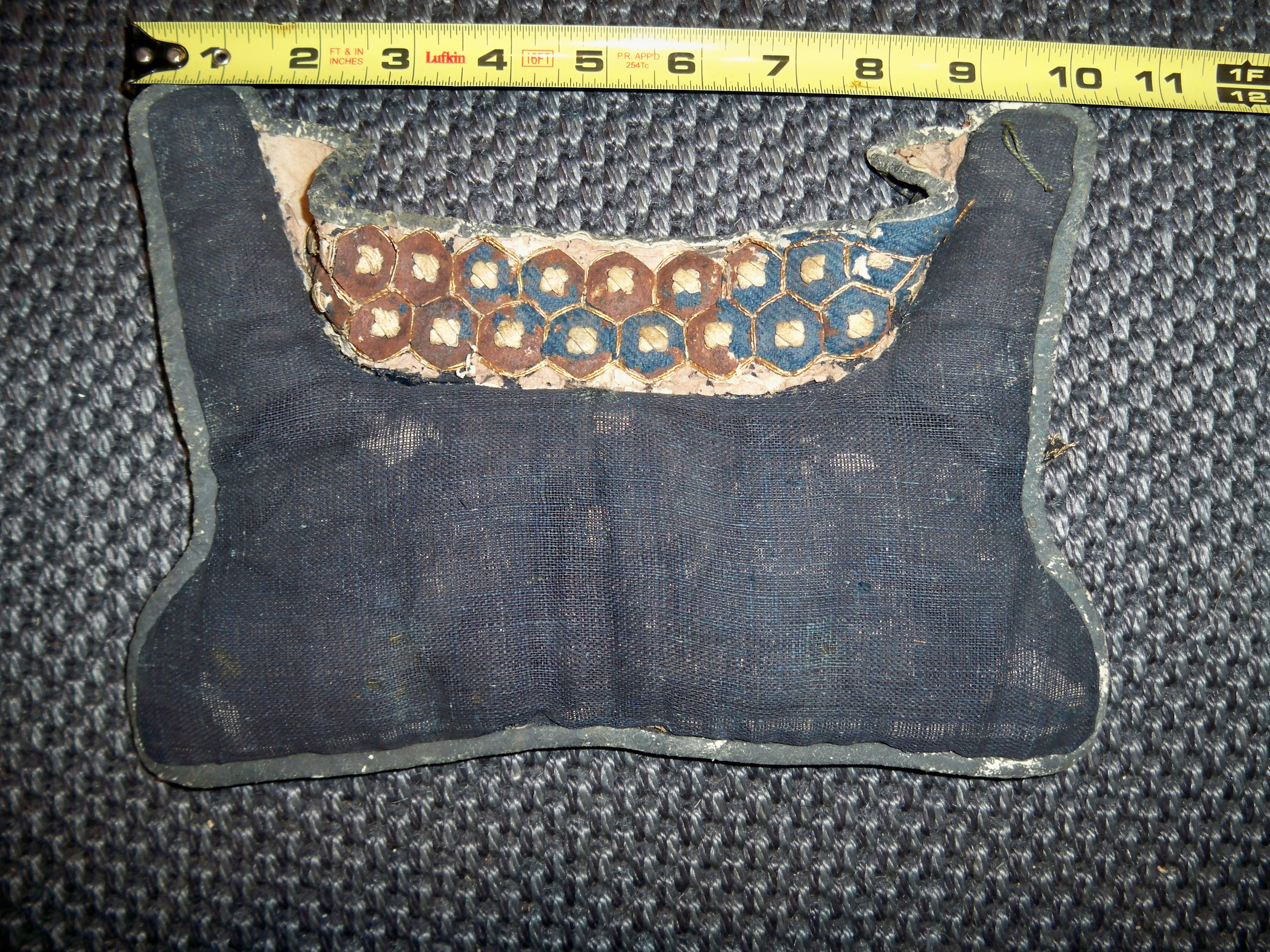
Tare-eri.

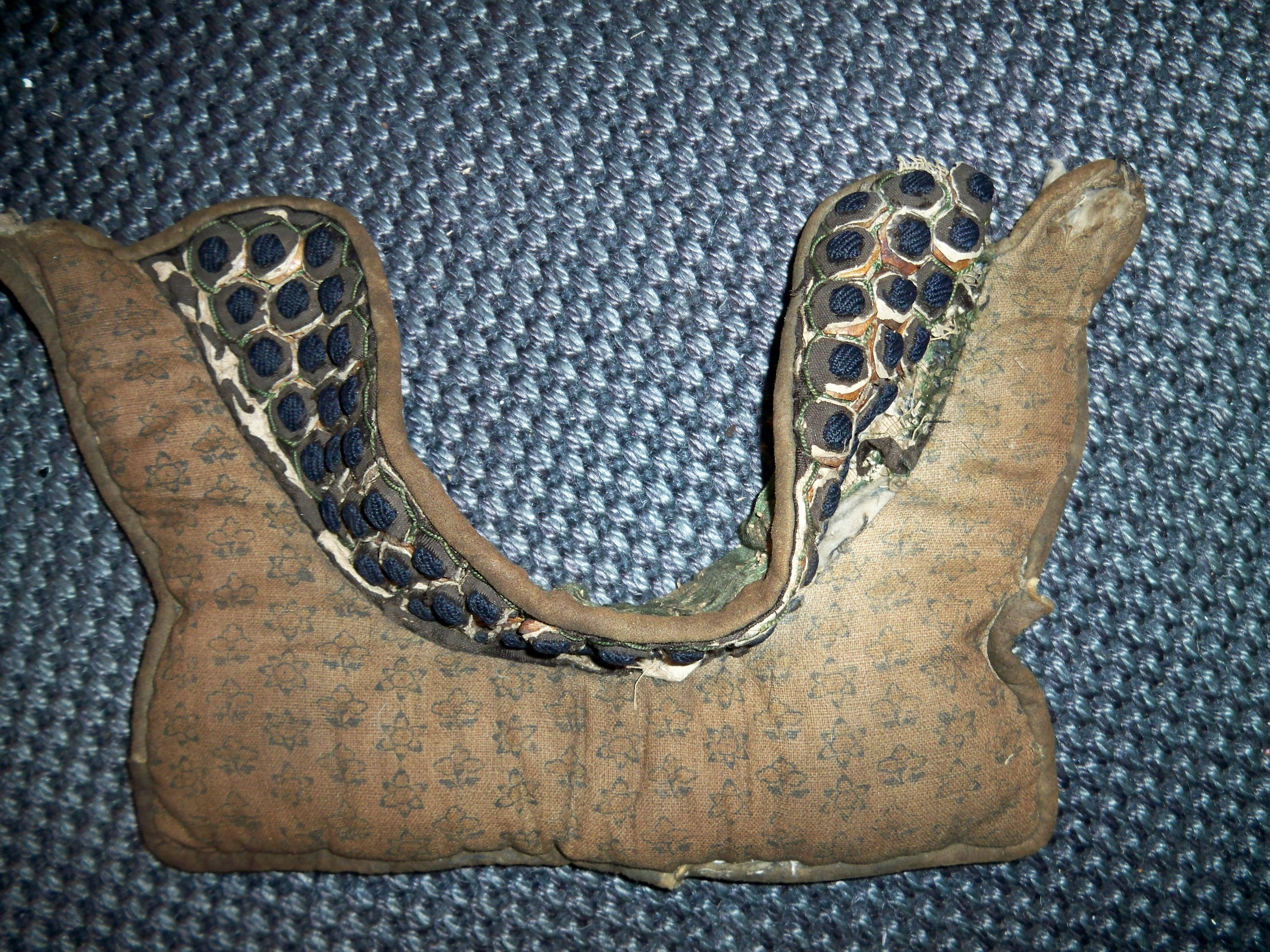
Tate-eri.

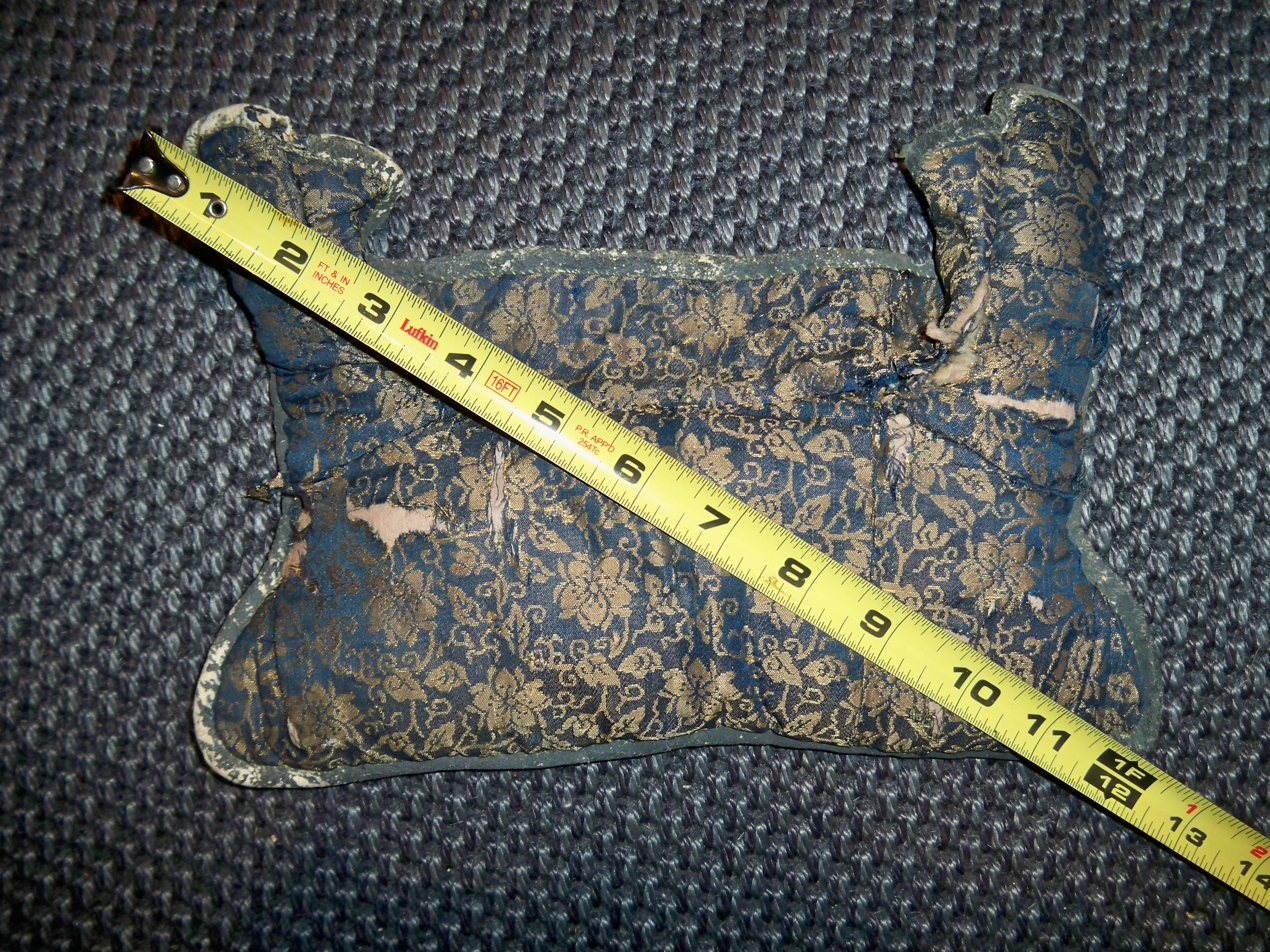
Tare-eri, reverse view.

=== Kōgake ===
Kōgake are various types of armoured socks that could cover just the top of the foot or be worn as a shoe or slipper. Kōgake could be covered with small iron plates or chainmail.

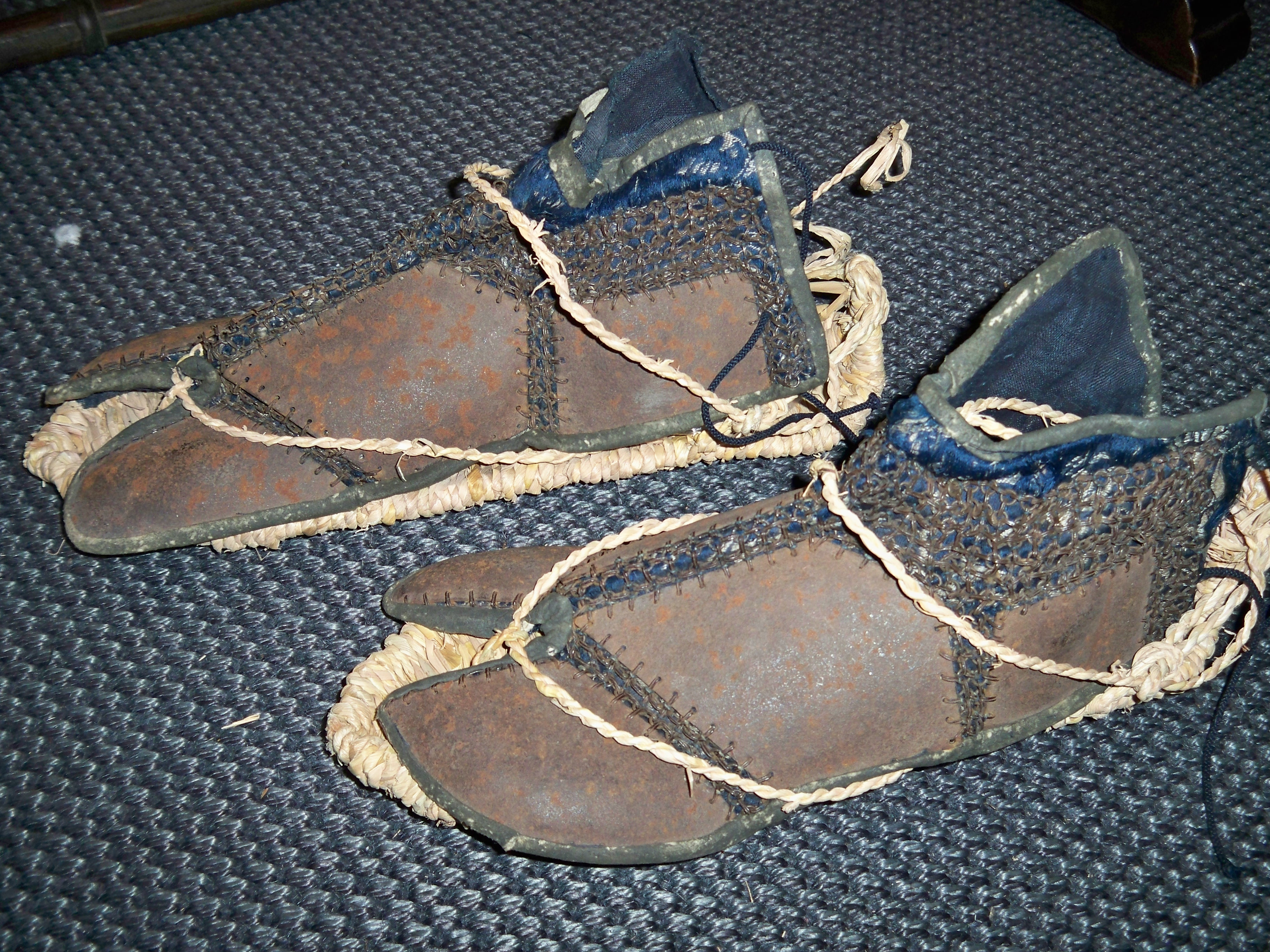

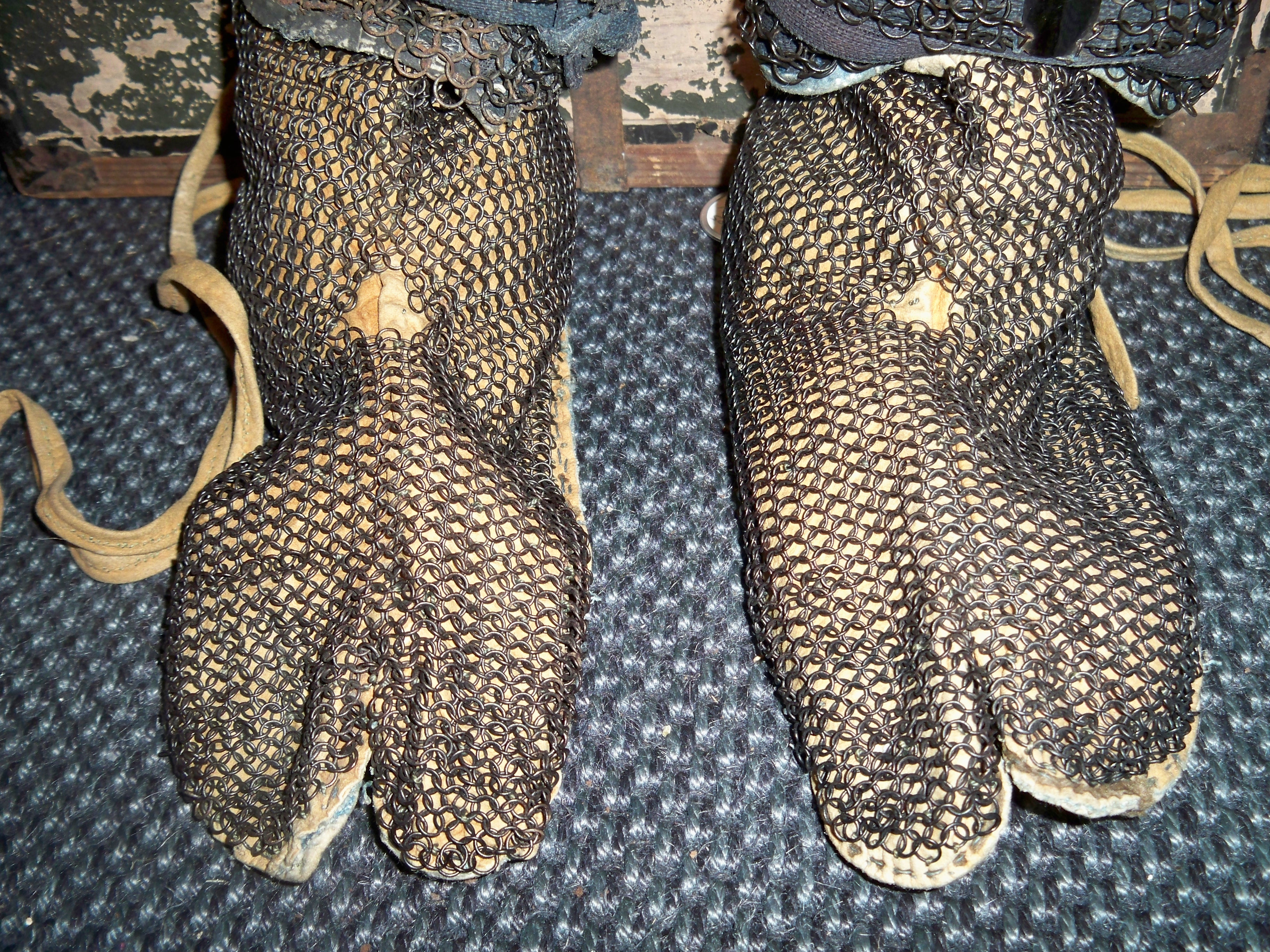

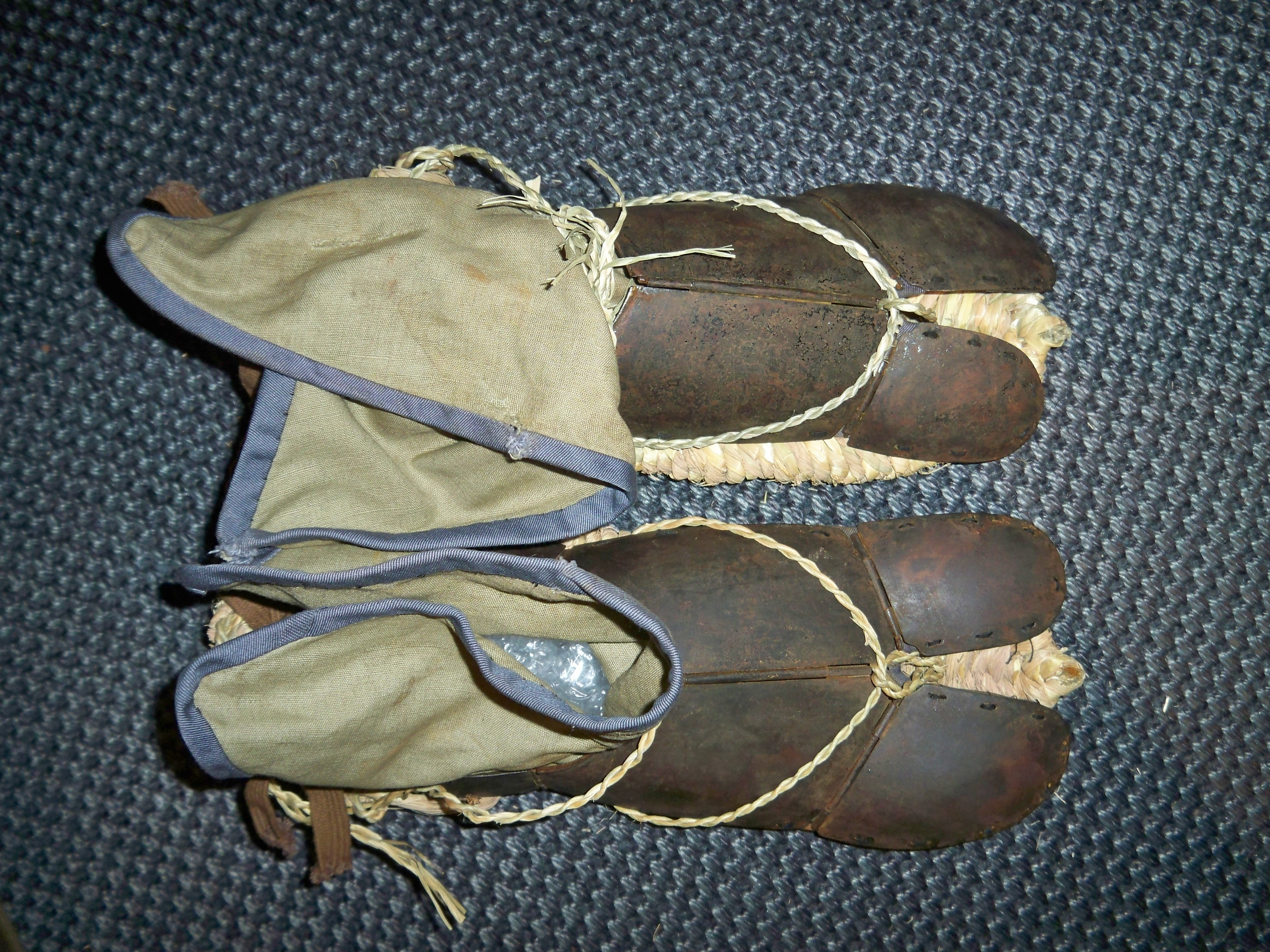

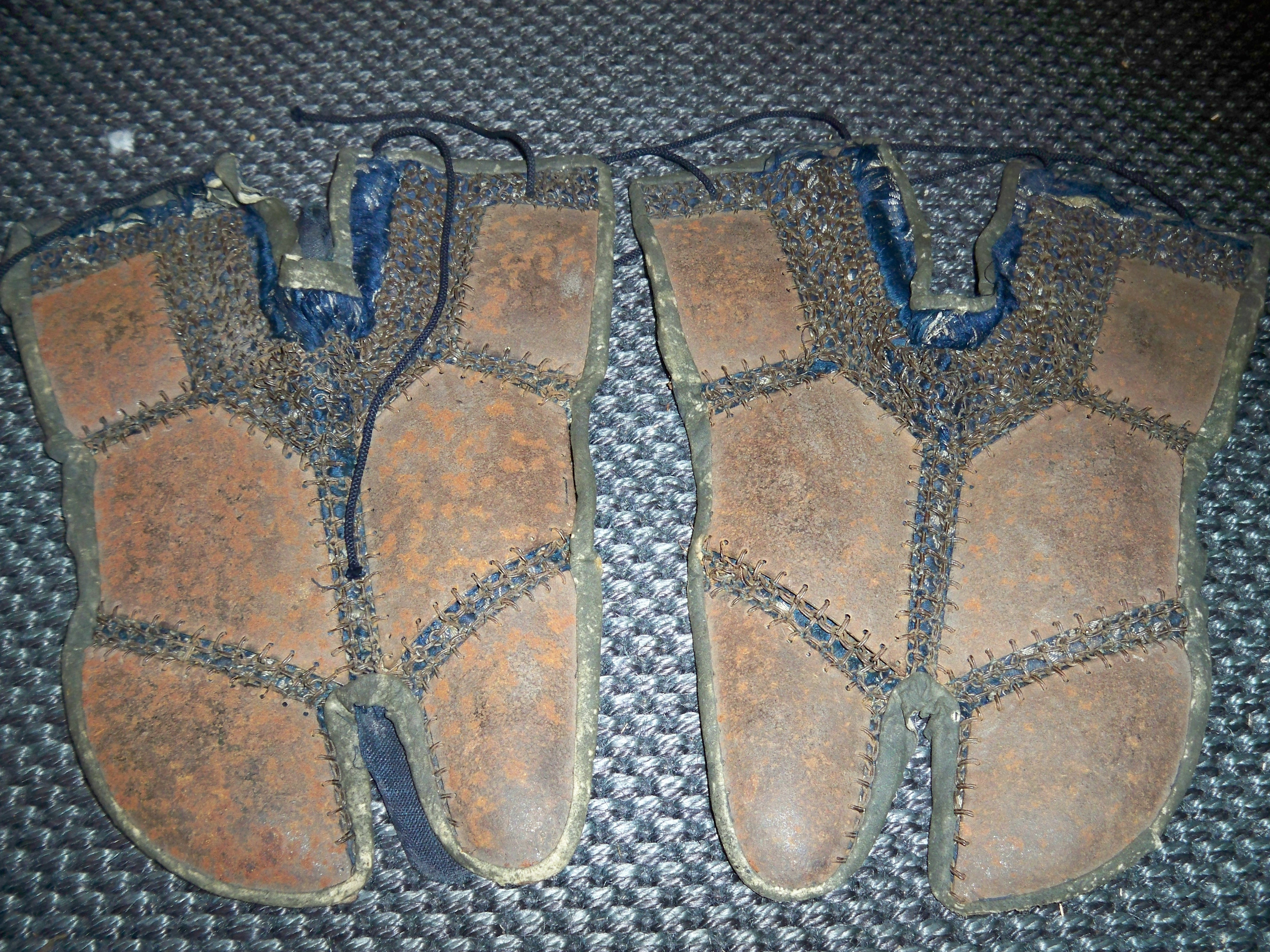

=== Nodowa and guruwa ===
Nodowa and guruwa are similar types of neck protection, the nodowa would be tied around the back of the neck and the guruwa wrapped completely around the neck.

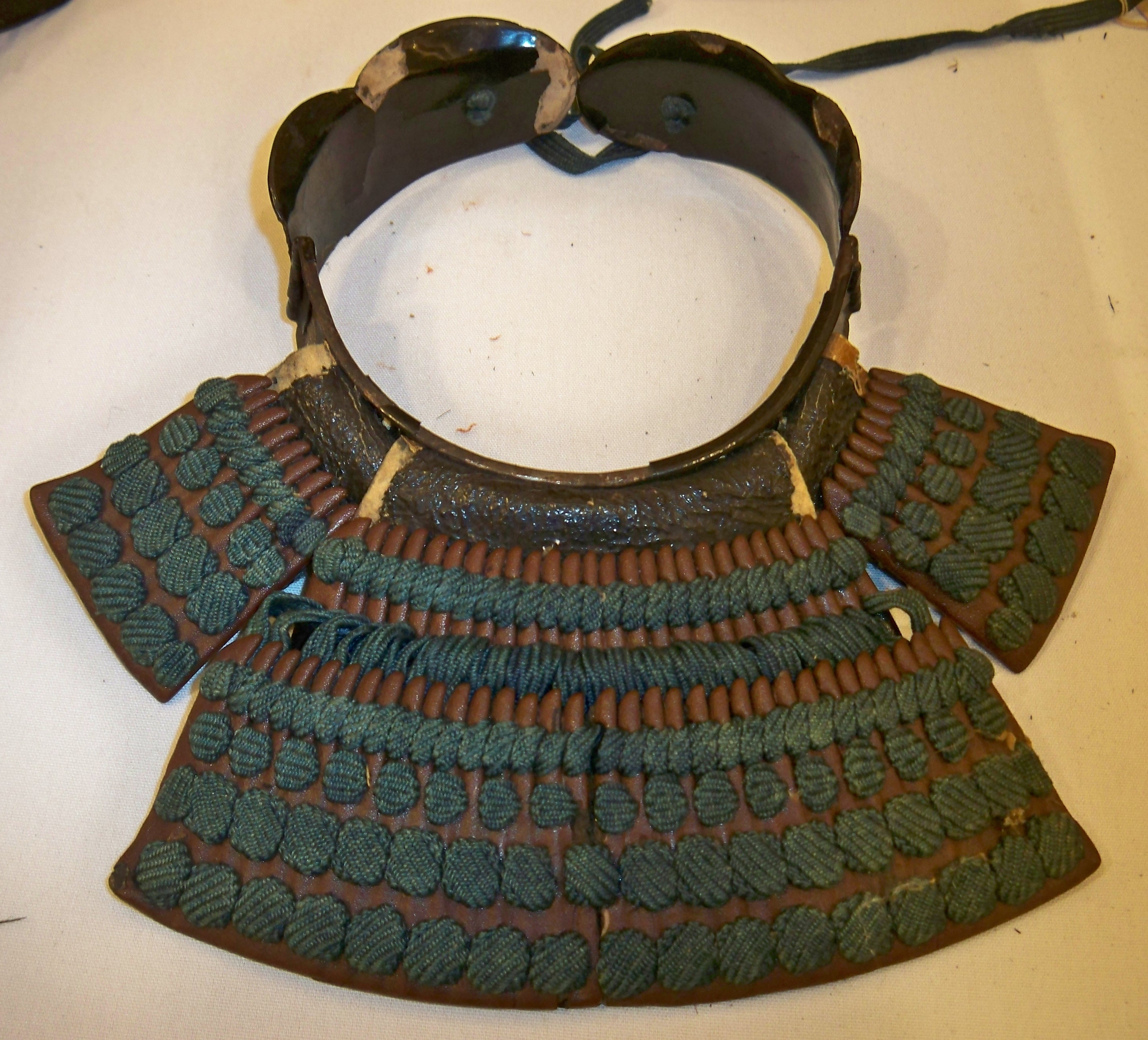

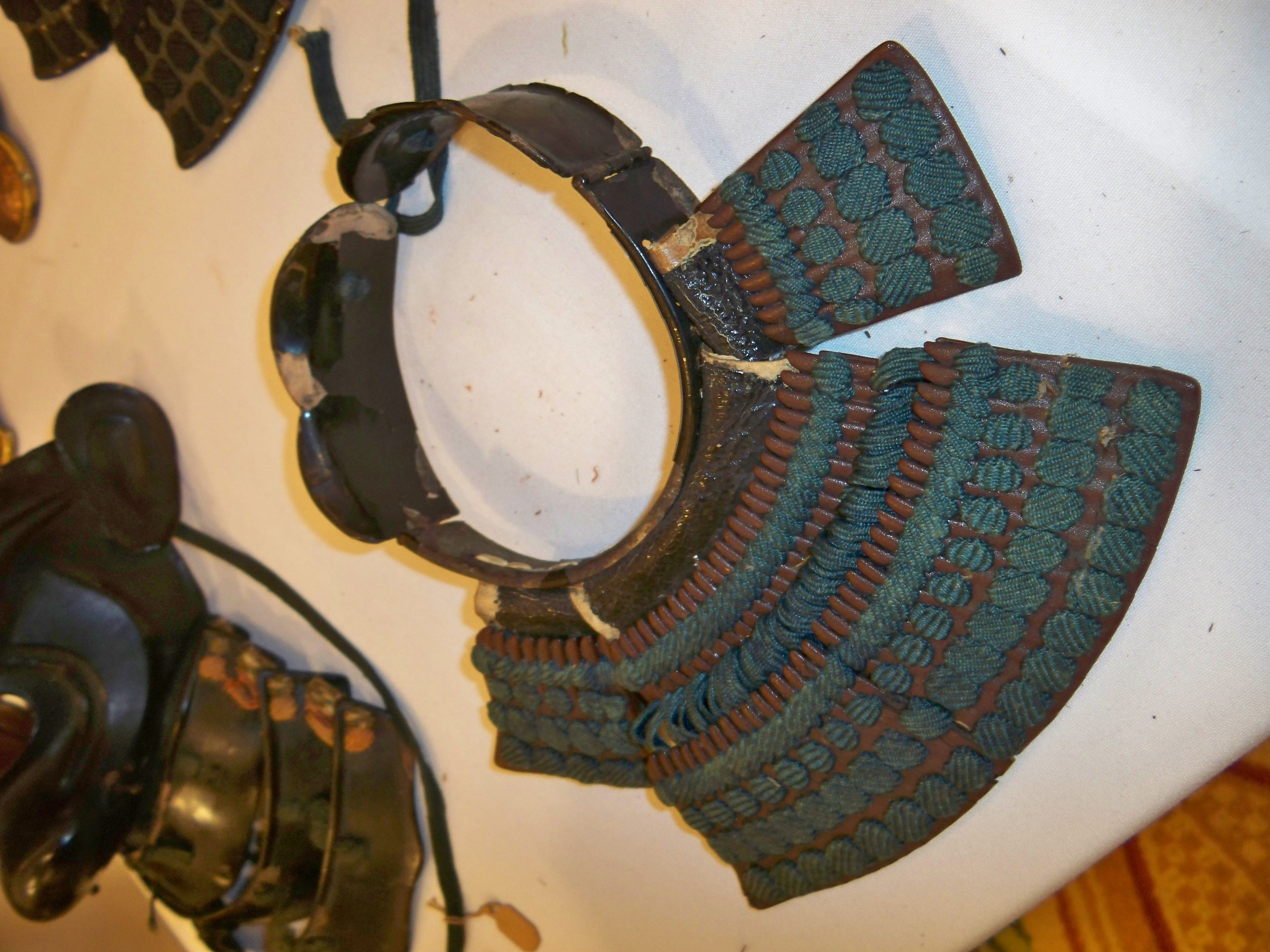

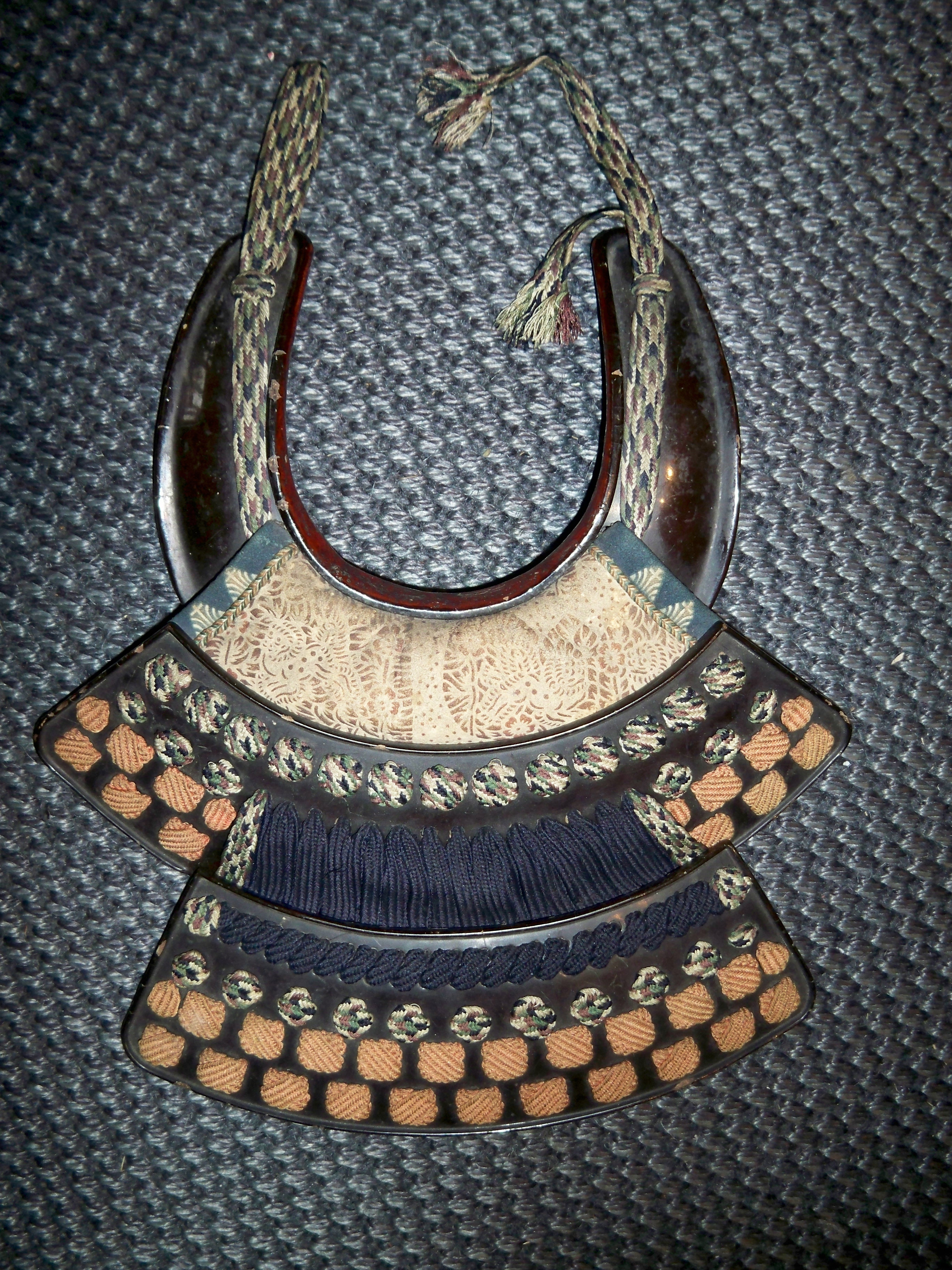

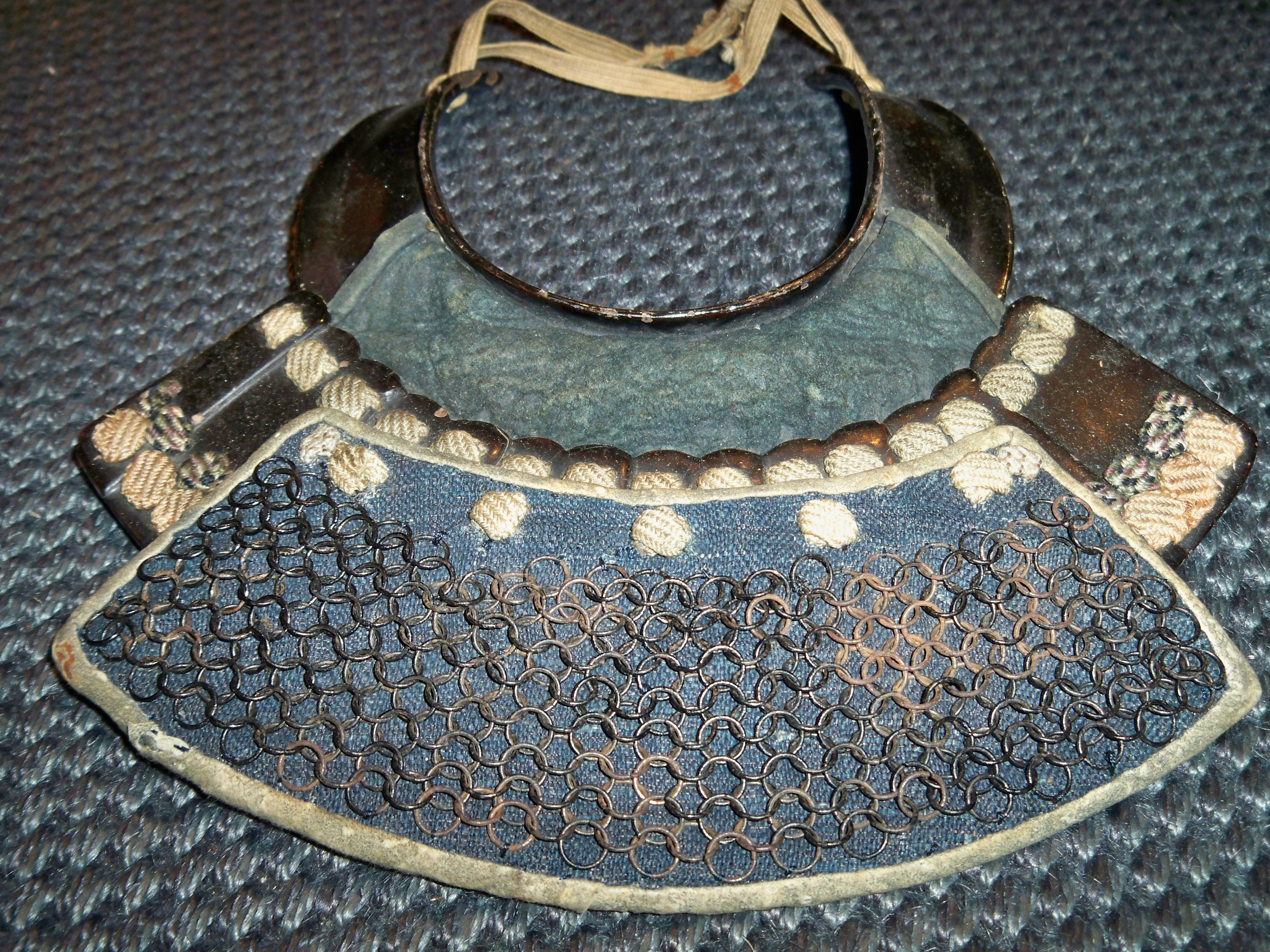

== See also ==
- Japanese armour
