= Kikko (disambiguation) =

Kikko is a type of Japanese samurai armor.

Kikko may also refer to:

- 'Kikko' or 'Kikko-Chiku', a variety of the Phyllostachys edulis bamboo
- Kikko Matsuoka (born 1947), a Japanese actress
- Tatami-do
