= Karuta (armour) =

Feudal era Japanese armour

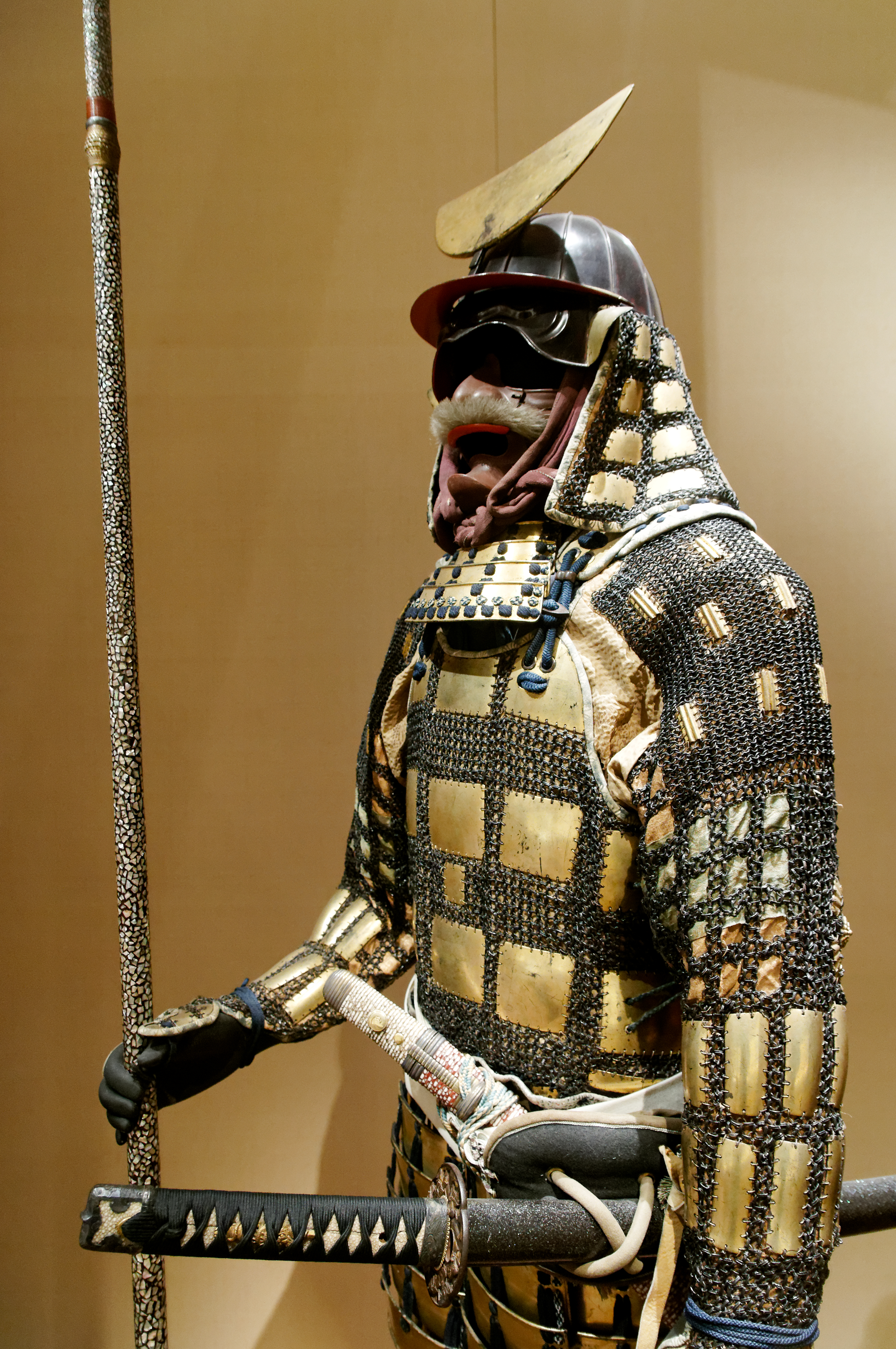
Antique Edo period Japanese (samurai) karuta tatami gusoku, Met Museum

Karuta (カルタ金, karuta-gane) was a type of armour worn by samurai warriors and their retainers during the feudal era of Japan. The word karuta comes from the Portuguese word meaning "card" (carta), as the small square or rectangular plates that compose the armour resemble traditional Japanese playing cards.

== Description ==
Karuta armor is a form of lightweight, folding armor known as "tatami". The "karuta" are small square or rectangle plates of iron or leather connected to each other by kusari (chain mail) or laced to each other, with the plates sewn to a cloth backing, individual karuta armour plates could also be sewn directly to a cloth backing without being connected to each other.

Chest armor was commonly made from karuta (karuta tatami dō). Karuta jackets (karuta katabira) were also made. Various other parts of armor were made from karuta including thigh guards (karuta haidate), shoulder guards (karuta sode) and karuta hoods (karuta zukin). Karuta armor was worn by all classes of samurai, even the foot soldiers (ashigaru). High quality armor was more elaborate and ornate, while the lower quality sets of armor were plain but offered basic protection.

Small amounts of karuta armor plates could be added in certain locations to different styles of samurai armor where extra protection was needed. If the majority of the suit of armor was made from karuta then it is considered karuta armor. Ian Bottomley, in his book Arms and Armor of the Samurai: The History of Weaponry in Ancient Japan, shows a karuta breastplate and a karuta helmet (kabuto).

== Gallery ==
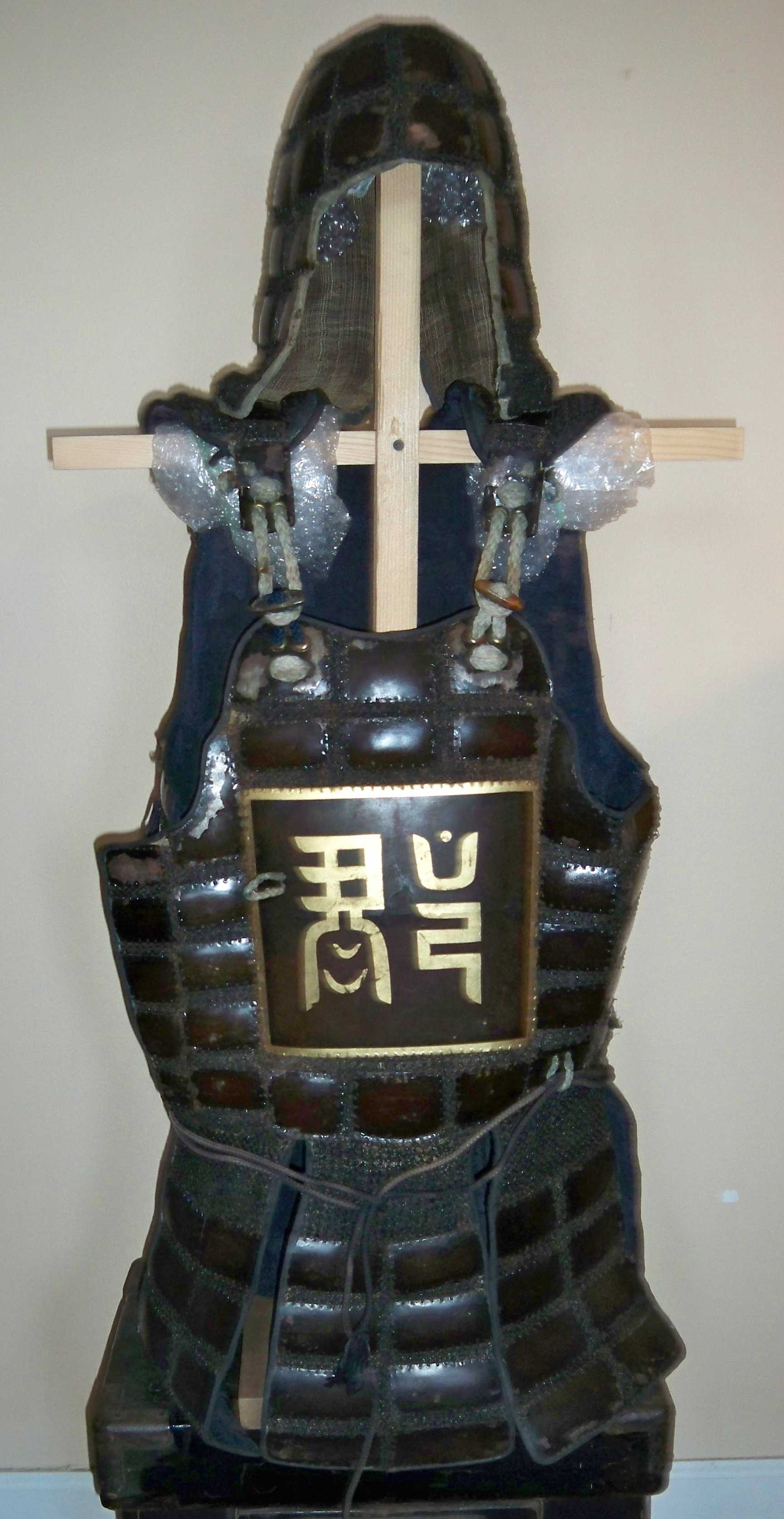
Antique Japanese (samurai) karuta tatami dou (dō) and karuta tatami zukin (hood)

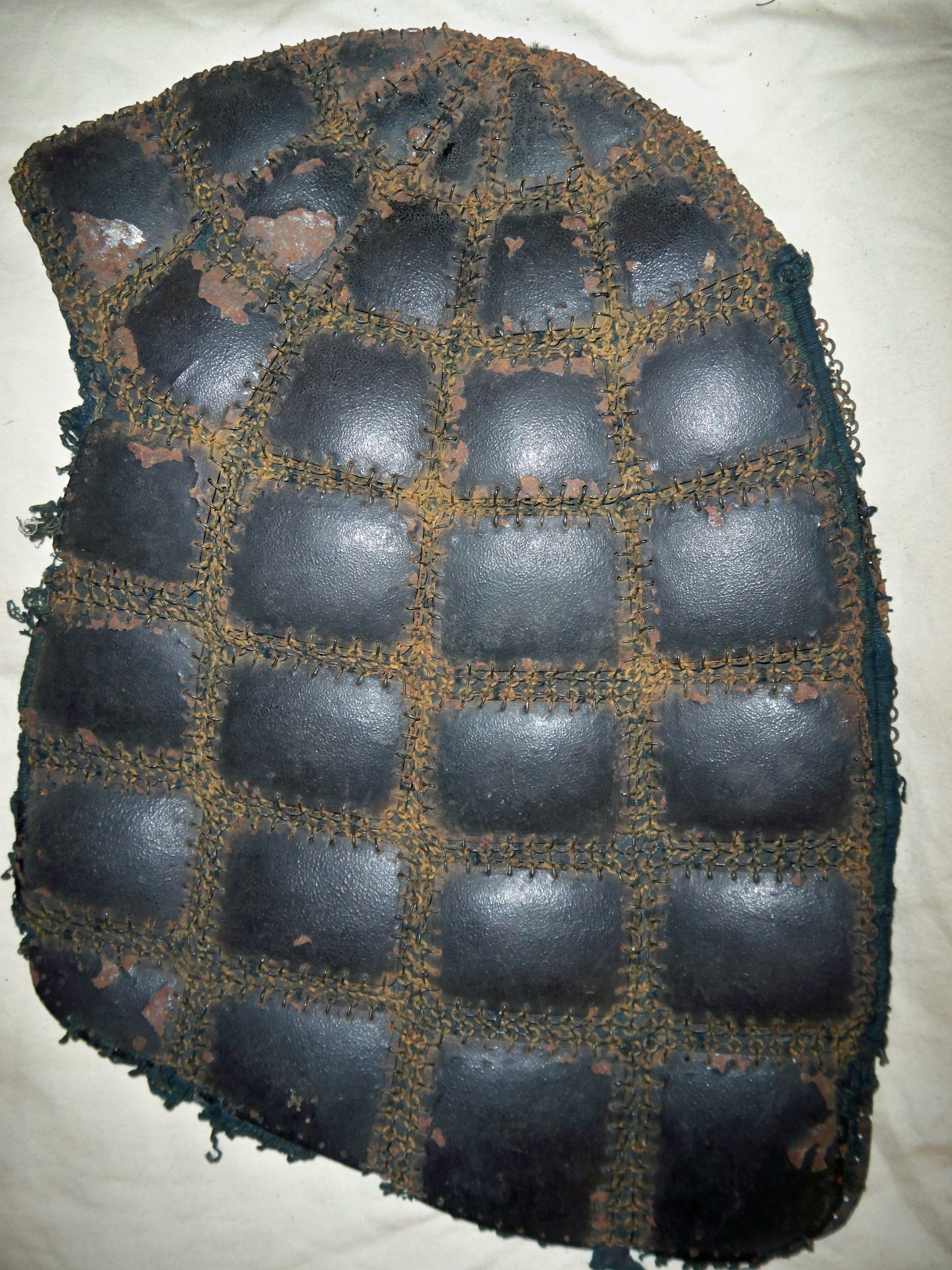
Antique Japanese (samurai) karuta tatami zukin / karuta gane zukin (hood)

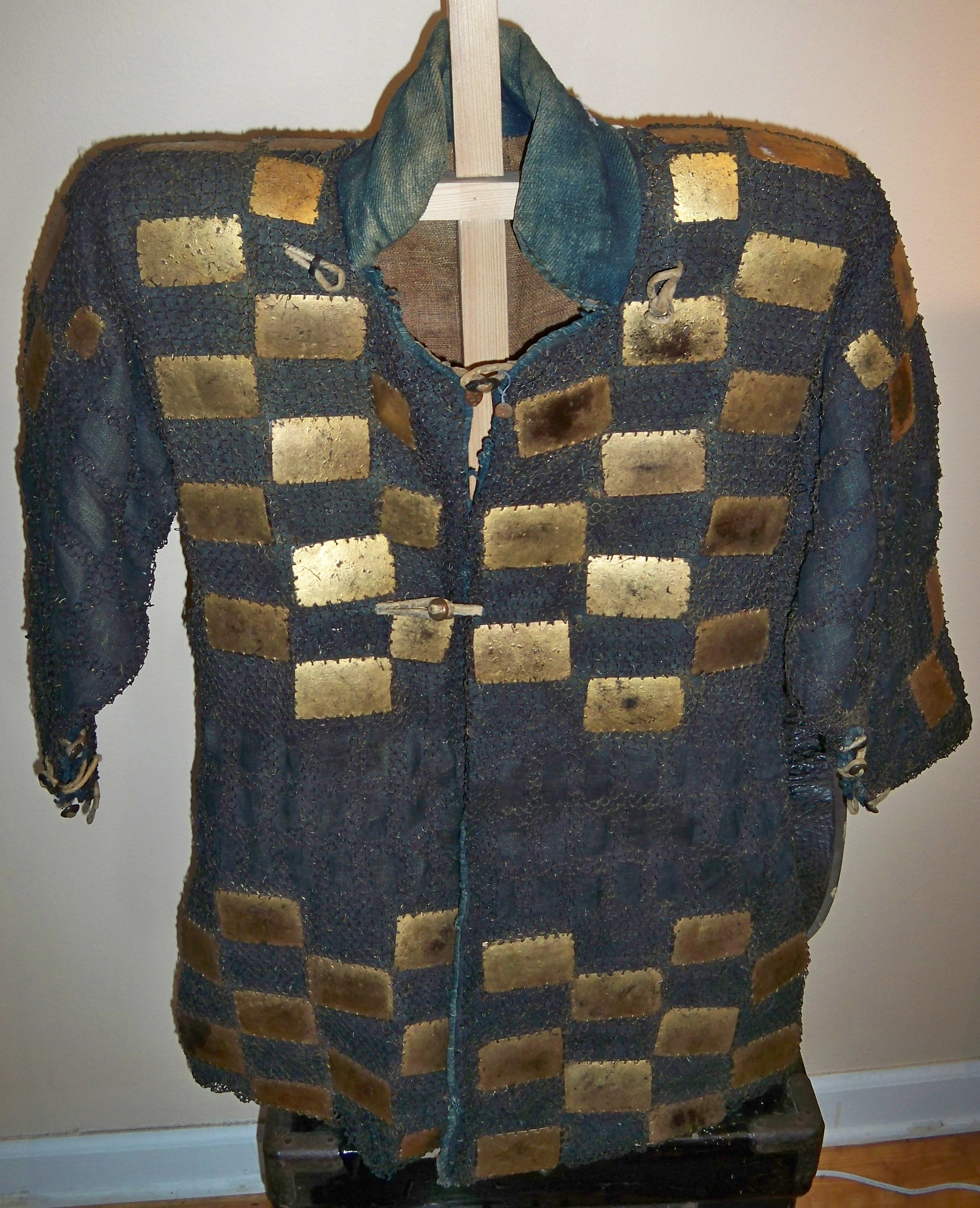
Antique Japanese (samurai) karuta katabira (jacket)

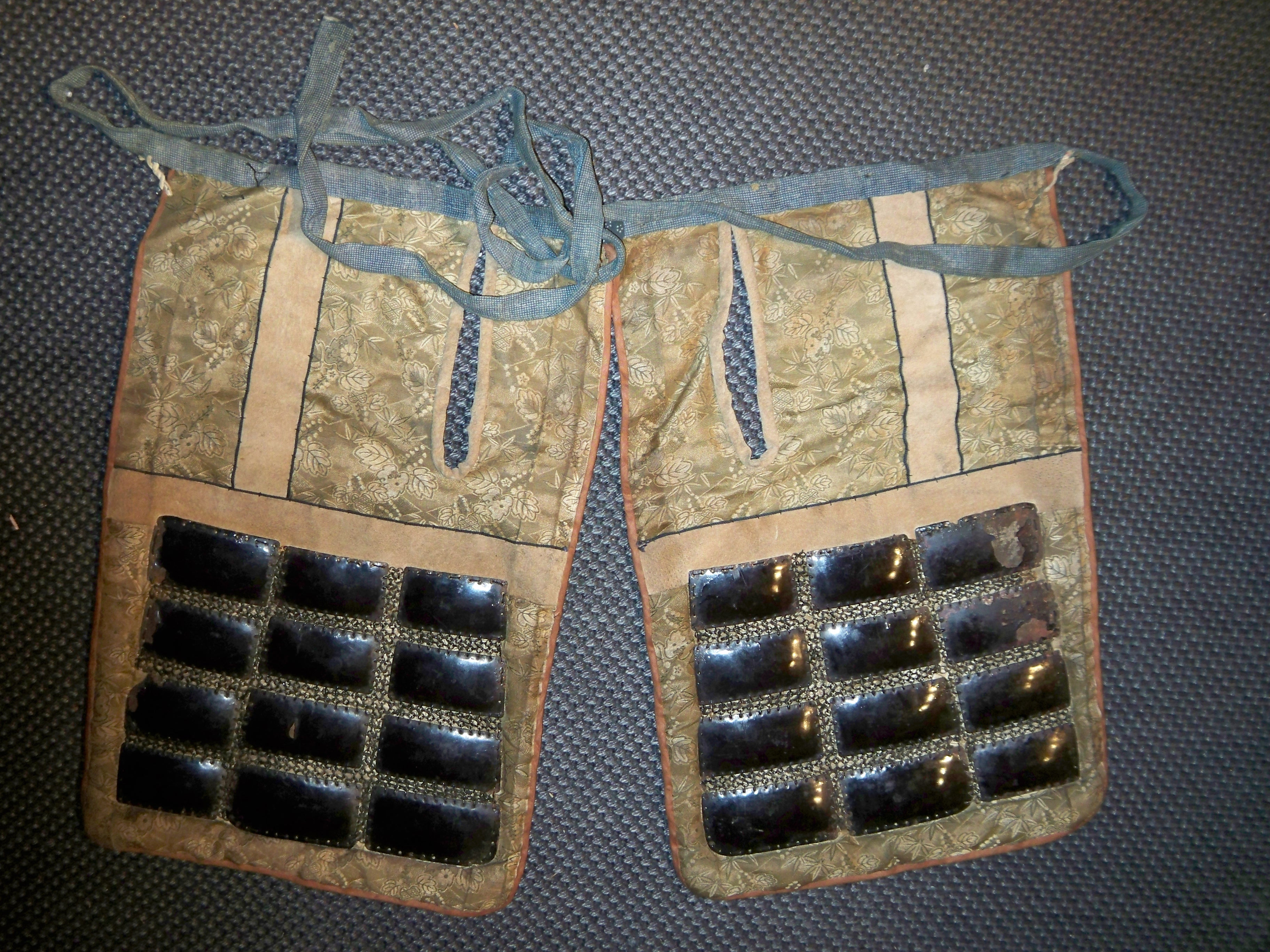
Antique Japanese (samurai) karuta haidate

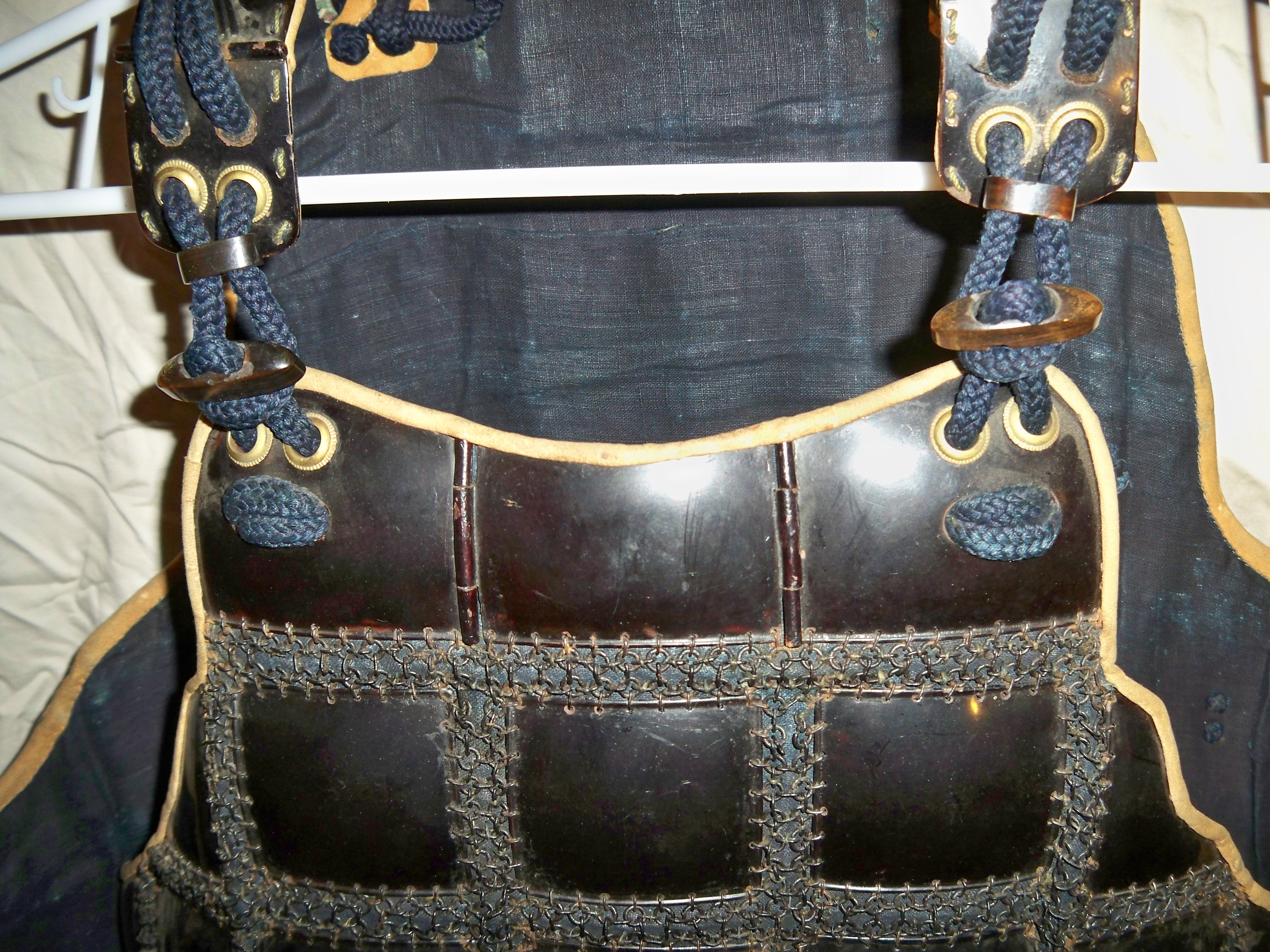
Karuta armour close up view

== See also ==
- Japanese armour
- Tatami (Japanese armour)
- Kusari (Japanese mail armour)
- Kikko (Japanese armour)
- Plated mail
