= Tatami (Japanese armour) =

Japanese armor

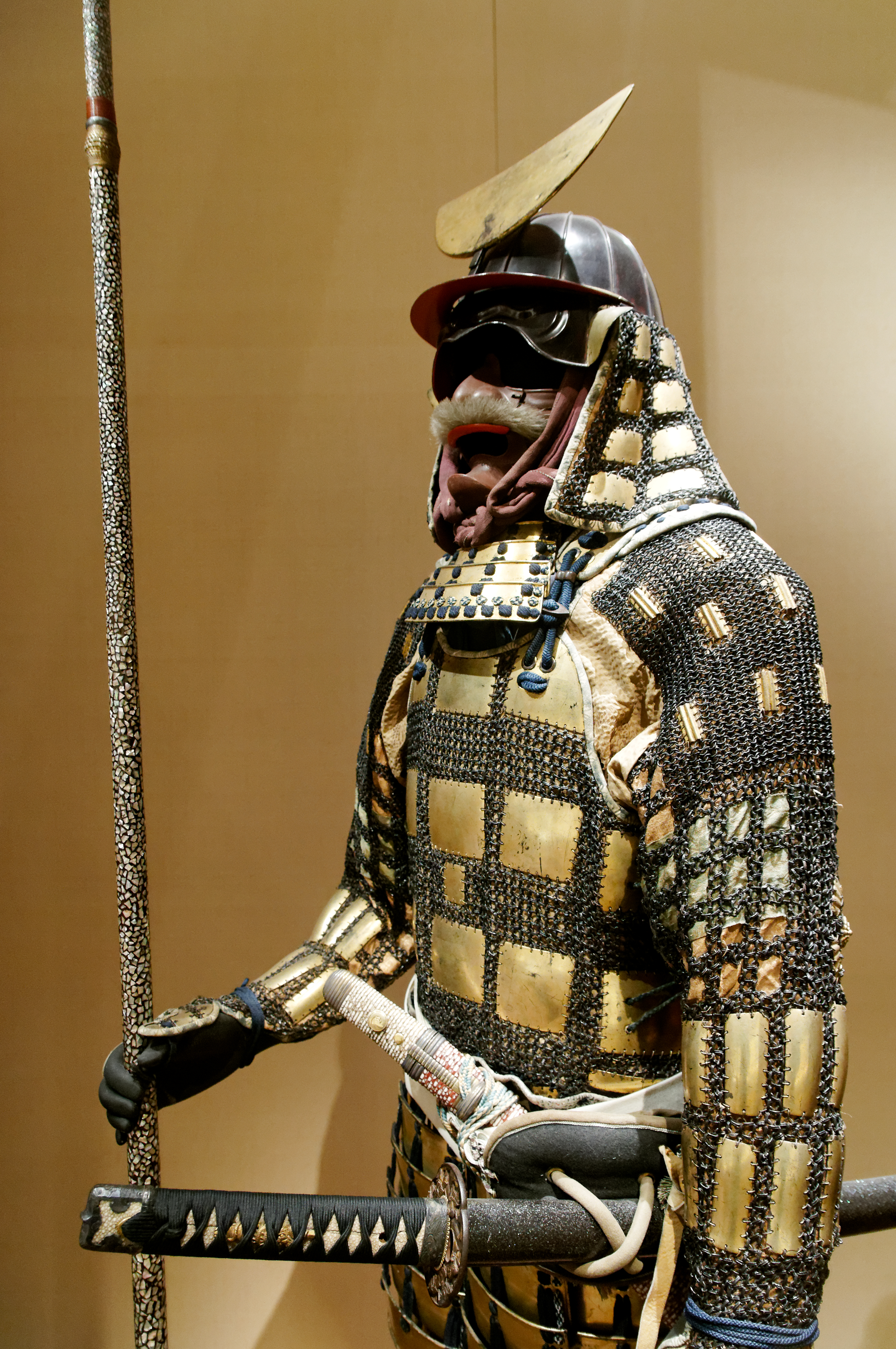
Edo period karuta tatami dō gusoku. A lightweight portable folding (tatami) armour made from small square or rectangle armor plates called karuta. The karuta are usually connected to each other by chainmail and sewn to a cloth backing, Met Museum New York.

Tatami (畳具足), or tatami gusoku (from 畳む tatamu, "to fold", and gusoku, "full suit of armour"), was a type of lightweight portable folding Japanese armour worn during the feudal era of Japan by the samurai class and their foot soldiers (ashigaru). The Tatami dō (a foldable cuirass) or the tatami katabira (an armoured jacket) were the main components of a full suit of tatami armour.

== Structure ==
A tatami gusoku (complete suit of folding armor) includes a tatami dō or tatami katabira (jacket) and a tatami kabuto (helmet) chochin kabuto, or tatami zukin (hood) or similar type of head protection along with the other related parts of a full suit of Japanese armour. Collapsible head protection such as hachi gane and other collapsible armor are also tatami armor; a traditional kabuto could also be part of a tatami gusoku.

Tatami armour was lightweight, portable, convenient for transportation, and they were manufactured inexpensively for the ashigaru light infantry. Tatami armours were worn by all samurai classes from the highest class to the lowest class. The higher class samurai wore elaborate armour while the lower class samurai and retainers wore simpler versions.

In his book Arms and Armor of the Samurai: The History of Weaponry in Ancient Japan Ian Bottomley shows a karuta tatami do and a karuta tatami kabuto (p. 88), and discusses different types of tatami dō karuta gane dō and kikko gane dō on p. 91. George Cameron Stone shows a kikko tatami armor on p. 606 of his book A glossary of the construction, decoration, and use of arms and armor.

== Types of Tatami armour ==
=== Karuta tatami armour ===
- Karuta are small lacquered square or rectangular iron (sometimes leather) plates usually connected together by chainmail and sewn to a cloth backing.
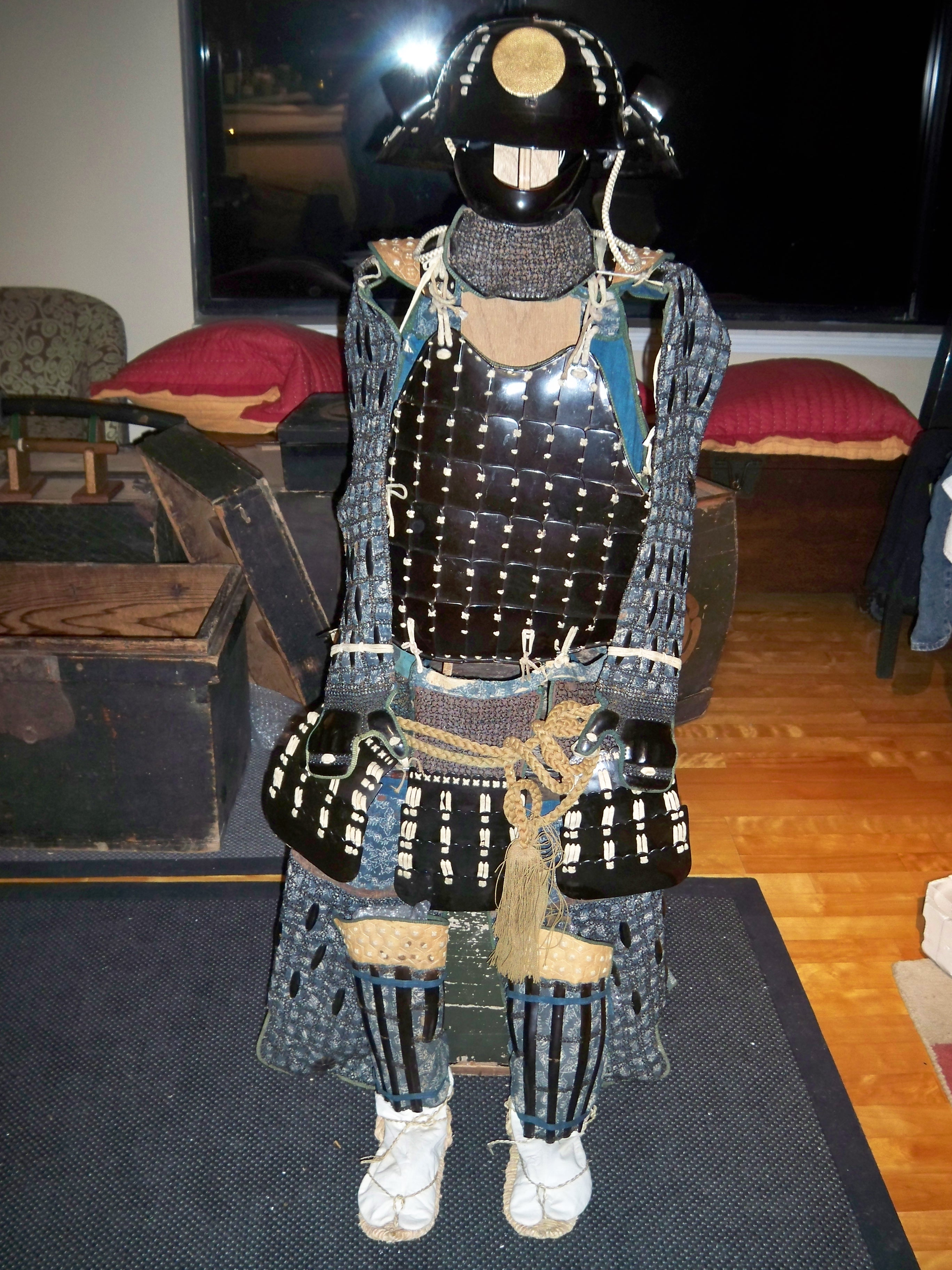
Edo period samurai folding suit of armor tatami gusoku completely matched set with karuta tatami dō and chochin kabuto

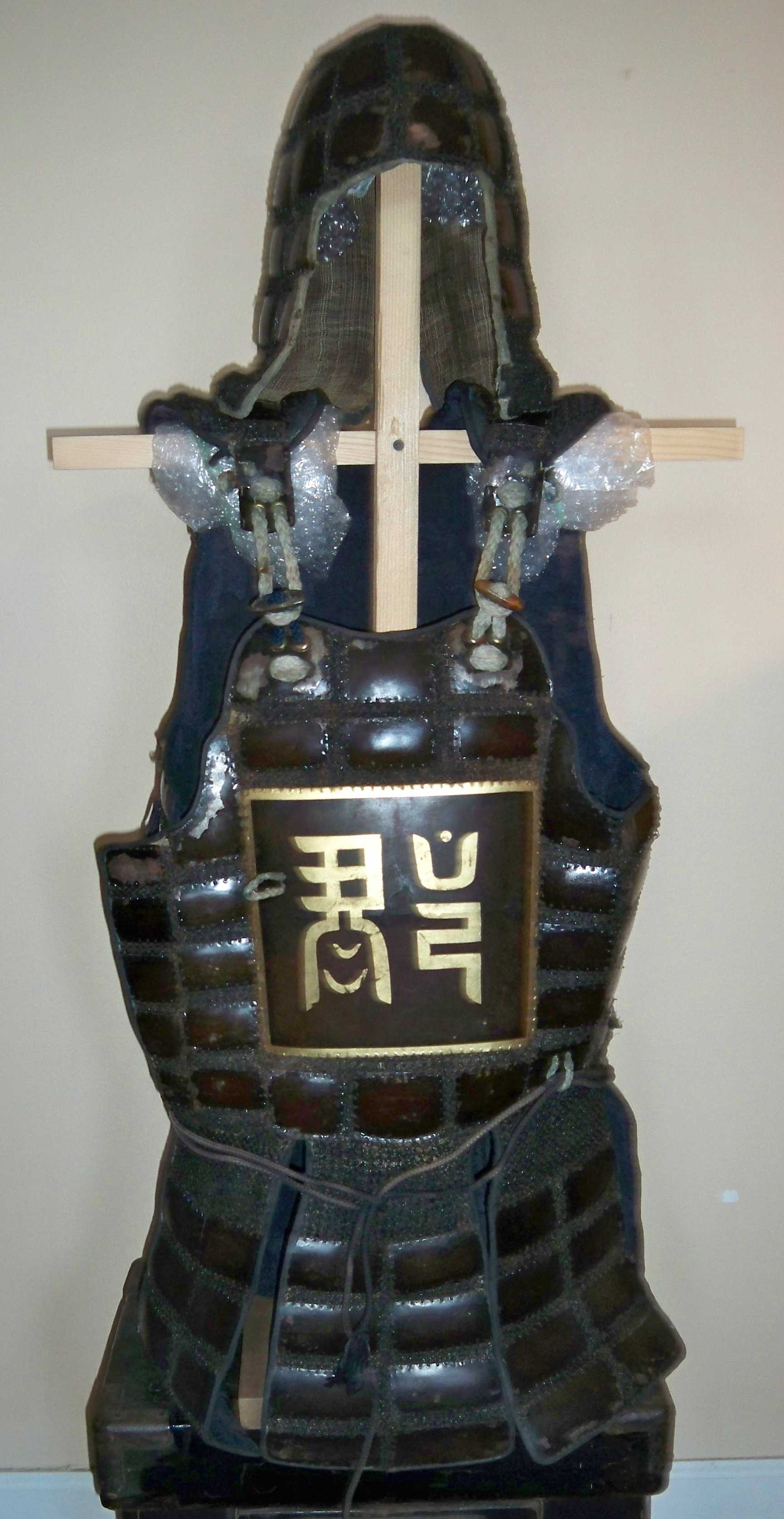
Karuta tatami dō and karuta zukin (hood)

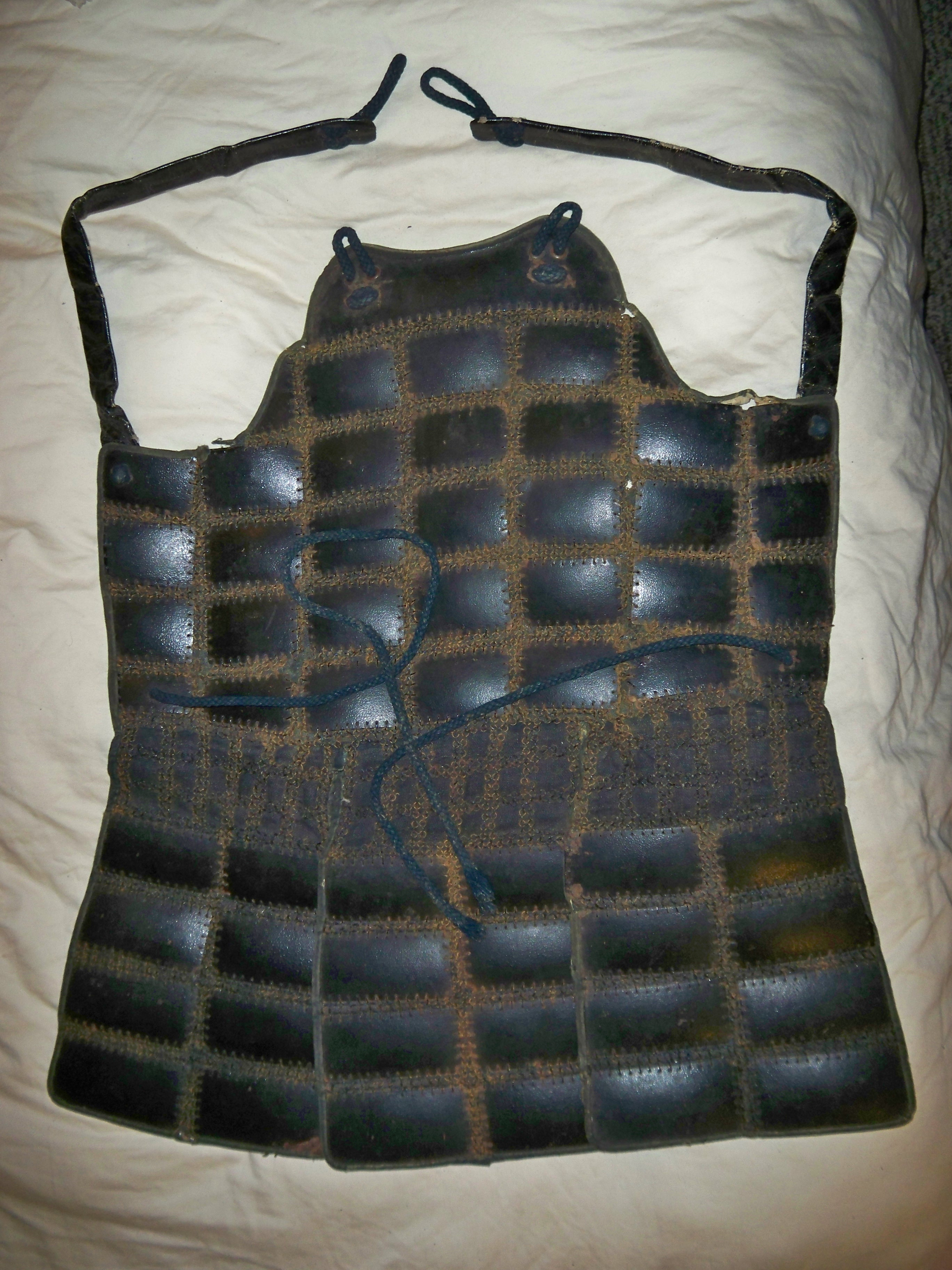
Edo period samurai karuta tatami dō in the hara-ate style

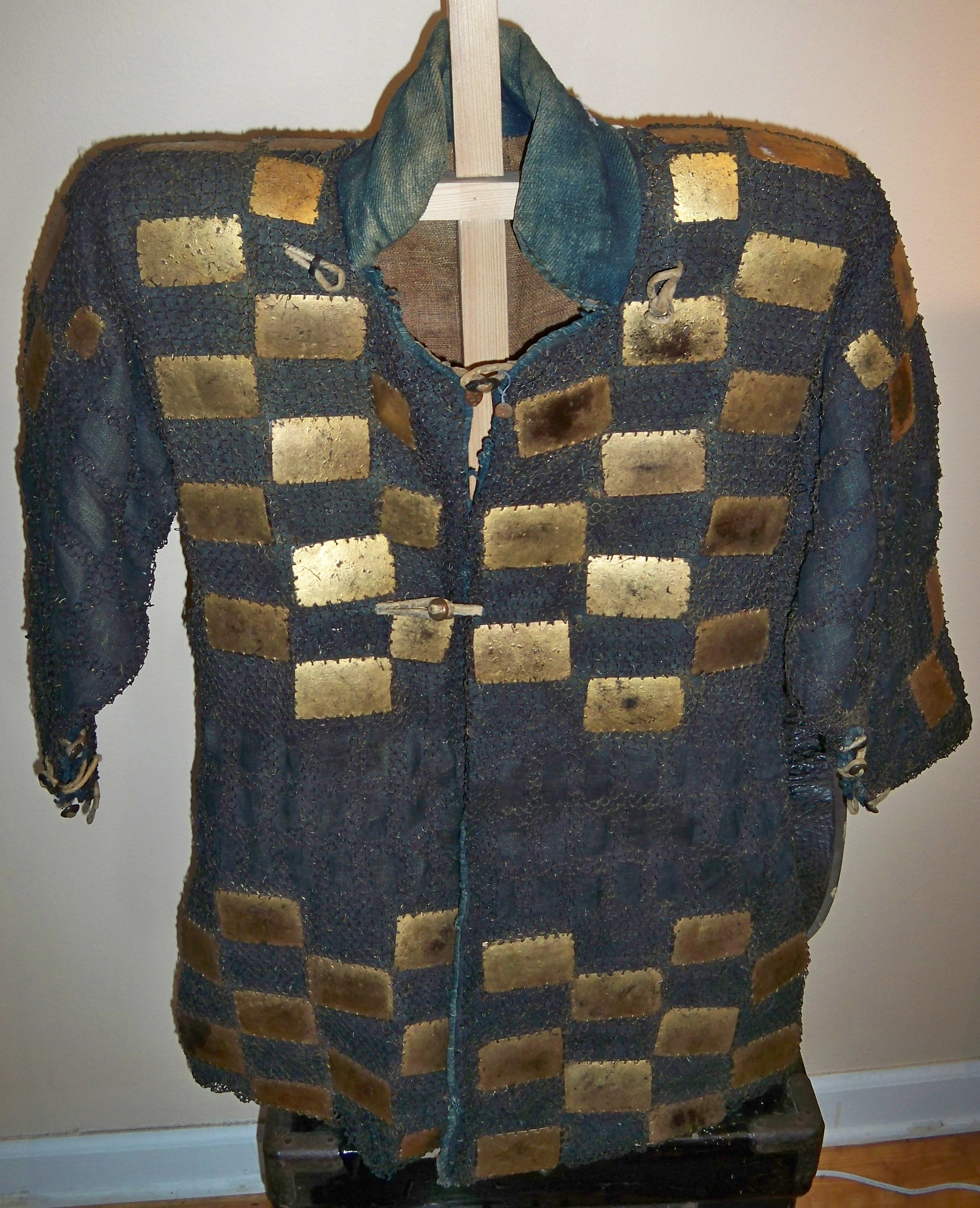
Karuta katabira

=== Kikko tatami armour ===
- Kikko are small iron or leather hexagon plates usually connected together by kusari or chainmail, and sewn to a cloth backing.
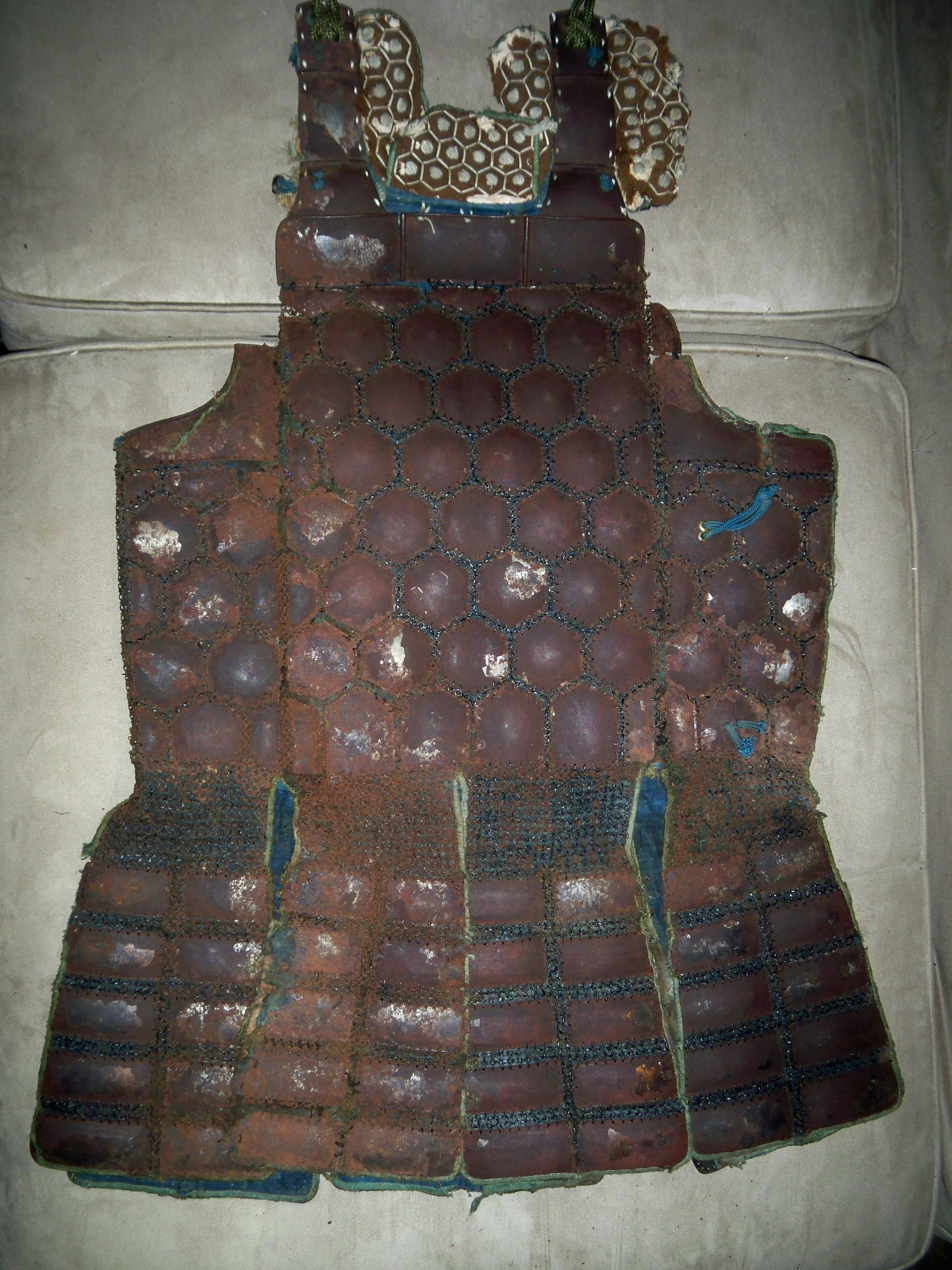
Edo period tetsu kikko tatami dō. A lightweight portable folding tatami cuirass, made from small metal hexagonal plates (kikko), sewn to a cloth backing.

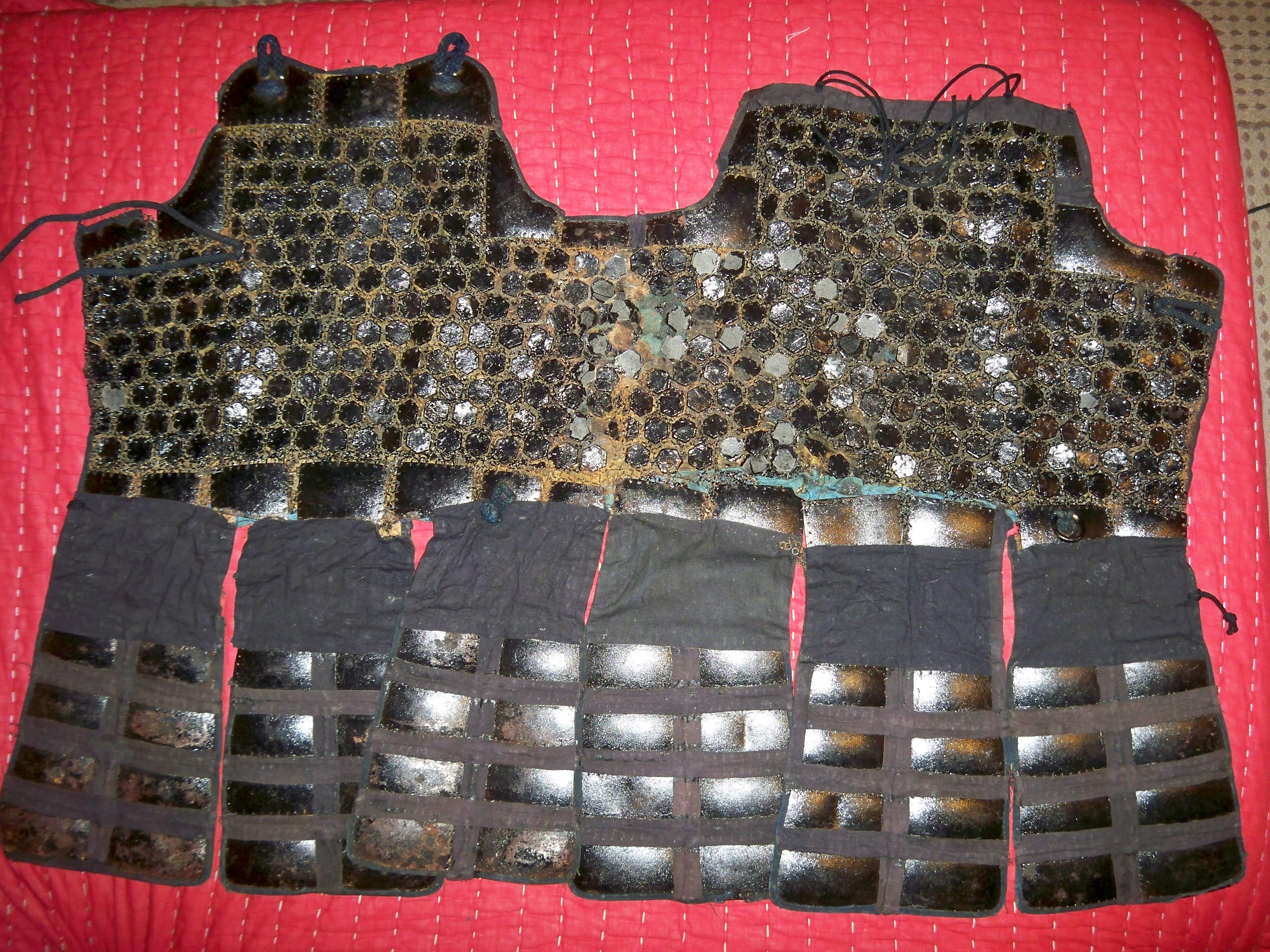
Edo period kikko tatami dō. A cuirass with small hexagon armor plates kikko. The kikko are connected to each other by chainmail and sewn to a cloth backing.

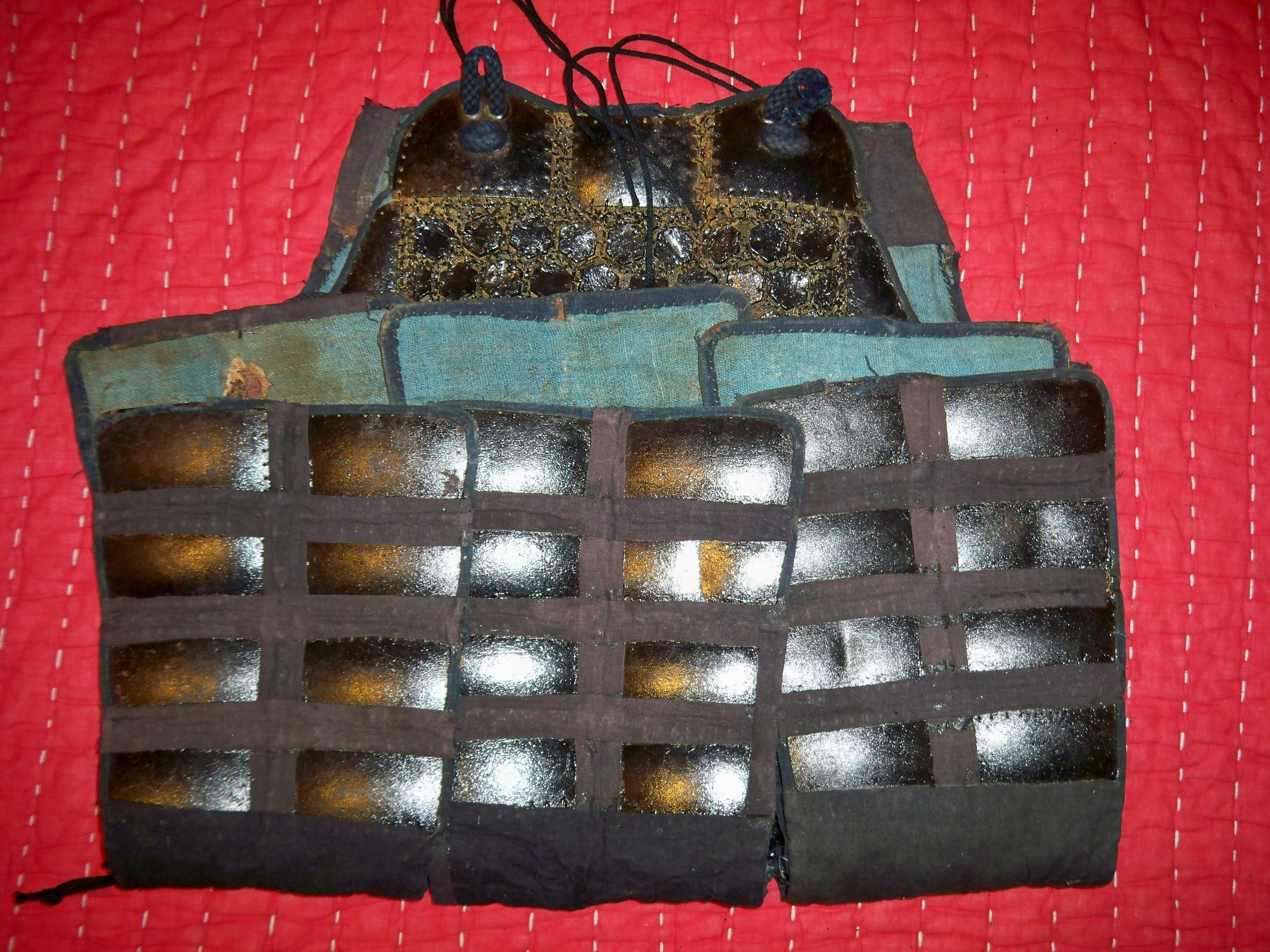
Edo period kikko tatami dō, shown folded up

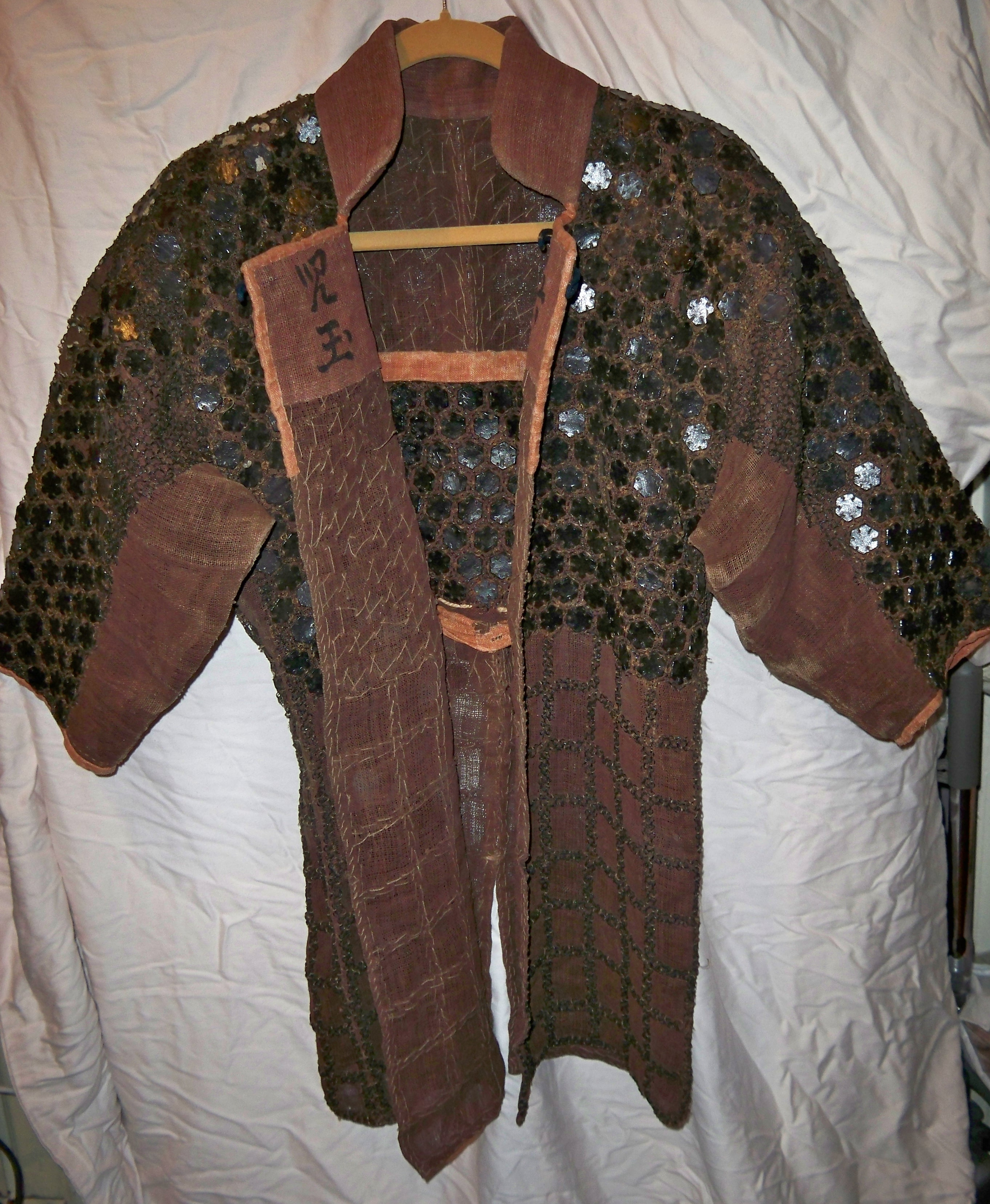
Kikko katabira

=== Kusari tatami armour ===
- Kusari is mail or chain armour, normally sewn to a cloth or leather backing.
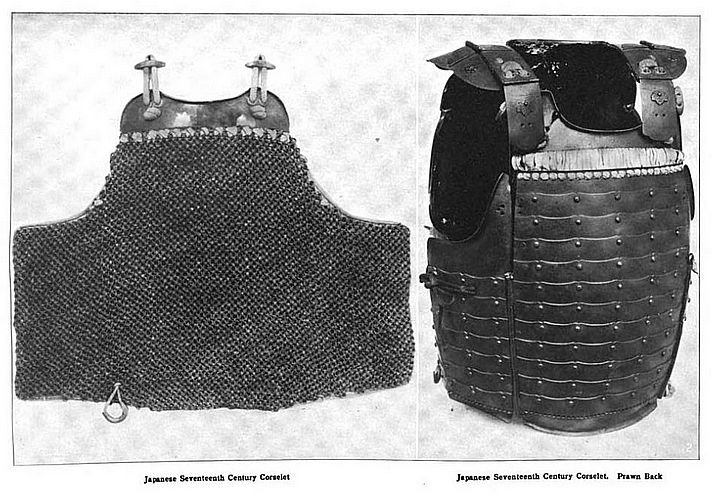
Kusari tatami dō, a cuirass made from chain armour shown next to a traditional iron cuirass

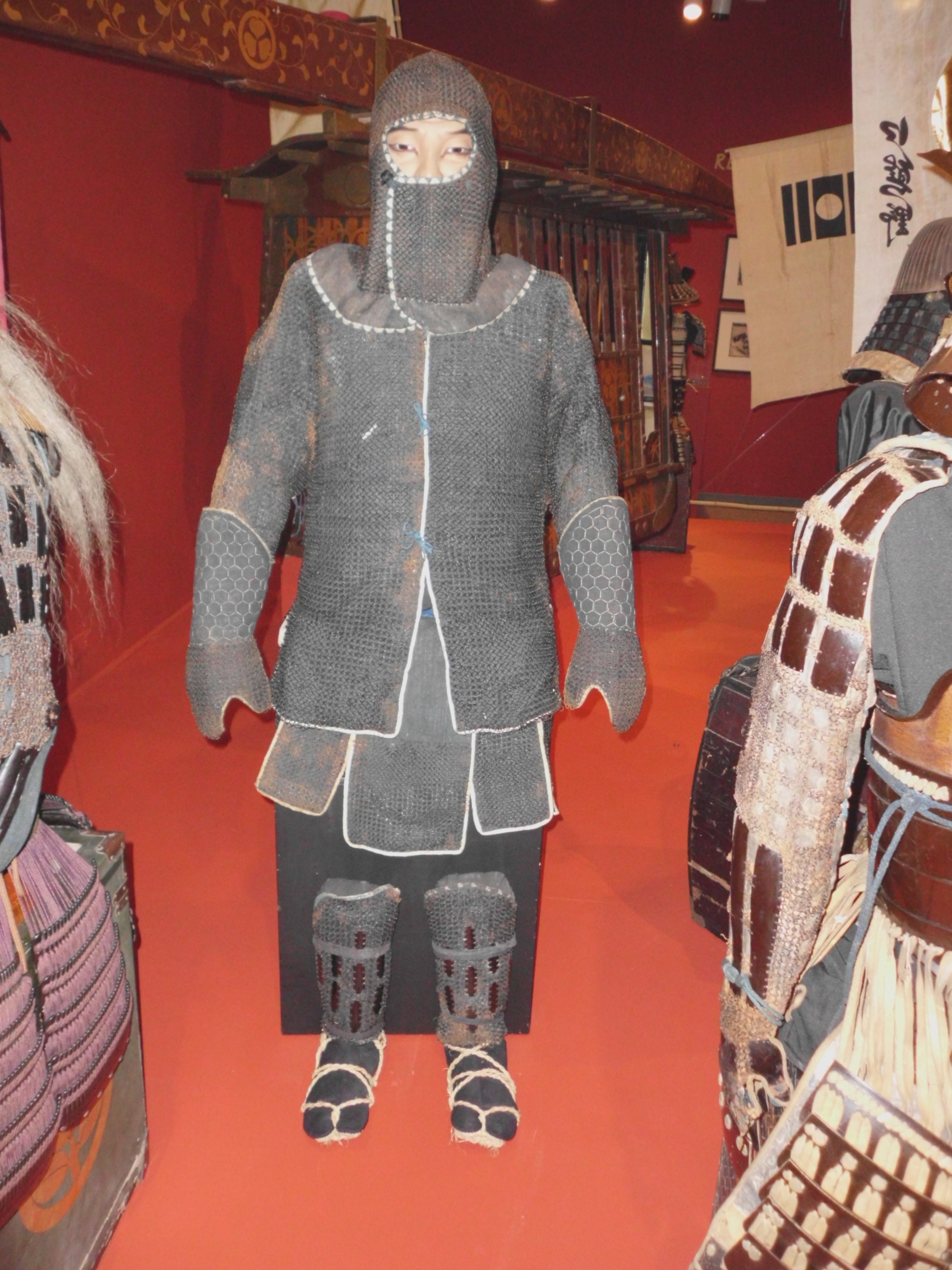
Kusari tatami gusoku, a suit of chain armour

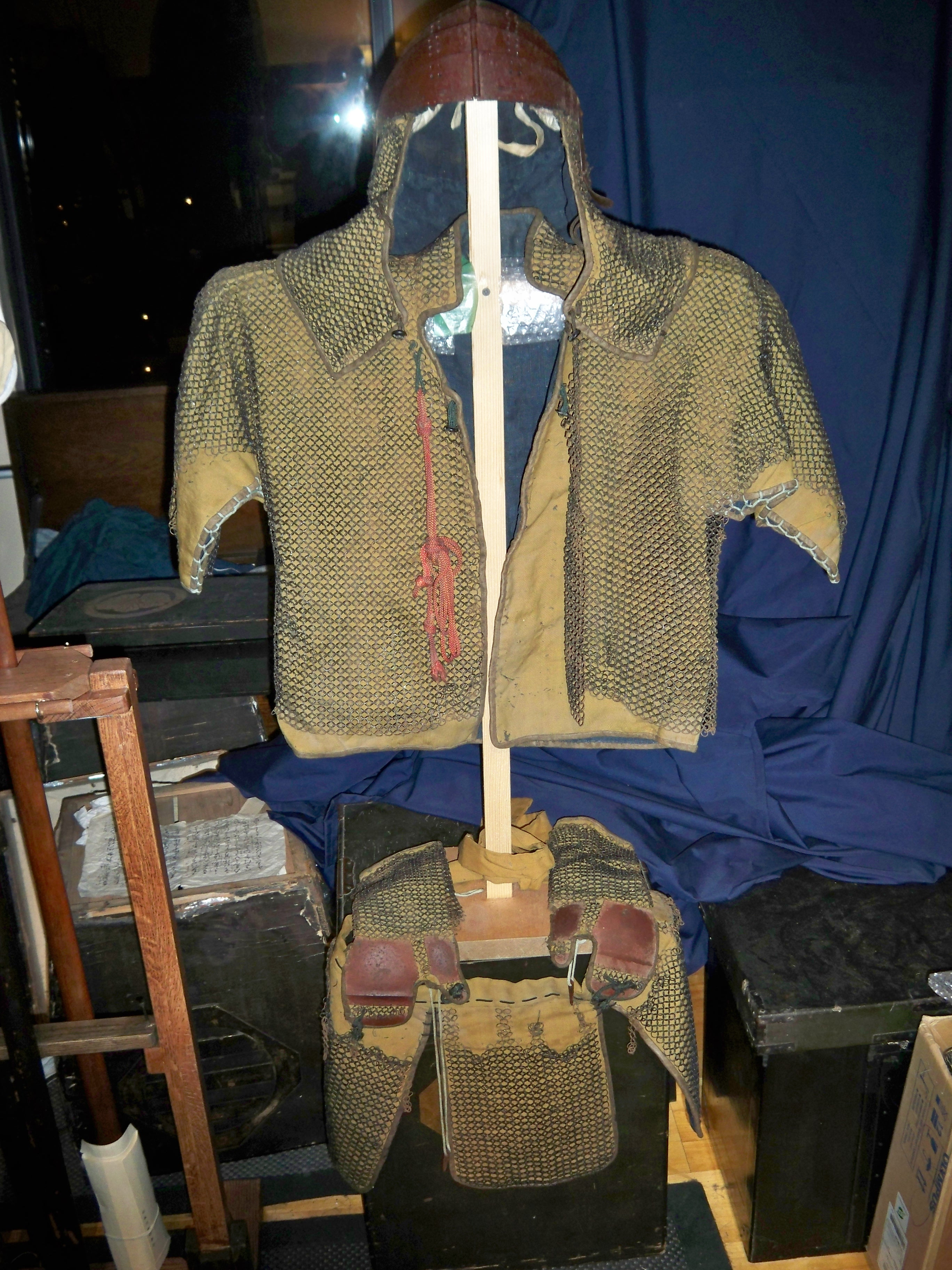
Kusari tatami gusoku, a suit of chain armour

== See also ==
- Dou (dō)
- Plated mail
- Brigandine
- Kikko (Japanese armour)
- Karuta (Japanese armour)
- Kusari (Japanese mail armour)
- Japanese armour
