= Kikko (Japanese armour) =

Japanese armor plates

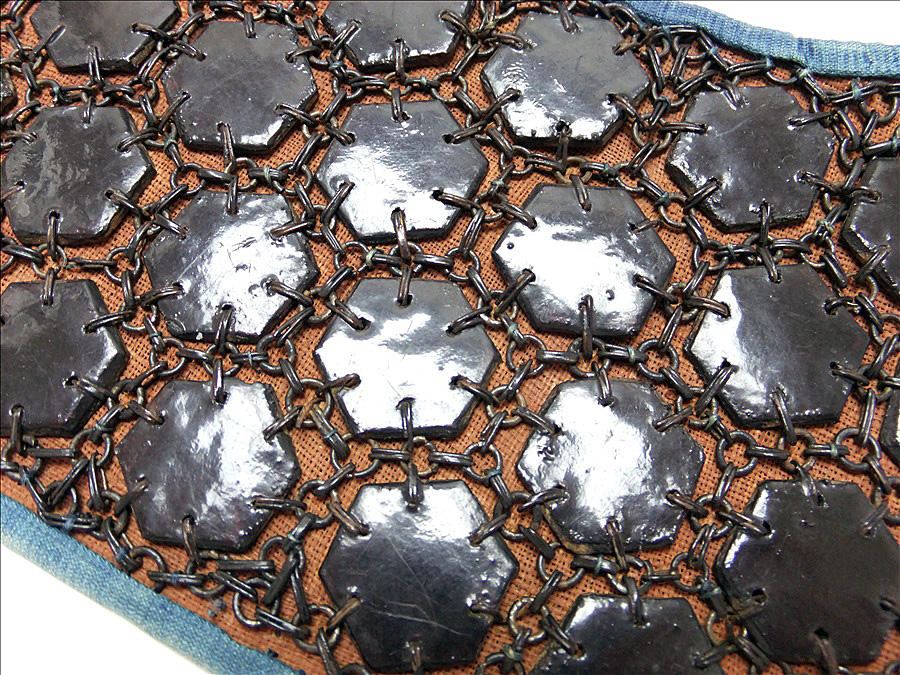
A close up view of a samurai wakibiki showing the kikko plates and mail

Kikko (亀甲, kikkō, literally "turtle-shell") are small iron or hardened leather, hexagon shaped armour plates used in the construction of Japanese armor worn by samurai and ashigaru (foot soldiers) of feudal Japan.

== Description and use ==
Kikkō refers to the shell of the tortoise or turtle which is formed from small hexagon plates. Individual kikko armour plates were attached to armour by sewing the kikko to a cloth lining through holes drilled in the center or edges of the kikko. Kikko could be sewn between two layers of cloth and hidden from sight. The kikko could be attached to each other by links of chainmail holes drilled in the edges of the kikko. Kikko armor was made for every class of samurai or soldier, high or low.

George Cameron Stone referred to kikko as "brigandine" when he said "in Japan, brigandines were often used". He further described this "brigandine" as "small hexagons", "the plates [being] of steel or hard leather", and that "occasionally they covered the whole body".

== Use ==
Kikko were used in the construction of traditional Japanese armour, suneate (greaves) and tate-eri (shoulder pads) often incorporated kikko in their design. Haidate (thigh guards) and kote (sleeves) could also be partially or completely armoured with kikko. Lightweight portable folding armour (kikko tatami gusoku) would have a kikko tatami dōu (folding breastplate), and auxiliary armour items such as wakibiki, manchira, and manju no wa could be armoured with kikko. Kabuto (helmets) could have a neck guard (shikoro) made with kikko plates sewn to a cloth backing.

Ian Bottomley, in his book titled Arms and armor of the samurai: the history of weaponry in ancient Japan, shows a forehead protector ("hitai ate") with a kikko hood, and calls the kikko chest armor ("kikko gane do") a form of "tatami", or folding armor.

== Gallery ==
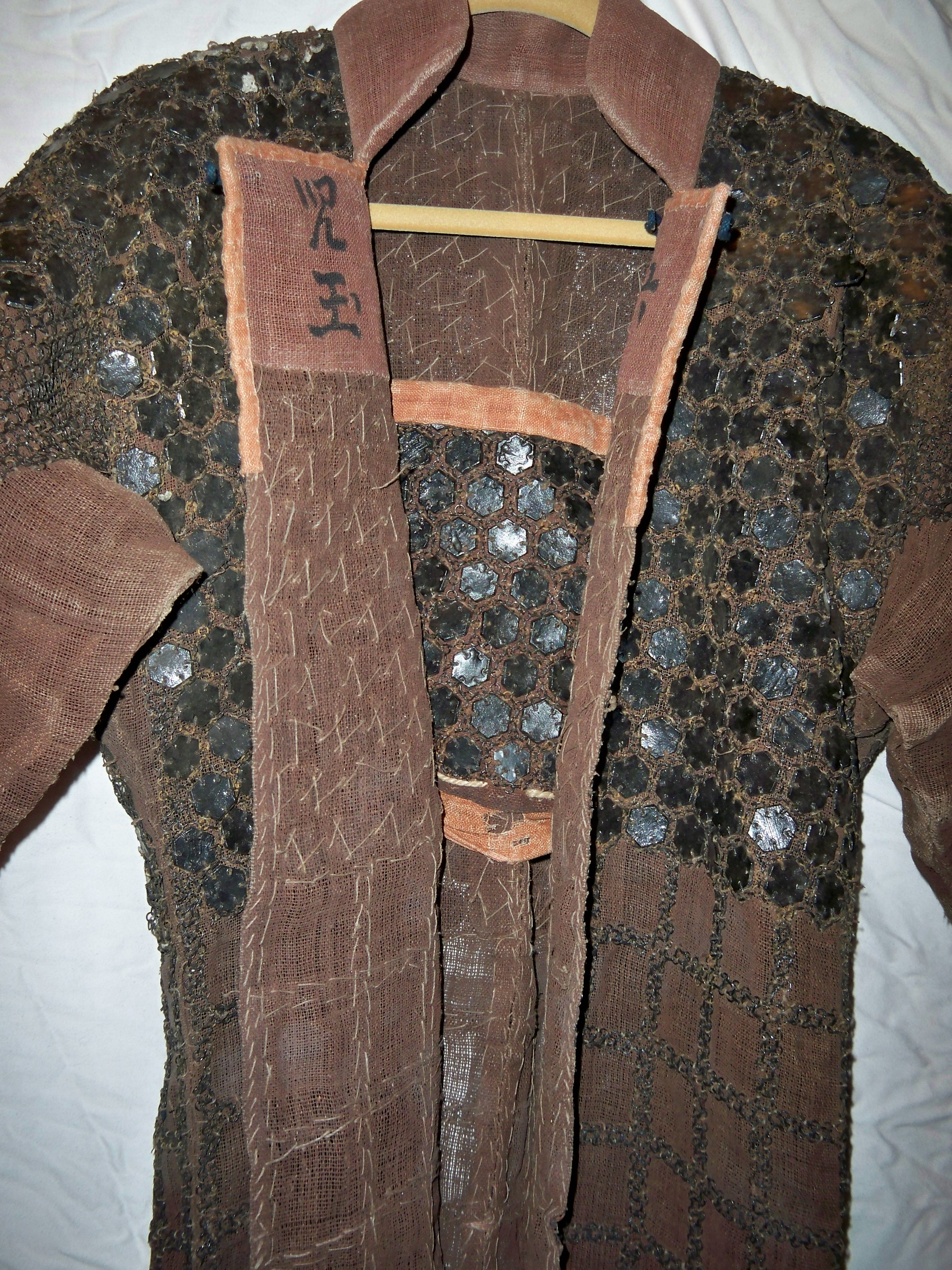
Edo period kikko katabira (jacket)

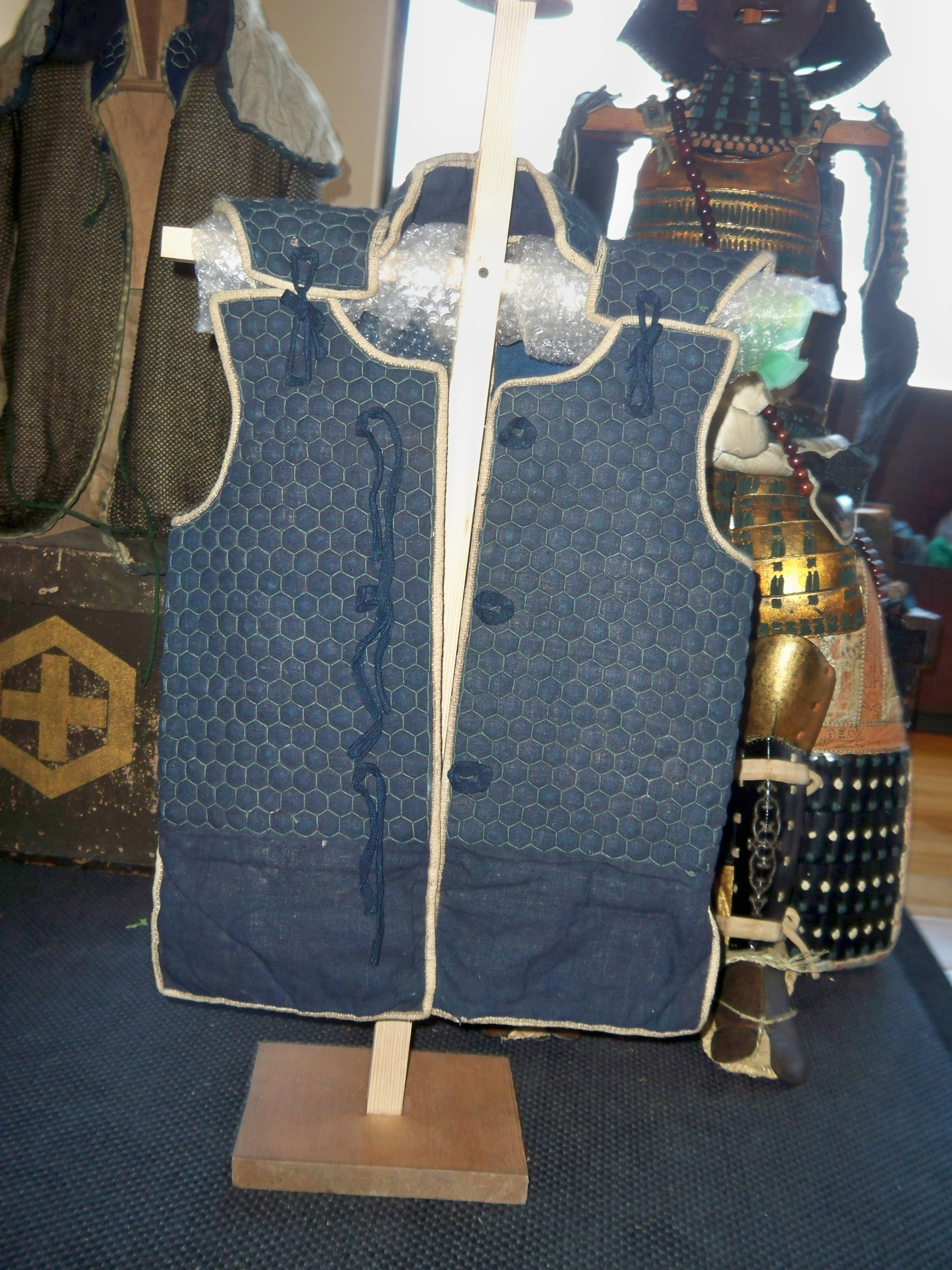
Edo period kikko vest

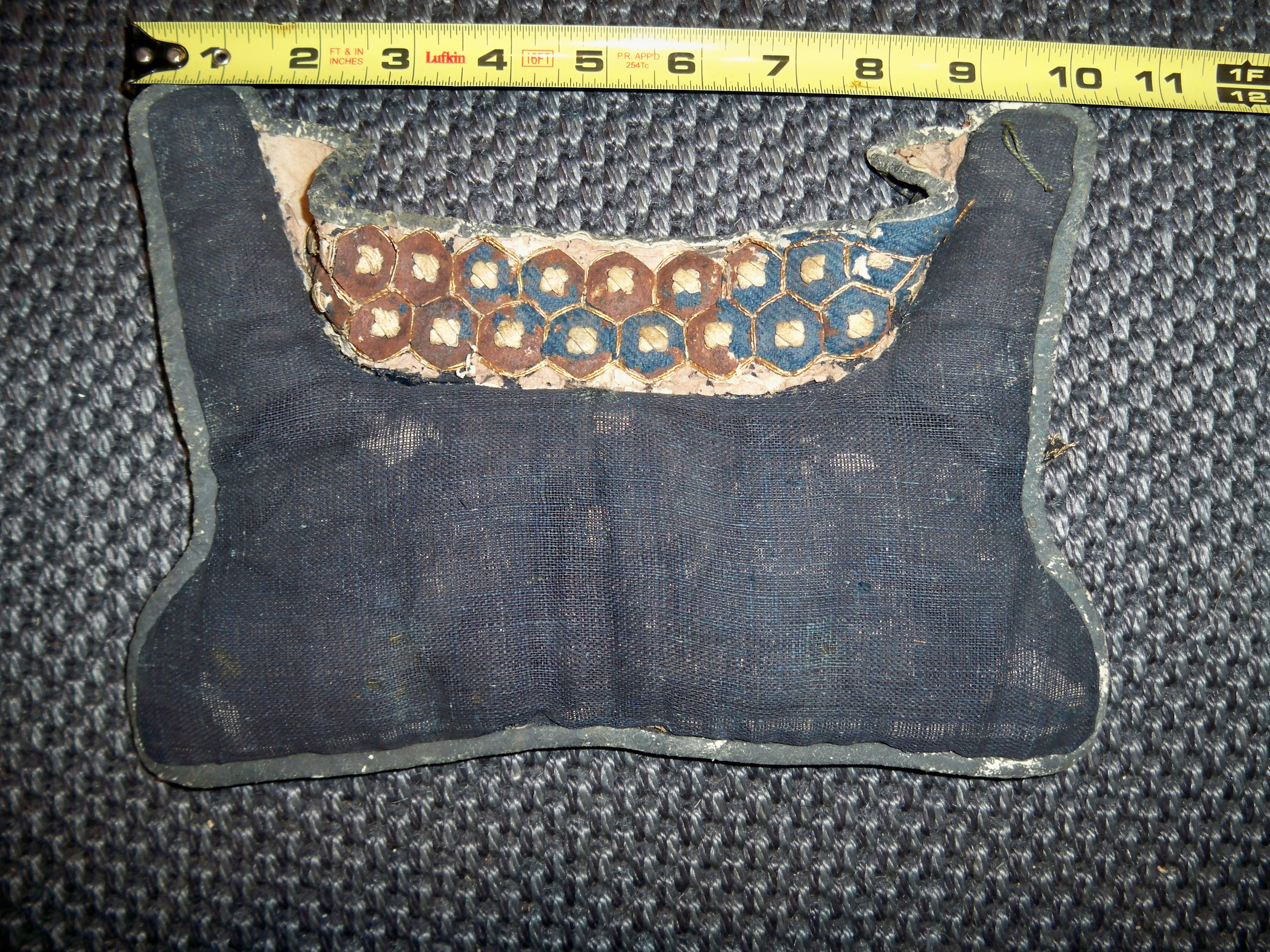
Tate-eri (shoulder pad), showing kikko plates lining the neck area

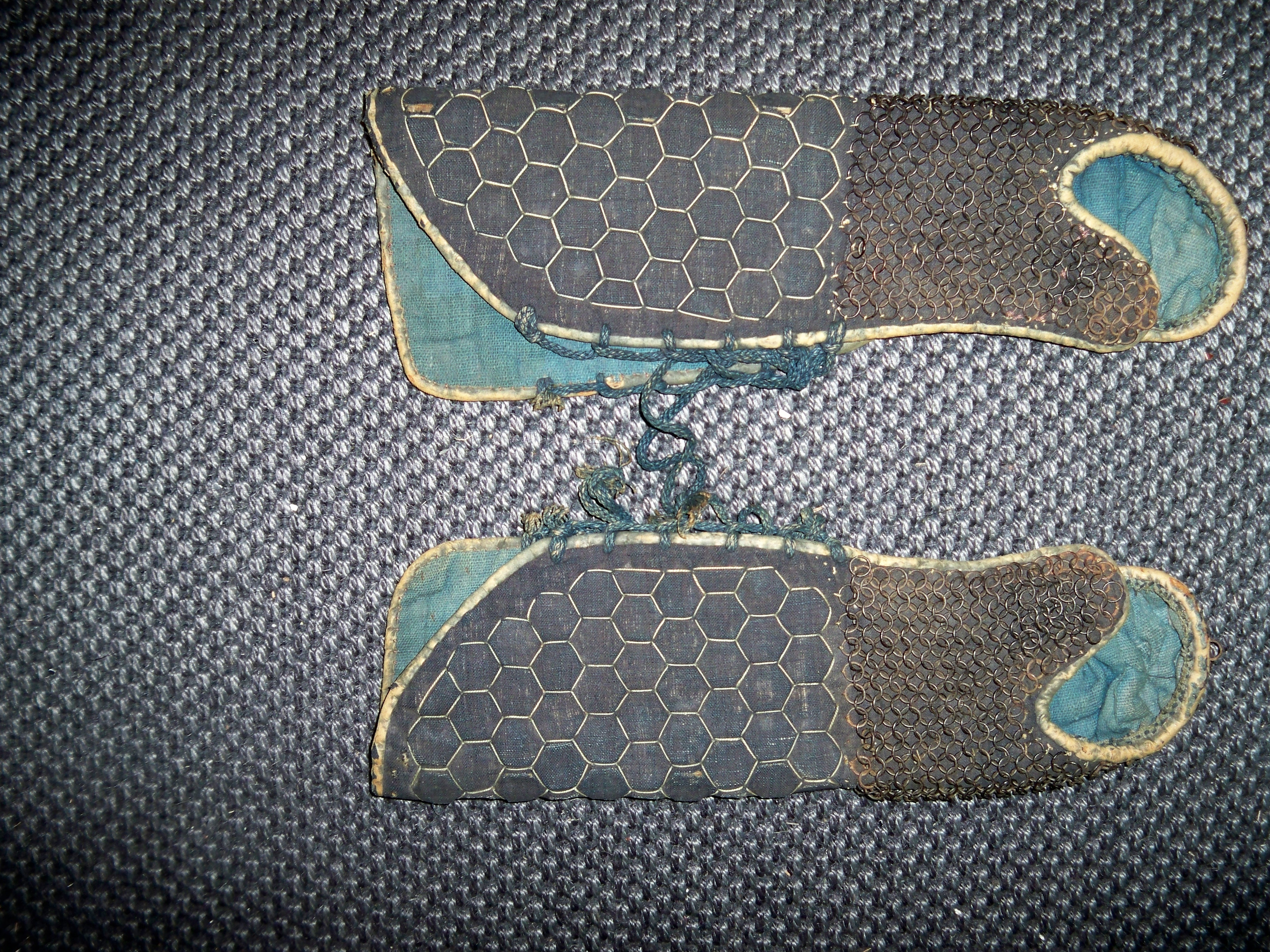
Kusari (chain mail) and kikko kote (gauntlets)

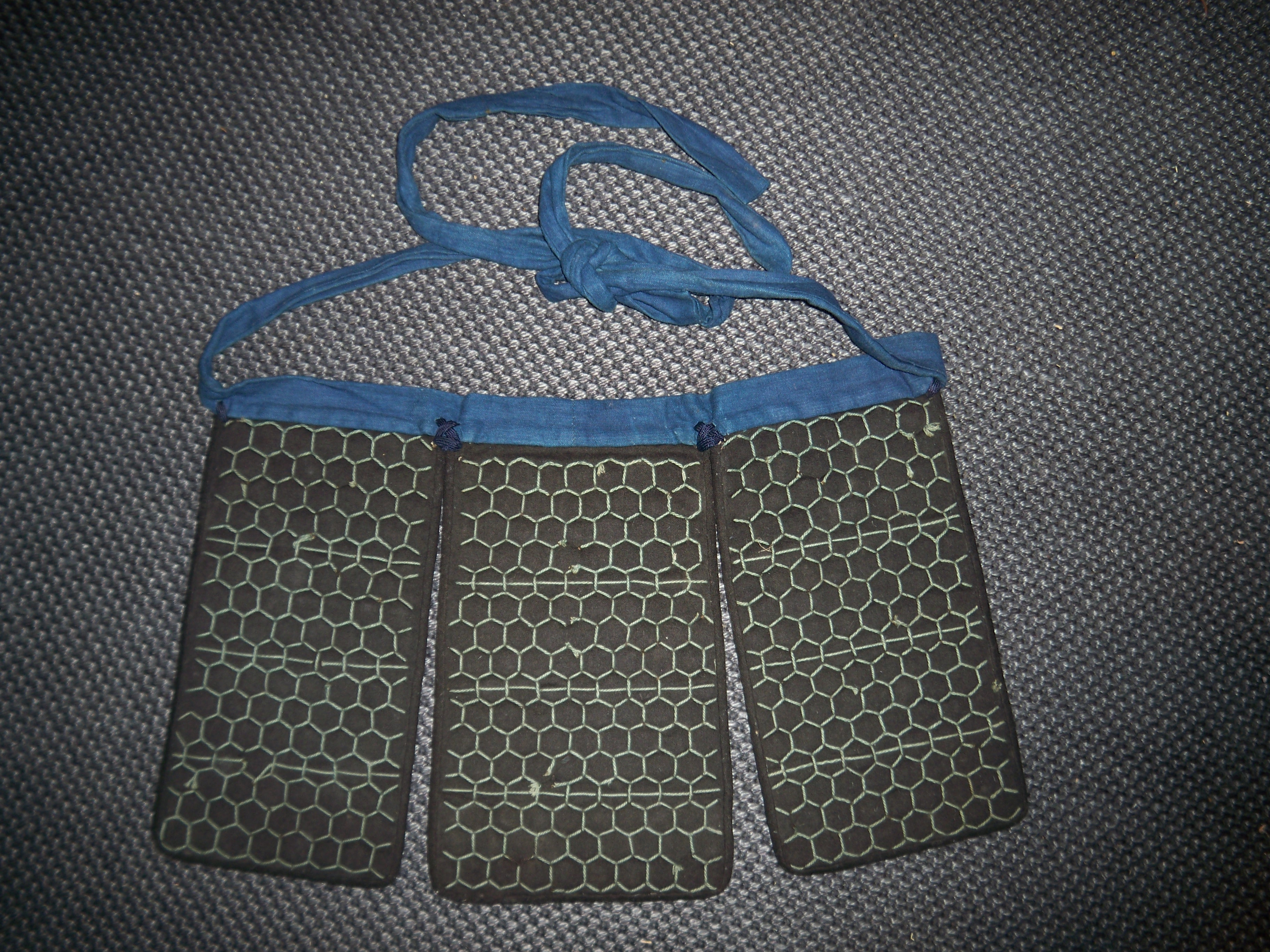
Edo period kikko haidate (thigh guards) with iron plates, sewn between two layers of cloth

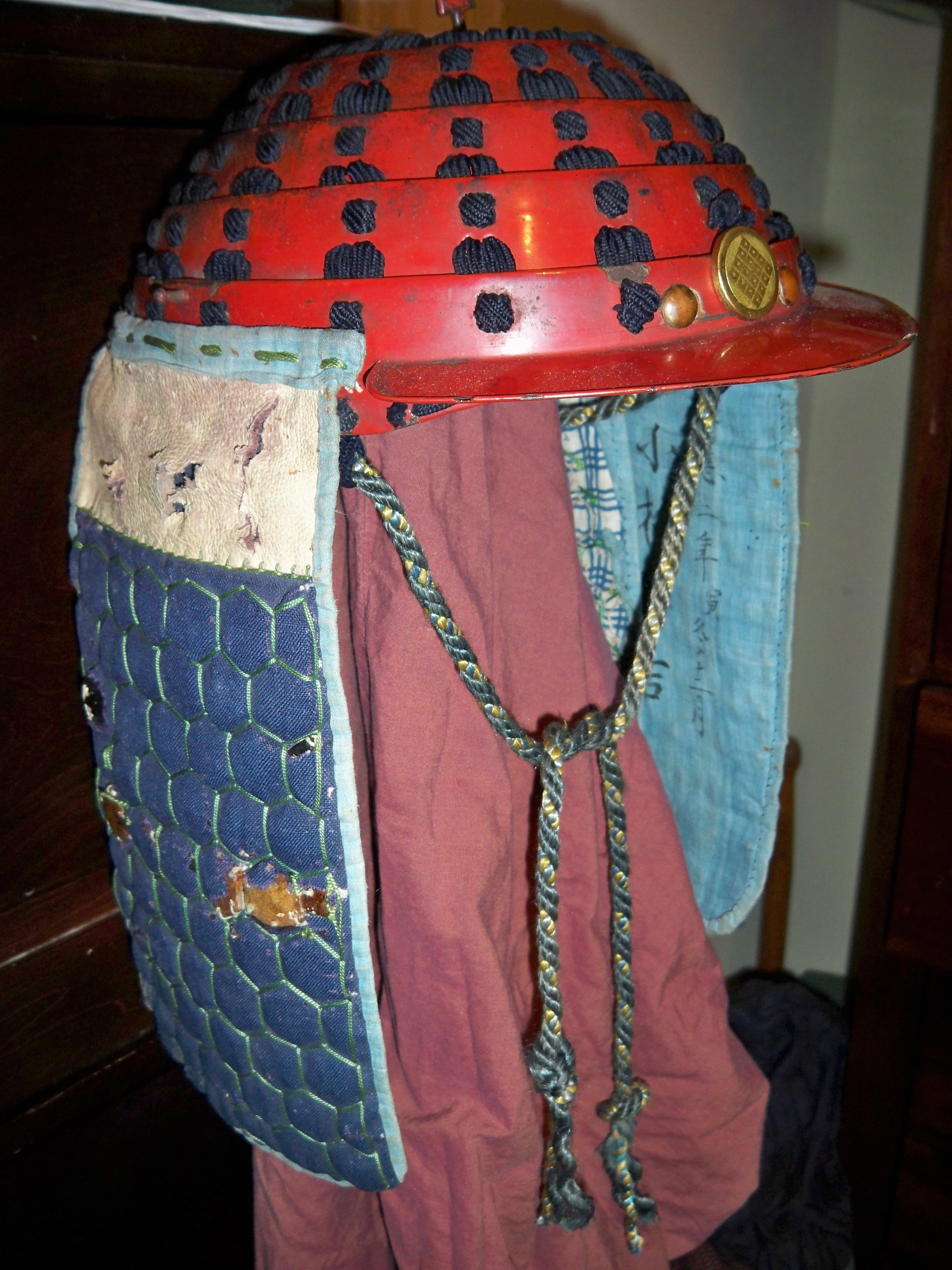
Edo period chochin kabuto (collapsible helmet) with kikko shikoro (neck guard)

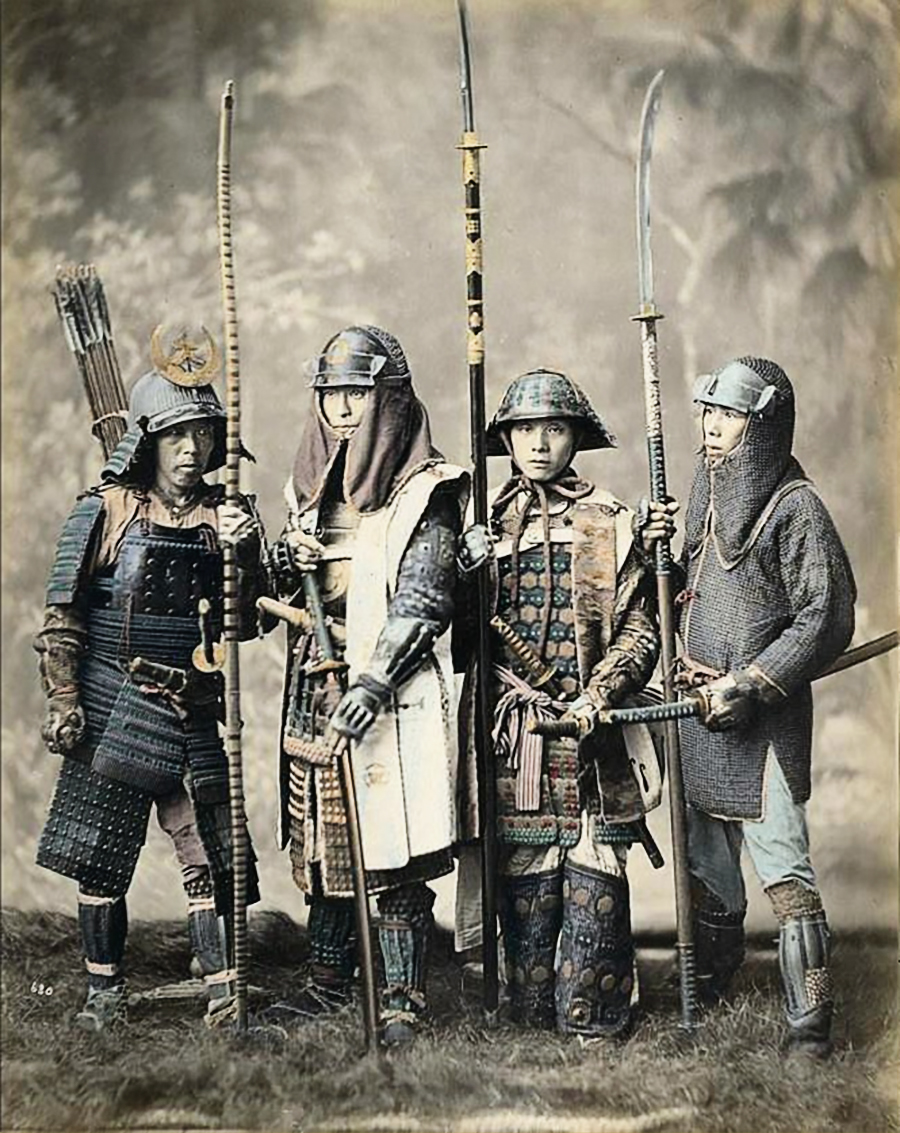
The second set of armor from the right includes kikko dou and kikko haidate (thigh guards).

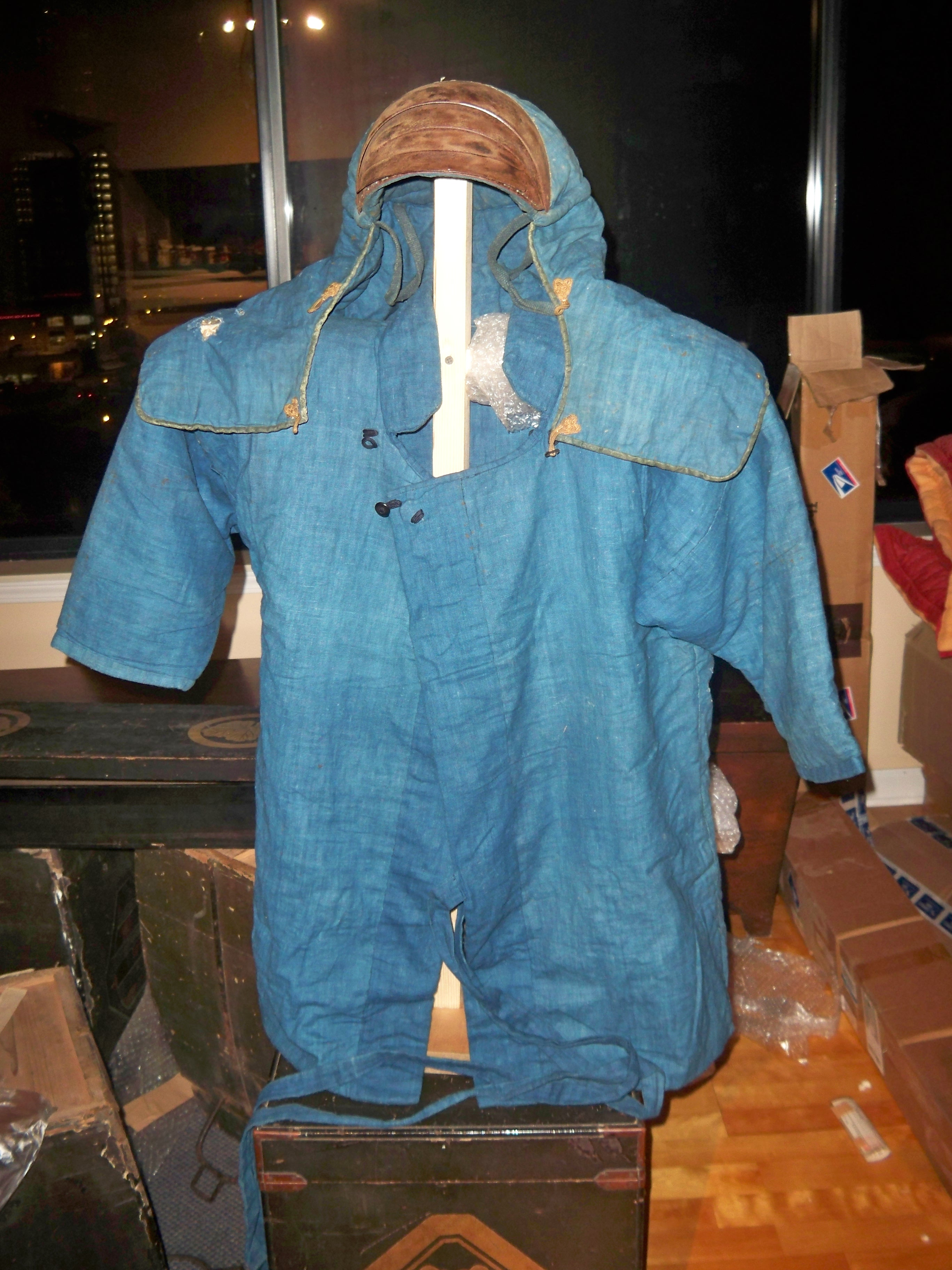
Edo period kikko katabira and hachi gane with kikko shiroko, hidden between layers of cloth. Note the tatami hitai-ate (collapsible helmet).

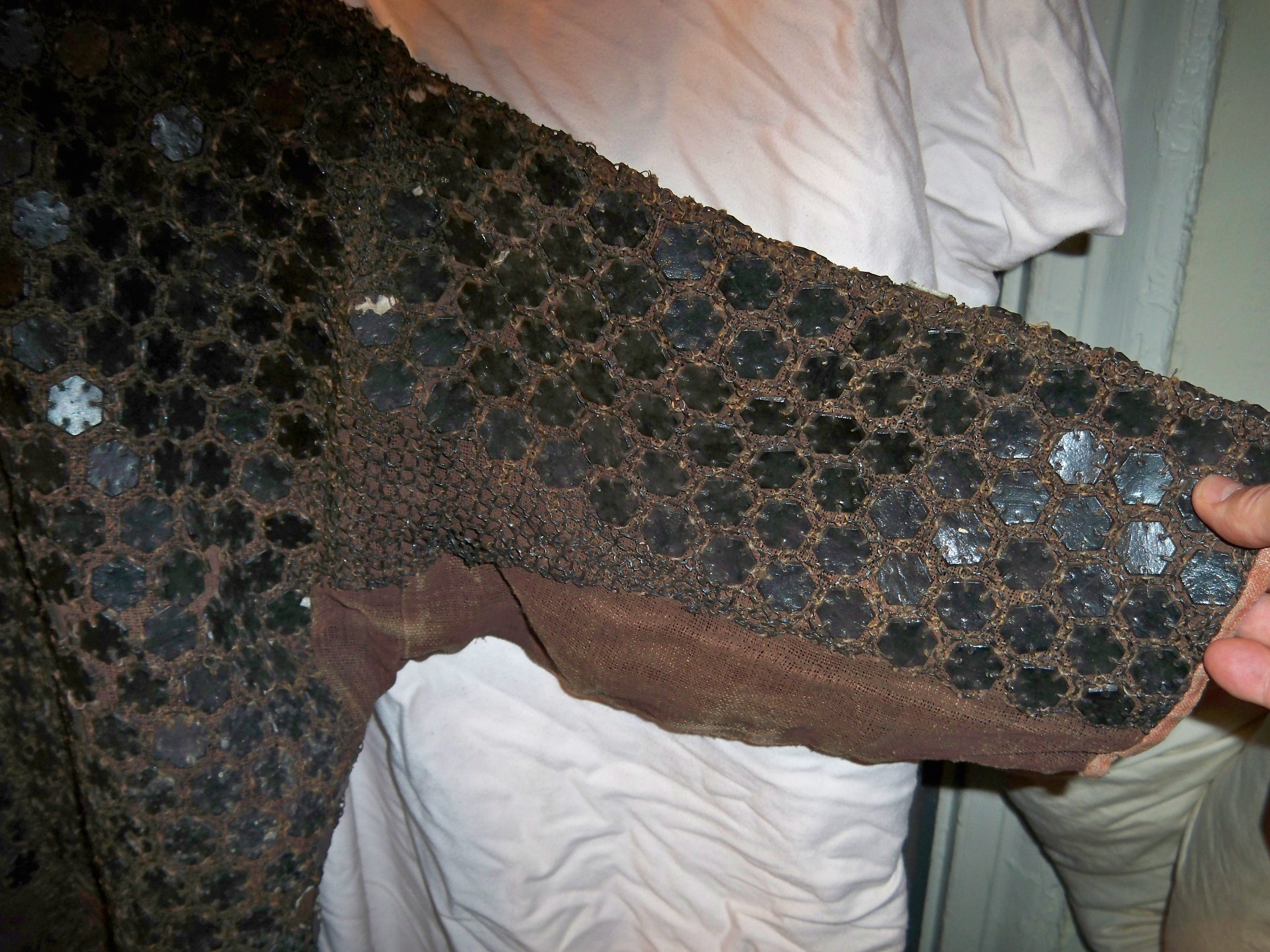
Detail of kikko armor

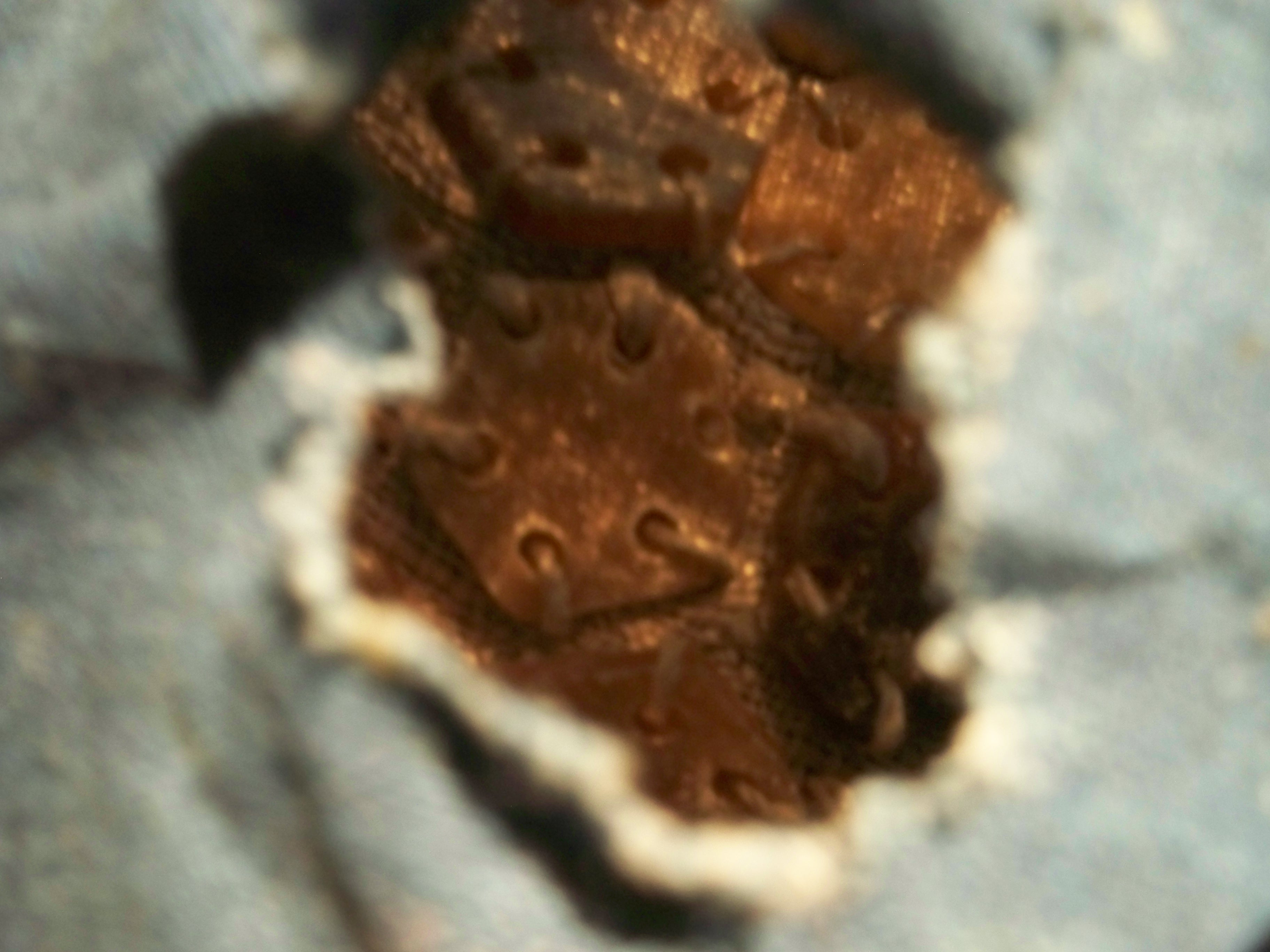
Detail of Edo period kikko katabira (jacket), where the kikko (leather or rawhide) can be seen through a hole in the covering cloth

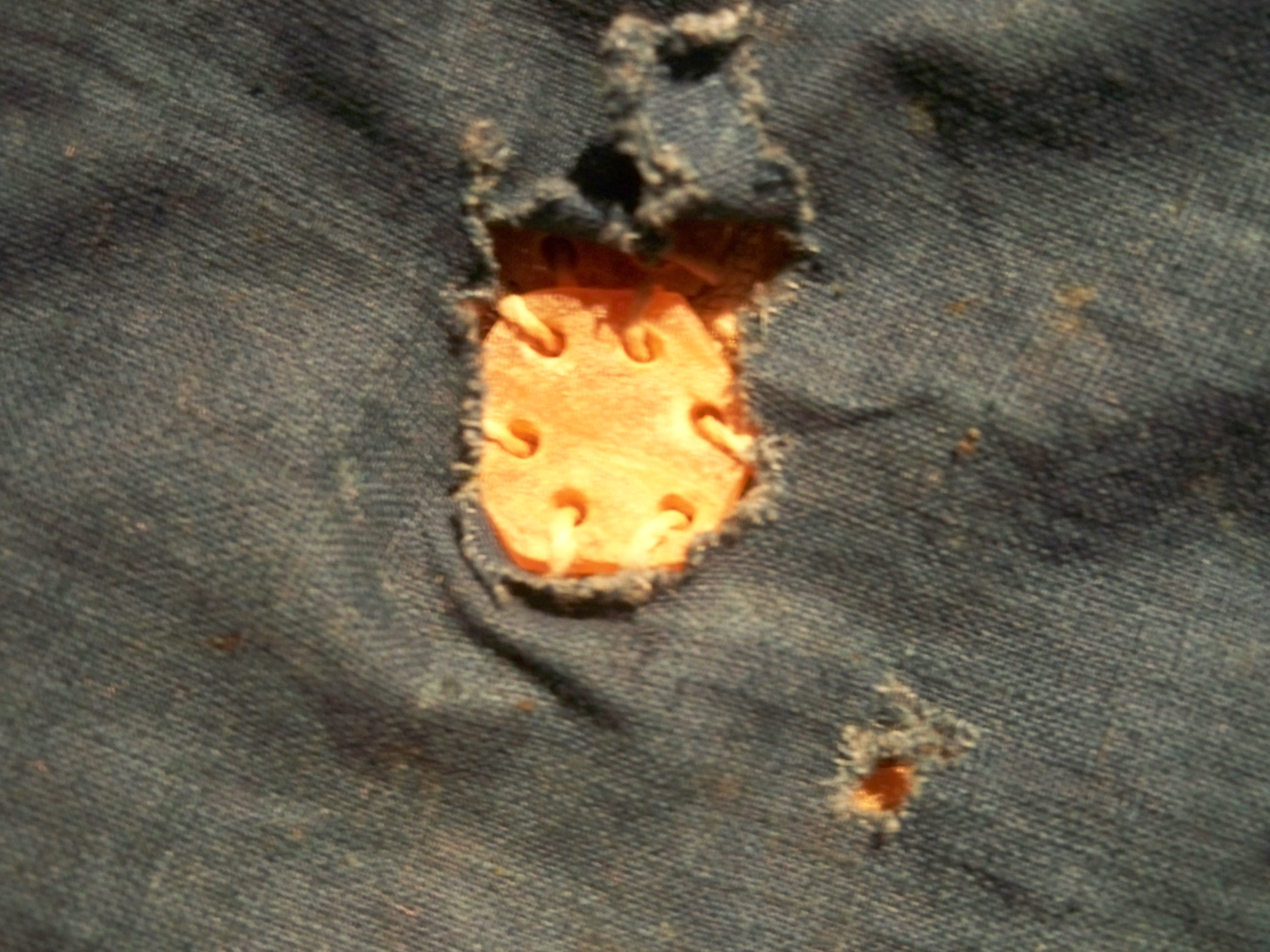
Detail of Edo period kikko katabira (jacket), where the kikko (leather or rawhide) can be seen through a hole in the covering cloth

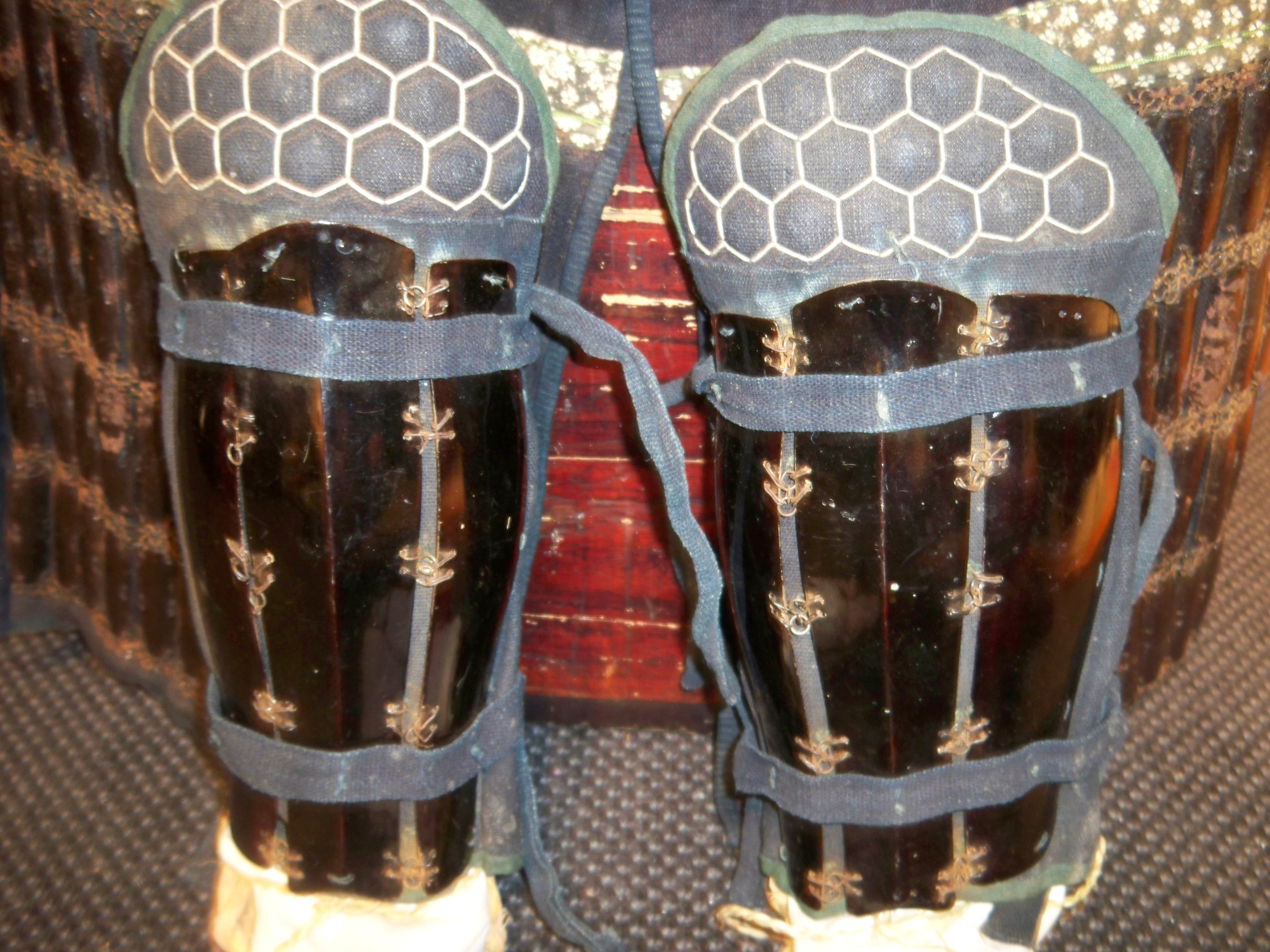
Suneate (greaves) with kikko on the knee area

== See also ==
- Tatami (Japanese armour)
- Brigandine
- Chainmail
- Plated mail
- Jack of plate
- Japanese armour
- Karuta (Japanese armour)
- Kusari (Japanese mail armour)
