= Bast shoe =

Traditional bast fiber footwear of Europe

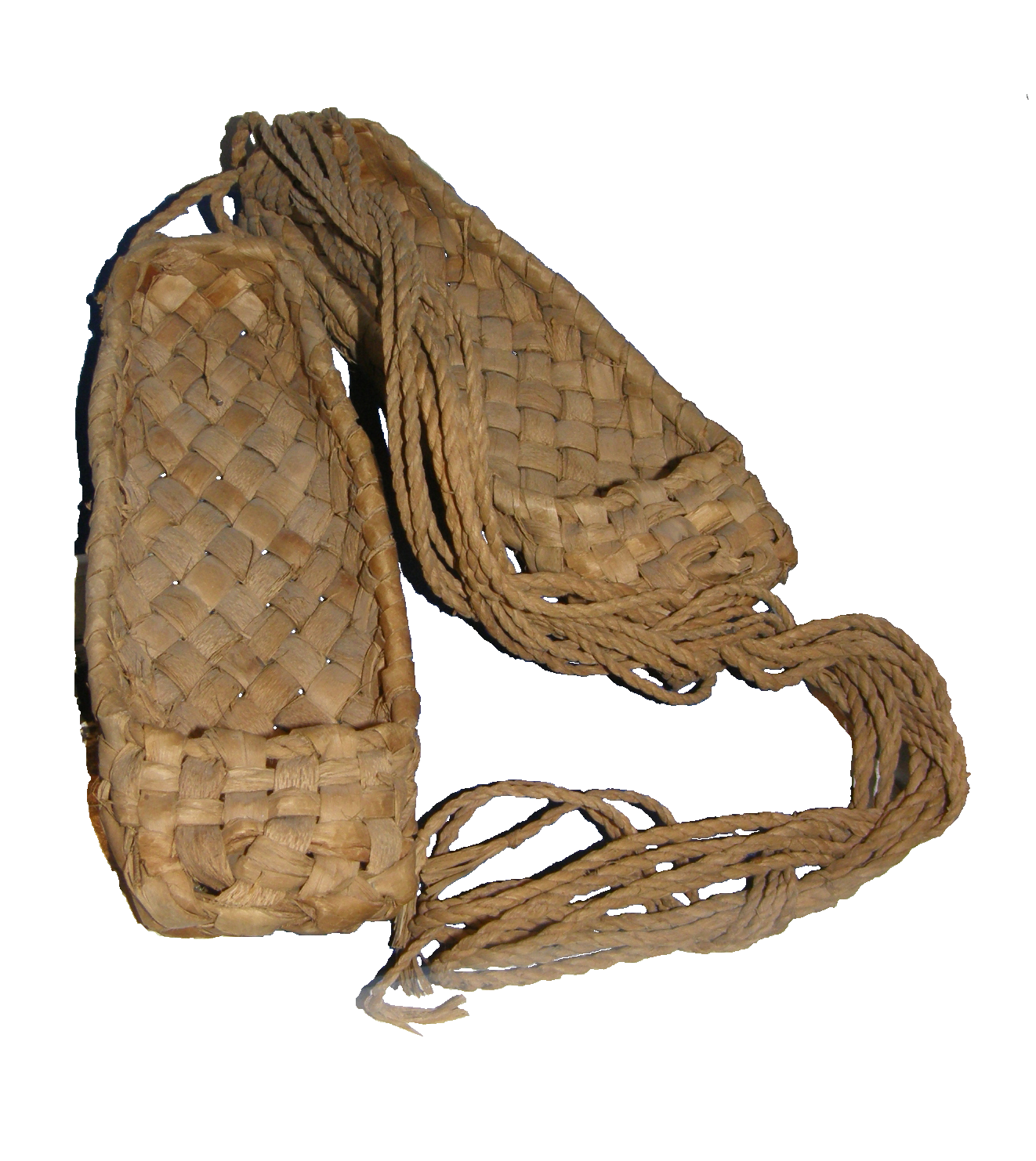
Lapti

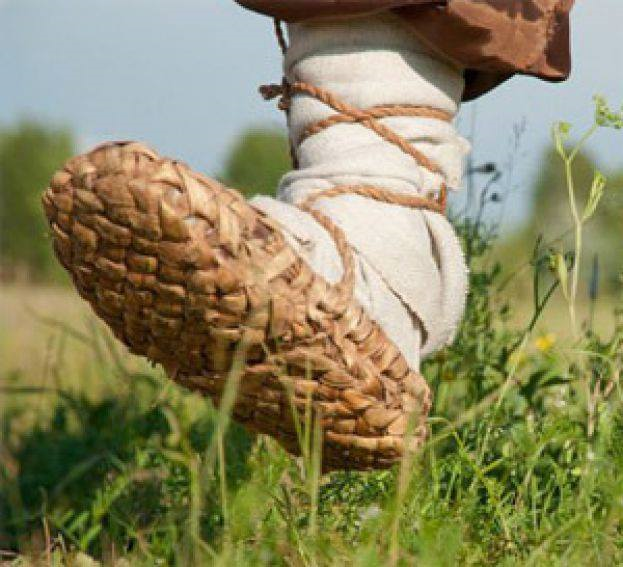
In use, from below

Bast shoes are shoes made primarily from bast—fiber taken from the bark of trees, such as linden. They are a kind of basket, woven and fitted to the shape of a foot. Bast shoes are a traditional footwear of the forest areas of Northeastern Europe, formerly worn by poorer members of the Finnic peoples, Balts, Scandinavian peoples, and East Slavs (Russians, Ukrainians, and Belarusians). They were easy to manufacture, but not durable. Similar shoes have also been made of strips of birch bark in more northern areas where linden bast is not readily available.

== History ==
Bast shoes have been worn since prehistoric times. Wooden foot-shaped blocks (lasts) for shaping them have been found in Neolithic excavations, e.g. 4900 years old. Bast shoes were still worn in the Russian countryside at the beginning of the twentieth century. Today bast shoes are sold as souvenirs and sometimes worn by ethnographic music or dance troupes as part of their costume.

In Russian, they are called lapti (лапти, sing. лапоть, lapot); this word is used as a derogatory term for cheap and short-lived footwear and, in the form lapotnik (лапотник), for an uneducated person, notionally one who is too poor to afford good shoes and wears bast shoes instead. The MiG-105 "Spiral" spaceplane was nicknamed Lapot for the shape of its nose resembling a shoe.

Bast shoes played an important role in the founding myth of the Přemyslid dynasty, which reigned in Bohemia and Moravia until 1306 AD. Přemysl the Ploughman, its legendary ancestor, was a peasant of humble origin. His bast shoes and bast-bag were kept as relics at Vyšehrad and Czech kings put them on during their coronations. The relics were probably destroyed when Vyšehrad fell to the Hussites in 1420.

== Gallery ==
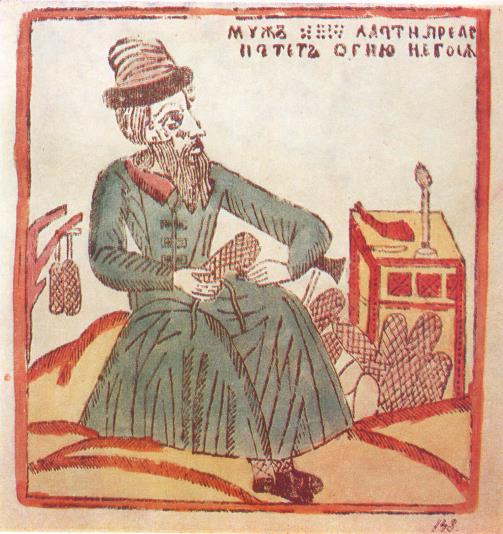
Lubok depicting a peasant making lapti (Russian bast shoes).

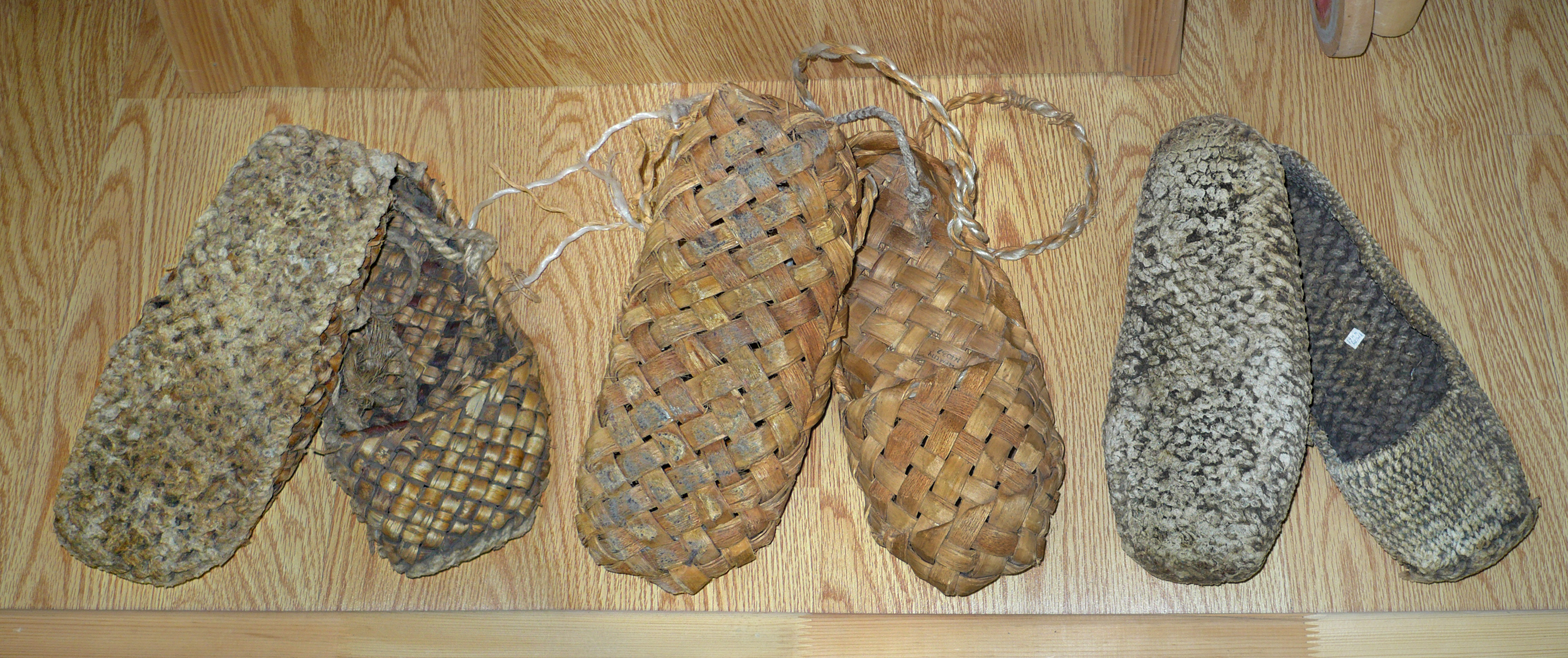
Three types of lapti

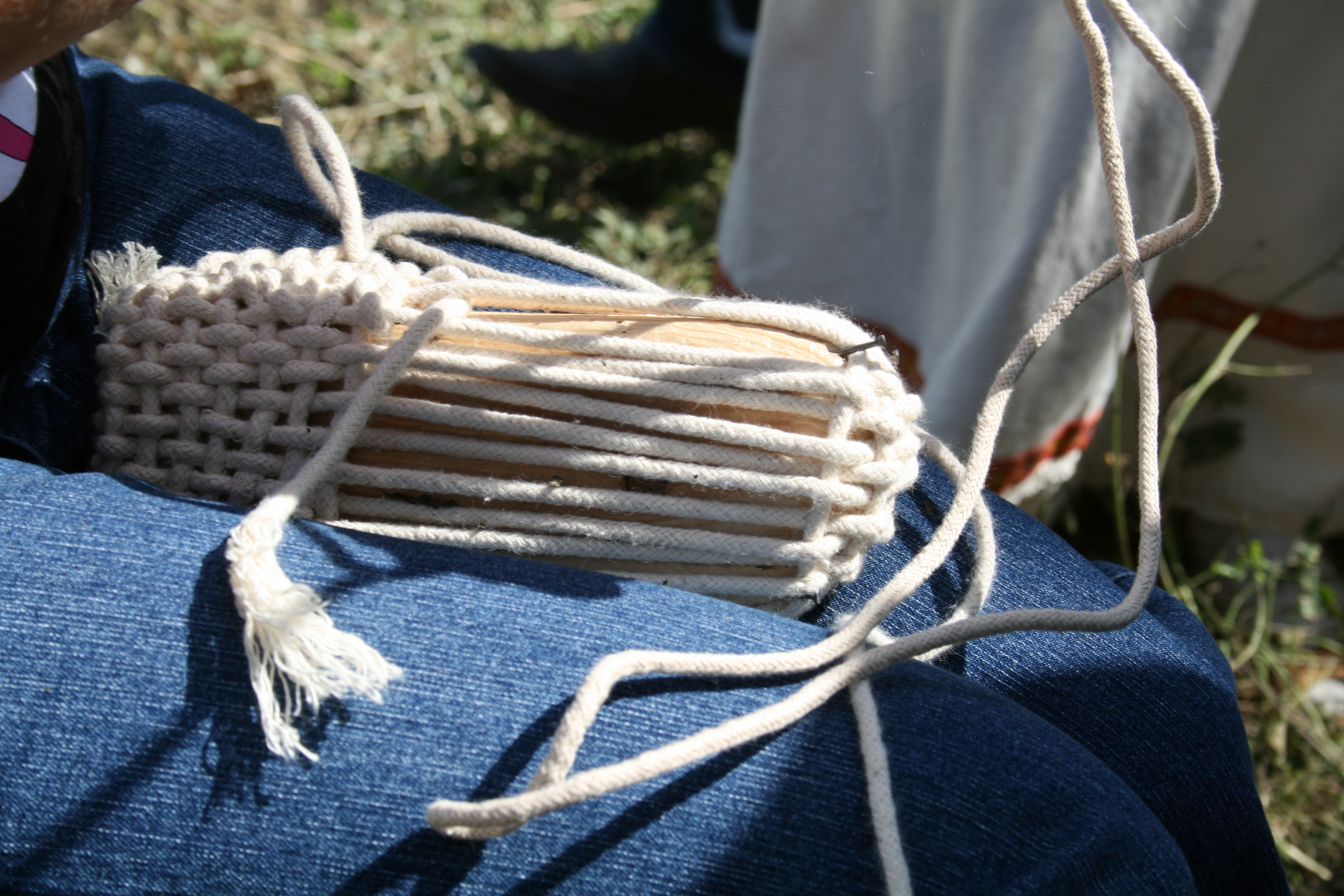
A lesson of (simplified) lapti-making

== See also ==
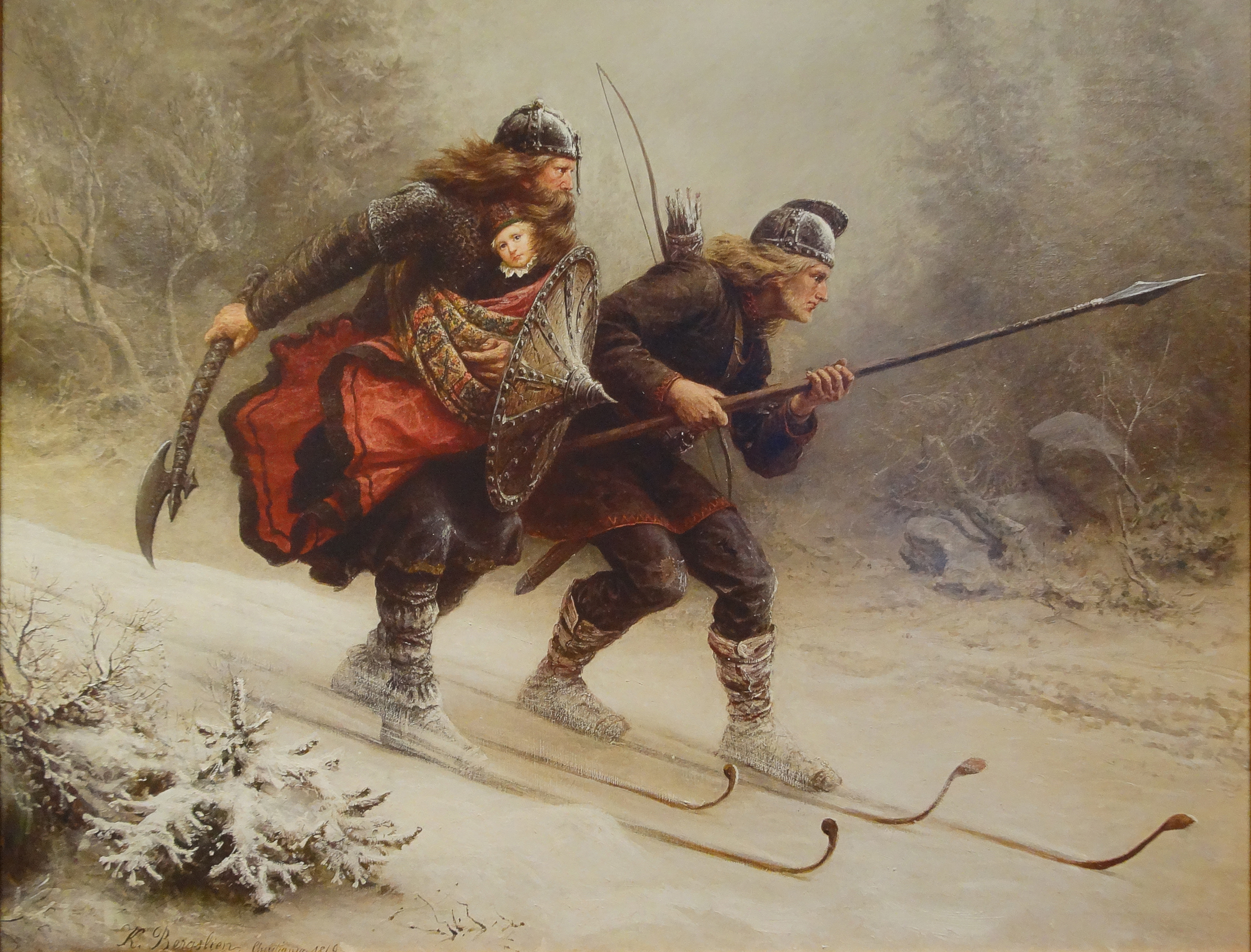
Birkebeiner wearing birch bark shoes and birch bark leg wraps

- Birkebeiner
- Espadrille, similar footwear in Iberian culture of identical etymological derivation (from esparto vegetable fibre used in their manufacture)
- List of shoe styles
- Jipsin, similar Korean shoes
- Rope-soled shoe
- Waraji, similar Japanese footwear
