= Waraji =

Tie-on Japanese straw sandals

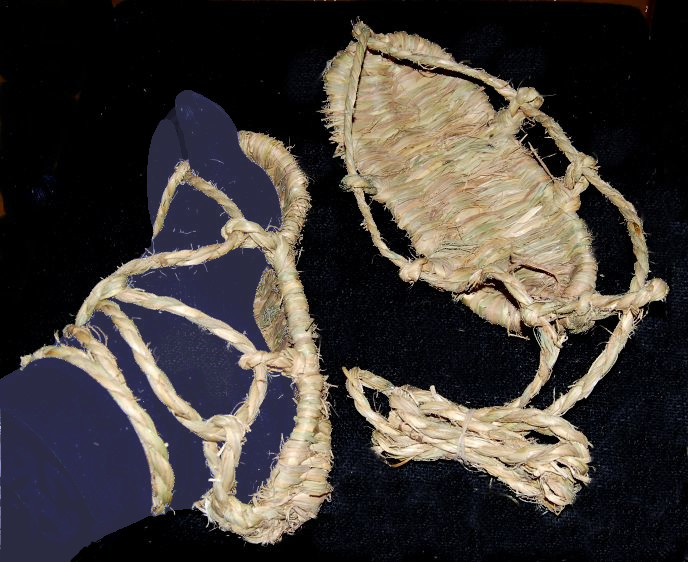
Waraji over indigo-blue tabi, the sock colour digitally altered for clarity

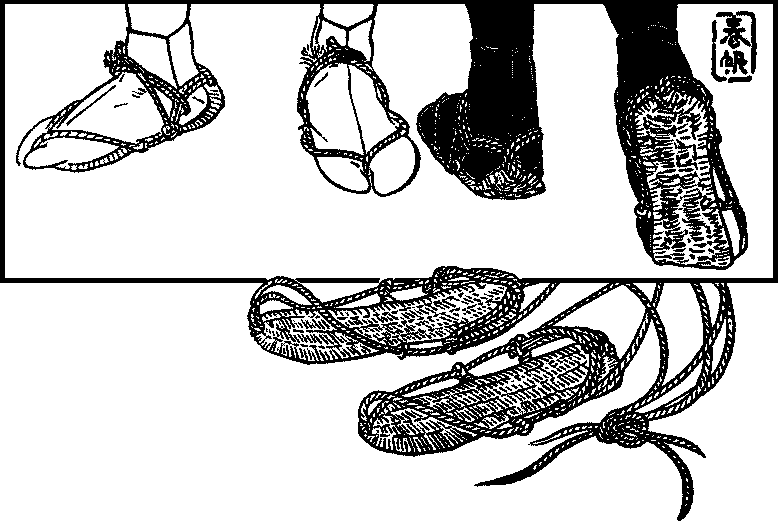

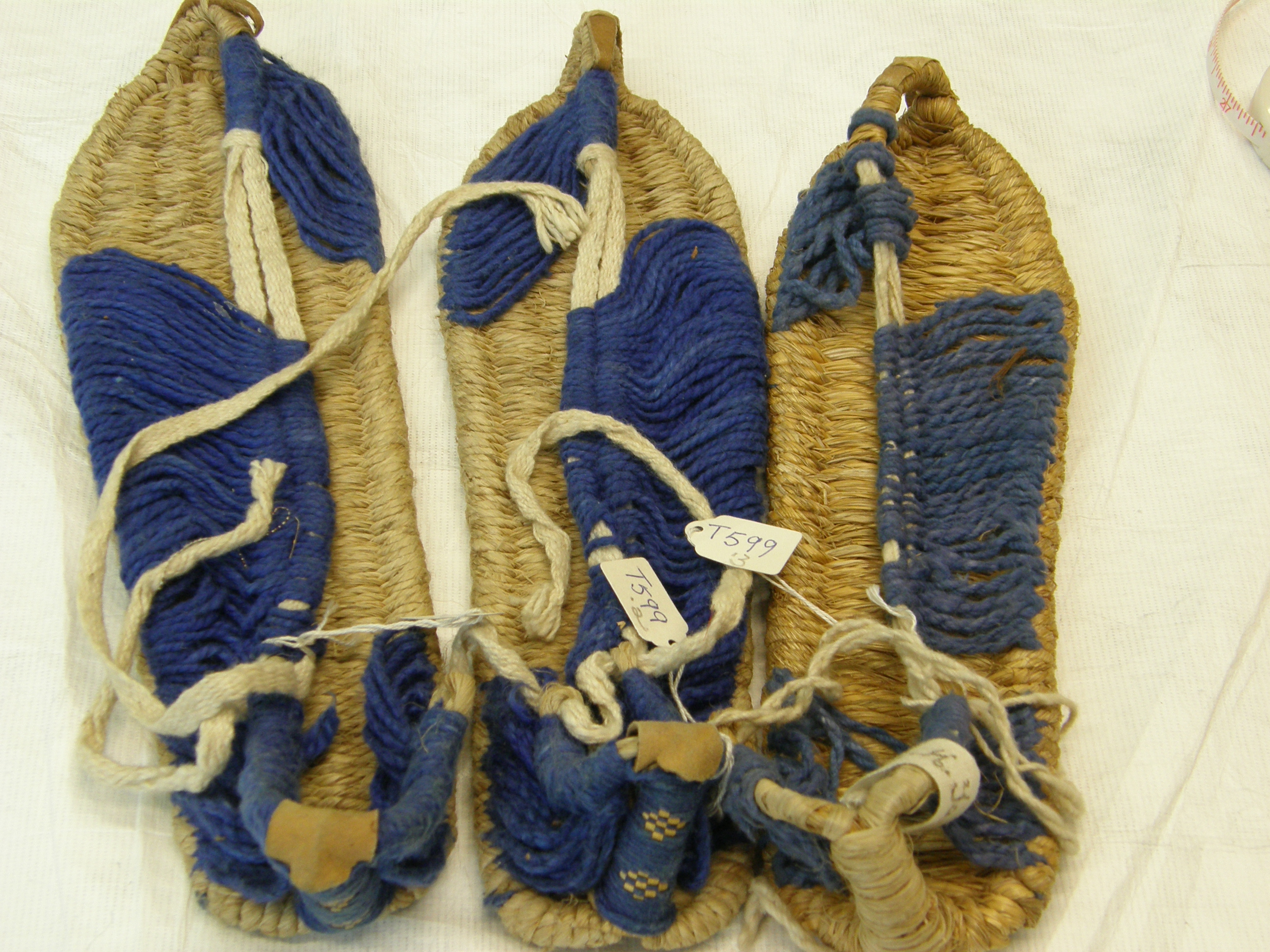
Similar four- and six-warp Chinese sandals, c. 1930 (other views)

Waraji (草鞋) (Japanese pronunciation: [w̜aɺadʑi]) are light tie-on sandals, made from ropemaking fibers (usually straw), that were the standard footwear of the common people in Japan.

== Use ==
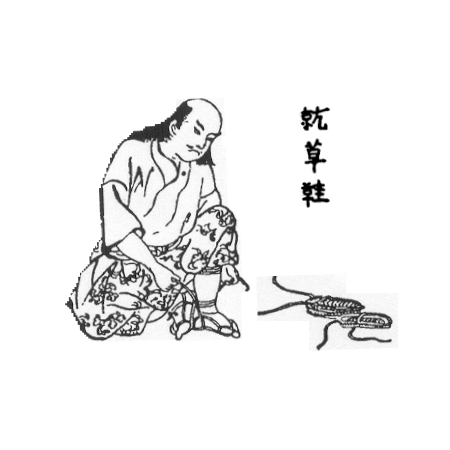
Samurai donning waraji

Waraji resemble other forms of traditional Japanese footwear, such as zori and geta, with a few key differences. They were historically the simplest form of outdoor footwear (sandals of any type were not worn indoors). Waraji, due to their cheap and rustic nature, are considered to be a very informal type of footwear, and are not worn with formal kimono. They are typically worn with tabi socks, and are woven so that the wearer's toes generally protrude slightly over the edge of the shoe.

Waraji were once common footwear in Japan. There are records of waraji in the Heian period (794–1185 CE), with the possibility of waraji having existed before this time. In the Edo period (1603–1867 CE), geta were worn in cities, but anyone making a long journey wore waraji. They were also worn for energetic or prolonged labour. Their light weight and grip were valued.

In modern-day Japan, waraji are worn by Buddhist monks, and by some fishers of mountain streams. Zori and geta are worn far more commonly by the general population.

== Construction ==
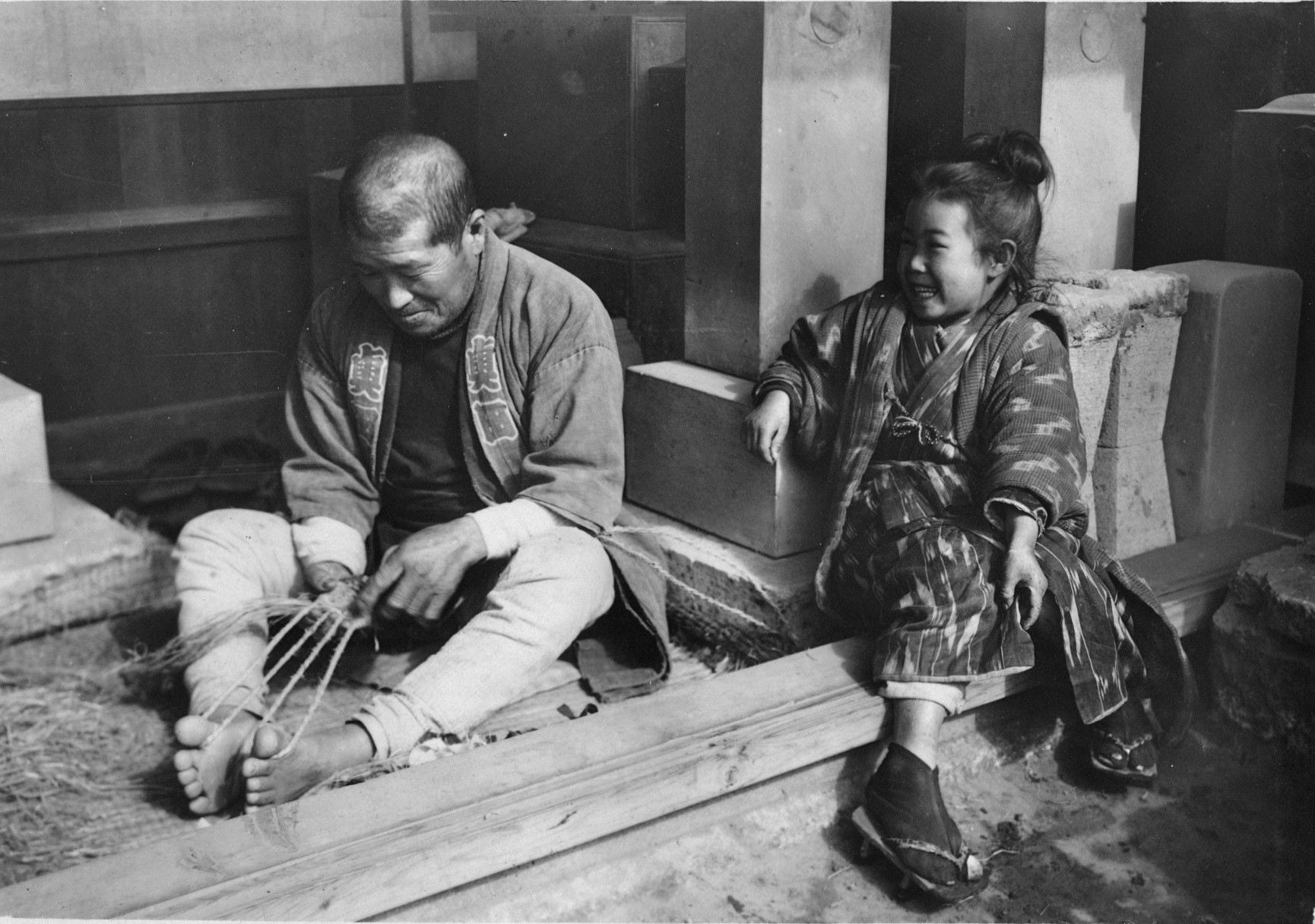
Waraji were traditionally made in the home, as shown here (September 1914). Note twine warp, held between hands and toes, and loose-fiber weft, to his right.

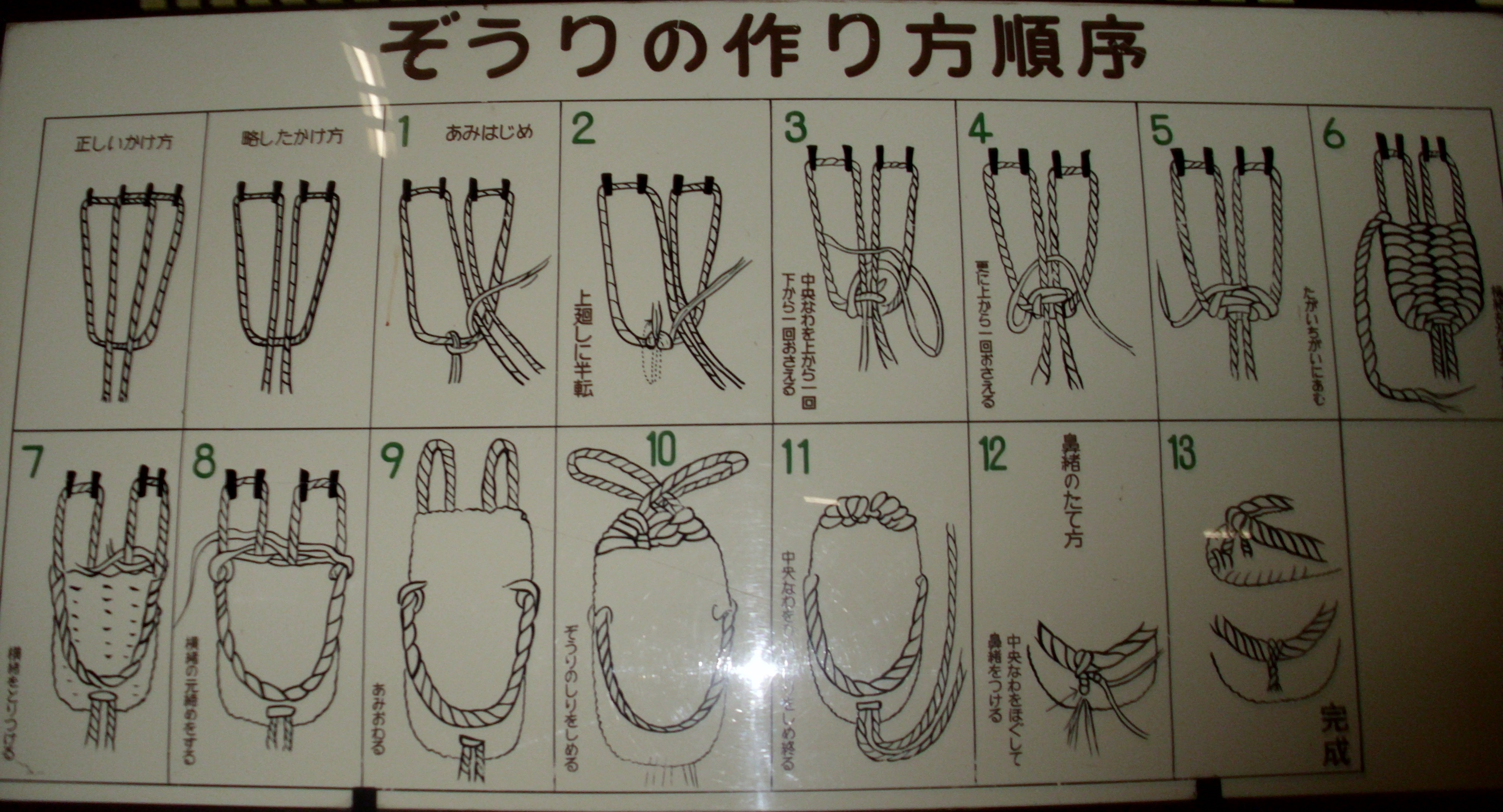
Pictorial instructions on how to weave zōri (similar to waraji) in Hida Minzoku Mura Folk Village; most Japanese no longer regularly make waraji.

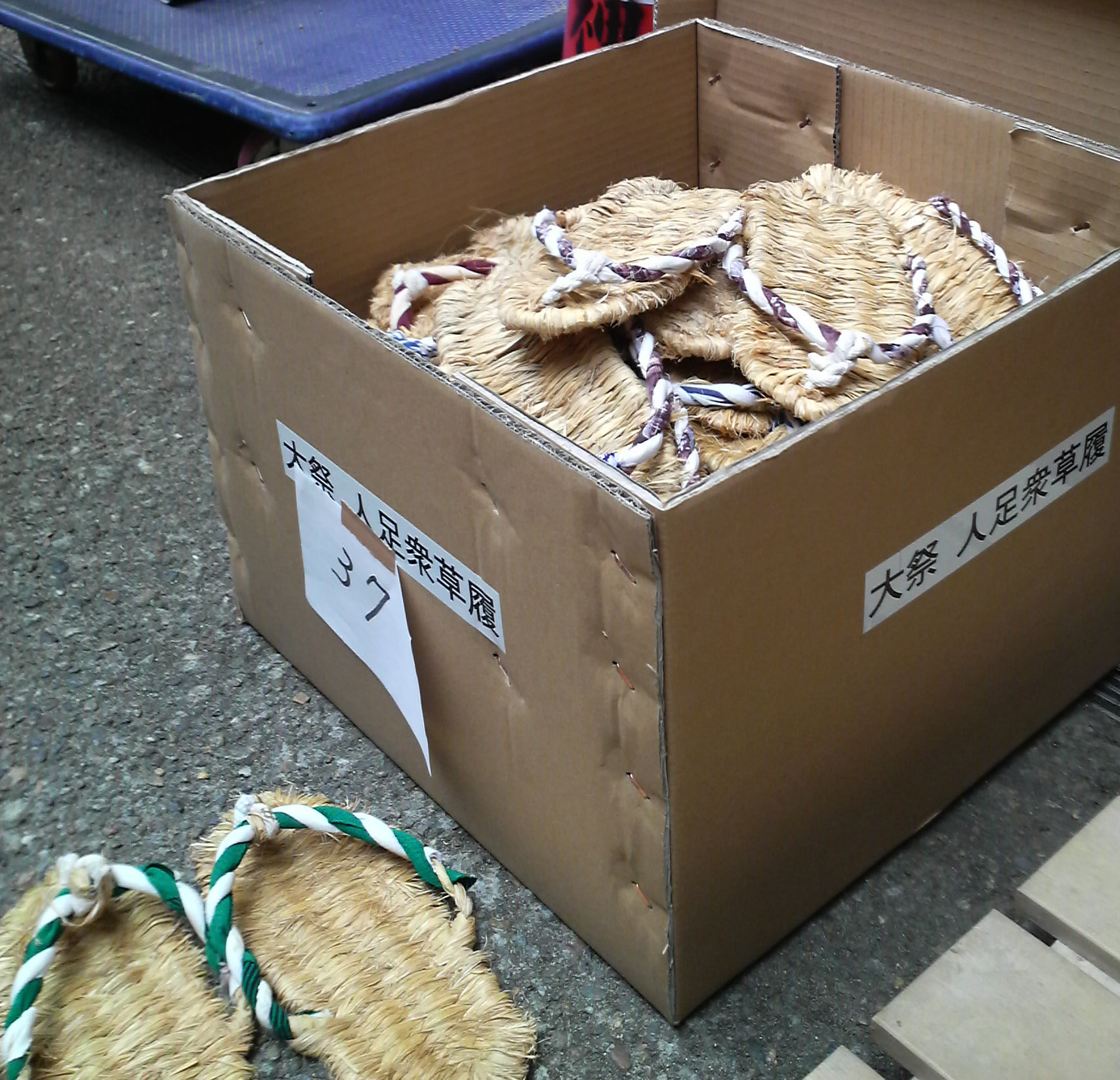
These rough festival zōri were made like the instructions, but the straps were wrapped in fabric before they are twisted together. (Note: The cloth-wrapped straps make them fuku-zōri (服草履(ふくぞうり), cloth zori))

In constant use, rice-straw waraji only last three or four days, or roughly 24 hours of active use and so people would have to make about a hundred pairs a year, on average, if they wore them constantly. As waraji could be homemade from cheap materials, and many people learned how to make them in childhood, that was not a problem. Waraji could also be cheaply bought. Travellers carried a supply and discarded them when they were worn out.

== Materials ==
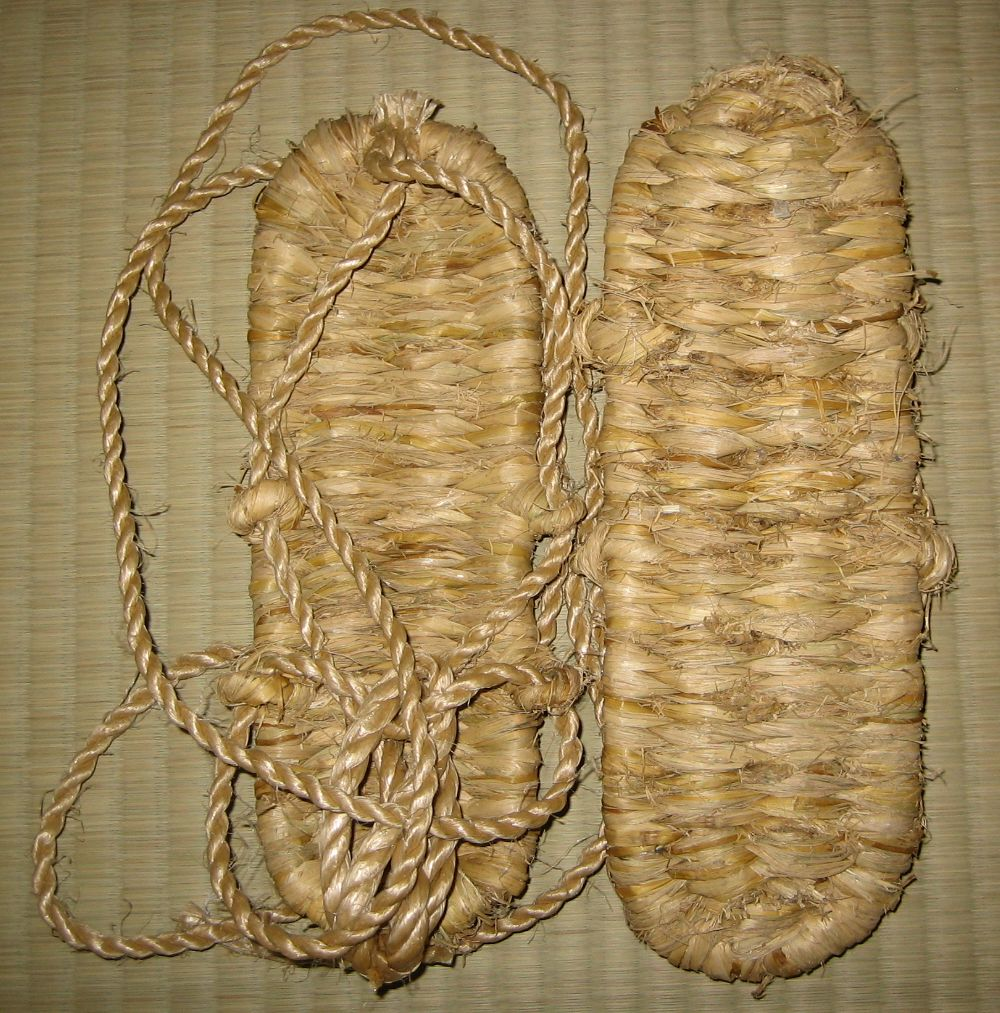
Waraji woven entirely from rice straw (somewhat finer straw, and more tightly packed, than the festival zori above)

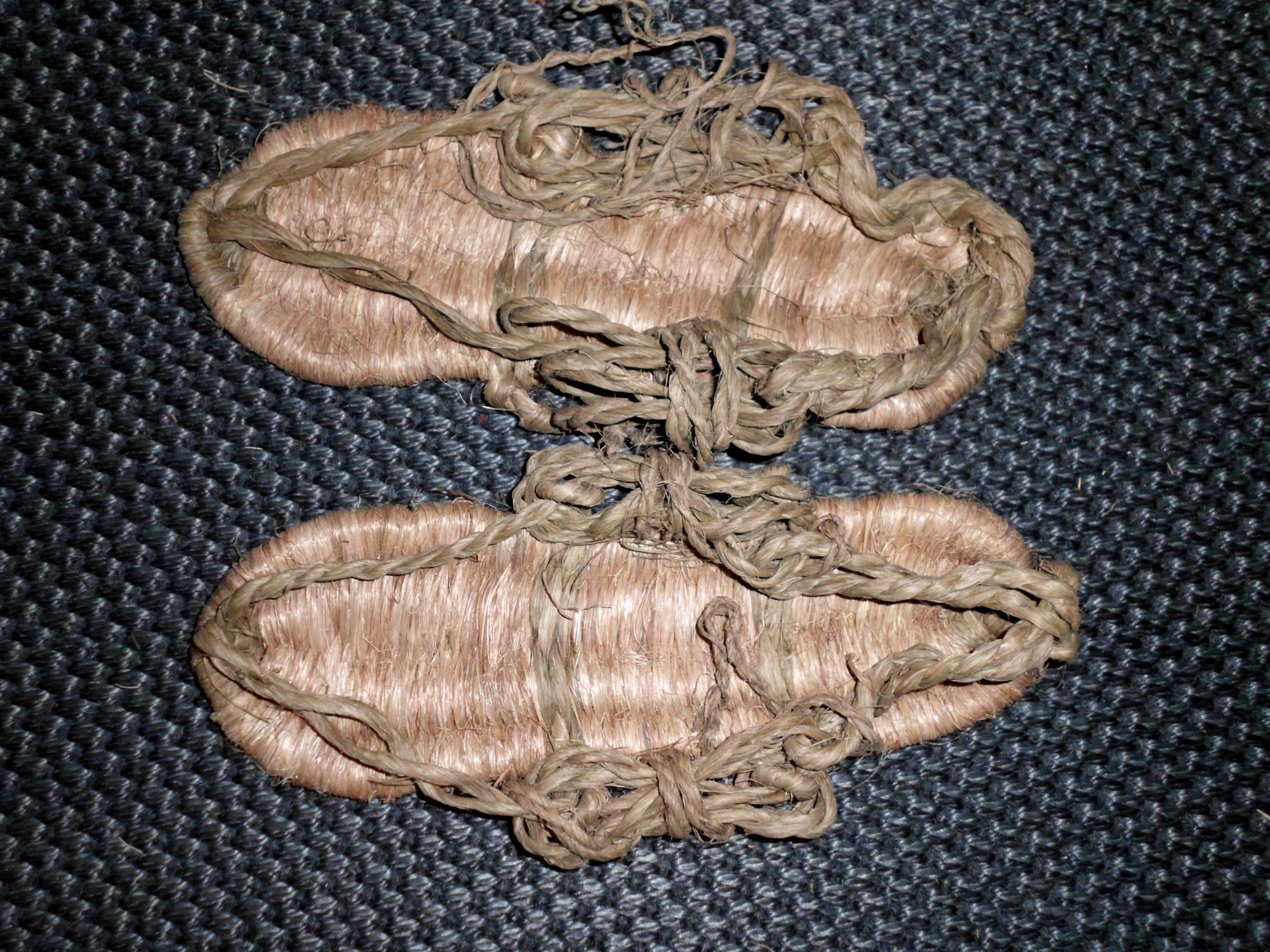
Waraji with two different-coloured fibers for the warp and weft. Side loops are made from the outer warps of the opposite side; each is woven as a weft across, made into a side loop, and woven back again, trapping the loop

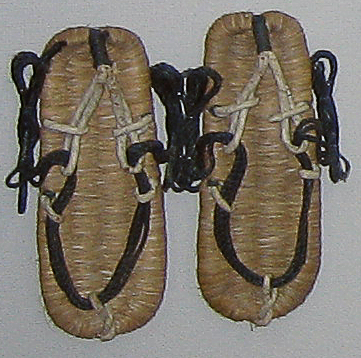
Finely-woven waraji from a museum exhibit at the Ninja Museum of Igaryu, showing multiple fibers, indigo dye, and loops secured with whipping

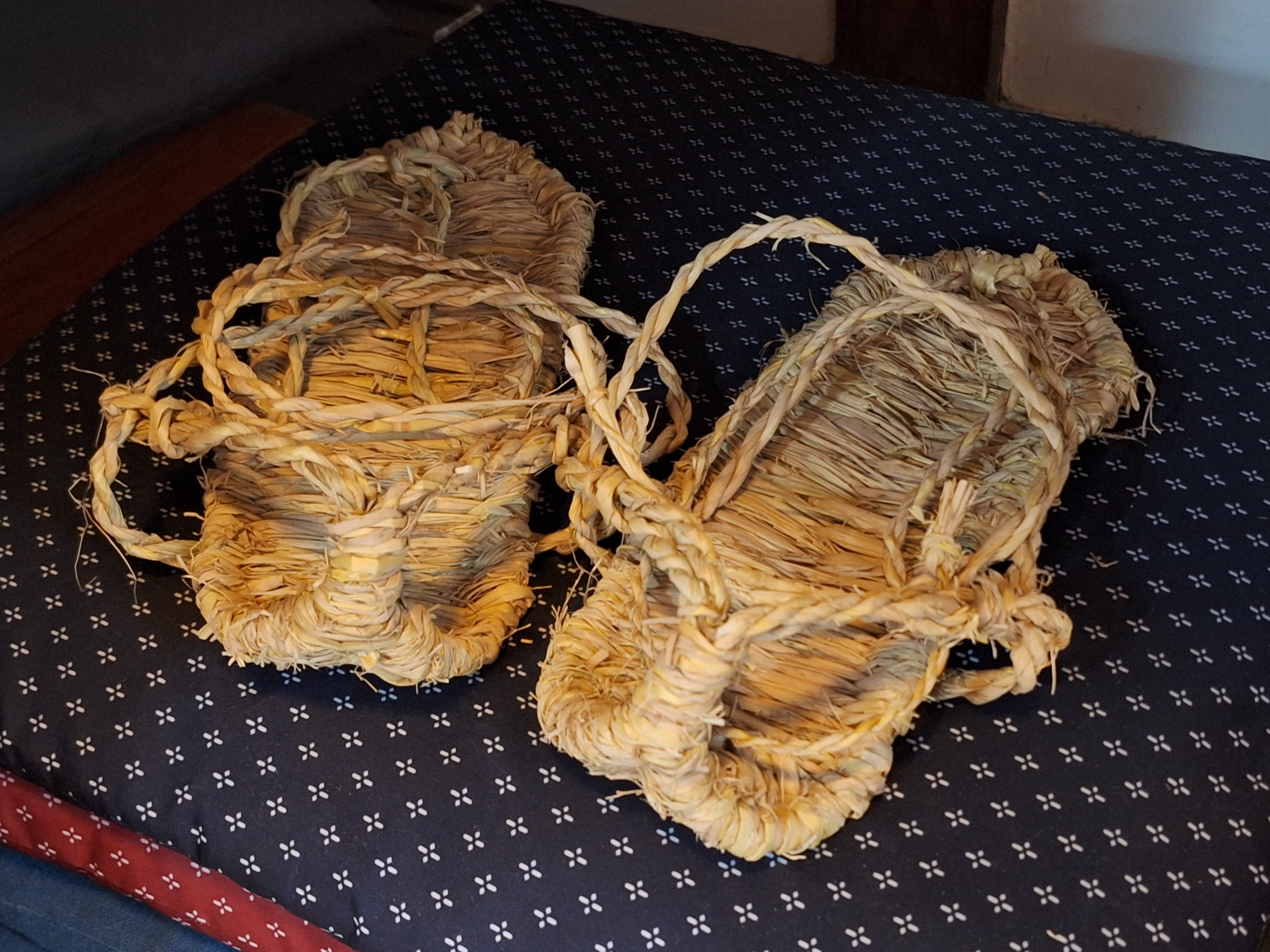
From the heel end.

Rice straw is the common and traditional material for weaving waraji. Long straw (not broken by the processing methods) must be beaten to soften the fibers before use. Most other ropemaking fibers can also be used, such as cotton, hemp, palm fibers, or even strips of rag. The straps of the waraji might be covered, often with paper. Cardboard soles are used on some modern commercial designs.

=== Tying ===
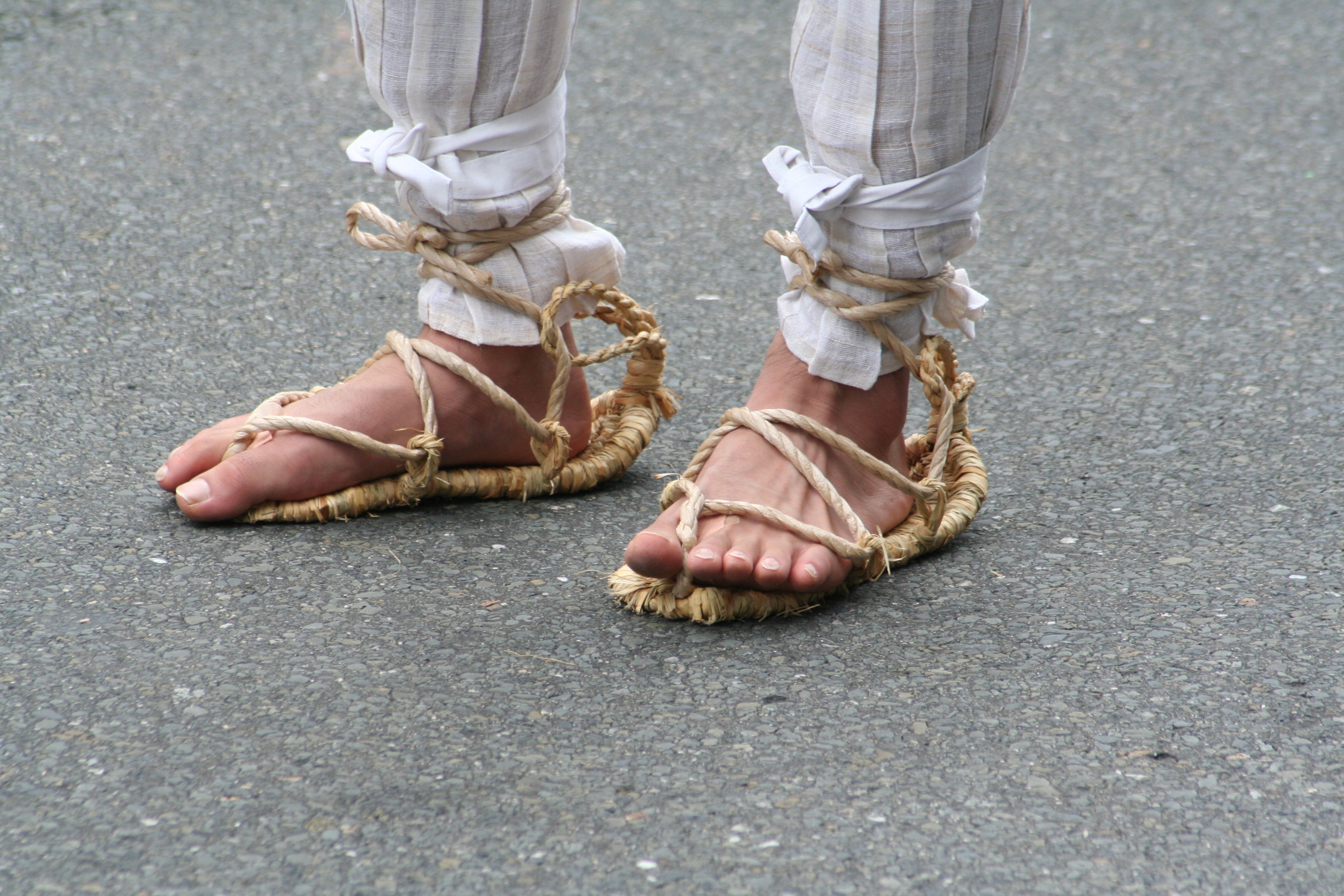
These waraji are made as in the instructions above, but two small loops are woven on each side (instead of one big foot-crossing loop), and the leftover-warp loops at the heel are retained. A separate rope is then woven through these loops to attach the waraji to the foot.

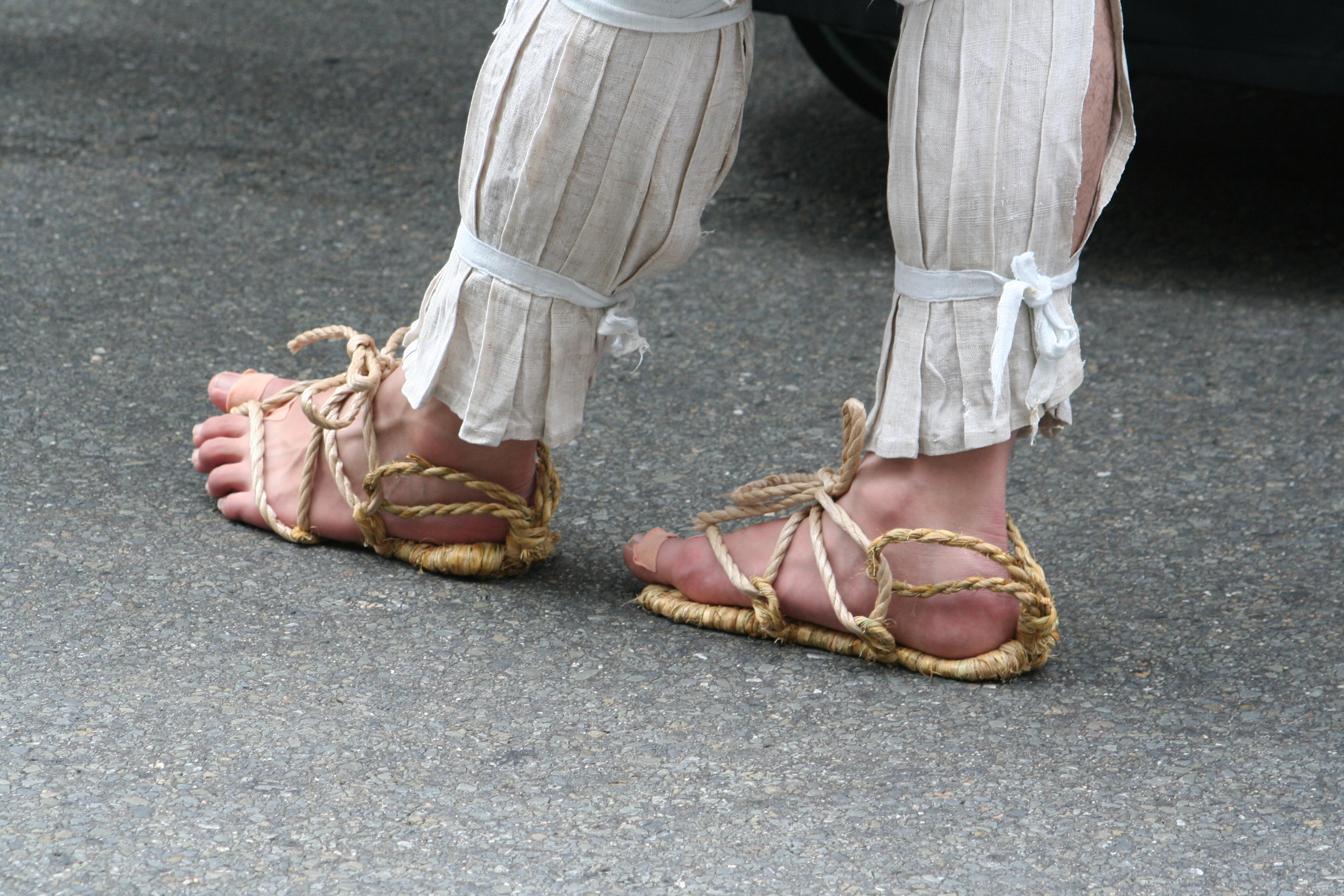
A method of tying the waraji without a fastening around the ankle (Gion Matsuri, 2009)

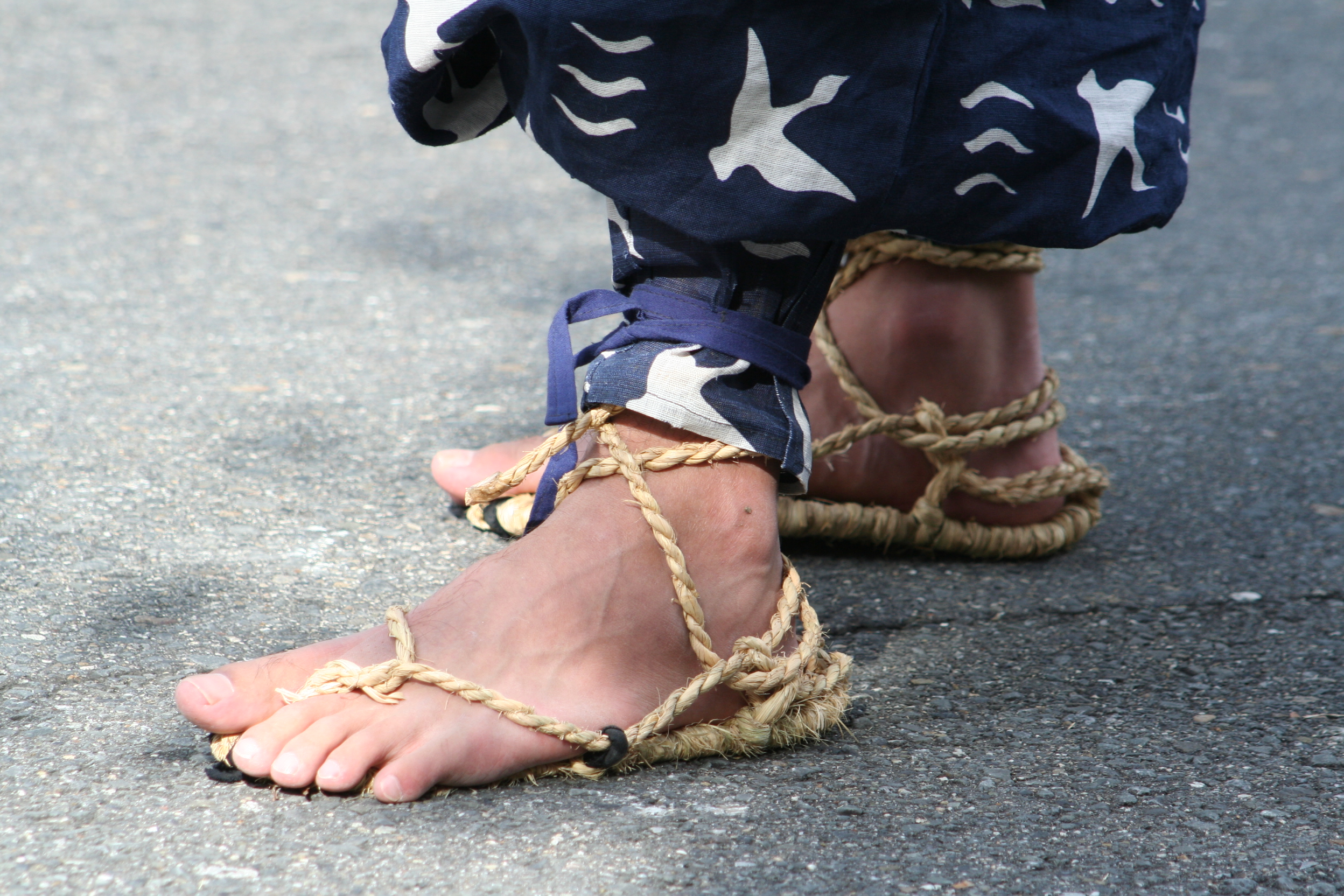
Another more complex tying variation; the leftover heel loops are drawn through the rear set of side loops, with a separate piece of rope threaded between them. (Jidai Matsuri, 2009)

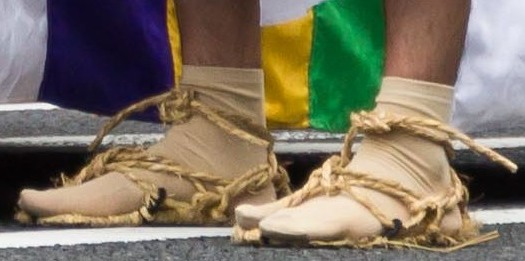
Another tying variation, worn over tabi

There are a number of different ways of tying waraji straps; even historically, there was no standardised method of attaching the shoes to one's feet.

== Ceremonial use ==
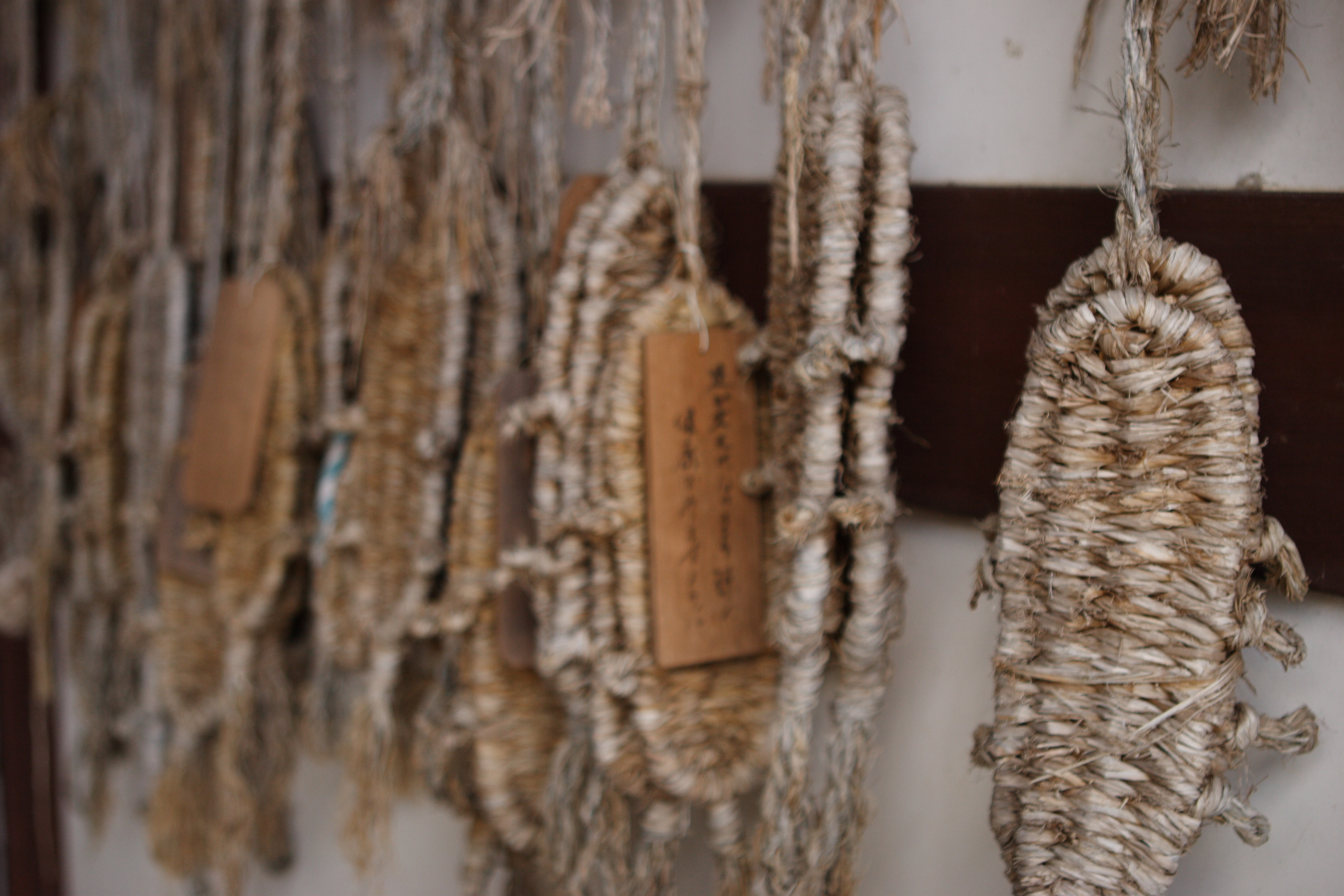
Waraji hung as offerings in Kyoto

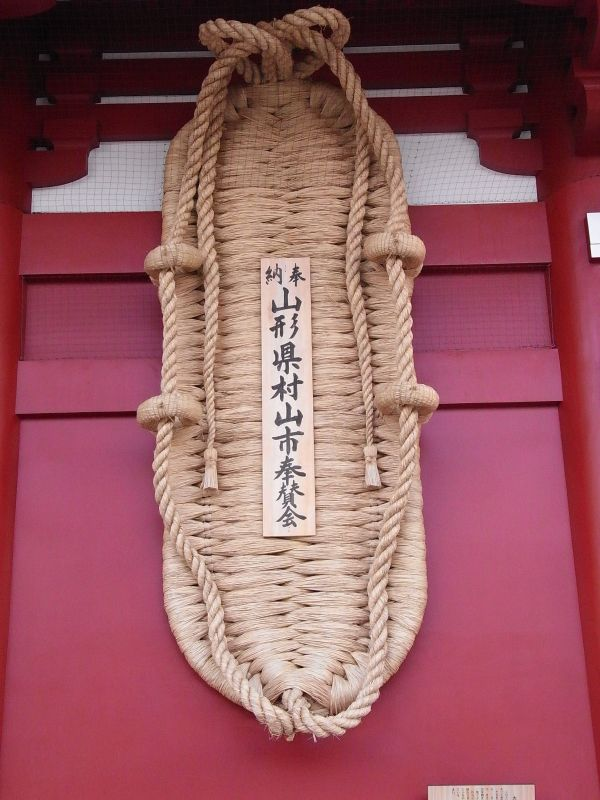
A giant o-waraji in Asakusa Temple, Tokyo

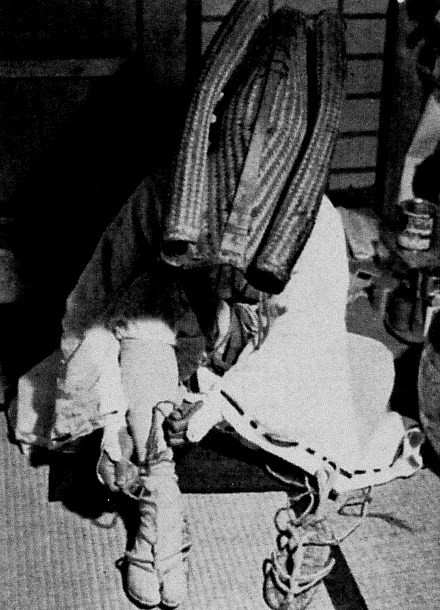
A pilgrim performing kaihōgyō laces waraji over tabi, 1954

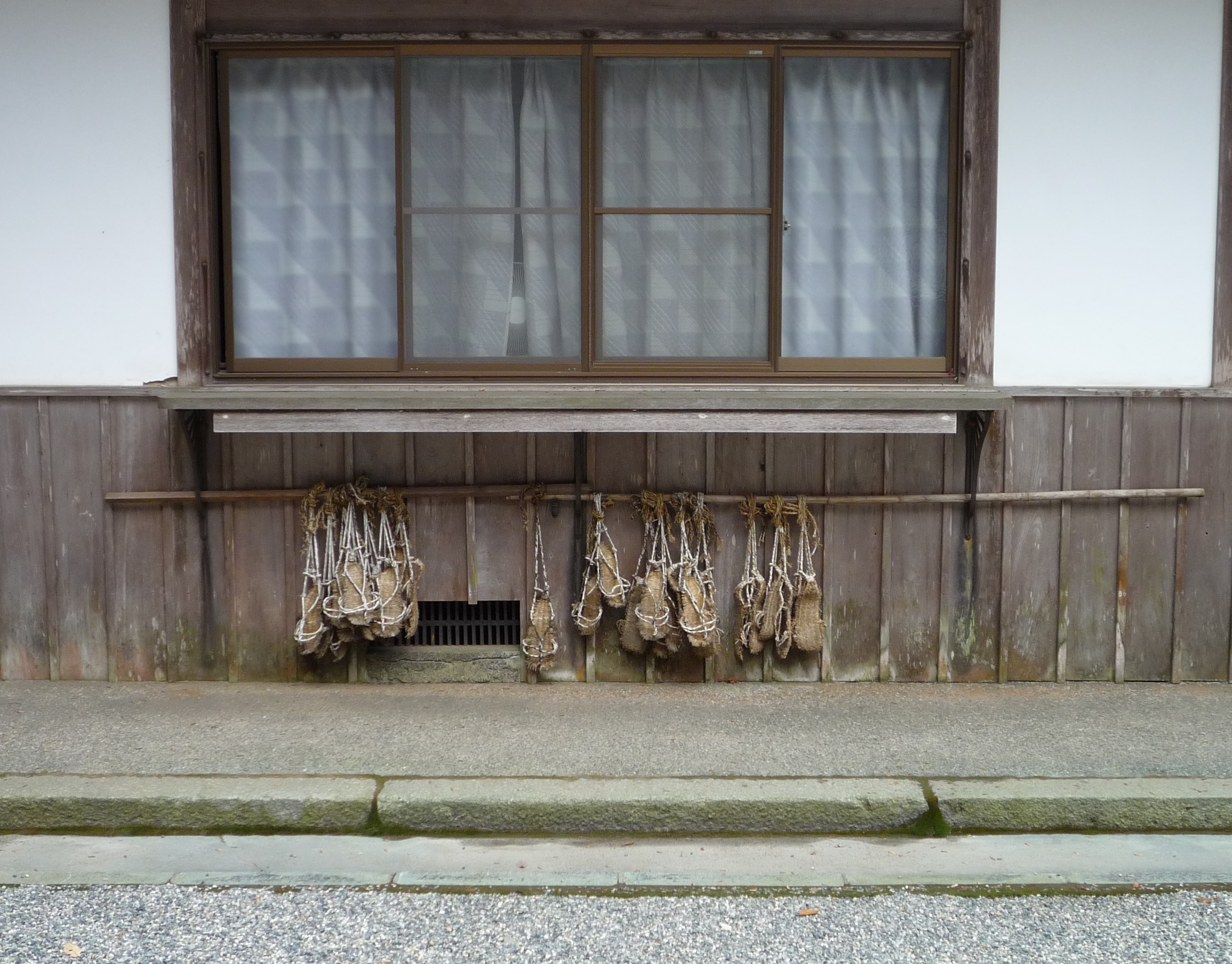
The worn-out waraji of monks who have completed the kaihōgyō, 2009

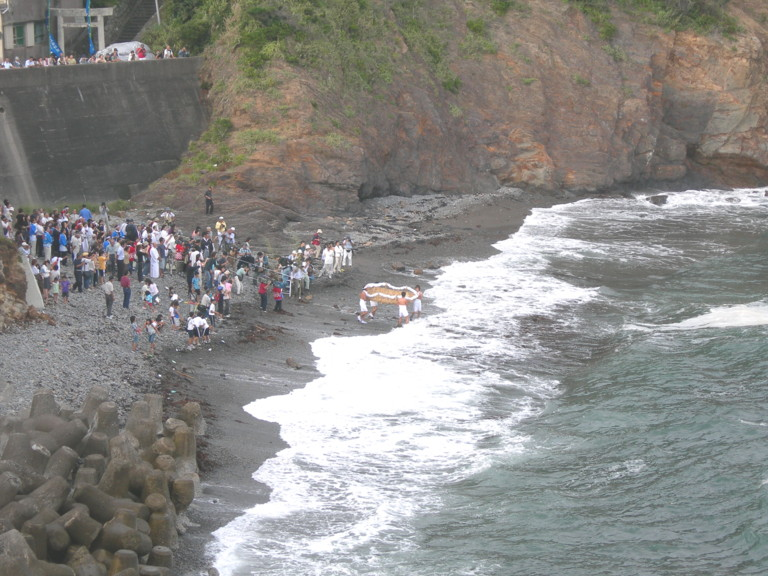
An o-waraji is carried into the sea at a waraji festival, Nakiri-jinja, 2006

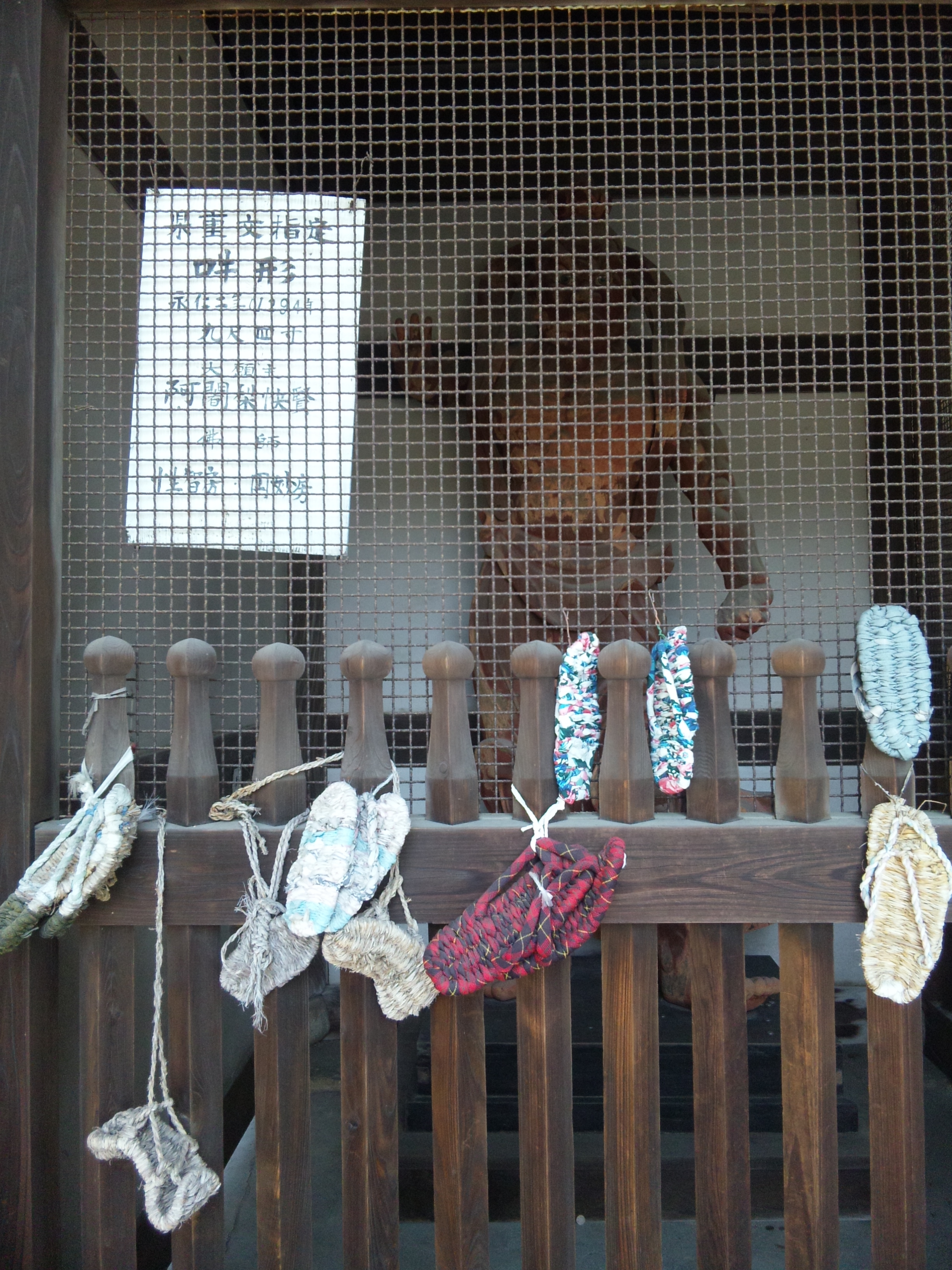
Straw- and rag-woven sandals hung as offerings

Traditionally, waraji were donated to temples as offerings for healthy feet and protection on journeys. This practice, while now less common, is still followed. More modernly, giant waraji ('o-waraji') kept in temples are touched as a charm for tireless endurance in walking.

== See also ==
- List of shoe styles
- Bast shoe, similar Northeastern European shoe
- Geta, traditional Japanese wooden clogs
- Huarache (shoe), traditional Mexican sandals constructed from woven strips of leather
- Jika-tabi, traditional Japanese split-toe workboots
- Jipsin and mit'uri, similar Korean shoes
- Okobo, traditional Japanese wooden platform clogs
- Tabi, traditional Japanese split-toe socks
- Zori, traditional Japanese sandals
