= Yi Kwal =

Korean rebel leader (1587–1624)

- Hangul: 이괄
- Hanja: 李适
- RR: I Gwal
- MR: I Kwal

Yi Kwal (Korean: 이괄; Hanja: 李适; 1562 – 14 February 1624) was a general during the Joseon Dynasty, Korea, known for the failed Yi Kwal's Rebellion. His family belonged to the Goseong Yi clan.

He rebelled against King Injo in 1624, but failed. Yi Kwal was then killed by his own troops. Yi Kwal's rebellion put Korea into a state of chaos before it was invaded by the Manchu Qing dynasty.

== Background ==
In 1622, he joined the Injo revolution, which was a movement in Korea to get rid of the government of King Gwanghaegun, who advocated evenhanded diplomacy between the Ming and the Qing. At that time, the Han Ming Dynasty had recently fallen to the invading Jurchen, who had renamed themselves the Manchu. Historically, Korea was in a long time conflict with the Jurchen tribes, who inhabited the wide plains of Manchuria. The Jurchen took Liaoning during the late Ming and established the Later Jin dynasty.

Yi Kwal captured the capital, Hanyang, and exiled Gwanghaegun. However, he was rewarded only as a second class helper and neglected by the King.

As the relations with Later Jin deteriorated, the Korean government and Injo sent Yi Kwal to the border of Pyongan Province to ward off invasions from the Jin. There, Yi strengthened the walls and fortresses around the border and maintained strict military order.

Out of the fifteen thousand troops stationed in the northern border, Yi Kwal had command of ten thousand, stationed in Yongbyon while the five thousand stayed with General Jang Man (张晚) in Pyongyang.

== Yi Kwal's Rebellion ==
Korea's political stance at the time caused the downfall of Yi Kwal. Since the establishment of a Confucian dynasty by King Taejo, there had been political disputes between the parties in the government. Some disputes even ended up in bloodshed, like the one which occurred in the time of King Yeonsangun. Also, during the time of King Seonjo just before the Japanese invasions of Korea, the political parties had been divided between the Easterners and the Westerners. The Easterners gradually split up into two parties called the Northerners and the Southerners.

In January 1624, the Westerners, recently unsatisfied with the success of Yi Kwal (who was part of the Northerners), made a petition to the King stating that Yi Kwal and some members of the Northerners were planning a rebellion. As these ministers all had a close relationship with the King, the petition was examined. However, the reports proved false, and the Westerners failed to condemn Yi Kwal. They tried again soon after, which provoked the suspicion of the King.

The government soon sent an examination and arrest party to Yongbyon to arrest Yi Kwal's son Yi Jeon. As he suspected that he himself would be condemned if his son confessed, he decided on a pre-emptive strike. Finally, he killed the arrest party and the rebellion officially began on January 22, 1624. He and his ten thousand troops headed straight for Hanyang, to relieve the capital and capture the King.

The first clash with the government troops happened on the Hamgyong province, where the government troops were being led by Jeong Chung-sin and Nam Yi-hong. He tried to avoid these two generals and surpassed their troops. During the march to the capital, Yi Kwal met much opposition, but all were defeated. Injo soon abandoned the capital and Yi Kwal captured it on February 10. Since the establishment of the Joseon Dynasty, it was the first time a rebel army had captured the capital.

Yi Kwal then put Heungangun on the throne, a royal relative of the King. Moreover, he put fliers all over the city so the people would support his troops. However, the rebel occupation of the capital did not last long.

Hanseong was soon threatened by Jang Man and other generals from the government forces. Yi Kwal sent Han Myeong-ryun to combat the enemy, but the rebels were defeated due to inferior geographical position. By this time, Yi Kwal tried to escape the capital as the rebel army had disbanded and separated. As Yi Kwal and Han Myeong-ryun tried to escape on February 15, they were murdered by their own troops led by Gi Ik-heon, who were seeking forgiveness from the government.

Yi Kwal failed, but Joseon society effectively entered a period of chaos, which then provoked and facilitated the First Manchu invasion of Korea in 1627. Eventually Joseon would fall and become a vassal to the Qing dynasty.

Afterwards, Yi Kwal's name, along with his father's, was omitted from the family genealogy, but was listed again after 1930. Additional records were discovered about his relative, Yi Eung-tae, who died around the age of 30, and research was being conducted on the mummy discovered for the first time in 445 years.

== Family ==
- Father - Yi Je (이제, 李磾) (1538 - ?)
- Mother - Lady Jeong of the Dongrae Jeong clan (동래 정씨, 東萊 鄭氏) (1539 - ?)
- Sibling(s)
  - Older brother - Yi Jeok (이적, 李適) (1550 - ?)
  - Older brother - Yi Woon (이운, 李胤) (1560 - ?)
  - Younger brother - Yi Su (이수, 李胄) (1564 - 1624)
  - Younger brother - Yi Don (이돈, 李遯)
- Spouse
  - Lady Yi of the Gwangju Yi clan (광주 이씨, 廣州 李氏) (1566 - 1624)
- Issue
  - Son - Yi Jeon (이전, 李栴) (1588 - ?)
  - Daughter - Lady Yi of the Goseong Yi clan (고성 이씨, 固城 李氏) (1590 - ?)
- Relative
  - Yi Eung-tae (이응태) (1556 - 1586)

== See also ==
- History of Korea
- Manchu invasion of Korea
