= Chipsin =

Traditional Korean sandals made of straw

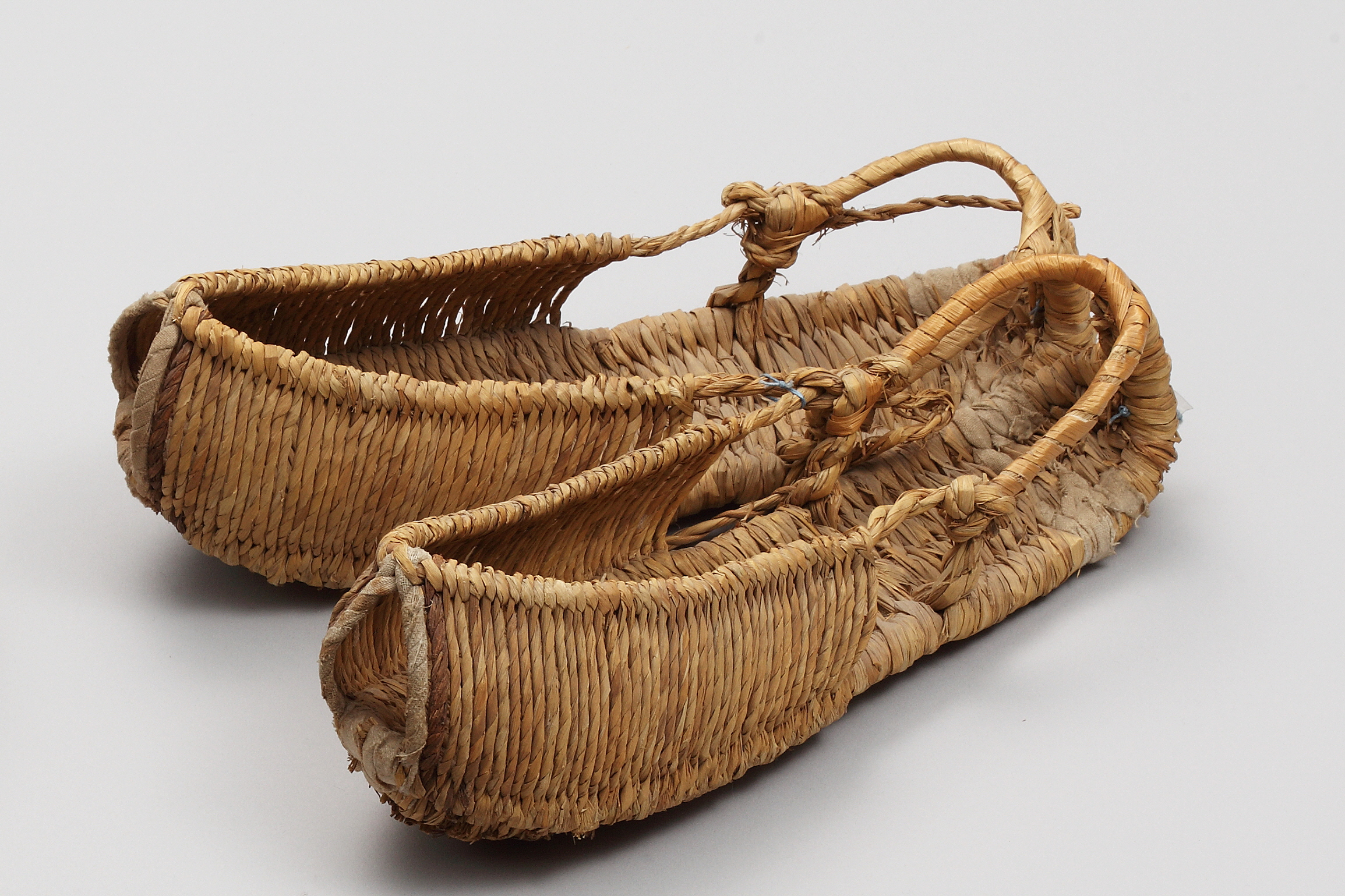

Korean name
- Hangul: 짚신
- RR: jipsin
- MR: chipsin

Chipsin (Korean: 짚신), also romanized jipsin, are Korean traditional sandals made of straw. Koreans have worn straw sandals since ancient times. They are categorized as i (이; 履; shoes with a short height), and the specific name can vary according to the materials used, as with samsin, wanggolsin, ch'ŏngol chisin, and pudŭlsin.

In the Joseon period, chipsin were worn mostly by commoners, working farmers. The shoes were meant for walking, and wore down quickly. A full day's worth of walking would often wear out a pair. As such, most people knew how to make the shoes themselves. This was even true of middle and even upper-class women; it was not "considered lowering for her to engage in making of straw shoes".

They are very similar, especially in form, to mit'uri, which are also traditional Korean woven shoes. The difference lies primarily in materials; chipsin are typically made of straw, while mituri are made from hemp, Cyperus exaltatus (왕골), or cattail.

== Gallery ==
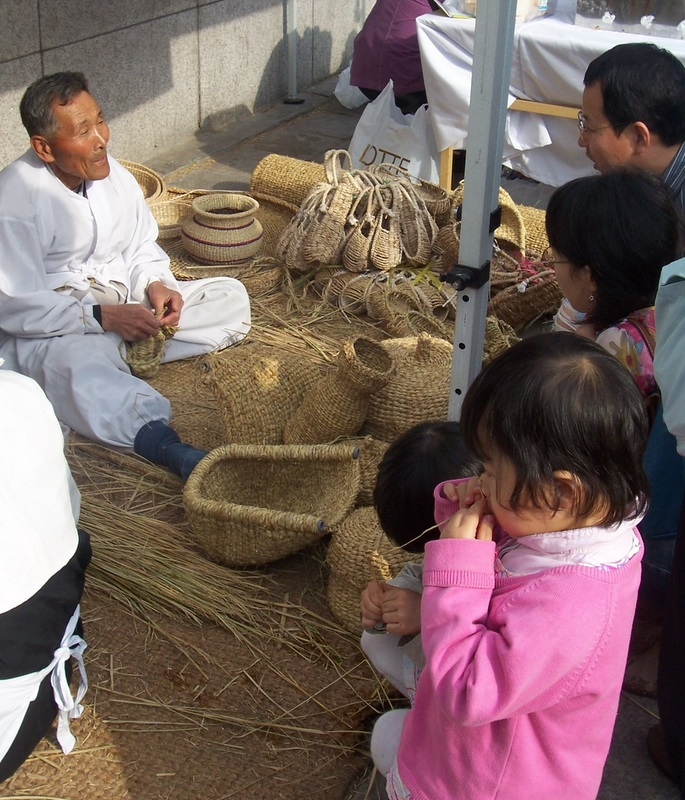
A man (left) making chipsin (2008)

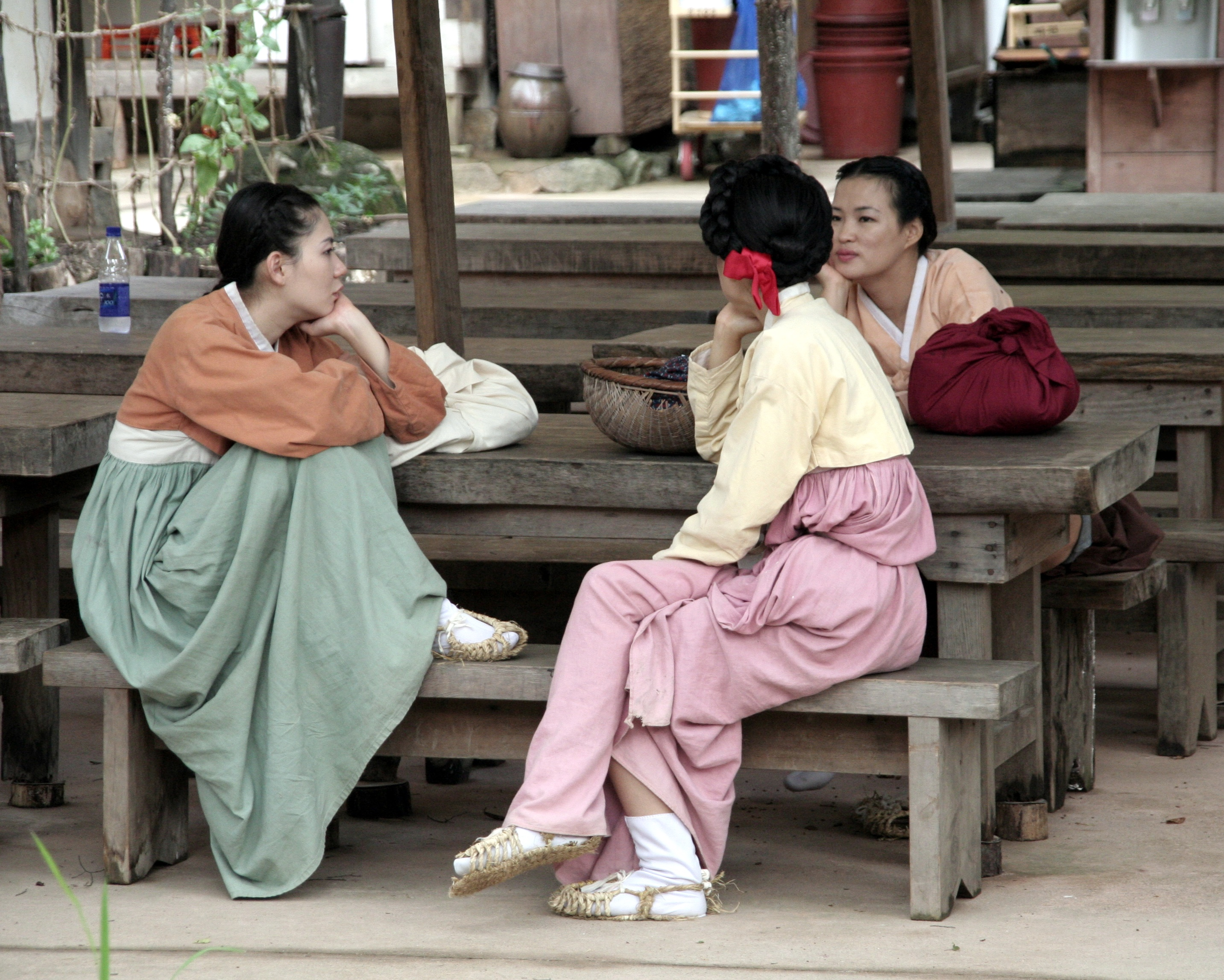
Women in a Korean folk village wearing chipsin and hanbok (2008)

== See also ==
- List of shoe styles
- Hwa
- Saekki
- Waraji
