= Mit'uri =

Traditional Korean woven shoes

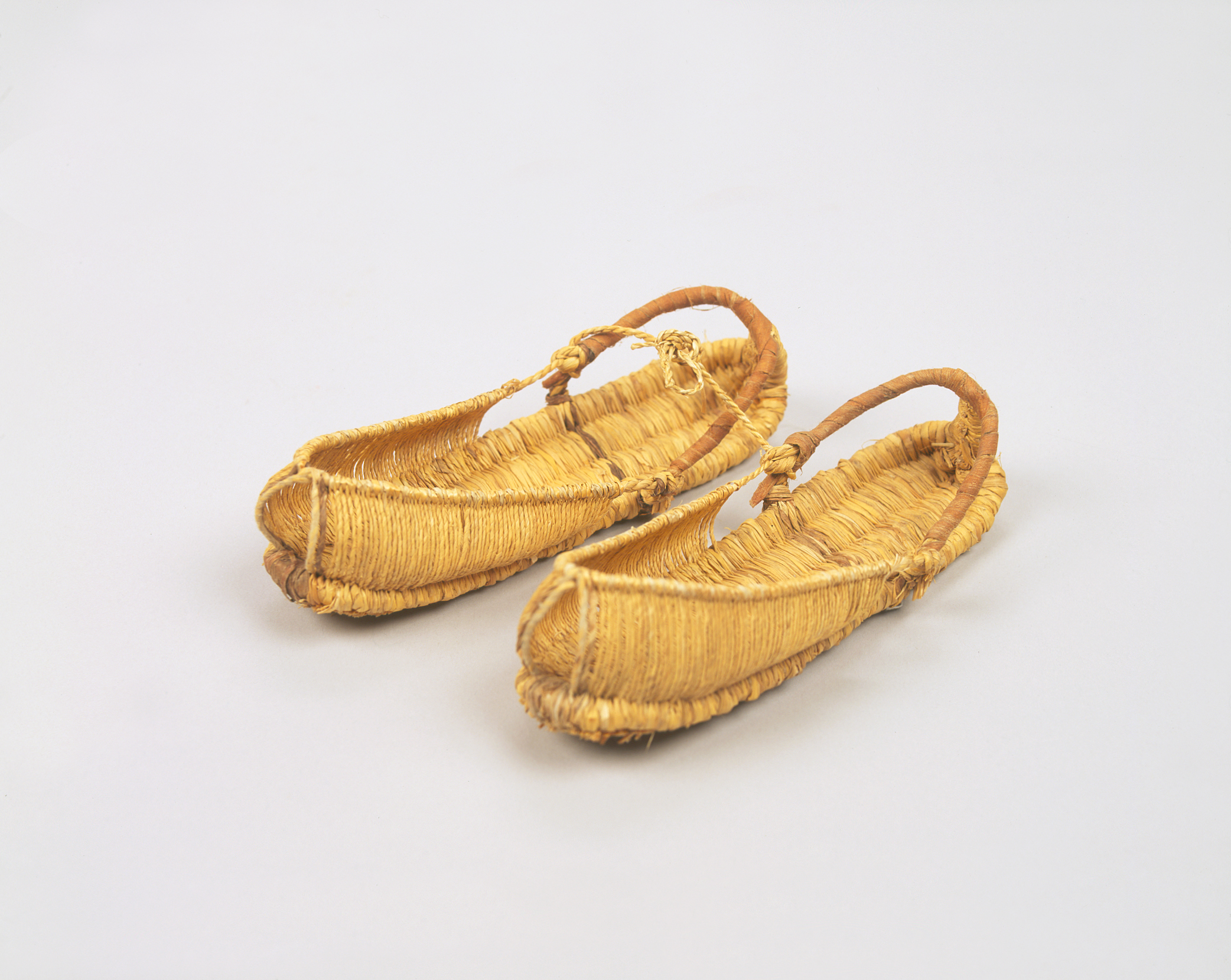

Korean name
- Hangul: 미투리
- RR: mituri
- MR: mit'uri

Mit'uri (Korean: 미투리) are traditional Korean woven shoes. They could be made using a variety of techniques and materials; some styles were seen as more luxurious, and therefore reserved for the upper class, although both lower and upper-class people wore the shoes. The shoes could be dyed in a variety of patterns and colors.

They are very similar, especially in form, to chipsin, which are also traditional Korean woven shoes. The difference lies primarily in materials; chipsin are typically made of straw, while mit'uri are made from a variety of materials, including hemp, Cyperus exaltatus (왕골), or cattail.

The shoes wore down easily; when going on a long journey, people would bring along extra pairs of mit'uri, depending on the expected amount of walking needed.

A famous example of mit'uri is those from the tomb of Lee Eung-tae. The shoes were woven using a mixture of hemp and human hair; they were created ritually by Lee's wife, likely to pray for Lee's recovery from illness.

== See also ==
- List of Korean clothing
