= Saekki =

Rope made of woven straw

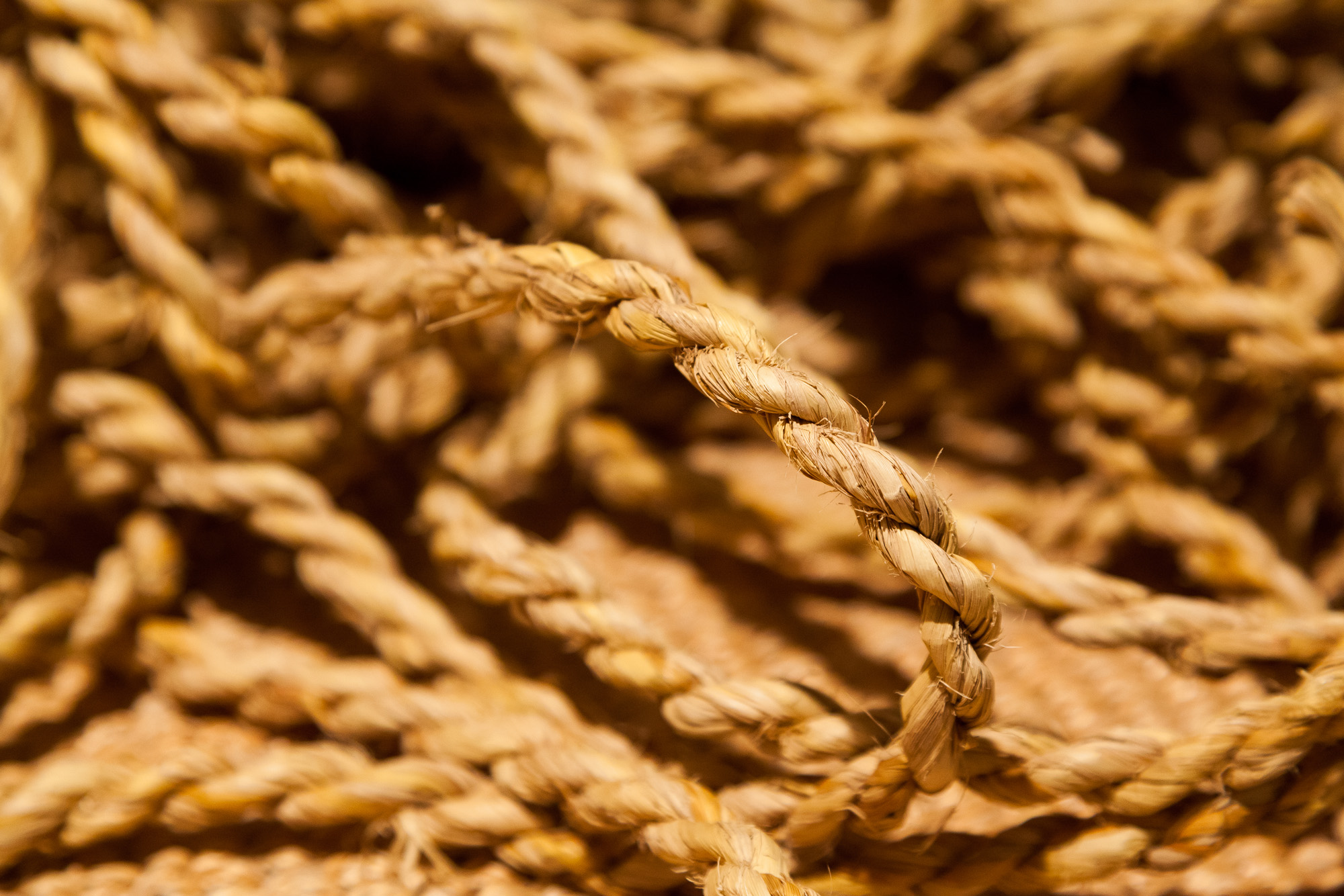

Korean name
- Hangul: 새끼
- RR: saekki
- MR: saekki
- IPA: [sɛ.k͈i]

Saekki (Korean: 새끼) is a rope made of woven straw. It was an important household item used in pre-modern agricultural Korea.

== History ==
Grey stoneware (hard pottery) from the Proto–Three Kingdoms era (2nd century BCE‒3rd century CE) demonstrates evidence of saekki. Ceramic sculptures of chipsin (straw shoes) from Silla (57 BCE‒935 CE) indicates the usage of saekki in this period.

During the Joseon era (1392–1897), sakkye (a guild of the tribute merchants of ropes) was one of the konggye (guilds of tribute merchants, the government-licensed purchasing agents) that had monopolistic rights for supplying government requirements.

During the Japanese forced occupation (1910–1945), a large amount of saekki along with kamani (straw bags) were looted for military use by the Imperial Japanese Army.

Saekki was widely used until the 1960s. In the 1970s, the use of saekki waned with the spread of plastic, vinyl, and synthetic fiber ropes. Saekki faced a resurgence at the end of the 20th century due to growing interest in traditional handicraft in recent decades.

== Uses ==
Saekki was used to make common items such as chipsin (straw shoes), kamani (straw bags), kojige (A-shaped carrier frames) and koppi (고삐; lit. 'cattle halters'). It was also used as kŭmjul (금줄; lit. 'taboo ropes') to ward off malignant influences in Korean folk religion.

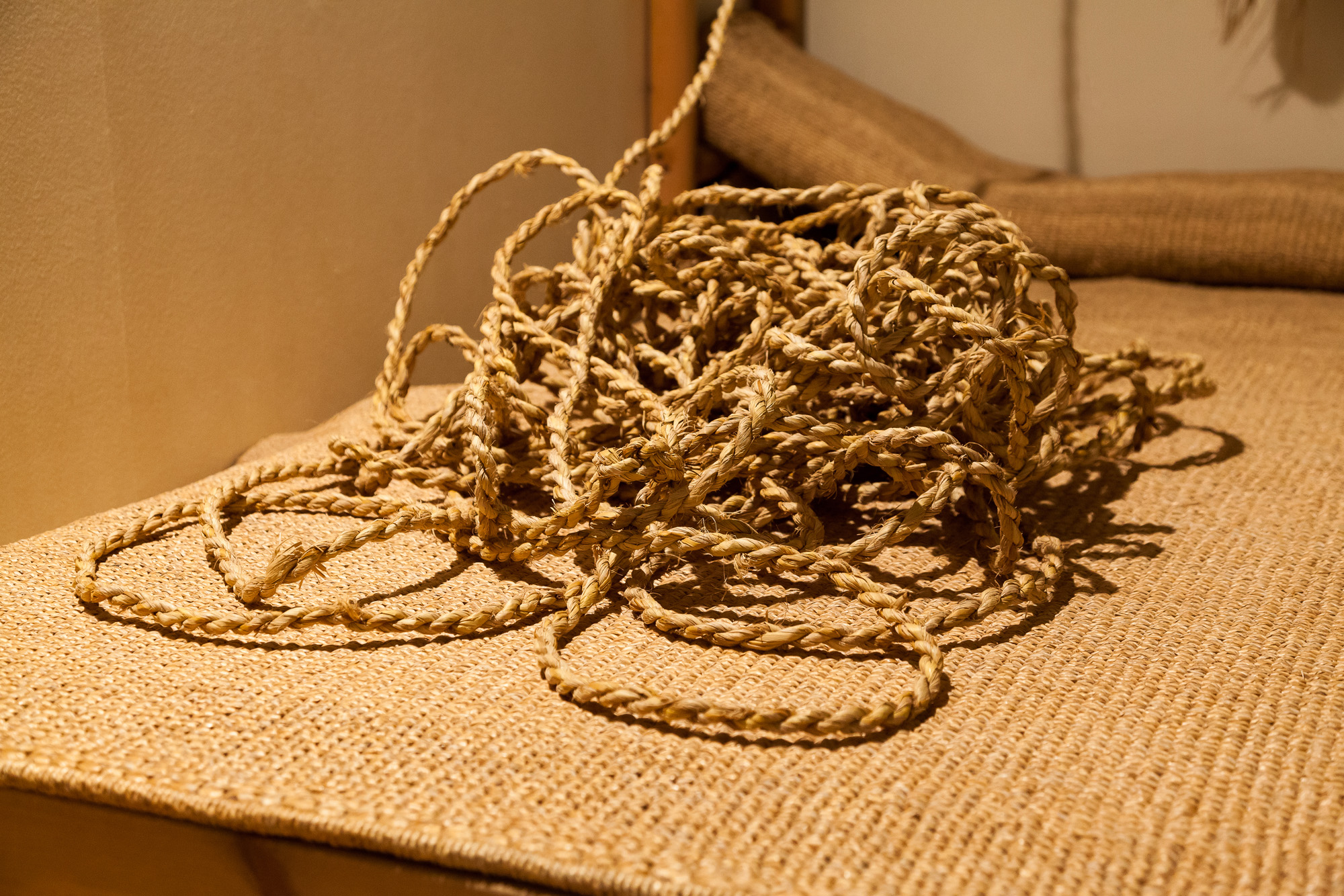
Saekki (straw rope)

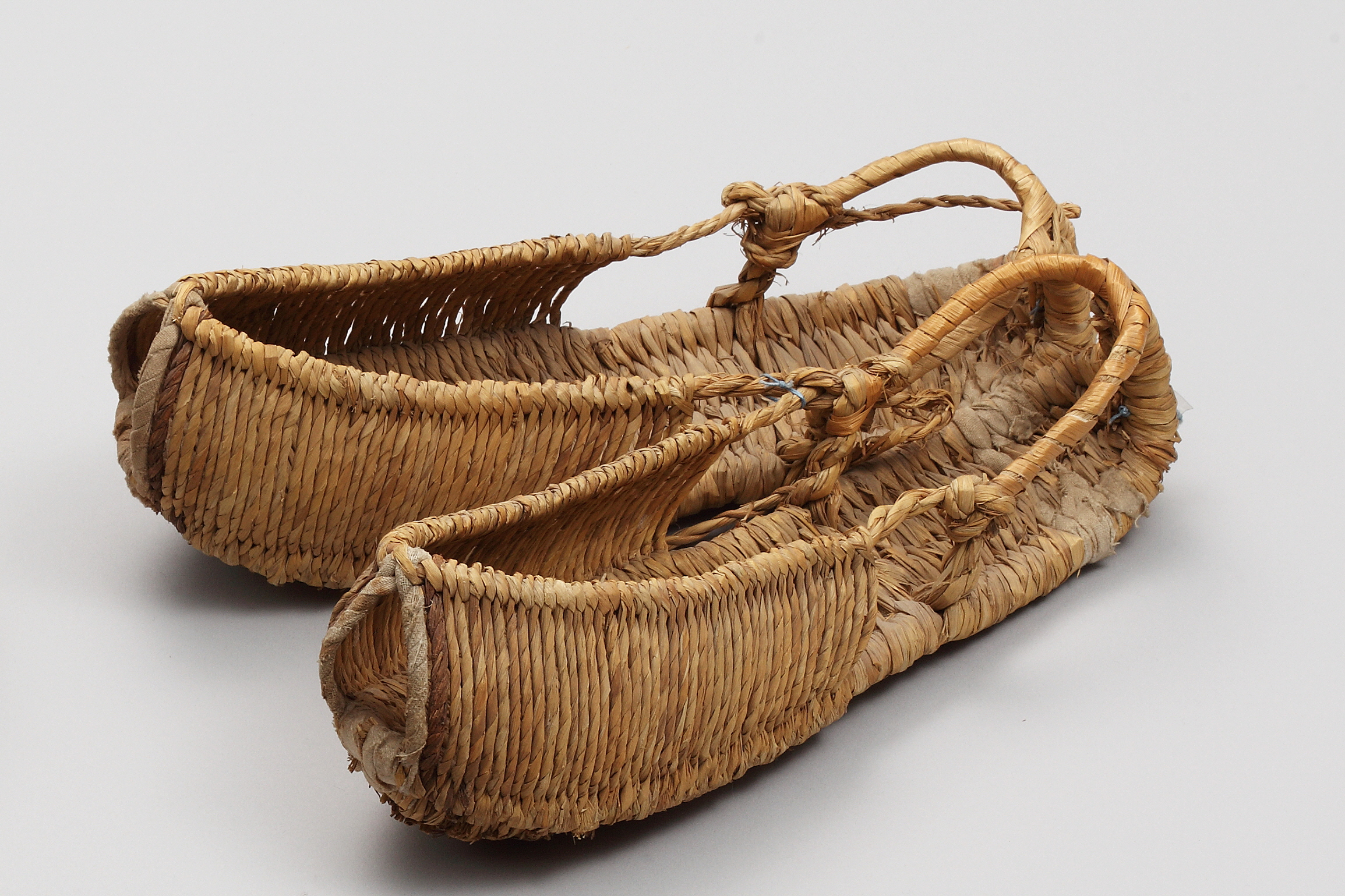
Chipsin (straw shoes)

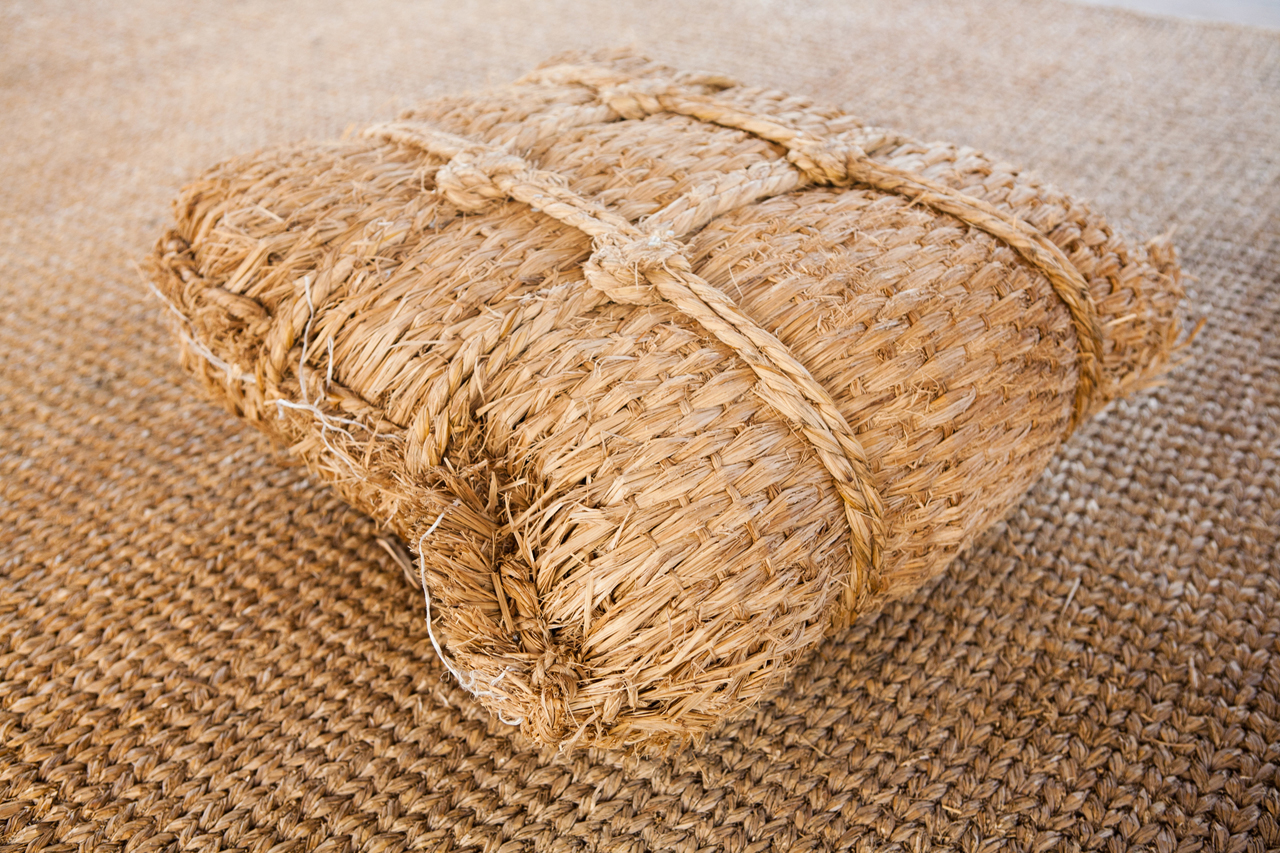
Kamani (straw bag)

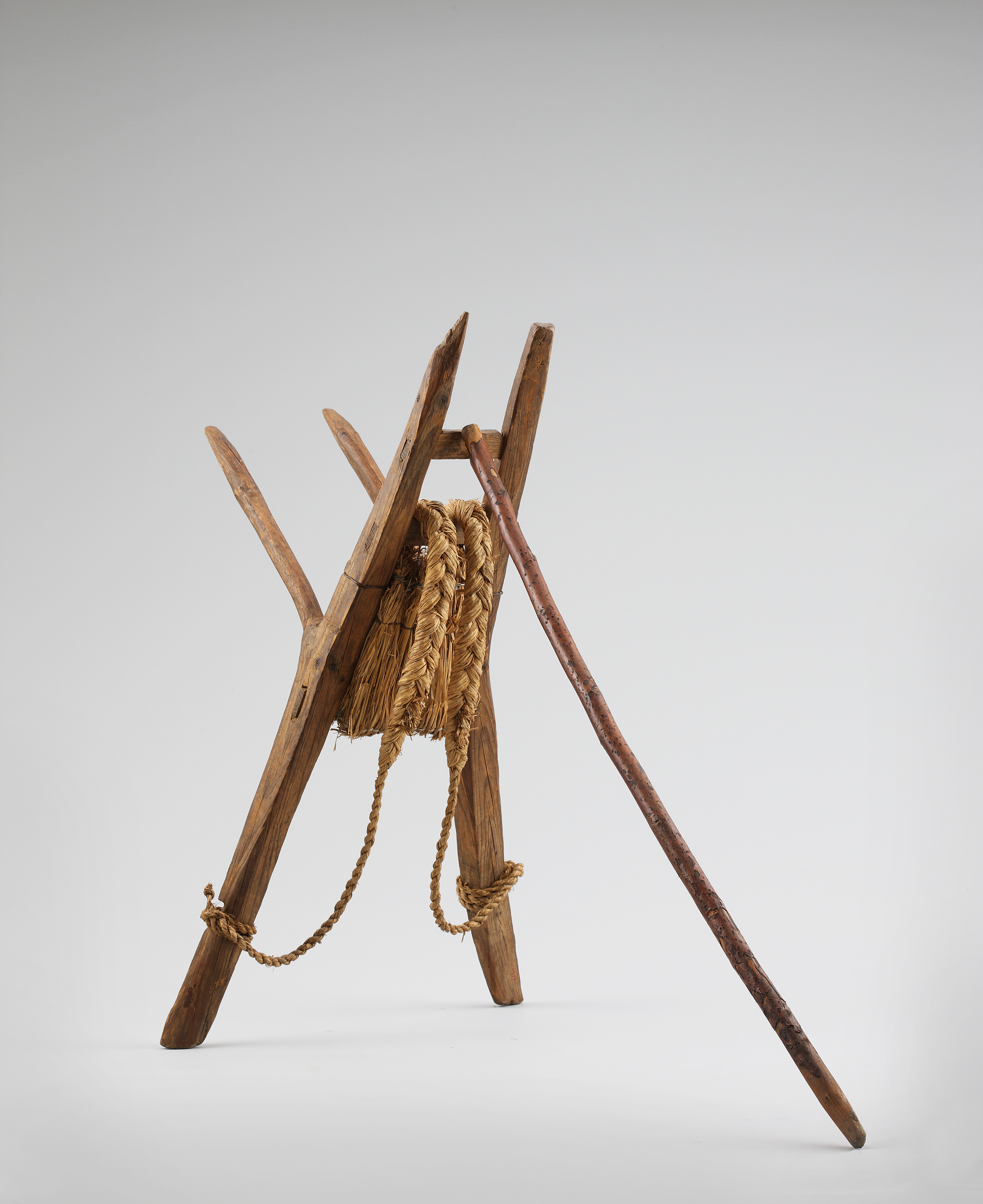
Jige (A-shaped carrier frame)

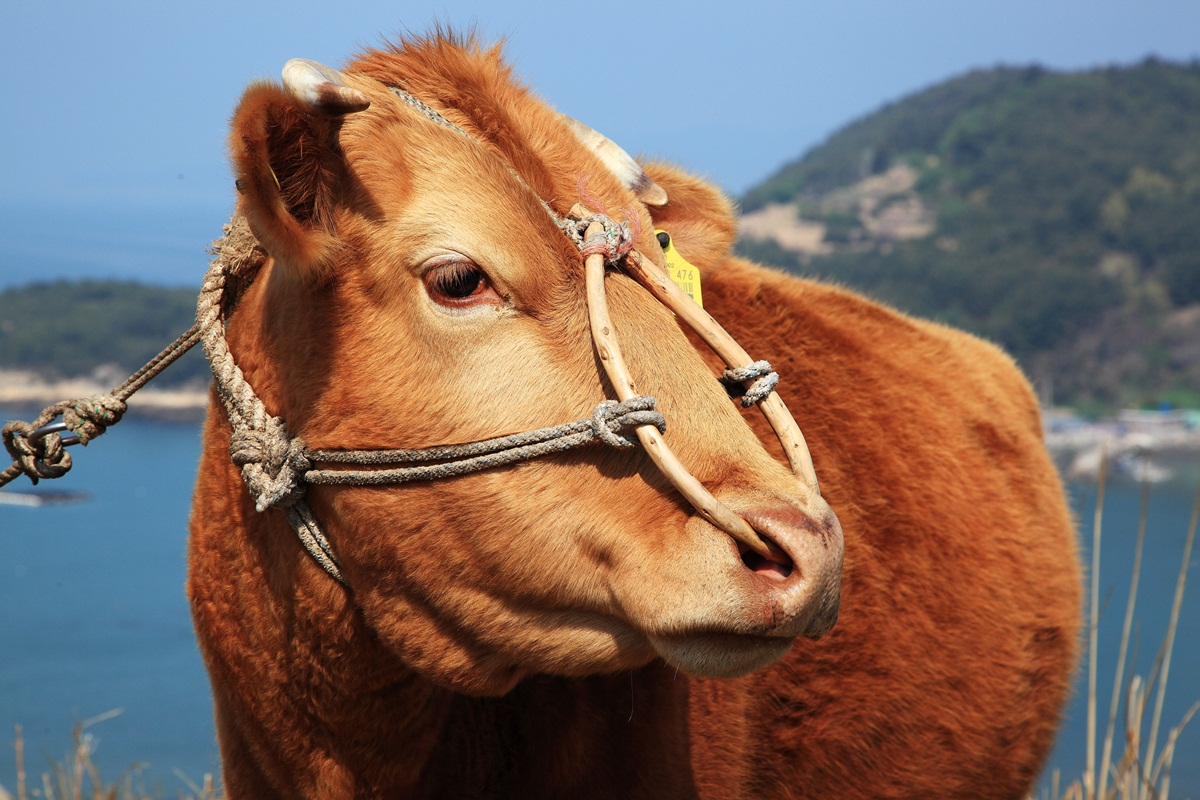
Koppi (cattle halter)

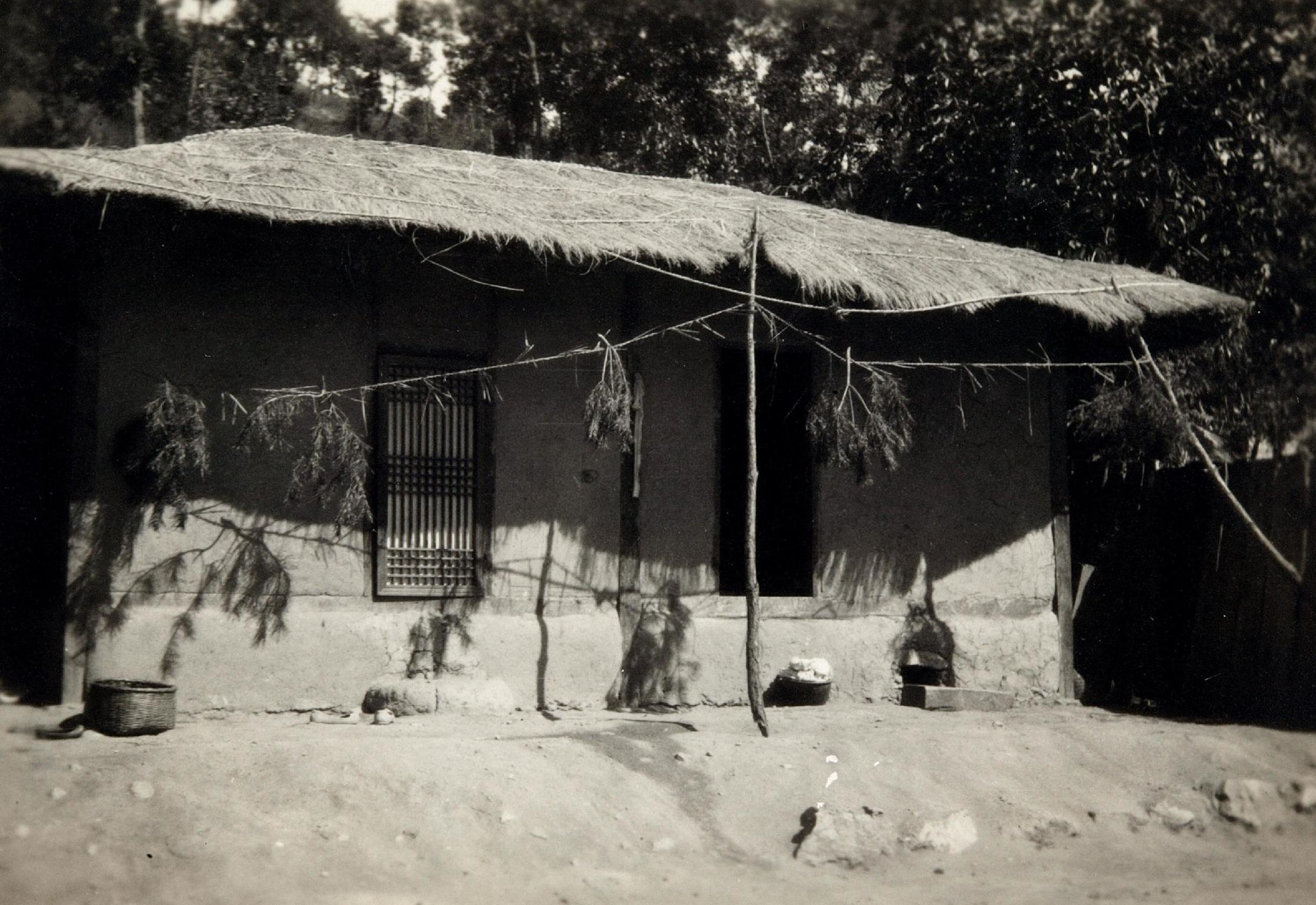
Kŭmjul (taboo ropes)
