= Letter to Yi Ŭngt'ae =

1586 Korean letter from widow to husband

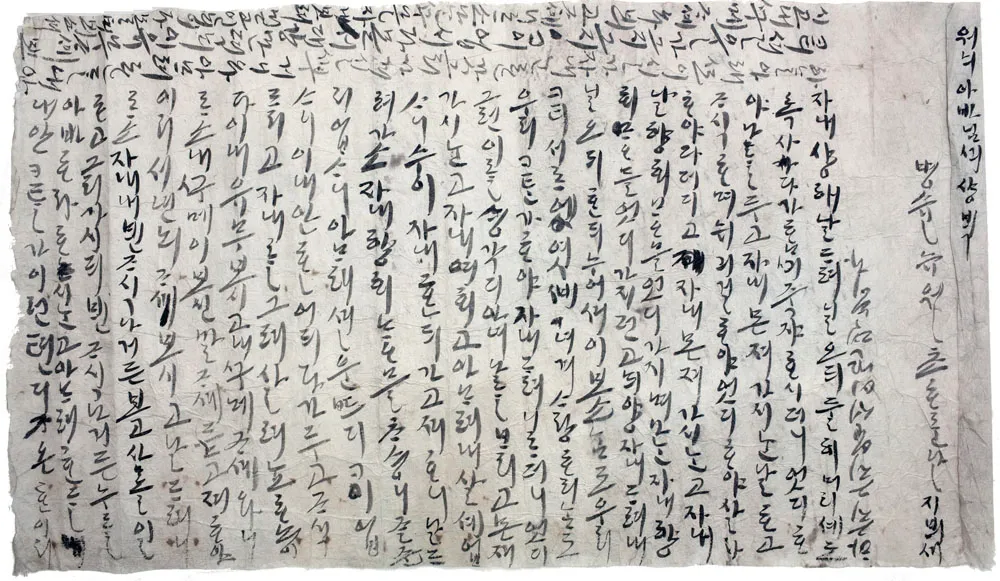
The letter

In 1586, an unnamed pregnant widow wrote a letter for her deceased husband Yi Ŭngt'ae (Korean: 이응태; Hanja: 李應台; 1555–1586), mourning his early death and expressing sorrow that her children will grow up without a father. Written by a member of an elite family during the Joseon period, the letter was composed in colloquial Middle Korean using the Hangul script. The author's emotional language indicates that the letter was meant to be private, as members of the Korean Confucian elite were discouraged from strong expressions of emotion.

The letter was discovered in 1998 in Yi's tomb in Jeongsang-dong, Andong, South Korea, while moving the tomb and body elsewhere. It and other materials from the tomb are also considered to be valuable historical artifacts for understanding the language and customs of the era. The letter's contents and use of language reflect the relatively equal status of wives and husbands around this period in Korean history and the story has since become widely known in South Korea, with a number of works of historical fiction produced about the couple.

== Background ==
Yi Ŭngt'ae lived from 1555 to 1586. He was a local nobleman of the Goseong Yi clan, and was the second son of his father, Yi Yosin (이요신; 李堯臣). He died at the age of 31, possibly from an epidemic, based on letters from Yi Yosin. At the time of his death, he had a young son – possibly around 5–6 years old – and a pregnant wife. Little is known about Ŭngt'ae's wife, the author of the letter. Her name is unknown; it is not listed in family records. Since the name of one of the two children is given as "Wŏn" (원) on the letter – although it is unclear which child the name belonged to – she is often referred to as "Wŏn's mother" (원이 어머니).

=== Discovery ===
In April 1998, an urban renewal project was being conducted on the south bank of the Nakdong River in Andong. In preparation for this, an archaeological team from Andong National University was sent to excavate and move several earthen mound tombs on the top of a slope, in accordance with the wishes of some living descendants. On April 24, the team excavated Yi's grave.

Initially, the only known information about the occupant of the grave was Yi's name. His body had been naturally mummified – likely due to the properties of his tomb – and was then still in good condition, although it was reburied elsewhere on the same day, in accordance with the family's wishes. Records from the Goseong Lee clan and documents from within a pouch in the grave were cross-referenced to piece together information about who Yi was.

=== Materials in tomb ===
A range of materials were gathered from the tomb; they are now stored in the university's museum. Documents in the tomb were written by a number of different people, with one of them being Yi's wife. The texts were often written affectionately towards Yi, which gave the archaeologists the impression that he was beloved by the family.

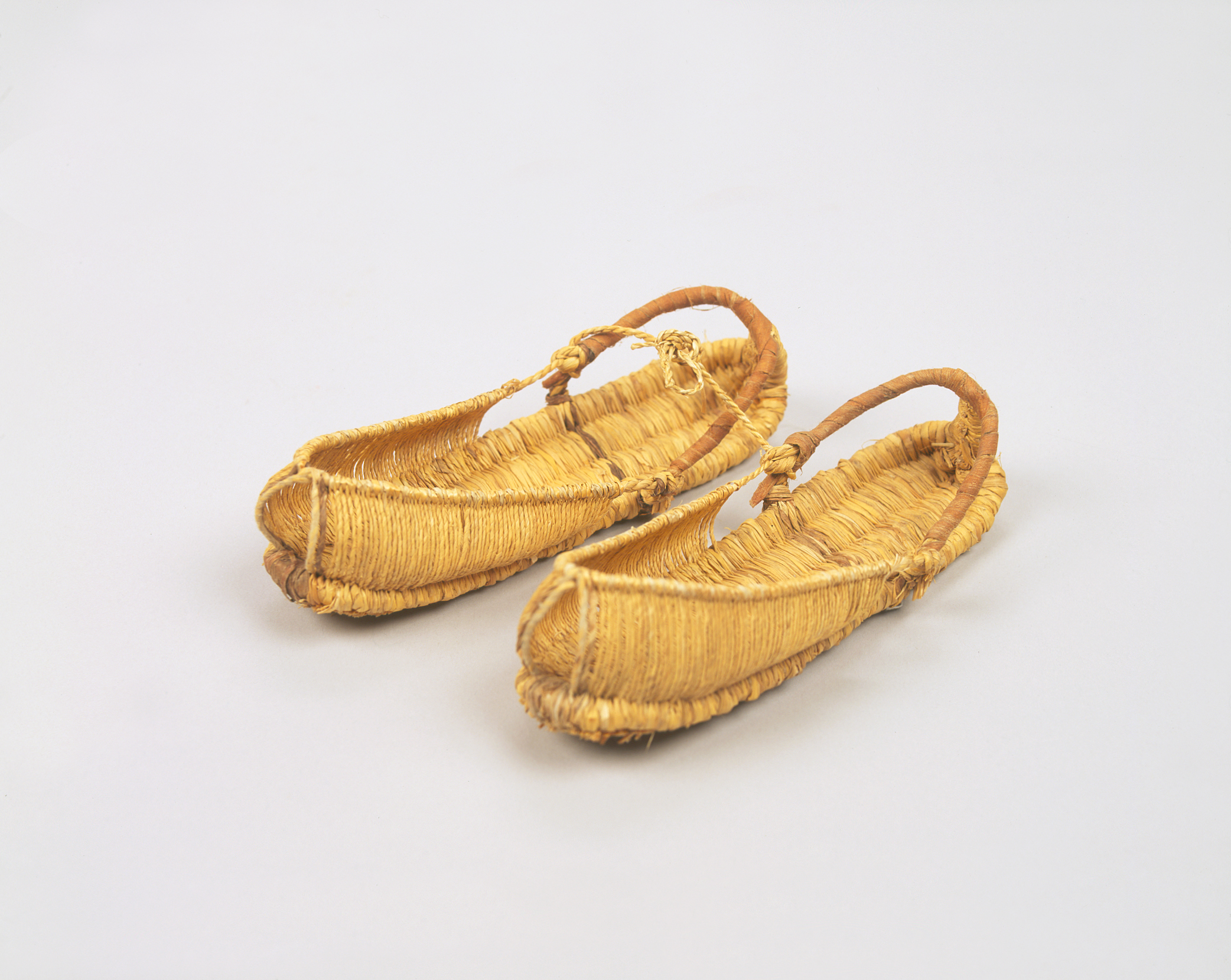
A pair of mit'uri

Wŏn's mother also wrote two other texts in addition to her letter. One was written on hanji (Korean paper) wrapped around a lock of hair. The legible text on the paper reads: "Please bury this beside... do not discard this...". Another was written on paper wrapped around a pair of mit'uri (woven shoes) that were woven using a mix of hemp and hair. The historian Hwisang Cho described the shoes as "love tokens". It reads: "Using my hair, made these shoes... died before they could be worn". Handwriting analysis matched the writing on these papers to that on her letter. It is believed that she ritually wove the shoes using her hair in order to pray for her husband's health; a practice that has been attested to in other instances during the Joseon period.

The tomb also contained around forty to fifty articles of clothing. The clothing included a mix from Yi, the infant child, and Wŏn's mother. Examples included jeogori, baji, danryeong, jikryeong, aekjureum (액주름; men's upperwear), and women's clothing such as jang-ot and dongja (동자; women's upperwear). Leaving clothes of the family inside a tomb was a common practice during this part of the Joseon period. The clothes left behind revealed physical characteristics about the family; Yi was around 180 cm (5 ft 11 in) tall, and his wife was around 160 cm (5 ft 3 in).

== Description ==
The letter is written vertically and right-to-left, using a brush, and on a piece of hanji that measures 58.5 by 34 cm (23.0 by 13.4 in). After writing until the left end of the page, Wŏn's mother wrote more on the top margin of the page, until she ran out of space for further writing. One line of text, the third from the right, was written upside down. The letter had been placed on Yi's chest.

=== Text ===
Original (Hangul, Middle Korean)

병슐 뉴월 초ᄒᆞᄅᆞᆫ날 지븨셔
워늬 아바님ᄭᅴ 샹ᄇᆡᆨ
자내 샹해 날ᄃᆞ려 닐오ᄃᆡ
둘히 머리 셰도록 사다가 ᄒᆞᆷᄭᅴ 죽쟈 ᄒᆞ시더니
엇디ᄒᆞ야 나ᄅᆞᆯ 두고 자내 몬져 가시ᄂᆞᆫ
날ᄒᆞ고 ᄌᆞ식ᄒᆞ며 뉘 긔걸ᄒᆞ야 엇디ᄒᆞ야 살라 ᄒᆞ야 다 더디고
자내 몬져 가시ᄂᆞᆫ고
자내 날 향ᄒᆡ ᄆᆞᄋᆞ믈 엇디 가지며
나ᄂᆞᆫ 자내 향ᄒᆡ ᄆᆞᄋᆞ믈 엇디 가지던고
ᄆᆡ양 자내ᄃᆞ려 내 닐오ᄃᆡ
ᄒᆞᆫᄃᆡ 누어셔 이 보소
ᄂᆞᆷ도 우리ᄀᆞ티 서ᄅᆞ 에엿ᄲᅵ 녀겨 ᄉᆞ랑ᄒᆞ리
ᄂᆞᆷ도 우리 ᄀᆞᄐᆞᆫ가 ᄒᆞ야 자내ᄃᆞ려 니ᄅᆞ더니
엇디 그런 이ᄅᆞᆯ ᄉᆡᆼ각디 아녀
나ᄅᆞᆯ ᄇᆞ리고 몬져 가시ᄂᆞᆫ고
자내 여ᄒᆡ고 아ᄆᆞ려 내 살 셰 업ᄉᆞ니
수이 자내 ᄒᆞᆫᄃᆡ 가고져 ᄒᆞ니 날 ᄃᆞ려가소
자내 향ᄒᆡ ᄆᆞᄋᆞ믈 ᄎᆞᄉᆡᆼ 니ᄌᆞᆯ 줄리 업ᄉᆞ니
아ᄆᆞ려 셜운 ᄠᅳ디 ᄀᆞ이업ᄉᆞ니
이내 안ᄒᆞᆯ 어ᄃᆡ다가 두고
ᄌᆞ식 ᄃᆞ리고 자내ᄅᆞᆯ 그려 살려뇨 ᄒᆞ노이다
이 내 유무 보시고 내 ᄭᅮ메 ᄌᆞ셰 와 니ᄅᆞ소
내 ᄭᅮ메 이 보신 말 ᄌᆞ셰 듣고져 ᄒᆞ야 이리 서 년뇌
ᄌᆞ셰 보시고 날ᄃᆞ려 니ᄅᆞ소
자내 내 ᄇᆡᆫ ᄌᆞ식 나거든 보고 사롤 일ᄒᆞ고 그리 가시ᄃᆡ
ᄇᆡᆫ ᄌᆞ식 나거든 누ᄅᆞᆯ 아바 ᄒᆞ라 ᄒᆞ시ᄂᆞᆫ고
아ᄆᆞ려ᄒᆞᆫᄃᆞᆯ 내 안 ᄀᆞᄐᆞᆯ가
이런 텬디 구온ᄒᆞᆫ 이리 하ᄂᆞᆯ 아래 ᄯᅩ 이실가
자내ᄂᆞᆫ ᄒᆞᆫ갓 그리 가 겨실 ᄲᅮ거니와
아ᄆᆞ려ᄒᆞᆫᄃᆞᆯ 내 안ᄀᆞ티 셜울가
그지그지 ᄀᆞ이업서 다 몯 서 대강만 뎍뇌
이 유무 ᄌᆞ셰 보시고 내 ᄭᅮ메 ᄌᆞ셰 와 뵈고 ᄌᆞ셰 니르소
나ᄂᆞᆫ ᄭᅮ믈 자내 보려 믿고 인뇌이다
모ᄅᆞ매 뵈쇼셔

Translation (Note: Based on translations to modern Korean)

1st day, 6th month of 1586, (Note: Per the lunisolar Korean calendar. The year is given as byeongsul; a year in the sexagenary cycle.) from home
To the father of Wŏn,
You always said to me,
"We'll be together until our hair turns gray, then die together",
so how could you go and leave without me?
Whom should I and our child turn to; how should we live?
How could you leave us all behind and go on your own?
How did you feel about me,
and how did I feel about you?
Each time we lay
to bed together,
I asked you "Dear, do other people love and cherish each other as we do?
Are they like us?"
How could you forget my words
and abandon me?
I cannot live without you.
I want to go to you quickly, so please take me to you.
I cannot forget the feelings I had for you in this life,
there is no limit to my sorrow.
Where do I put these feelings that I have,
while raising a child that misses their father?
Please read this letter, then come to me in my dreams and reply to me in detail.
I wrote this letter because I want to hear your detailed response in my dreams.
Please read this closely and tell me.
You told me that after our child was born, you would "see and have something to say".
When the child in my womb is born, whom will they call "father"?
Is there anyone who can comprehend my feelings?
Is there any other such tragedy under the sky?
You are just somewhere else,
are you really as sad as I am?
There's so much more I want to say, but I can only write a rough outline.
Please read this letter carefully and come speak to me in my dreams.
I believe I will be able to see you.
Please come secretly and show me.

== Legacy ==
The letter is seen as having historical value. Cho argues that it mostly offers insights into the lives of the elite at the time. The text was written in vernacular Korean. The word choice Wŏn's mother employs has been described as fairly equitable; for example, the term janae (자내), referring to Yi, was used to refer to equals. This reflects the relatively equal social status of wives during this part of the Joseon period, which gradually declined by the 17th century. Yi is also believed to have been living with his wife's family at the time, which was then common practice. This later became uncommon and frowned upon, as wives were expected to move in with their husbands. Strong expressions of emotion were frowned upon by the elite due to their Korean Confucian values. The letter was almost certainly meant to be private.

The letter is now widely known in South Korea. Information about the letter was published in the November 2007 issue of National Geographic, and was printed in the March 2009 edition of the archaeology journal Antiquity. A statue of Wŏn's mother was constructed and placed at the former site of the tomb. The story of the couple has been fictionalized in various media, including a 2009 opera entitled "Won's Mother" (원이 엄마), a 2012 musical entitled "Won's Mother", and a 2014 4D animated film entitled Mituri. In 2009, it was reported that many visitors to the Andong National University museum were members of the Goseong Yi clan who wanted to see the letter.
