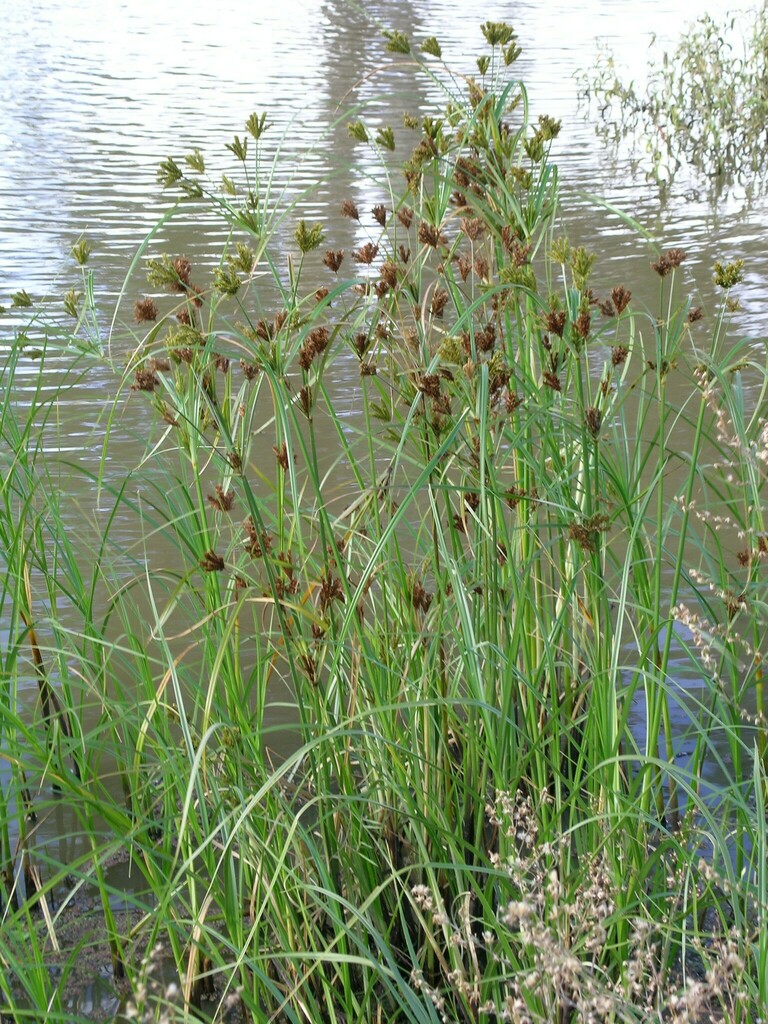

Scientific classification
- Kingdom: Plantae
- Clade: Tracheophytes
- Clade: Angiosperms
- Clade: Monocots
- Clade: Commelinids
- Order: Poales
- Family: Cyperaceae
- Genus: Cyperus
- Species: C. exaltatus

Binomial name
- Cyperus exaltatus Retz., 1788

= Cyperus exaltatus =

Species of sedge

Cyperus exaltatus is a species of sedge that is native to parts of the Africa, Asia, Argentina and Australia. It was first described in 1788 by Anders Jahan Retzius.

It grows in shallow water and the edges of streams and lakes.

== Uses ==
In Korea, it is known as Wanggol (왕골) and is grown and has been grown as a crop in all regions. It is cultivated in rice fields.

The inside of the stem is made up of colorless cells with large spaces between them, making the stem very elastic. The stems are split and dried to make seats, cushions, and hats, while the inside is dried to make shoes, baskets, and ropes. The leaves are also used for making paper.

== See also ==
- List of Cyperus species
