= List of items traditionally worn in Japan =

This is a list of items of clothing, as well as clothing accessories, traditionally worn in Japan. These include items worn in both formal and informal situations, such as the kimono and happi coats, as well as items reserved for auspicious, ceremonial and/or religious occasions.

Members of the Imperial family on formal occasions, geisha, maiko, and sumo wrestlers wear variations on common traditional accessories that are not found in everyday dress, such as certain types of kimono. As an extension of this, many practitioners of Japanese traditional dance wear similar kimono and accessories to geisha and maiko.

For certain traditional holidays and occasions, some specific types of kimono accessories are worn. For instance, yukata are worn to festivals, and okobo and furisode are worn by girls for shichi-go-san and young women on seijin no hi (Coming of Age Day). A slightly taller, plainer variation of okobo are also worn by maiko in some areas of Japan throughout their apprenticeship.

== C ==
Chihaya (襅/千早)
An item of clothing worn only by kannushi and miko in some Shinto shrine ceremonies.

== D ==
Datejime (伊達締め) or Datemaki (伊達巻き)
A wide undersash used to flatten and keep in place the kimono and/or the nagajuban when tied. Datejime can be made of a variety of fabrics, including silk, linen and elastic.

== F ==
Fā (ファー)
The Japanese term for a fur collar, boa, stole, or even a muff, worn over a kimono. White fur stoles are usually worn by young women on their Coming of Age Day, whereas other colours are likely to be worn by older women to keep warm.
Futokorogatana (懐刀)
Translating as "chest sword", a small dagger held in a small, decorative brocade-fabric purse tucked into the collar of a woman's wedding kimono. Similar to a kaiken.

== G ==
Geta (下駄)
Wooden thong sandals. Geta are usually made of a lightweight wood such as paulownia, and come in a variety of styles, such as ama geta ("rain geta", covering the feet) and tengu geta (with just one prong on the sole instead of two). Geta are typically worn with yukata and other casual kimono, or traditionally, in bad weather.

== H ==
Hachimaki (鉢巻)
A traditional Japanese headband, worn to keep sweat off of one's face. Hachimaki are typically made of cotton, sometimes featuring a printed design. In Japanese media, it is used as a trope to show the courage of the wearer, symbolising the effort put into their strife, and in kabuki, when appearing as a purple headband tied to the left, it can symbolise a character sick with love.
Hadagi (肌着, lit. 'underwear')
Underwear, specifically referring to a kimono-style undershirt and trousers, or skirt slip, in the context of kimono. Hadagi are sometimes worn only in cold weather as a base layer. The hadagi usually features tube sleeves, or is sleeveless, and is tied shut with ties attached to it at the front openings. Hadagi are made of either linen, silk crepe, or cotton. Historically, hadagi were worn by the samurai classes, mainly during the Sengoku period (16th century).
Hadajuban (肌襦袢)
A thin, nagajuban-style garment, considered to be "kimono underwear" and worn underneath the nagajuban. Hadajuban have tube-shaped sleeves and are worn with a slip-like wrap tied around the waist. Hadajuban are not always worn underneath kimono, and may be substituted for a t-shirt and shorts in the modern day.
Hakama (袴)
A divided (umanori-bakama (馬乗り袴)) or undivided (andon-bakama (行灯袴)) 'skirt', which resembles a wide pair of trousers. Hakama were historically worn by both men and women, and in modern-day can be worn to a variety of formal (for women) and informal (for men) events. A hakama is typically pleated at the waist and fastened by waist ties over the obi. Shorter kimono may be worn underneath the hakama for ease of movement. Hakama are worn in several budō arts such as aikido, kendo, iaidō and naginata. They are also worn by Miko in Shinto shrines. See also mo-bakama (裳袴).
Hakama boots (袴ブーツ)
A pair of boots (leather or faux leather), with low-to-mid heels, worn with a pair of hakama. Boots are a style of footwear that came to Japan from the West during the Meiji period (1868–1912); worn by women while wearing a hakama, optional footwear worn by young women, students and teachers at high-school and university graduation ceremonies, and by young women out celebrating their Coming of Age at shrines, often with a hakama with furisode combination.
Hakoseko (筥迫/箱迫, lit. 'boxy narrow thing')
A small box-shaped billfold accessory; sometimes covered in materials to coordinate with the wearer's kimono or obi. Fastened closed with a cord, and carried tucked-within a person's futokoro, the space within the front of kimono collar and above the obi. Used for formal occasions that require traditional dress, such as a traditional Shinto wedding or a child's Shichi-Go-San ceremony. Originally used for practical uses, such as carrying around a woman's beni ita (lipstick), omamori (an amulet/talisman), kagami (mirror), tenugui (handkerchief), coins, and the like, it now has a more of a decorative role.
Hanten (袢纏/半纏, lit. 'half-wrap')
The worker's version of the more formal haori, typically with narrow, tube-shaped sleeves. As winterwear, it is often padded for warmth, giving it insulating properties, as opposed to the somewhat lighter happi. It could be worn outside in the wintertime by fieldworkers out working in the fields, by people at home as a housecoat or a cardigan, and even slept-in over one's bedclothes.
Haori (羽織)
A hip- or thigh-length kimono-like overcoat with straight, rather than overlapping, lapels. Haori were originally worn by men until they were popularised as women's wear as well by geisha in the Meiji period. The jinbaori (陣羽織) was specifically made for armoured samurai to wear.
Haori himo (羽織紐)
A tasseled, woven cord fastener for haori. The most formal colour is white.
Happi (法被)
A type of overcoat traditionally worn by shop keepers, sometimes as uniform by employees of the shop (not unlike a propaganda kimono, but for advertising business), typically with brightly-coloured designs in white, red and blue, often featuring text in Edomoji. The happi is now associated mostly with festivals.
Haramaki (腹巻, lit. 'belly wrap')
Items of Japanese clothing that cover the stomach. They are worn for health, fashion and superstitious reasons.
Hifu (被布)
Originally a kind of padded over-kimono for warmth, this has evolved into a sleeveless over-kimono like a padded outer vest or pinafore (also similar to a sweater vest or gilet), worn primarily by girls on formal outings such as the Shichi-Go-San ceremony for children aged seven, five, and three.
Hiōgi (檜扇)
An elaborate cypress wood hand fan used in the Heian period, which could be tied together by tassels tied onto the end fan bones. These fans were made of cypress wood entirely, with the design painted onto the wide, flat bones themselves.
Hirabitai (平額)
A decoration, part of a kamiagegu, and similar to a kanzashi, worn on the front of the hair, above the forehead, held into the hair by pins worn by Edo-era aristocratic women in court, like a tiara, with their jūnihitoe robes. See also tenkan (below).
Hitatare (直垂)
A traditional two-piece set of clothing worn in some form since the early Heian period, consisting of a long-sleeved robe tucked into hakama trousers, where the robe opening in front is tied closed with a cord, and the sleeves each have a drawstring at the opening to cinch them up as needed.
Horo (母衣)
A type of cloak or garment attached to the back of the armour worn by samurai on the battlefields of feudal Japan.

== I ==
Inro (印籠)
A traditional Japanese case for holding small objects, suspended from the obi worn around the waist when wearing kimono. They are often highly decorated, in a variety of materials and techniques, often using lacquer. (See also netsuke and ojime).

== J ==
Jika-tabi (地下足袋)
A modification of the usual split-toe tabi sock design for use as a shoe, complete with rubber sole. Invented in the early 20th century.
Jinbei (甚平)
Traditional loose-woven two-piece clothing, consisting of a robe-like top and shorts below the waist; the seams connecting the sleeves to the body are traditionally loosely-sewn, showing a slight gap. Worn by men, women, boys, girls, and even babies, during the hot, humid summer season, in lieu of kimono.
Jittoku (十徳)
A style of haori, formerly more widespread but in modern times generally worn only by male practitioners of tea ceremony. Jittoku are made of unlined silk gauze, fall to the hip, and have sewn himo ties at the front made of the same fabric as the main garment. The jittoku has a wrist opening that is entirely open along the sleeve's vertical length. The garment originated in the late Kamakura period (1185–1333 CE).
Jūnihitoe (十二単, lit. 'twelve layers')
The layered garments worn by court ladies during the Heian period. The jūnihitoe consisted of up to, or above, twelve layered garments, with the innermost garment being the kosode, worn as underwear underneath a pair of hakama. An entire jūnihitoe ensemble could weigh up to 20 kg (44 lb). The garments were decorated with large motifs, and considerable attention was paid to the seasonality of garment colour combinations, with a number of named combinations recorded in various texts, such as Sei Shonagon's The Pillow Book. No extant garments from the Heian period survive, and today the jūnihitoe can only be seen as a reproduction in museums, movies, festivals and demonstrations. The Imperial Household still officially uses them at some important functions, such as the coronation of the new Empress.

== K ==
Ka (架, lit. 'rack')
A rack or stand used for holding and displaying kimono.
Kappōgi (割烹着, lit. 'cooking wear')
A type of gown-like apron; first designed to protect kimono from food stains, it has baggy sleeves, is as long as the wearer's knees, and fastens with strips of cloth ties that are tied at the back of the neck and the waist. Particularly used when cooking and cleaning, it is worn by Japanese housewives, lunch ladies, and cleaners.
Kanzashi (簪)
Kanzashi are hair ornaments used in traditional Japanese hairstyles. A variety of kanzashi are used on different occasions as a means of symbolism: for maiko, certain types of kanzashi are used in accompaniment with different hairstyles to symbolise the progression of their apprenticeship, the seasons and special events such as New Years'. Geisha also wear different kanzashi, though theirs are more subdued and follow seasonality, occasion or personal taste. In bridalwear, kanzashi made of tortoiseshell or faux-tortoiseshell are worn with a takashimada wig. These kanzashi are a matching set, and typically include a highly-decorated kushi comb and kogai hair stick, and a number of bira-bira-style kanzashi, often decorated with flowers in either tortoiseshell or metal and coral or coral-substitute.
Kasa (傘)
A traditional Japanese oil-paper umbrella or parasol, these umbrellas as typically crafted from one length of bamboo split finely into spokes. See also Gifu umbrellas.
Kimono (着物)
Traditional square-cut wrap-around garment.
Kimono slip (着物スリップ, kimono surippu)
A one-piece undergarment combining the hadajuban and the susoyoke.
Kinchaku (巾着)
A traditional Japanese drawstring bag or pouch, worn like a purse or handbag (vaguely similar to the English reticule), for carrying around personal possessions. A kind of sagemono.
Koshihimo (腰紐, lit. 'hip cord')
A narrow strip of fabric used to tie the kimono, nagajuban and ohashori in place while dressing oneself in kimono. They are often made of silk or wool.
Kosode (小袖)
A traditional short-sleeved Japanese garment, and the direct predecessor of the kimono. Though its component parts directly parallel those of the kimono, its proportions differed, typically having a wider body, a longer collar and narrower sleeves. The sleeves of the kosode were typically sewn to the body entirely, and often featured heavily rounded outer edges. The kosode was worn in Japan as common, everyday dress from roughly the Kamakura period (1185–1333) until the latter years of the Edo period (1603–1867), at which a point its proportions had diverged to resemble those of modern-day kimono; it was also at this time that the term kimono, meaning "thing to wear on the shoulders", first came into use when referring to the garment formerly known as the kosode.
Kyahan (脚絆)
Traditional Japanese leg-wrappings, similar to leggings or a Western soldier's gaiters (and, in modern times, is used as the Japanese word for Western soldier's gaiters), worn by the samurai class and their retainers in feudal Japan.

== M ==
Michiyuki (道行き)
A traditional Japanese overcoat (not to be confused with a haori or a hifu), characterised with a signature square neckline formed by the garment's front overlap. It is fastened at the front with snaps or buttons, and is often worn over the kimono for warmth, protection from the weather or as a casual housecoat. Some michiyuki will include a hidden pocket beneath the front panel, and they are typically thigh- or even knee-length. Michiyuki worn by maiko and geisha may not have a square front neckline, instead having a regular kimono neckline with a black satin collar.
Mo-bakama (裳袴)
Not to be mistaken with the divided (umanori-bakama (馬乗り袴)) or undivided (andon-bakama (行灯袴)) 'skirt', which resembles a wide pair of trousers, mo-bakama were like wrap-skirts, historically worn by women, similar to an apron.

== N ==
Nagajuban (長襦袢, lit. 'long under-robe')
A long under-kimono worn by both men and women beneath the main outer garment, sometimes simply referred to as a juban. Since silk kimono are delicate and difficult to clean, the nagajuban helps to keep the outer kimono clean by preventing contact with the wearer's skin (paralleling the European petticoat). Only the collar edge of the nagajuban shows from beneath the outer kimono. Many nagajuban have removable collars, to allow them to be changed to match the outer garment, and to be easily washed without washing the entire garment. They are often as beautifully ornate and patterned as the outer kimono. Since men's kimono are usually fairly subdued in pattern and colour, the nagajuban allows for discreetly wearing very striking designs and colours.
Nemaki (寝間着)
A unisex cotton robe resembling a yukata, but with tube-shaped sleeves. Nemaki are commonly given as guest clothing at inns, and are worn as sleepwear.
Netsuke (根付/根付け)
An ornament worn suspended from the men's obi, serving as a toggle or counterweight for hanging containers and pouches (sagemono).(See also inro and ojime).

== O ==
Obi (帯)
A belt, waist-wrap or sash of varying sizes, lengths and shapes worn with both traditional Japanese clothing and uniforms for Japanese martial arts styles. Originating as a simple thin belt in Heian period Japan, the obi developed over time into a belt with a number of different varieties, with a number of different sizes and proportions, lengths, and methods of tying. The obi, which once did not differ significantly in appearance between men and women, also developed into a greater variety of styles for women than for men.
Obi-age (帯揚げ)
A scarf-like sash worn tied above the obi, either knotted or tucked into the garment's collars. The obi-age has the dual purpose of hiding the obi-makura and providing a colour contrast against the obi. Obi-age are often silk, and are typically worn with more formal varieties of kimono. Obi-age can be plain-dyed silk, but are often decorated with shibori tie-dyeing; for maiko, obi-age are only ever red with a gold or silver foil design.
Obidome (帯留め)
A decorative fastening accessory piece, strung onto the obijime. For maiko, the obi-dome is commonly the most expensive part of the outfit, as they are usually hand-made from precious stones and metal such as gold or silver. Some obijime are woven specially to allow the obi-dome to be pinned on.
Obi-ita (帯板)
A thin, stiff board, commonly inserted behind the obi at the front, helping to give a smooth, uniform appearance.
Obijime (帯締め)
A decorative woven or padded cord (often kumihimo) used to assist in tying more complex bows with the obi, also worn as simple decoration on the obi itself. It can be tied at the front, and the ends tucked into the band itself, or tied at the back, in the case of being worn with an obi-dome.
Obi-makura (帯枕)
Padding used to put volume under the obi knot (musubi); to support the bows or ties at the back of the obi and keep them lifted. An essential part of the common taiko musubi ("drum knot").
Ojime (緒締め)
A type of bead used to fasten a obijime in place, like a cordlock. They are also worn between the inrō and netsuke and are typically under an inch in length. Each is carved into a particular shape and image, similar to the netsuke cordlock, though smaller.
Okobo (おこぼ)
Also referred to as pokkuri, bokkuri, or koppori geta (all onomatopoeic terms taken from the sound okobo make when walking), are traditional Japanese wooden sandals worn by young girls for Shichi-Go-San, young women during Coming of Age Day, and apprentice geisha in some regions of Japan.

== S ==
Samue (作務衣)
A two-piece wrapped-front garment appearing similar to a jinbei (above), but with longer sleeves and trouser legs, and without the loosely-woven and -sewn fabric and construction. The samue is everyday clothing for a male Zen Buddhist lay-monk, and the favoured garment for komusō monks playing the shakuhachi.
Sarashi (晒し)
Sarashi is Japanese for 'bleached cloth', usually cotton, or less commonly linen. Such cloth may be wrapped around the body (under a kimono), usually around the chest (similar to a girdle or a bandeau). Sometimes it is wrapped around below the belly during pregnancy, or around the waist after the birth of a child. It is used by men and women. The whiteness and purity of the cloth has ritual significance, therefore it may also be used in rituals.
Sensu (扇子)
A handheld folding fan, generally made of washi paper coated in paint, lacquer or gold leaf, with bamboo spines. As well as being used for cooling-off, sensu fans are used as dancing props, and are often worn tucked into the obi. For use in bridalwear, sensu in either entirely gold or silver leaf are worn tucked into the obi.
Setta (雪駄)
A flat, thick-bottomed sandal made of bamboo and straw with leather soles, and with metal spikes protruding from the heel of the sole to prevent slipping on ice.
Suikan (水干)
An informal garment, like a tunic, worn by males of the Japanese nobility in the Heian period, as outerwear; originally made from cloth that had been stretched and dried using only water and no starch. In the present day, the suikan is worn by members of Japanese nobility for some formal ceremonies.
Susoyoke (裾除け)
A thin half-slip-like piece of underwear, like a petticoat, worn by women under their nagajuban.
Suzu (鈴)
A round, hollow Shinto bell. They are somewhat like a jingle bell in form, though the materials produce a coarse, rolling sound. Suzu come in many sizes, ranging from tiny ones on good luck charms (called omamori (お守り)) to large ones at shrine entrances. As an accessory to kimono wear, suzu are often part of kanzashi.

== T ==
Tabi (足袋)
Ankle-high, divided-toe socks usually worn with zōri or geta.
Tasuki (襷)
A pair of sashes that loop over each shoulder and across the back, used for holding up kimono sleeves when working.
Tenkan (天冠, lit. 'divine crown' or 'heavenly crown')
A design of golden-filigree crown worn by Buddha and celestial beings, such as Tennyo (below). Also worn by imperial princesses in the Heian period; now worn by miko during formal occasions such as festivals. Tenkan is also a name for the triangularly-folded cloth headband worn by yūrei in traditional Japanese artwork. See also hirabitai (above).
Tenugui (手拭い, lit. 'hand wiper')
A rectangular piece of fabric, usually cotton or linen, used for a variety of purposes, such as a handkerchief, hand towel and headscarf. Tenugui come in a number of colours and patterns, and are also used as accessories in traditional Japanese dance and in kabuki.
Tsunokakushi (角隠し, lit. 'horn-hiding')
A white headdress worn by some brides in traditional Shinto wedding ceremonies. The tsunokakushi is typically made of white silk, and is worn with the bride's white shiromuku (white uchikake over-kimono), or otherwise with a colourful uchikake. The tsunokakushi, unlike the wata bōshi, does not cover the high topknot of the bride's takashimada-style wig. According to folk etymology, the tsunokakushi was worn to hide the bride's horns of jealousy and selfishness; however, this headdress was originally a simpler cap worn to keep the dirt and dust off a woman's hairstyle when travelling. The custom spread from married women in samurai families in the Muromachi and Momoyama periods, to younger women of lower classes during the Edo period.

== U ==
Uchiwa (団扇)
A type of rigid Japanese fan, typically crafted out of a single length of bamboo split into bones for the fan, and covered with washi paper. The uchiwa is used in summer, and may be worn tucked into the obi.

== W ==
Waraji (草鞋)
Traditional sandals woven from rope, designed to wrap securely around the foot and around the ankle; mostly worn by monks, and previously common footwear for the working classes.
Wata bōshi (綿帽子, lit. 'cotton hat')
A full-coverage hood worn some brides in traditional Shinto weddings. The wata bōshi is always white, and is worn in coordination with a shiromuku. The hood entirely covers the bride's hairstyle, hiding her face from effectively everyone but the groom.

== Y ==
Yumoji (湯文字)
A traditional kimono undergarment; a simple wrap-around skirt, worn with a susoyoke.

== Z ==
Zōri (草履)
Traditional sandals worn by both men and women, similar in design to flip-flops. Their formality ranges from strictly informal to fully formal. They are made of many materials, including cloth, leather, vinyl and woven bamboo, and can be highly decorated or very simple.

== See also ==
- Glossary of Shinto
