= Hifu (garment) =

Kind of Japanese jacket

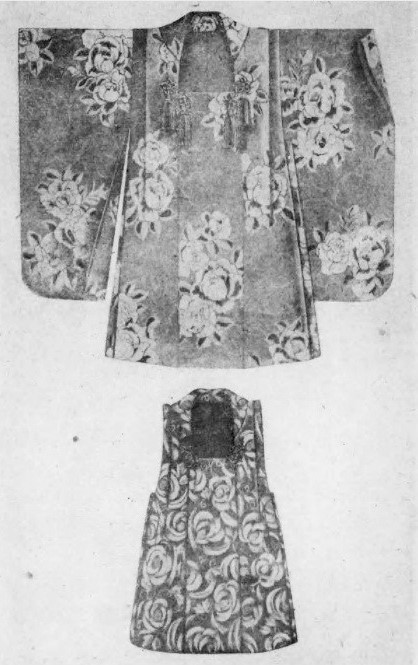
Sleeved and sleeveless hifu, both with kata-nue-age, shoulder pleats to take it in to child-size

Hifu (被風, 被布, 披風(ひふ, ひふ, ひふ)) is a kind of jacket traditionally worn over a kimono. Towards the end of the Edo Period (1603–1867), it was worn by men in cultural positions, such as by chajin (tea ceremony masters) and haijin (haiku poets). It later came to be worn by women. Sodenashi hifu are sleeveless and more likely to be worn by children, while sleeved hifu are more often worn by adults. Sleeveless hifu serve as smocks, protecting the clothing underneath, while sleeved hifu are more likely to be worn for warmth. Sleeveless hifu are commonly seen as part of a child's clothing when worn for Shichi-Go-San.

It is the origin of current kimono coat.

== Structure ==
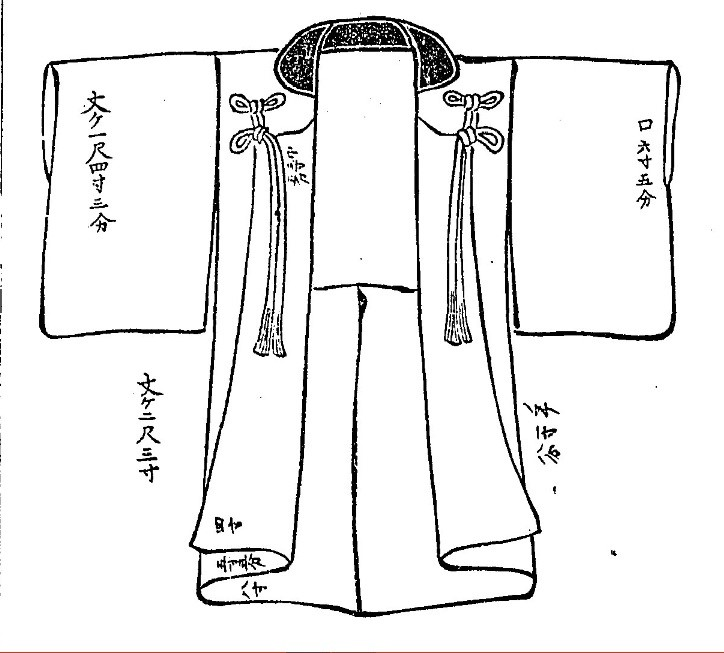
Open

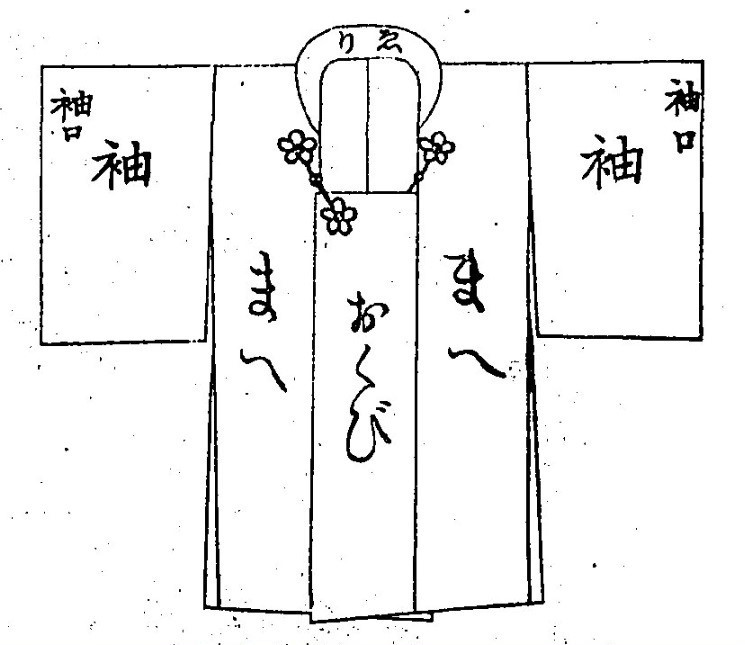
Closed

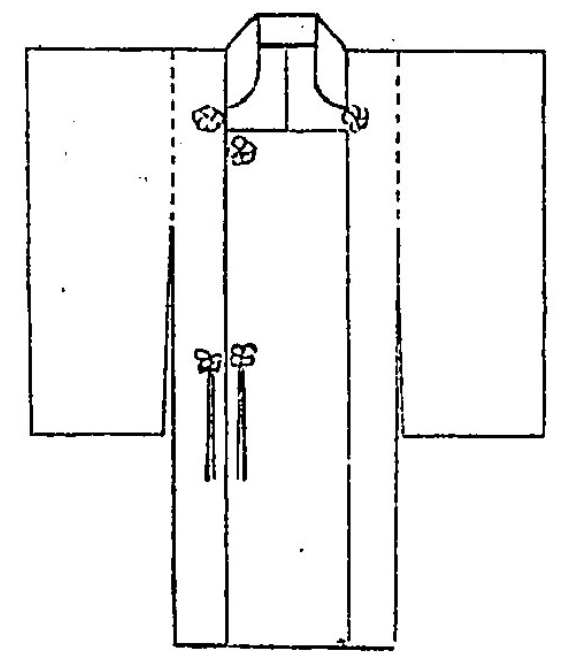
An azuma-coat, tying at the hip, of similar cut

The hifu's shape and use are similar to those of the haori (a wrapped-front kimono coat). Unlike the haori, however, the hifu is a double-breasted coat; the front panels are wide enough to cover the whole chest, and they tie (or button) at the shoulders. Its neckline is square with a flat collar (banryo), not a round collar (marukubi). A hifu may be padded for extra warmth.

Fancy hifu are often made of rinzu (Japanese figured silk satin) and tied with silk braided cords in a chrysanthemum knot. They are worn by young children on the occasion of Shichi-Go-San, as part of an auspicious formal outfit.

== Gallery ==
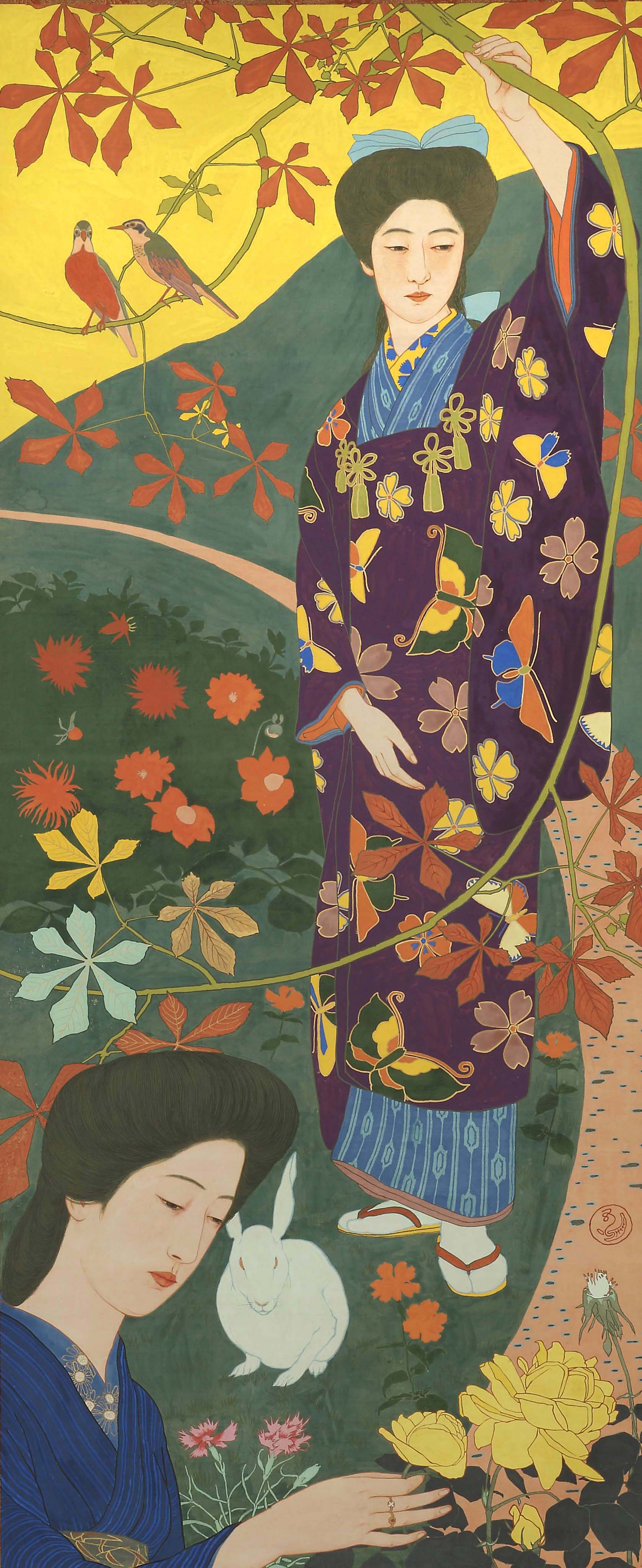
1912

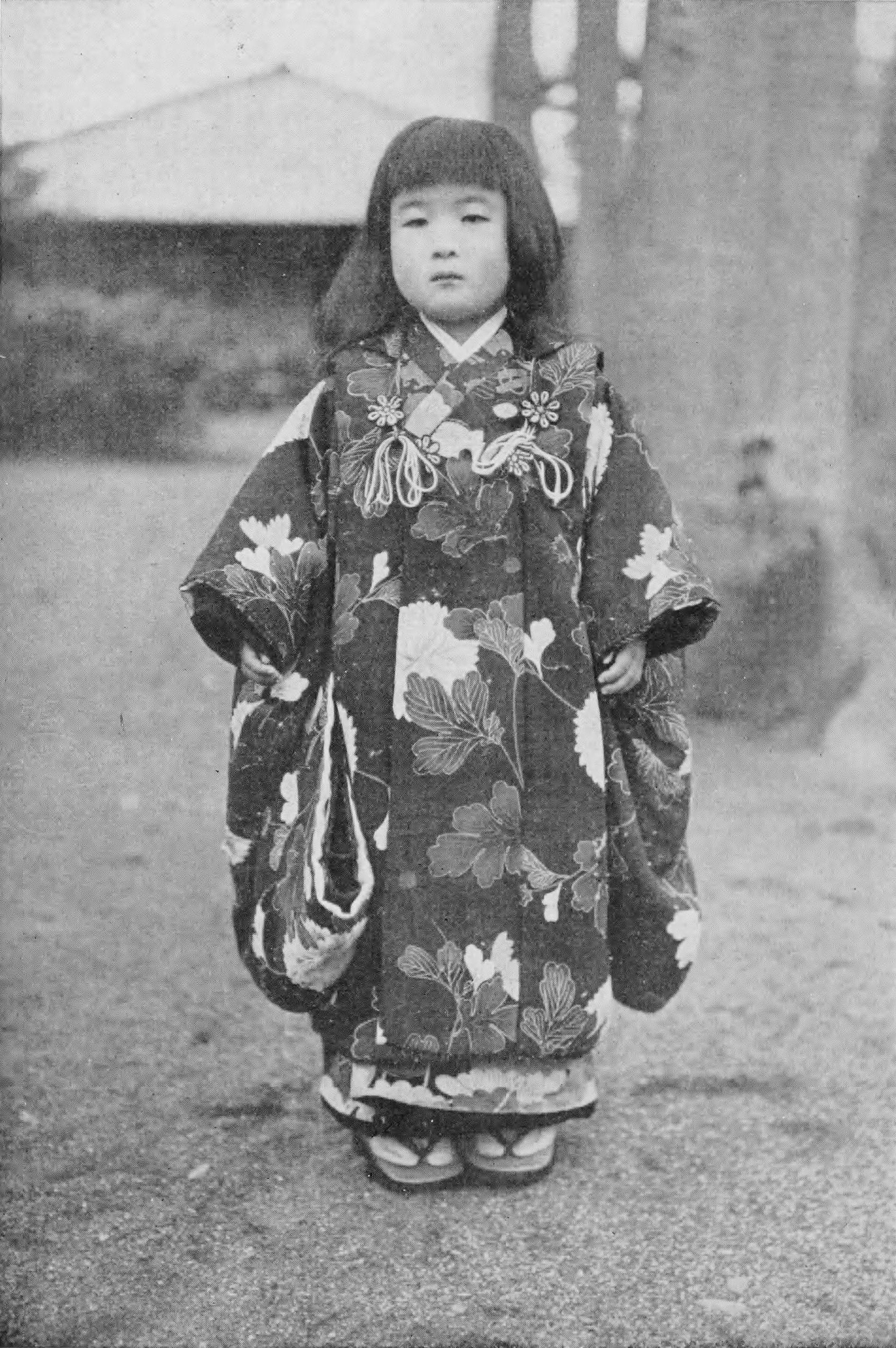
1910s or 1920s

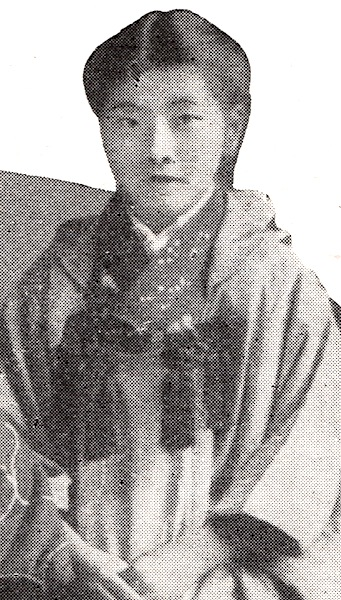
A 1920s hifu with ribbon ties.

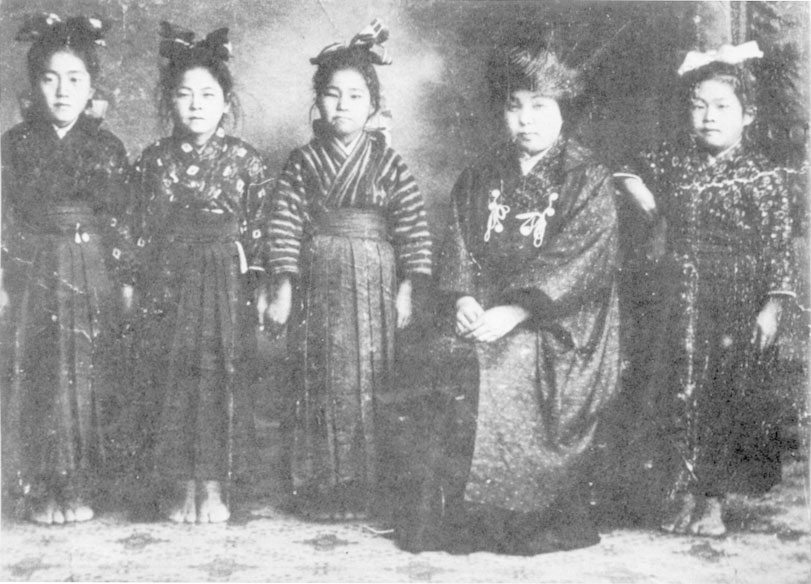
A schoolteacher wearing a hifu with white ties, 1912.

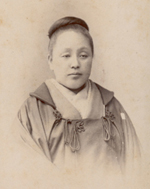
Niijima Yae in a hifu

== See also ==
- Hanten
- Haori
- Happi
- Academic gown, a warm overgarment with a similar historic social role
- List of items traditionally worn in Japan
