= Tasuki =

Tasuki can refer to:

- Tasuki (sash)—A sort of sash that is used to hold up the sleeves on a kimono
- A character in the manga series Fushigi Yûgi
