= Okobo =

Traditional Japanese platform clogs

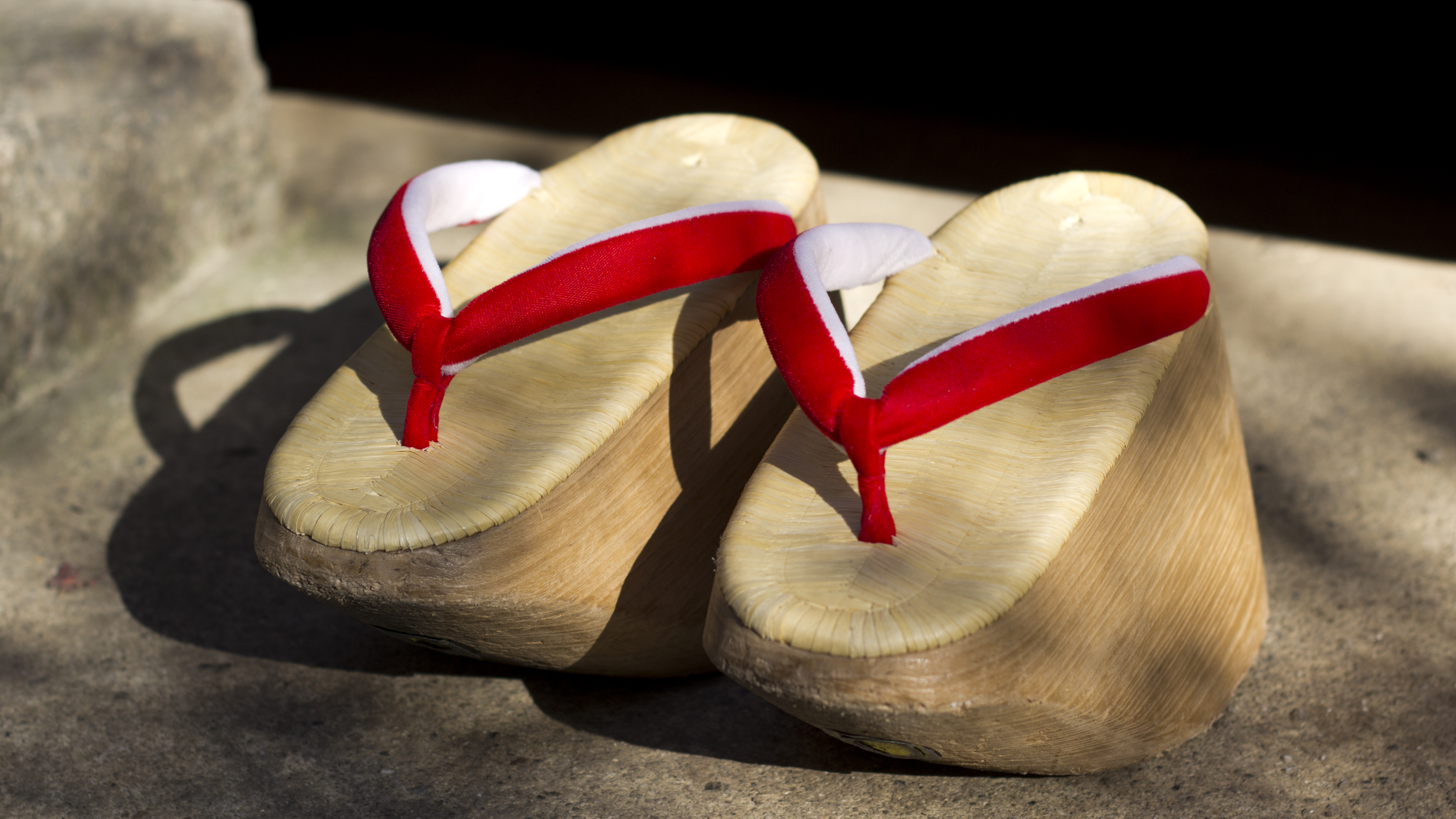
A pair of okobo with a woven bamboo top surface

Okobo (おこぼ), also referred to as pokkuri, bokkuri, or koppori geta (all onomatopoeic terms taken from the sound okobo make when walking), are traditional Japanese wooden sandals worn by young girls for Shichi-Go-San, young women during Coming of Age Day and apprentice geisha in some regions of Japan.

Okobo are typically made from a solid block of paulownia wood, a lightweight hardwood native to East Asia and often cultivated there. Okobo range from 10–15 cm (3.9–5.9 in) tall, and can be decorated, lacquered black or left plain; the plain varieties are not waxed. Okobo are kept on the foot with a thong strap known as the hanao; this is tied to the shoe by the use of knots passed through drilled holes – one at the front of the shoe, through the underside of the slope, and two through the central block of the shoe. The centre of the shoe is drilled out, leaving it hollow, and the ends of the hanao are tied in this hollow. The front knot may hold a small bell in place, and the hole is typically covered with a small metal cover known as the maegane (前金, literally 前 mae, "front" + 金 kane, "metal"). In smaller okobo, the bell is secured by the back two hanao knots.

The okobo worn by apprentice geisha are generally taller than most, being 13–15 cm (5.1–5.9 in) tall, and have either no finish or, in the summer months, a plain black lacquered finish. The okobo worn by young girls and women are generally shorter, and often feature multicoloured, lacquered designs on the sides of the shoe. Okobo worn for Shichi-Go-San celebrations may instead feature brocade fabric decorating the outside of the shoe, with a woven bamboo base (known as tatami omote) on top.

Hanao straps can be made of any material for young women and girls, though they are typically made of brocade fabric, velvet or otherwise decorated silk or polyester silk. For apprentice geisha, hanao are always worn plain, with the colour worn indicating the stage of an apprentice's training: red straps are worn by new apprentices, whereas yellow straps are worn by senior apprentices at the end of their apprenticeship.

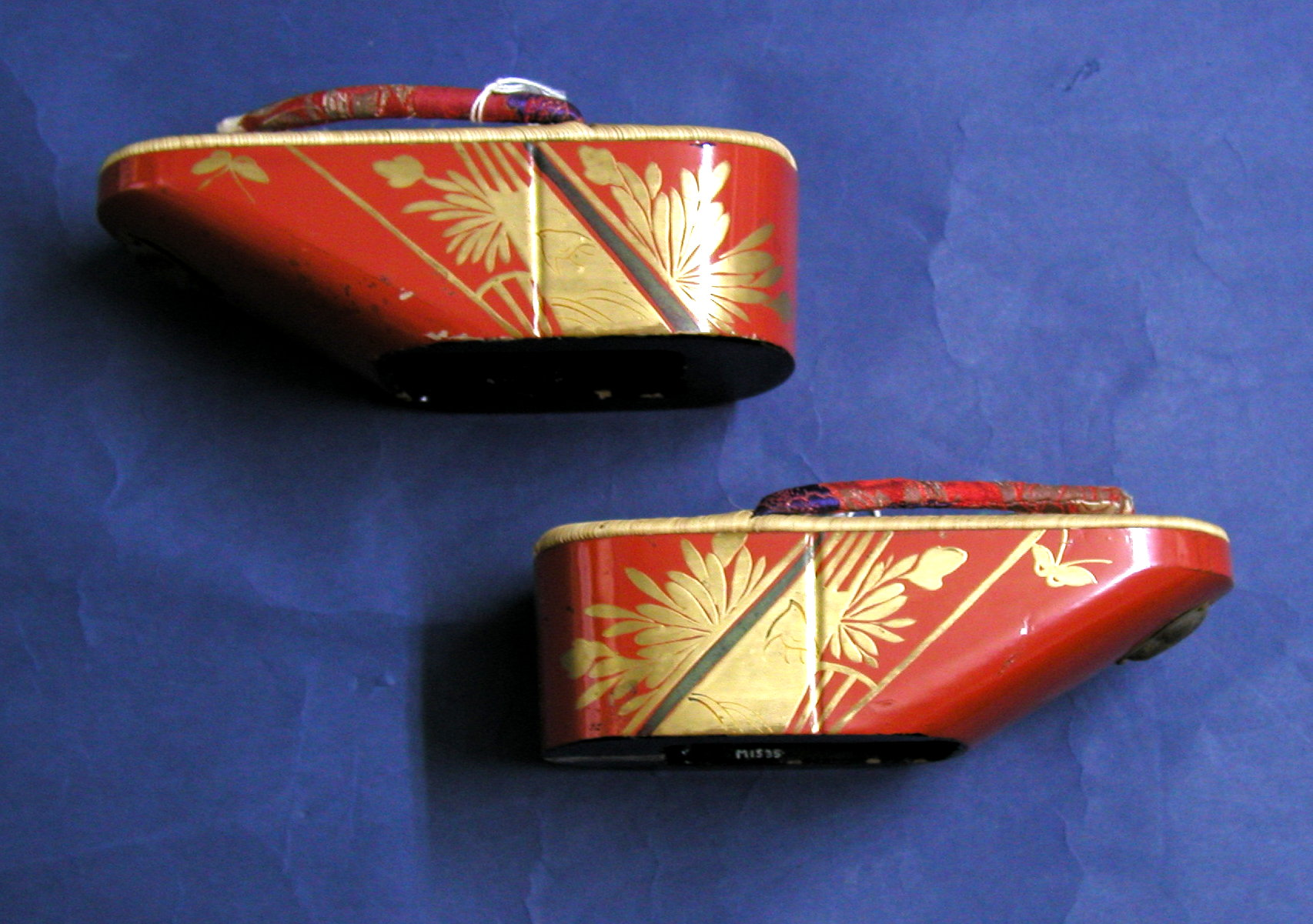
Side view of another pair. Red-gold-green brocade hanao, wood lacquered in red with gold and green decoration

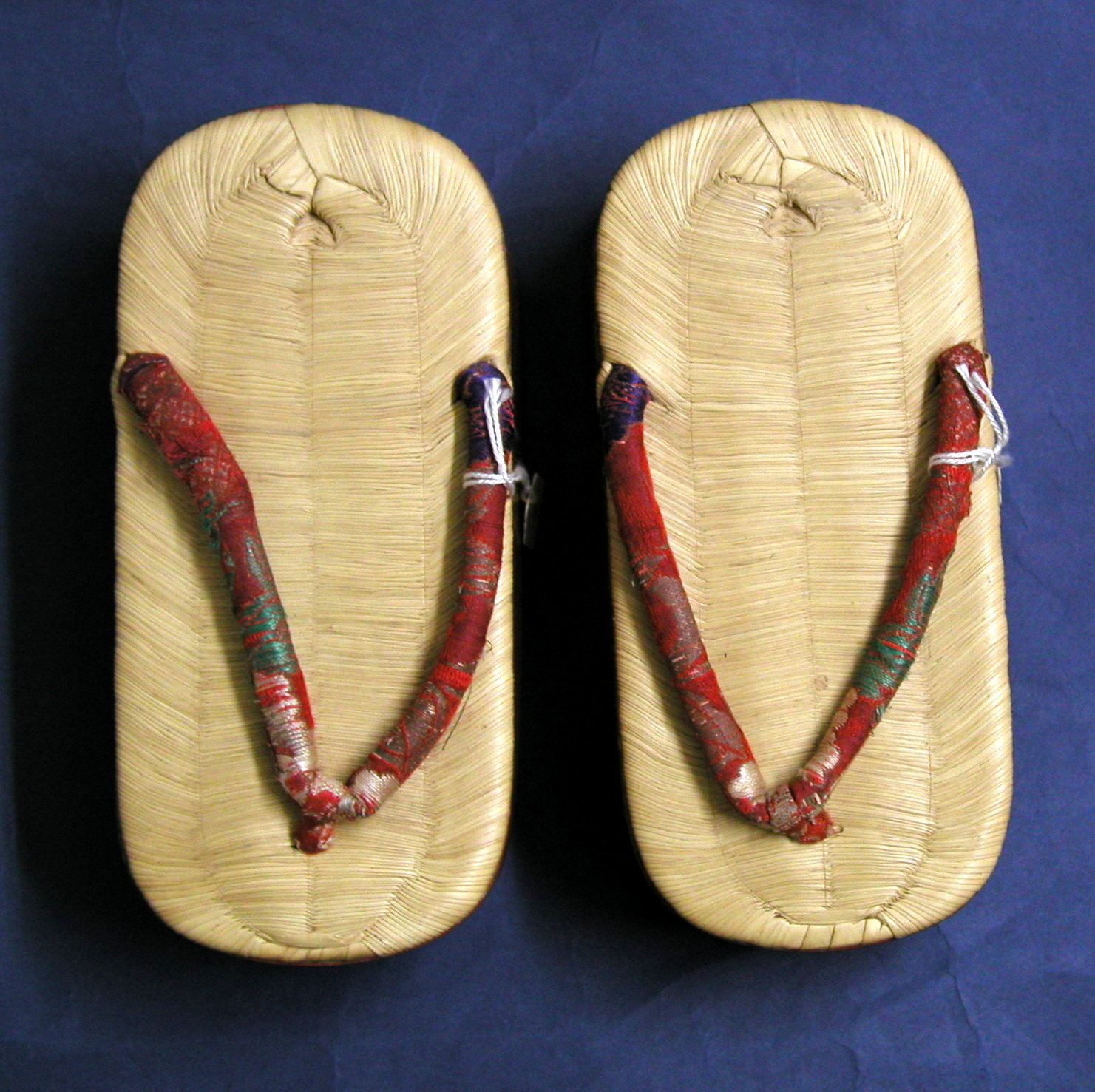
The same pair as adjacent, showing takagawa omote (four-warp woven bamboo-skin topsole; see zōri)

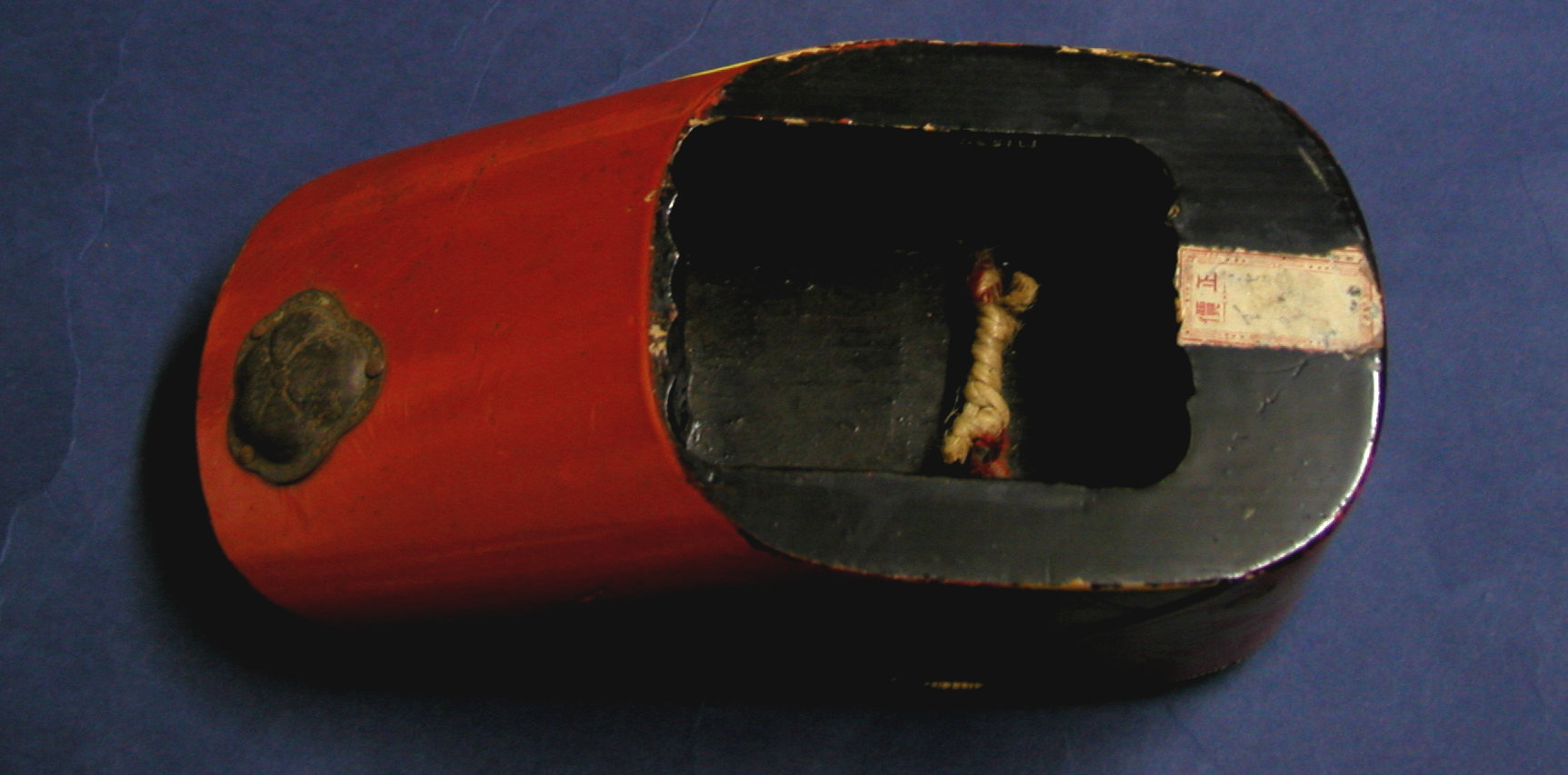
The same pair from below, showing maegane more clearly than side view

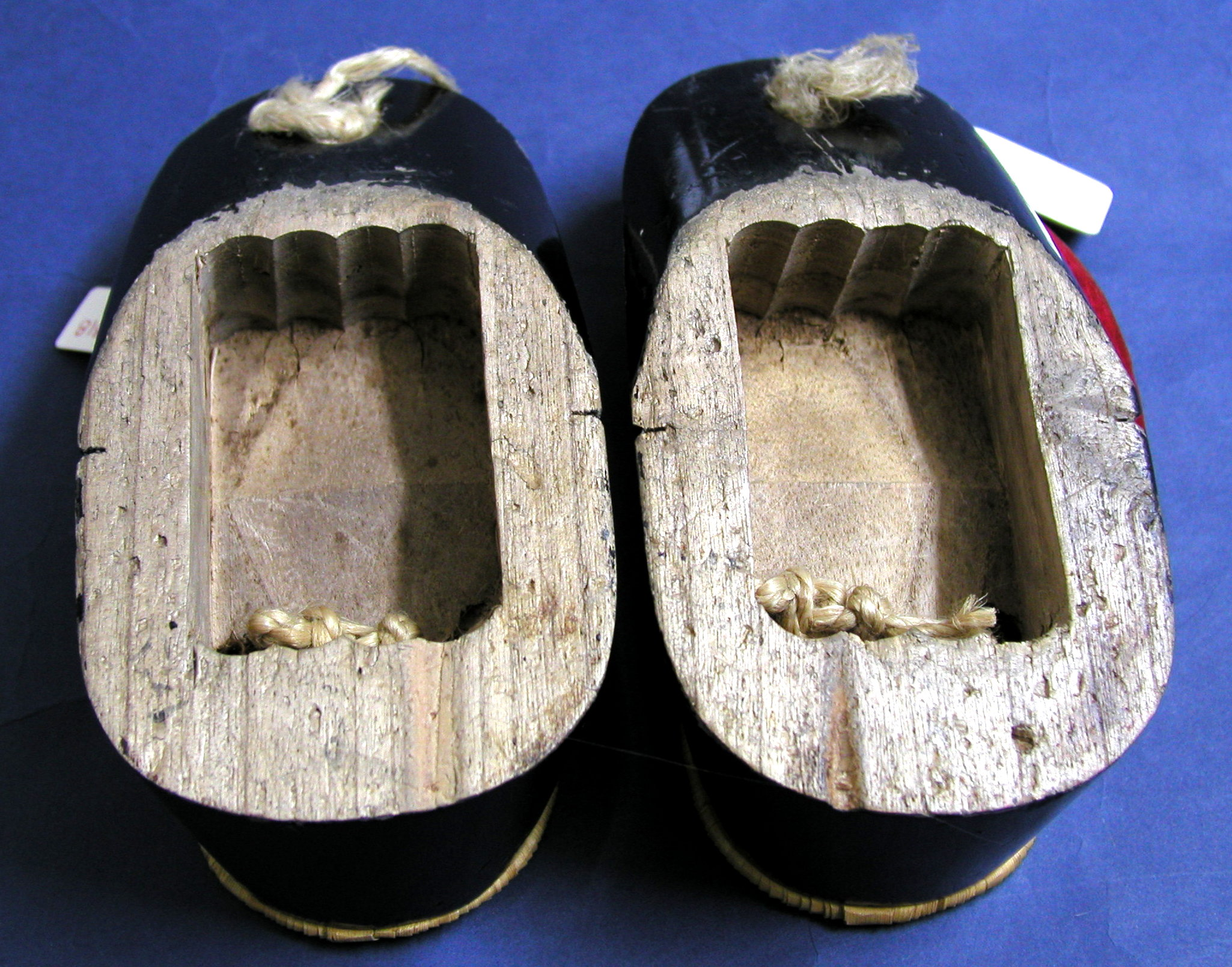
A third pair from below. Black lacquer sides, red plush hanao, no maegane

== See also ==
- Geta
- Flip-flops
- List of items traditionally worn in Japan
- List of shoe styles
- Tabi
- Waraji
