= Geta (footwear) =

Traditional Japanese open-topped wooden sandals

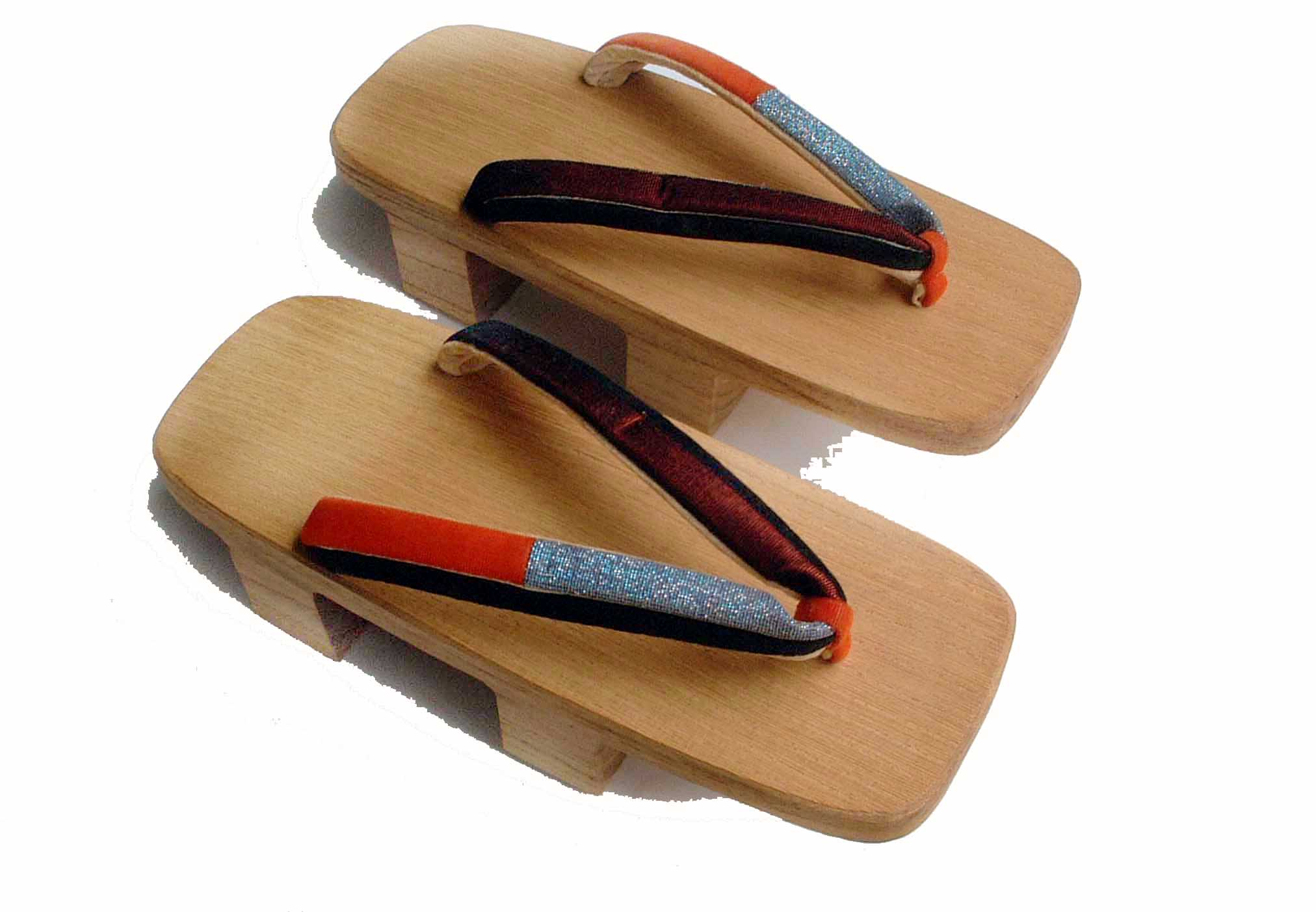
A pair of geta

Geta (下駄) (pl. geta) are traditional Japanese footwear resembling flip-flops. A kind of sandal, geta have a flat wooden base held on the foot with a fabric thong, and are elevated with up to three (though commonly two) "teeth," which keeps the foot raised above the ground.

== History ==
The earliest known pair of geta was excavated in a Neolithic archaeological site near Ningbo, Zhejiang, China, dated to the Liangzhu culture (3400–2250 BCE). These geta differed in construction to modern geta, having five or six holes in place of the modern-day three. The use and popularity of wooden clogs in China has been recorded in other sources dating to between the Spring and Autumn period (771–476 BCE) to the Qin (221–206 BCE) and Han dynasties (202 BCE–220 CE). Geta-style shoes were worn in Southern China likely until sometime between the Ming (1368–1644) and Qing dynasties (1636/1644–1912), when they were replaced by other types of footwear. Also in Korea, wooden shoes similar to geta from the Joseon Dynasty have been unearthed.(Namaksin)

It is likely that geta originated from Southern China and were later exported to Japan. Examples of Japanese geta dating back to the latter part of the Heian period (794–1185) were found in Aomori in 2004, during an excavation along the right bank of the Shinjo river.

Oiran (花魁) – high-ranking courtesans of the feudal period in Japan – wore tall, lacquered koma-geta or mitsu-ashi (lit. 'three legs') when walking in a parade with their attendants. Whereas geisha and maiko wore tabi socks, oiran chose not to, even in winter, as the bare foot against a lacquered clog was considered to be erotic, leaving the toes poking out under their expensive and highly decorated padded kimono.

This style of geta was likely worn as a point of visual distinction between oiran, geisha and their apprentice geisha, as though the former entertained the upper classes, the latter did not, and were considered to be lower-class, despite their immense popularity.

Some seafood and fish merchants also used very high geta with particularly long teeth to keep their feet above any scraps of fish on the floor of their shops; these were known as tengu geta.

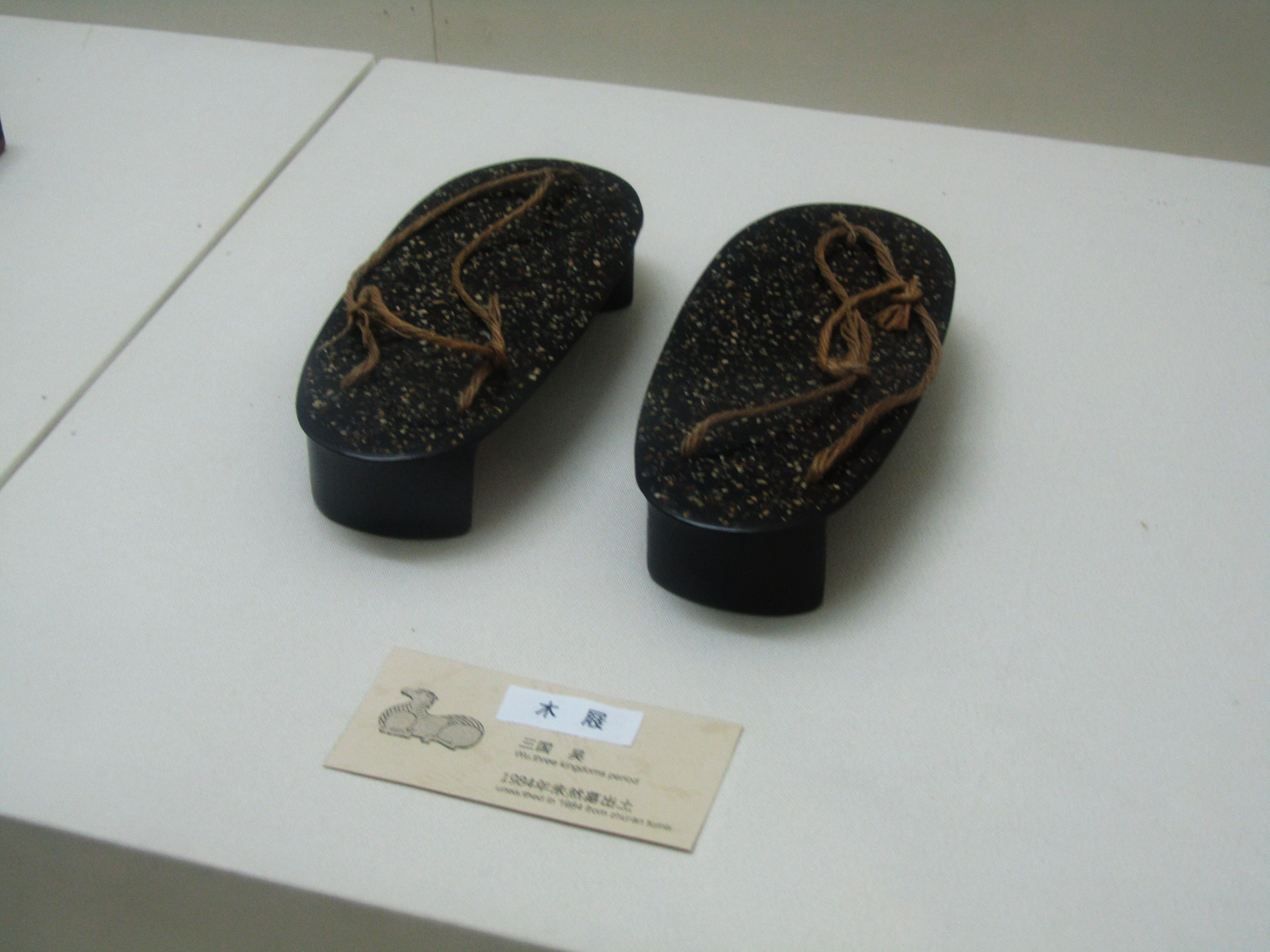
Geta unearthed from the tomb of Zhu Ran from the Three Kingdoms period in China

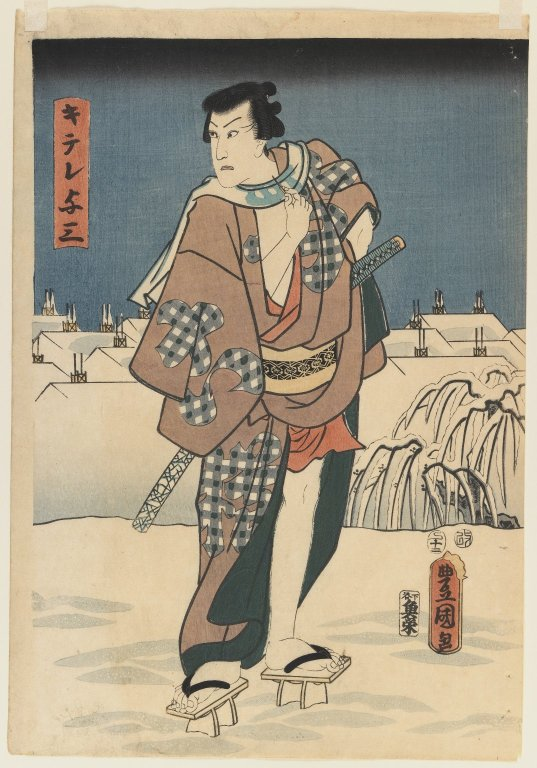
Utagawa Toyokuni III (Kunisada)

== Use ==
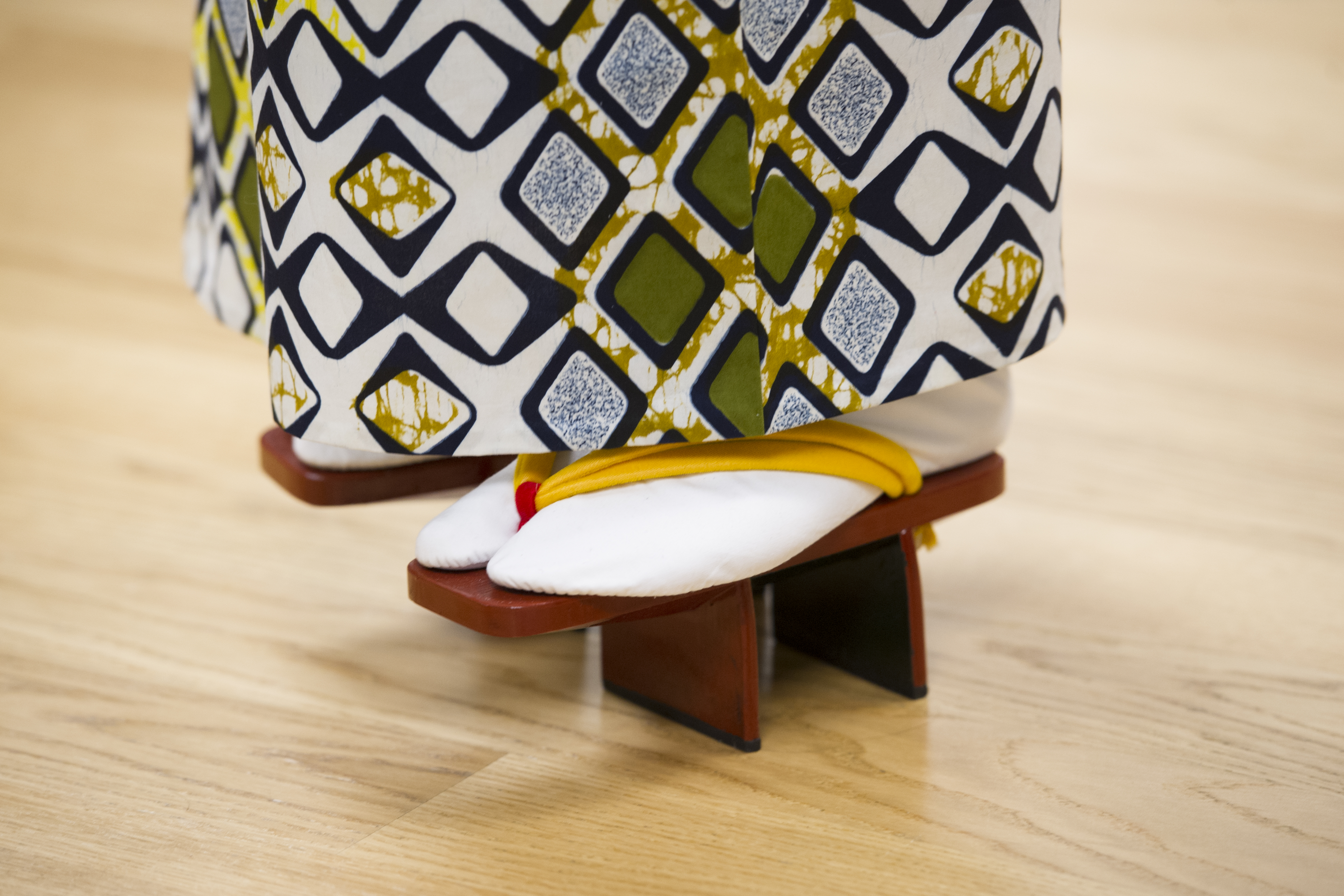
Person wearing geta and tabi

Geta are primarily worn with yukata, but sometimes also with Western clothing during the summer months. As geta are usually worn only with yukata or other informal Japanese clothes or Western clothes, there is no need to wear socks. Ordinarily, people wear slightly more formal zori when wearing tabi.

Geta are worn with the foot overhanging the back and a finger-width of space between the strap and the skin webbing between the toes. The toes pinch the strap to lift the toe of the geta. Wearing them otherwise can make balancing more difficult and blisters more likely.

=== In weather ===
Sometimes geta are worn in rain to keep the feet dry, due to their extra height and impermeability compared to other footwear such as zori. The inflexibility of geta means that water and dirt are not flipped up onto the back of the legs.

Geta are not normally worn in snow, because snow often gets stuck to the teeth of the geta, making it difficult to walk. However, in historical times, they were worn in the snow.

Geta may come with removable toe covers for use in cold, snow and rain. Some even come with ice skating blades.

== Styles ==
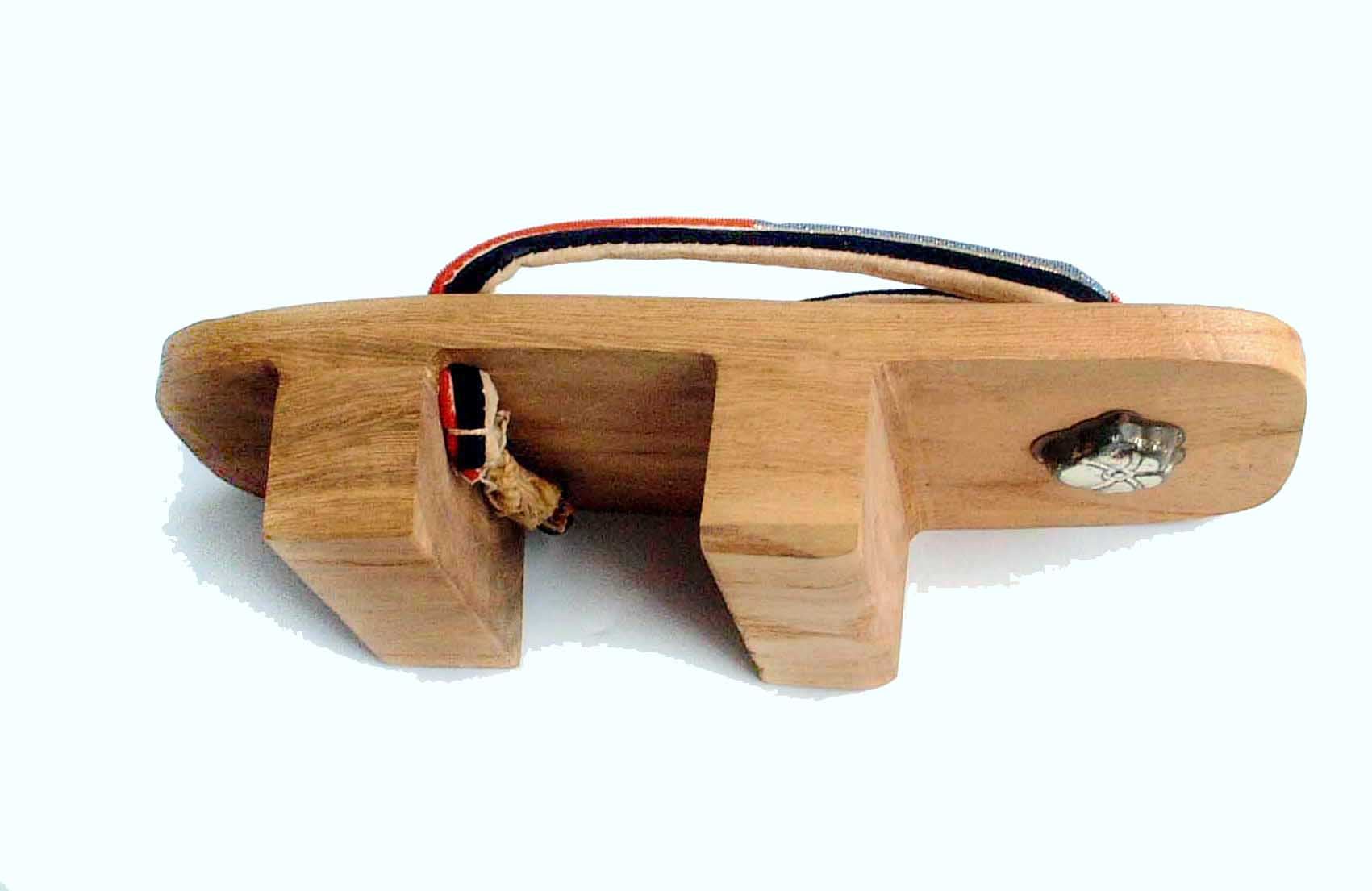
The bottom view, showing the "teeth"

There are several different styles of geta. The most familiar style consists of an unfinished wooden board called a dai (台, lit. 'stand') that the foot is set upon, with a cloth thong (known as the hanao (鼻緒)) passing between the big toe and second toe.

The supporting blocks below the base boards, called the ha (歯, lit. 'tooth'), are also made of wood, usually very light-weight paulownia wood (known as kiri (桐)). If there are two "teeth", the forefront one is placed under the ball of the foot, and the geta pivots on it while walking, while the rear one is placed under the standing center of gravity. The teeth make a distinctive "clacking" sound while walking, referred to as karankoron (カランコロン). This is sometimes mentioned as one of the sounds that older Japanese people miss most in modern life. A traditional saying in Japanese translates as "You don't know until you have worn geta." This means roughly, "you can't tell the results until the game is over."

The original motivation for wearing the high platform shoes was not fashion, but practicality: to keep feet and kimono from coming in contact with things on the ground, such as dirt, filth, water, or snow.

The dai may vary in shape, from oval shapes to more rectangular, with the former being considered more feminine and the latter more masculine. Geta also vary in colour from natural wood to lacquered or wood-stained varieties. The ha may also vary in style; for example, tengu geta have only a single centered "tooth". There are also less common geta with three teeth.

=== Geisha ===
Maiko (geisha in training) wear distinctive tall geta called okobo, which are similar to the chopines worn in Venice during the Renaissance. Very young girls also wear okobo (also called pokkuri and koppori) that have a small bell inside a cavity in the thick sole. These geta have no teeth, but are formed of one piece of wood. The middle part is carved out from below and the front is sloped to accommodate for walking.

Okobo for young girls are usually red in color and are not worn with yukata, but a very fancy kimono, usually the bright, colourful kimono worn for Shichi-Go-San. Okobo are usually worn with tabi socks.

== Construction ==
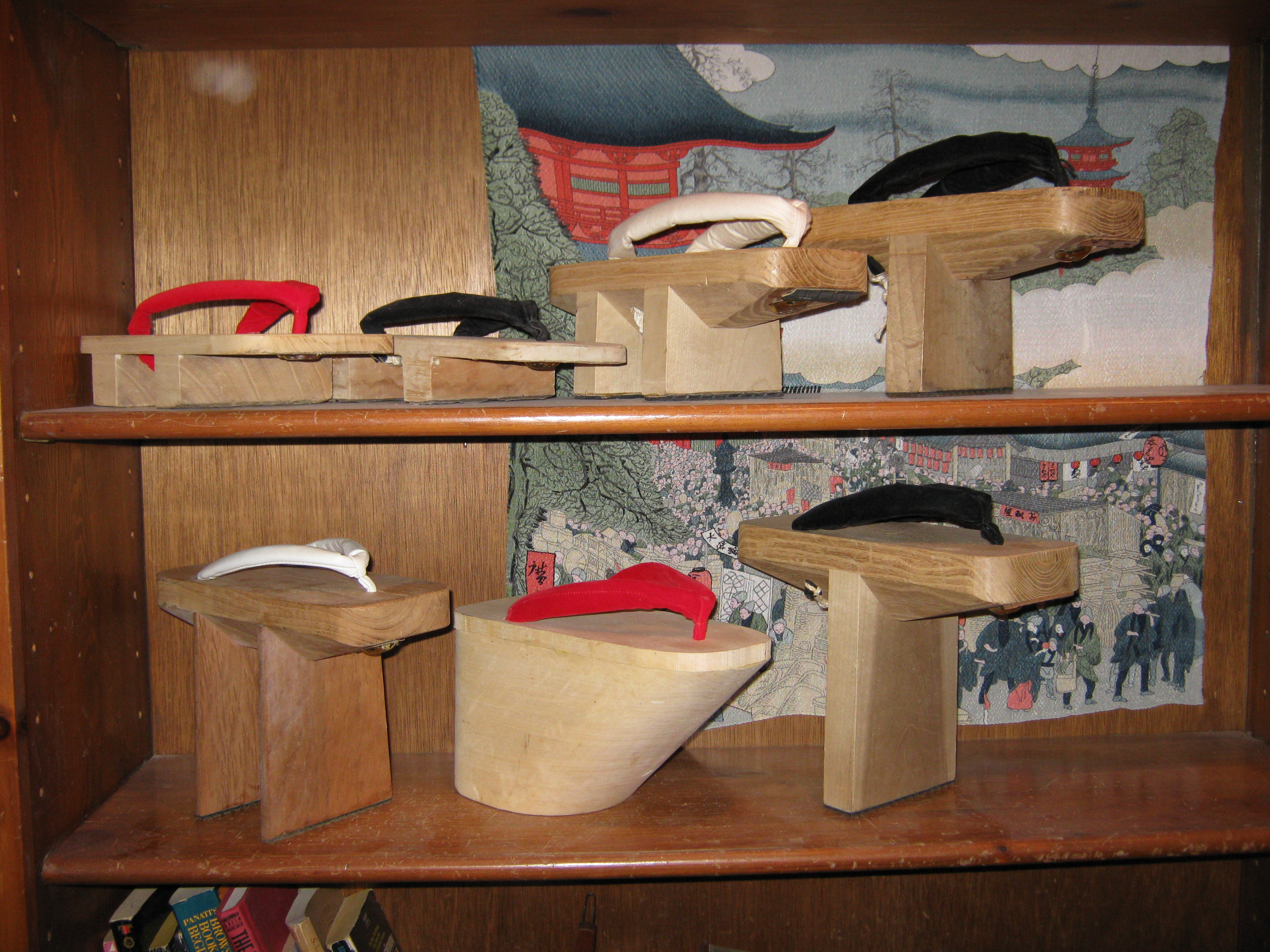
Top: Plain, low (5 cm (2.0 in)) geta with red straps, plain geta with black straps, tall/takai (10 cm (3.9 in)) geta, one-tooth (14 cm (5.5 in)) tengu geta. Bottom: tall (18 cm (7.1 in)) rain/ashida geta, Maiko's okobo (13 cm (5.1 in)), tall (20 cm (7.9 in)) tengu geta.

Geta are made of one piece of solid wood forming the sole and two wooden blocks underneath. These blocks may have a metal plate on the section that touches the ground in order to lengthen the life span of the geta. A V-shaped thong of cloth forms the upper part of the sandal.

The teeth are usually not separate, instead, the geta is carved from one block of wood. The tengu tooth is, however, strengthened by a special attachment. The teeth of any geta may have harder wood drilled into the bottom to avoid splitting, and the soles of the teeth may have rubber soles glued onto them.

The hanao (thong) can be wide and padded, or narrow and hard, and can be made with many sorts of fabric. Printed cotton with traditional Japanese motifs is popular, but there are also geta with vinyl and leather hanao. Inside the hanao is a cord (synthetic in modern times, but traditionally hemp) that is knotted in a special way to the three holes of the dai. In the wide hanao there is some padding as well. It sits between the two first toes because having the thong of rectangular geta anywhere but the middle would result in the inner back corners of the geta colliding when walking. While the hanao are replaceable, according to Japanese superstition, breaking the thong on one's geta is considered very unlucky.

Recently, as Western shoes have become more popular, more Western-looking geta have been developed. They are more round in shape, may have an ergonomically shaped dai, a thick heel as in Western clogs, instead of separate teeth, and the thong at the side as in flip-flops.

== See also ==
- Clog, comparison to similar shoes worldwide
- Flip-flops
- Jika-tabi, traditional split-toe Japanese boots
- List of shoe styles
- Okobo
- Paduka, wooden sandals
- Patten (shoe)
- Sabot (shoe)
- Tabi, traditional split-toe Japanese socks
- Waraji, sandals made from straw rope
- Zōri, another type of traditional Japanese footwear
