= Nemaki =

Unisex tube-sleeved garment

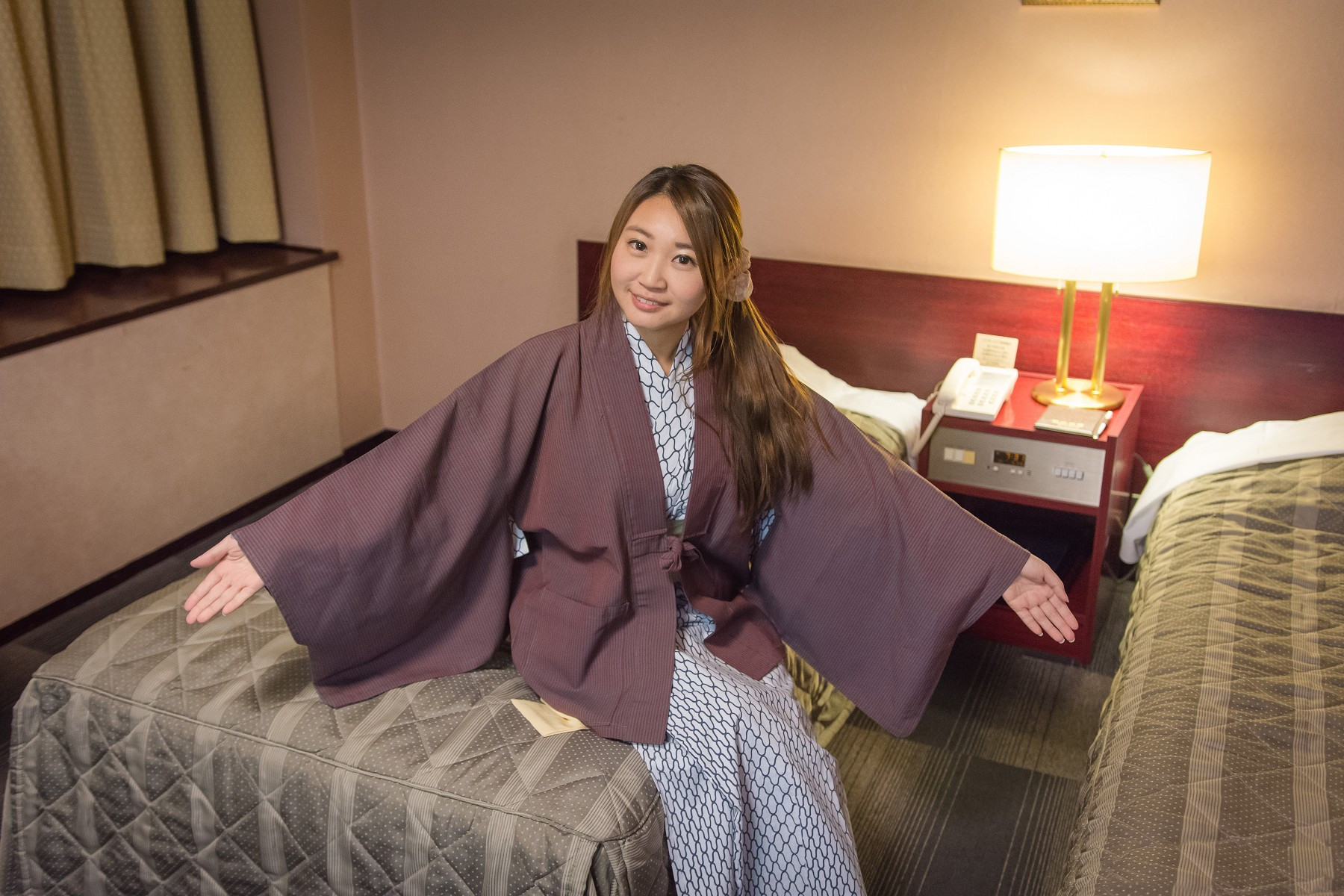
- Woman wearing a nemaki under a traditional haori jacket
- Type: Short-sleeved garment
- Place of origin: Japan

A nemaki (ねまき, lit. 'sleepwear') is a tube-sleeved, unisex Japanese robe worn by guests at traditional ryokan inns, hot spring resorts and spas. It is similar to the yukata in appearance, differing in its unisex sleeve construction, and is typically worn with a thin, unisex obi.

== Design ==
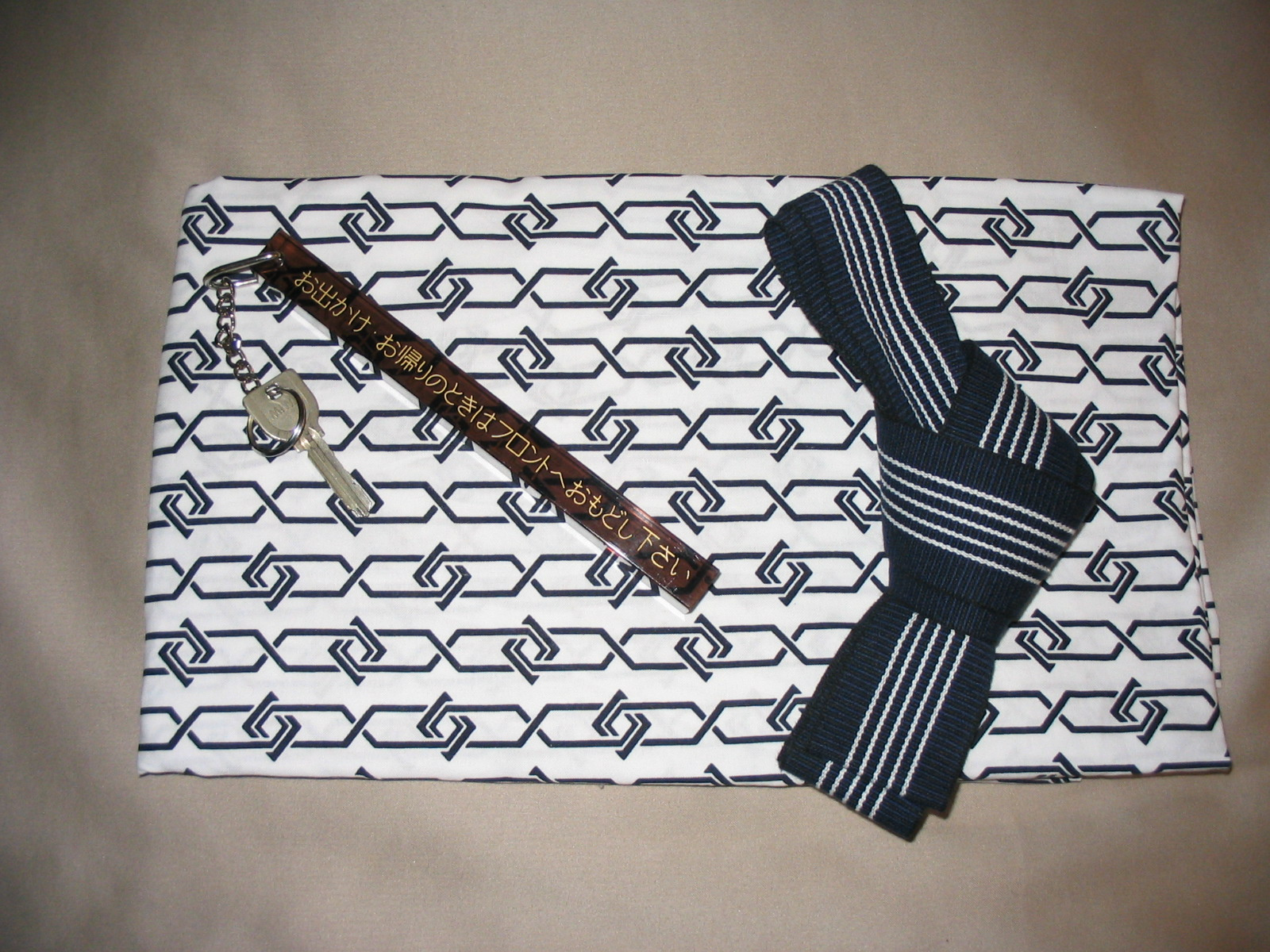
Keihin Hotel nemaki, narrow obi, and key

The nemaki is usually white with a printed geometric or floral pattern, worn with a narrow belt. It is often provided in Japanese hotels as a bathrobe, and is intended to be used indoors only, whereas the yukata may be worn outdoors. In some cases, nemaki are gauze-lined.

The kanji may be written (寝巻) or (寝間着), with the former referring to the bathrobe, and the latter referring to sleepwear in general.

== See also ==
- Kimono
