= Tasuki (sash) =

Sash used for tying kimono sleeves up

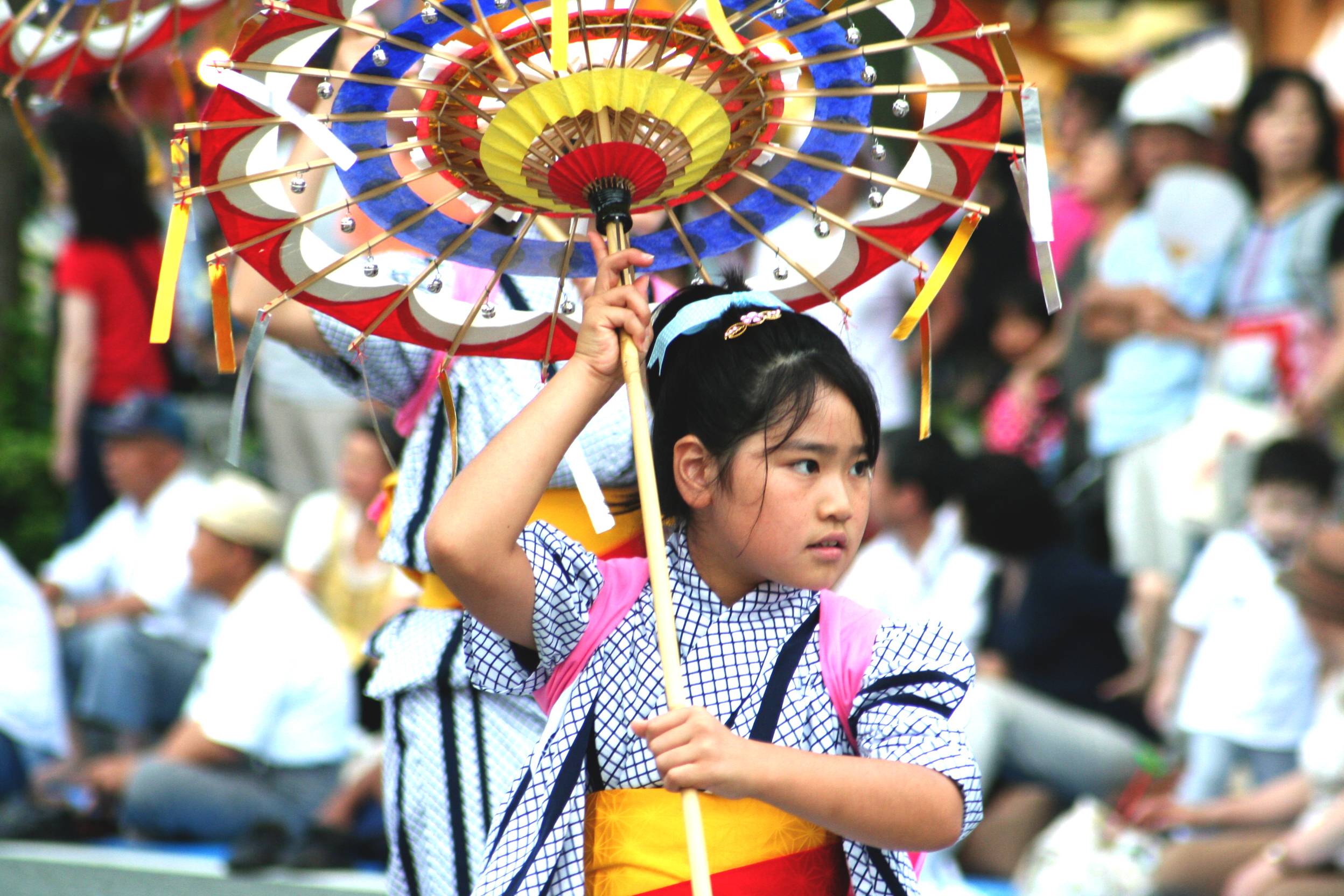
Tasuki as seen from the front at a summer festival

A tasuki (襷/たすき) is a fashion accessory used for holding up the long sleeves of the Japanese kimono. It is a sash made from either cloth or cord that loops over each shoulder and crosses over the wearer's back. The bottom of the kimono sleeves can then be tucked into the loop, holding them back for convenience and functionality.

== Overview ==
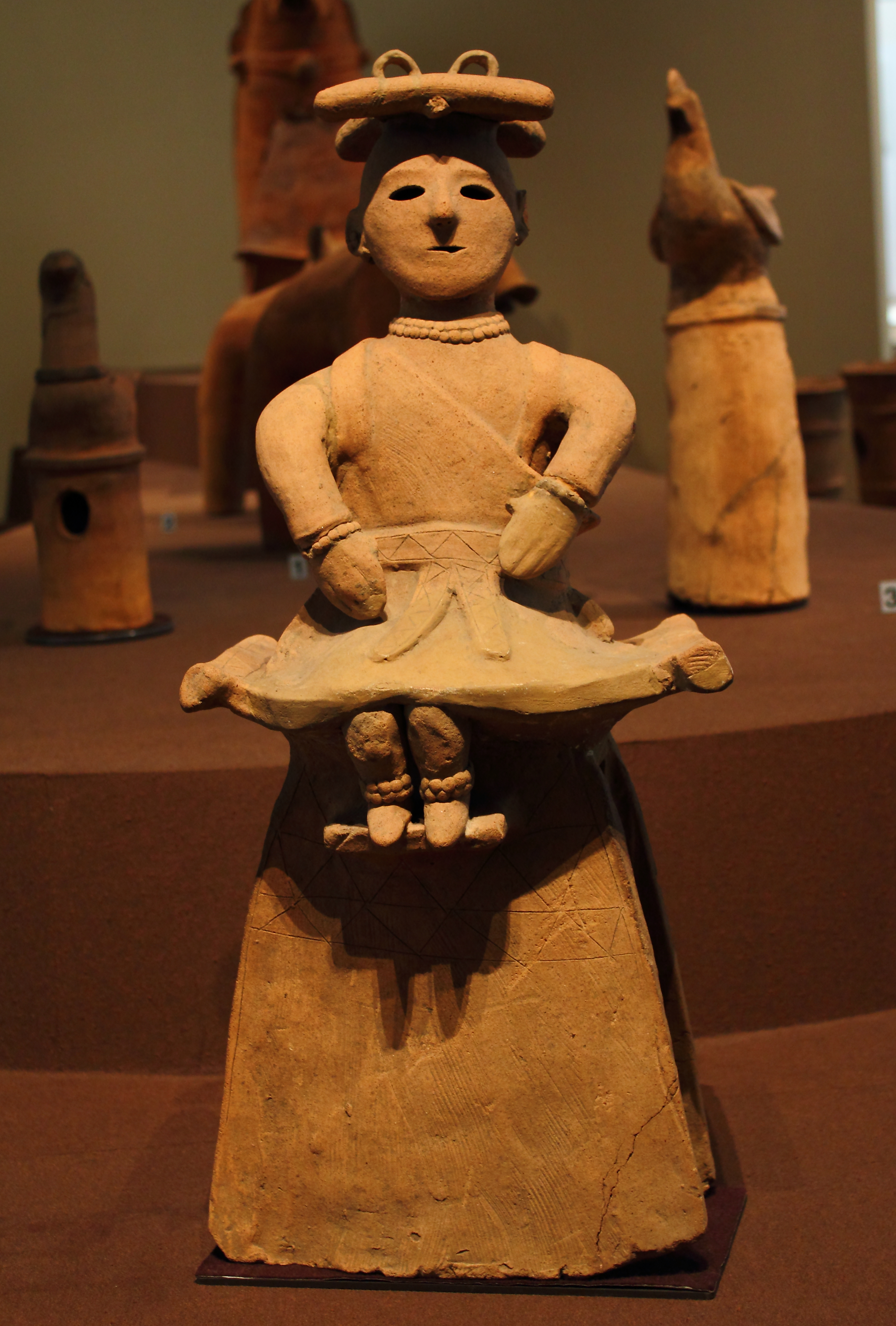
Haniwa depicting a shinto priestess wearing tasuki

In modern Japanese history, tasuki were used by many people as everyday practical accessories, but in ancient Japan they were an exclusive accessory used by the Shinto clergy during ceremonies.

Terracotta Haniwa dating to the Kofun period that were excavated in Gunma Prefecture depict Shinto miko wearing tasuki.

During the Edo period (1603–1867), tasuki were worn by manual laborers for the mobility they would have had if they were not wearing kimono. The tasuki allowed the kimono wearer to work without large sleeves getting in the way of the job, and without risking damage to the garment's sleeves.

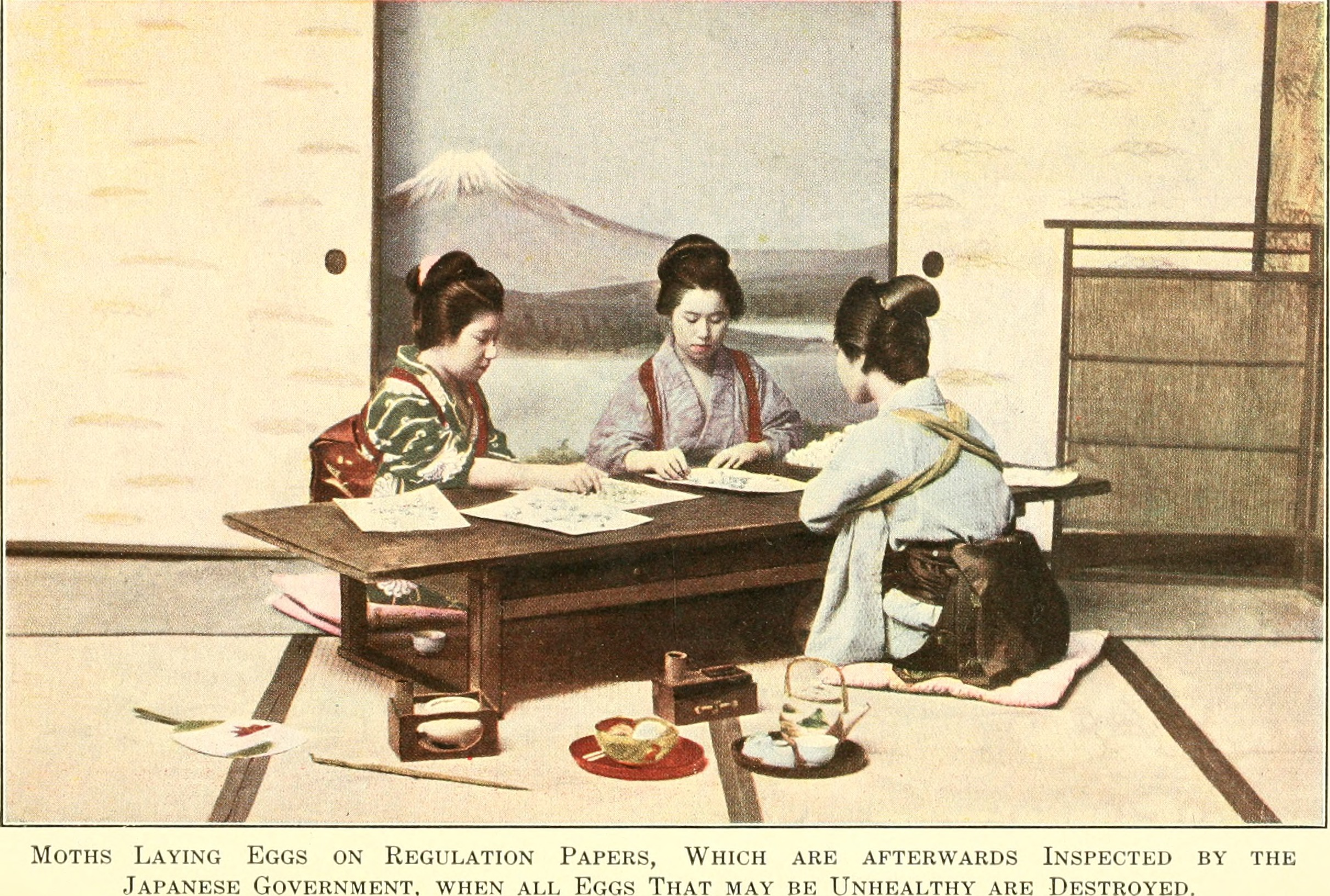
Women wearing tasuki while inspecting silk worm eggs

Tasuki are still used for both practical and aesthetic reasons even for modern wearers of kimono.

People involved in the proceedings of Japanese festivals, such as Japanese traditional dancers at odori festivals or those tasked with pulling the danjiri at the Danjiri Matsuri wear tasuki over their kimono or yukata for unimpeded movement. As many danjiri and odori festivals are held outside during the summer, tasuki also help the wearer keep cool while they work.

Bōsōzoku motorcycle gang members wear tasuki for aesthetic reasons, as a part of their special attack clothing (特攻服, Tokkō-fuku), an attempt to imitate World War II kamikaze pilots.

== See also ==
- List of items traditionally worn in Japan
- Sleeve garter
