= Haori =

Japanese kimono jacket

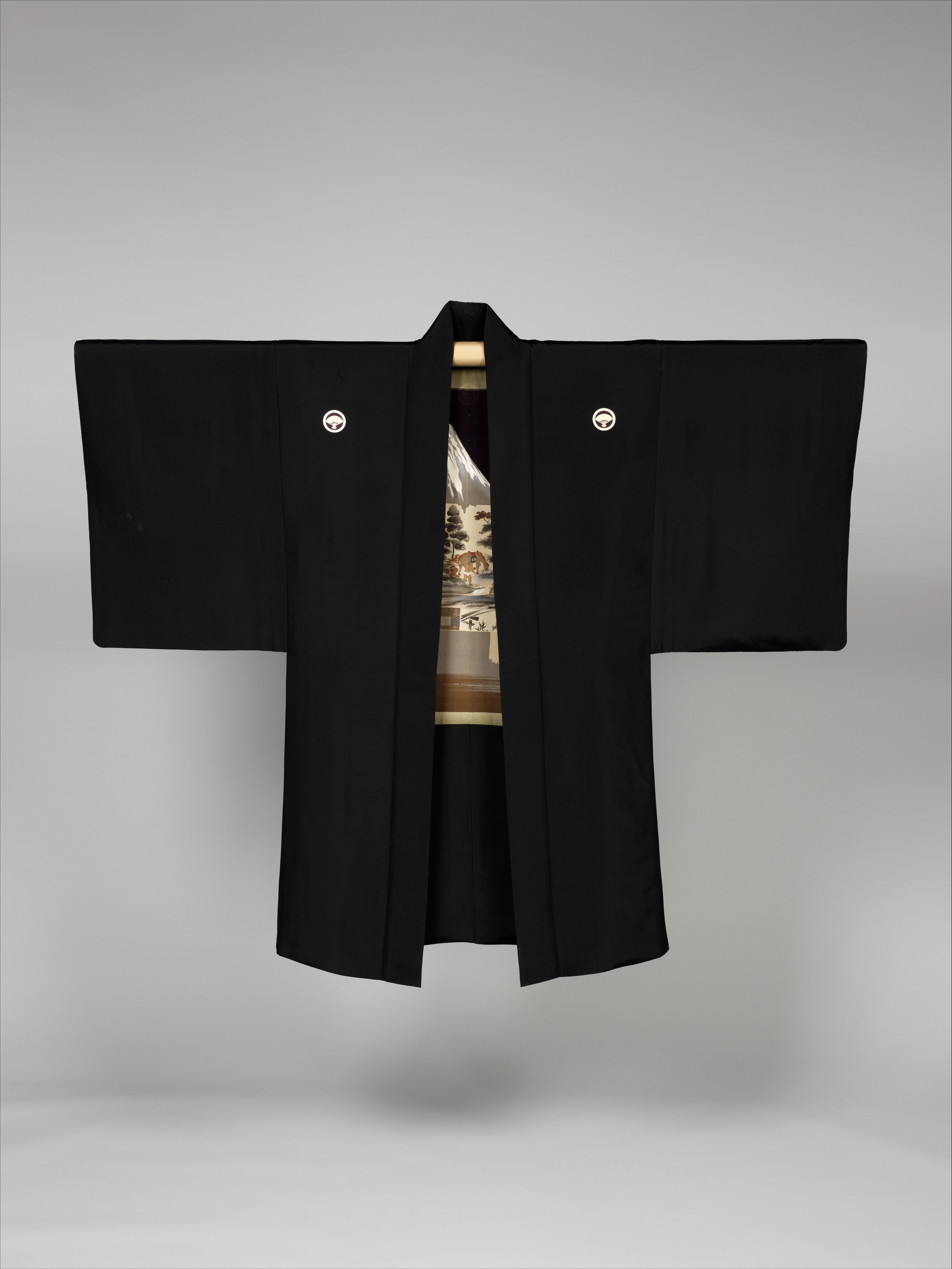
A formal haori with two traditional Japanese emblems visible from the front

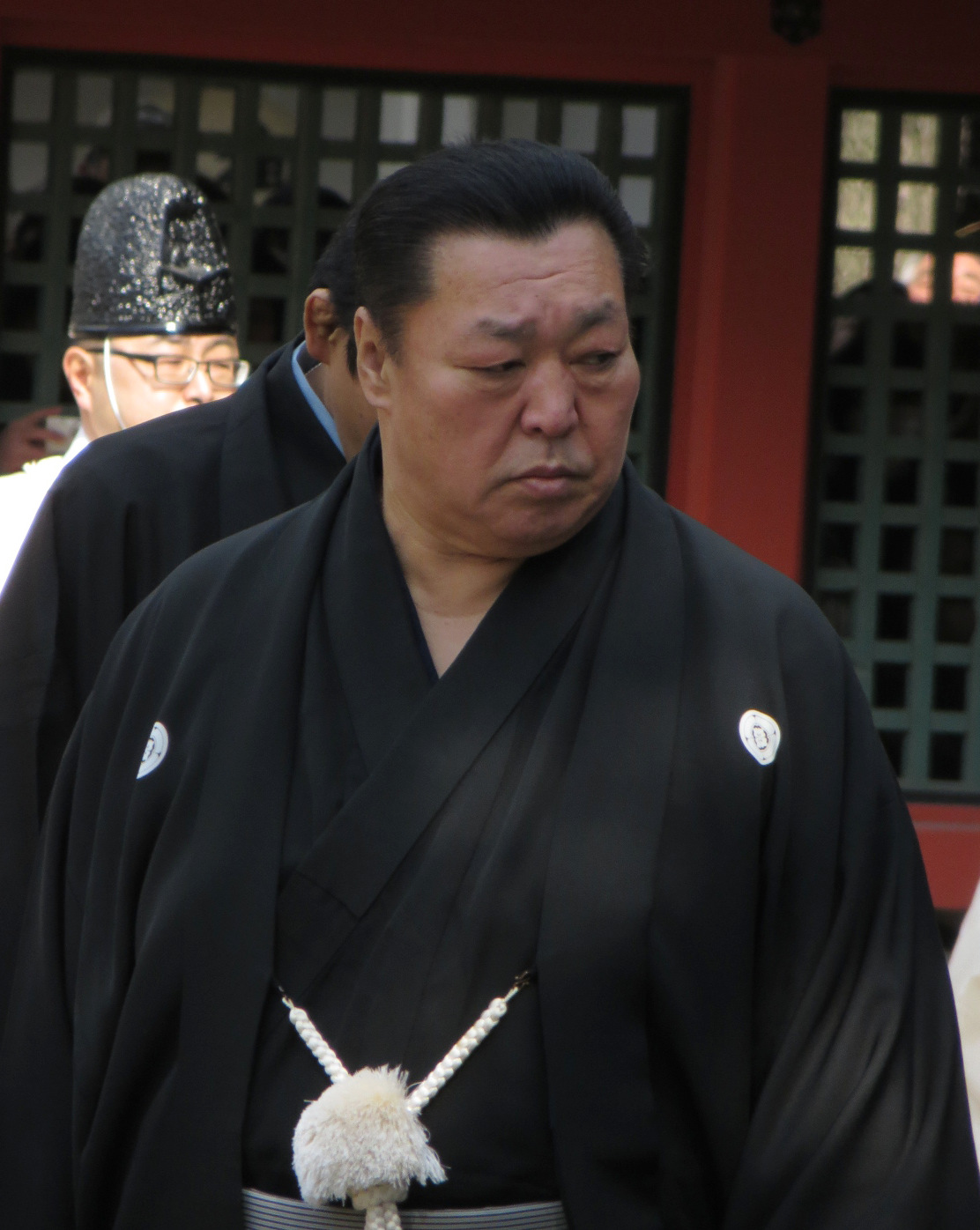
Kitanoumi Toshimitsu wearing a formal black haori with emblems (a kuromontsuki haori); it is tied at the front with two white haori himo.

A haori (羽織) is a traditional Japanese jacket worn over a kimono. Resembling a shortened kimono with no overlapping front panels (okumi), the haori typically features a thinner collar than that of a kimono, and is sewn with the addition of two thin, triangular panels at either side seam. The haori is usually tied at the front with two short cords, known as haori himo, which attach to small loops sewn inside the garment.

During the Edo period, economic growth within the wealthy but low-status merchant classes resulted in an excess of disposable income, much of which was spent on clothing. It was during this period that, due to various edicts on dress mandated by the ruling classes, merchant-class Japanese men began to wear haori with plain external designs and lavishly decorated linings, a trend still seen in men's haori today.

During the early 1800s, geisha in the hanamachi of Fukagawa, Tokyo began to wear haori over their kimono. Haori had until that point only been worn by men; the geisha of Fukagawa, well known for their stylish and unusual fashion choices, set a trend that saw women wearing haori become commonplace by the 1930s. In modern-day Japan, haori are worn by both men and women.

== See also ==
- Hanten, an informal and often padded Japanese jacket
- Happi, a lightweight jacket traditionally worn by shopkeepers or employees as uniform, and commonly worn to festivals in Japan
- Hifu, a sleeveless padded outer vest worn by young children over their kimono to outings and on occasions such as Shichi-Go-San
- Michiyuki, a double-breasted Japanese overcoat characterised by a square neckline and dual fastenings
