= Hanten =

Traditional Japanese short winter coat

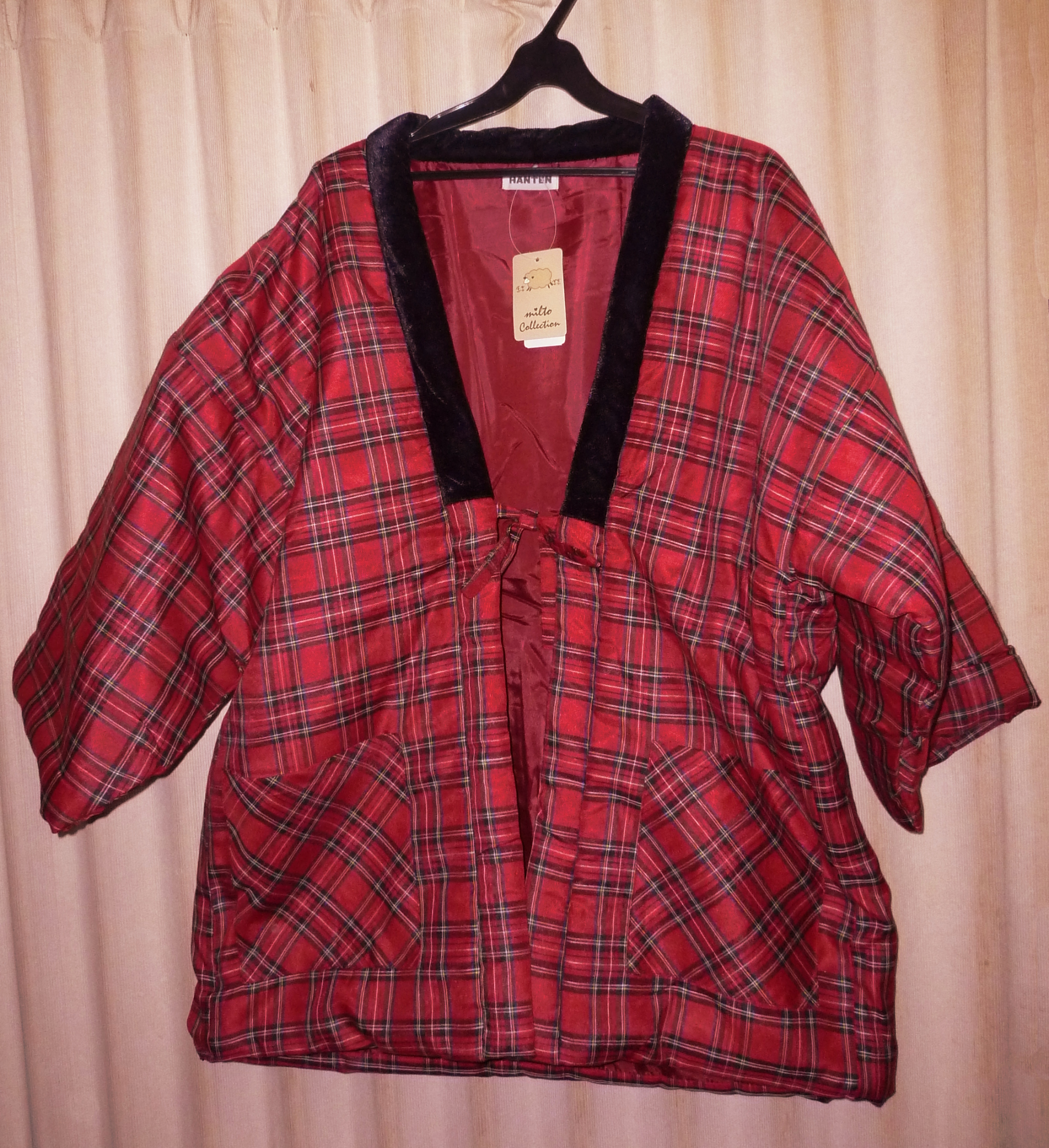
A red hanten on a hanger

A hanten (袢纏) (also 半纏, 半天 or 袢天) is a short winter coat and an item of traditional Japanese clothing. The hanten started to be worn, especially by the common people, in the 18th century, during Japan's Edo period (1603–1867). Its usage waned after the introduction of fleece based clothing.

The shape of the hanten bears a resemblance to a noragi, a traditional patchwork jacket, and the haori, and is worn by both men and women. The facing and lining are padded with thick layers of wadded cotton for warmth. The collar is usually made of black sateen. Hanten often display a family crest or other designs.

== See also ==
- Banbi, a Chinese jacket
- Haori, another type of traditional Japanese jacket
- Kimono
