= Shichi-Go-San =

Annual Japanese festival

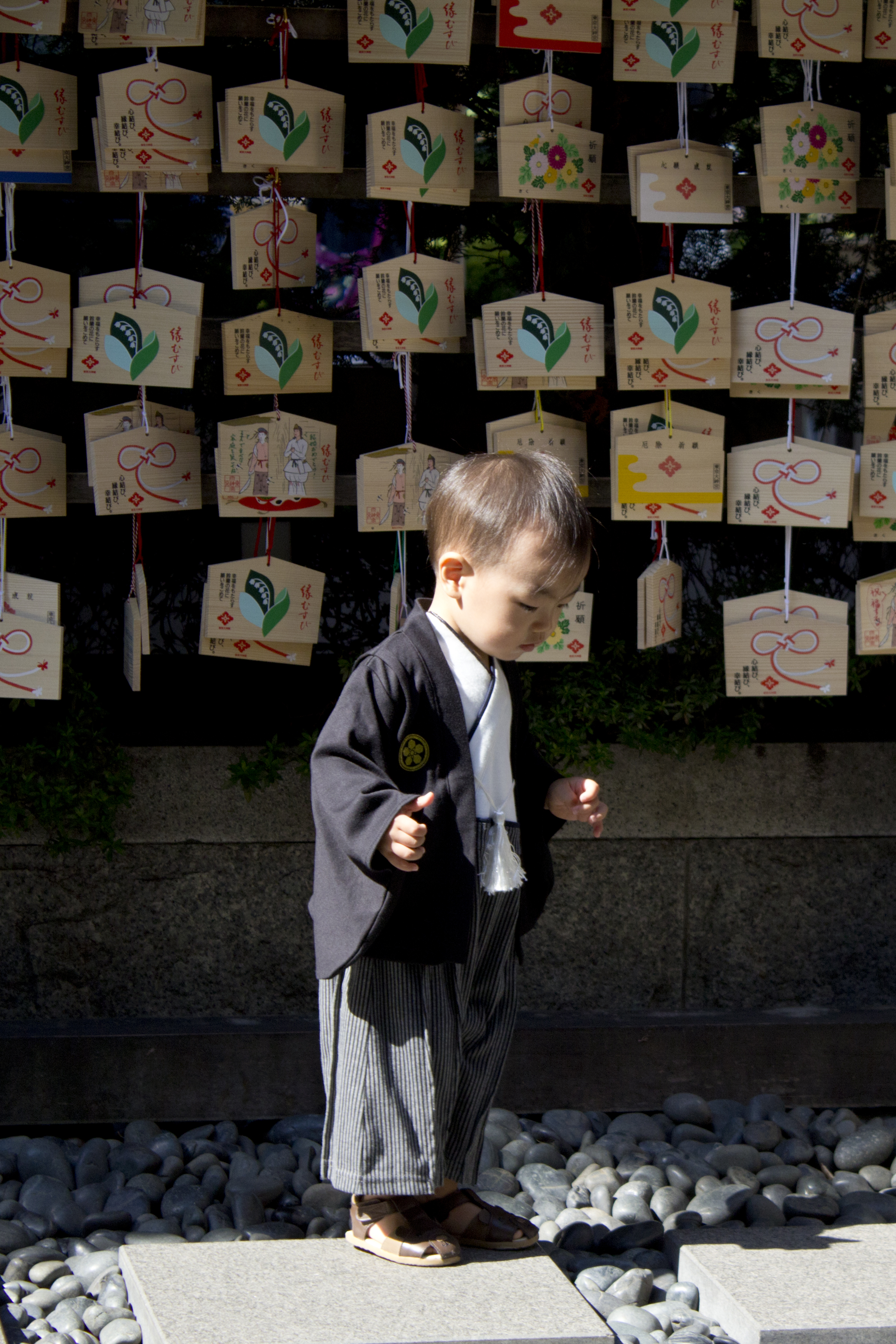
- Japanese boy at a shrine in Tokyo, dressed up for the Shichi-Go-San festival
- Official name: 7-5-3 (shichi go san)
- Observed by: Japan
- Type: Ethnic traditions/non-religious/religious
- Significance: Traditional rite of passage and festival day in Japan for three-year-old and seven-year-old girls, as well as five-year-old and sometimes three-year-old boys.
- Date: November 15

Shichi-Go-San (七五三, lit. 'seven-five-three') is a traditional Japanese rite of passage and festival day for three- and seven-year-old girls, and five-year-old and sometimes three-year-old boys. It is held annually on November 15 and celebrates the growth and well-being of young children. As it is not a national holiday, it is generally observed on the nearest weekend.

== History ==
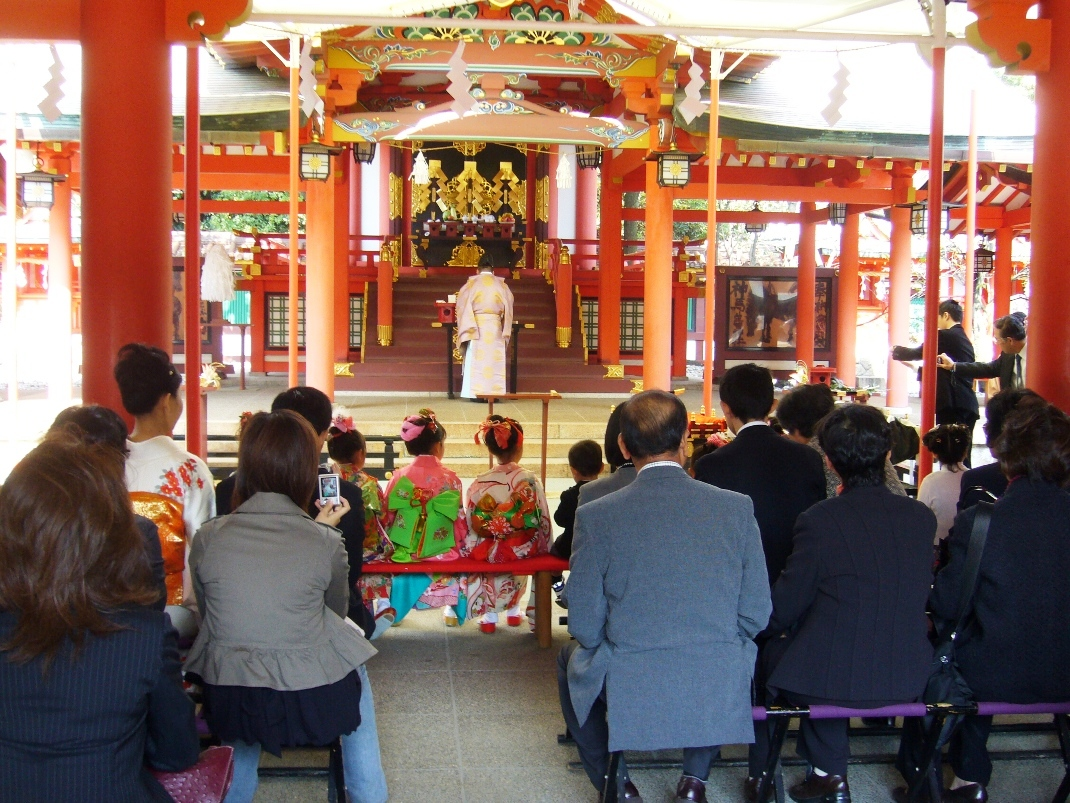
Shichi-Go-San ritual at a Shinto shrine

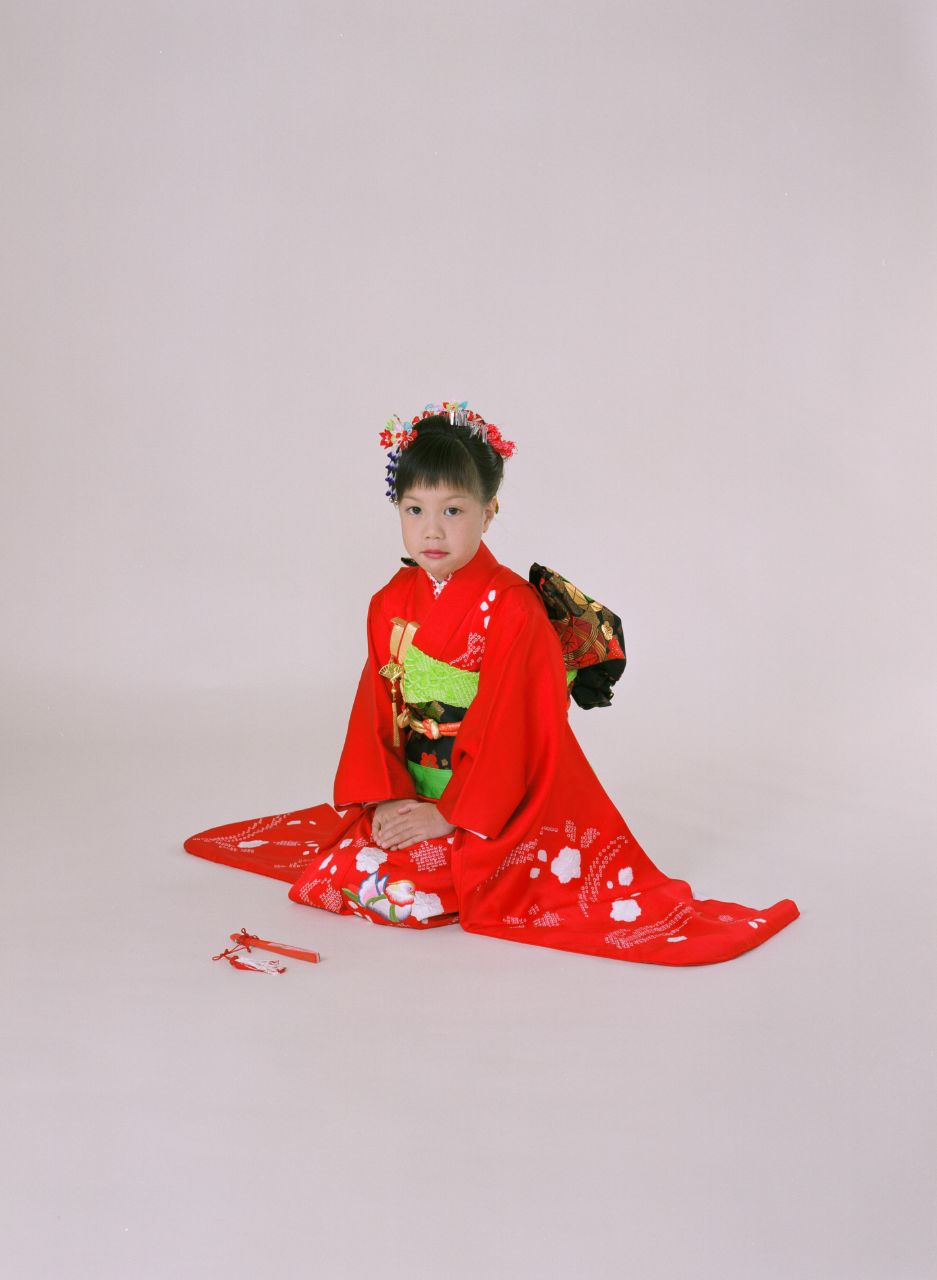
A young girl dressed traditionally for Shichi-Go-San

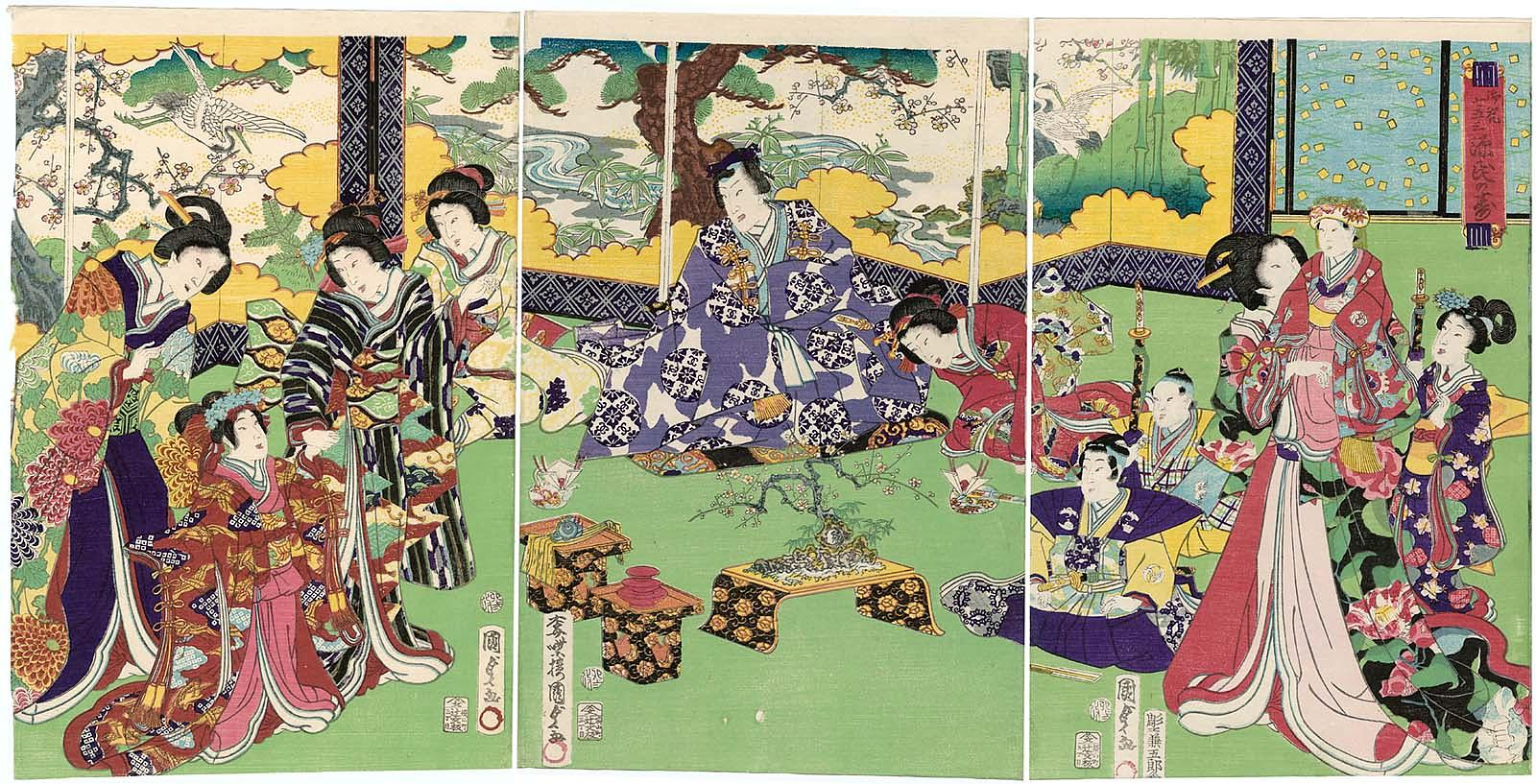
Kunisada

Shichi-Go-San is said to have originated in the Heian period amongst court nobles who would celebrate the passage of their children into middle childhood, though some suggest it began in the Muromachi period because infant mortality was then high, as its meaning is to celebrate the survival of children. The ages 3, 5, and 7 are consistent with East Asian numerology, which holds that odd numbers are lucky. The practice was set to the fifteenth of the month during the Kamakura period.

The celebration is said to have become fixed on November 15 after the fifth Tokugawa shogun, Tsunayoshi, held rites for his son Tokumatsu on that date.

Over time, this tradition passed to the samurai class who added a number of rituals.

The first of these ceremonies, for three-year-olds, is called Kamioki, meaning "hair-leaving"; traditionally, from the period of seven days after birth until the age of three, a child's head would be kept shaved.

The second of these ceremonies, for five-year-old boys, is called Hakamagi-no-Gi. Similar to the Western practice of breeching, this marked the first time a young boy would wear formal attire (a hakama and a haori), associated with roles and responsibilities.

The third ceremony is Obitoki-no-Gi, which is held for seven-year-old girls. This ceremony marked the first time a young girl would wear an obi (a broad, stiff sash for a kimono) instead of simply wearing a kimono tied with attached strings or a lightweight, informal and scarf-like sash. Symbolizing the transition into womanhood, this practice began in the Kamakura period; originally, it was practiced for 9 year-old girls as well as boys, but in the Edo period transitioned into being performed for girls aged 7 only.

By the Meiji period, the practice of Shichi-Go-San was adopted amongst commoners as well, and included the modern ritual of visiting a shrine to drive out evil spirits and wish for a long healthy life.

== Current practice ==
Shichi-Go-San has changed little since the Meiji period. While the ritual regarding hair has been discarded, boys who are aged five and girls who are aged three or seven are still dressed in kimono—many for the first time—for visits to shrines. Three-year-old girls usually wear hifu (a type of padded vest) with their kimono. Western-style formal wear is also worn by some children. A more modern practice is photography, and this day is well known as a day to take pictures of children. It is common to observe the rite based on the traditional way of calculating age, or kazoedoshi, in which children are one year old at birth and gain a year on each New Year's Day. In this case, girls celebrate in the year in which they would reach an age according to the modern calculation of two or six, and boys in the year in which they would reach an age according to the modern calculation of four.

== Chitose ame ==
Chitose ame (千歳飴, lit. 'thousand year candy') is given to children on Shichi-Go-San. Chitose ame is long, thin, red and white candy, which symbolizes healthy growth and longevity. It is given with a bag decorated with a crane and a turtle, which represent long life in Japan. Chitose ame is wrapped in oblaat.

== In popular culture ==
- In Crayon Shin-chan episode 26–3, "My Shichi-Go-San", the Nohara family celebrates Shichi-Go-San.
- In the OVA Mega Man: Upon a Star, Roll makes a promise with Akane at a Japanese festival that she will wear a kimono on Shichi-Go-San.
- In Mama Loves the Poyopoyo-Saurus episode 11–2, "Shobo-san who came in slobbing mama double", the Poyota family celebrates Shichi-Go-San.
- In Paranoia Agent episode 8, "Happy Family Planning", the character Fuyubachi falls asleep on the train holding chitose ame, which he later gives to the young girl Kamome-kun.
- In Katte ni Kaizō episode 3, "To Celebrate This Child's 7th Birthday", it is said that Kaizo is scared of Shichi-Go-San because of a childhood memory.
- In episode 17 of Osomatsu-san, a picture of Jyushimatsu wearing kimono for Shichi-Go-San is shown in the photo album.
- In episode 38 of the anime Dragon Ball Z, Kuririn asks Gohan if he is going to keep wearing that "Shichigosan suit".
- In the second OVA of My Teen Romantic Comedy SNAFU, when Iroha is taking the group photo of the service club members, Hachiman remarks that their pose resembles the kind used for Shichi-Go-San.
- In chapter 19 of the manga Honey and Clover, Hagu has coming-of-age photos taken as she turns 20, but Morita edits the photo to make it look like a Shichi-Go-San photograph, because she looks so young. In the edited photo, Hagu is holding a bag of chitose ame.
- In episode 81 of the anime Toriko, main character Toriko and Komatsu distribute chitose-ame to children at Gourmet shrine on Shichi-Go-San as shoku-otoko.
- In episode 854-1 of the anime Chibi Maruko Chan, Maruko's cousins arrive to celebrate Shichi-Go-San.
