= Flip-flops =

Type of sandal

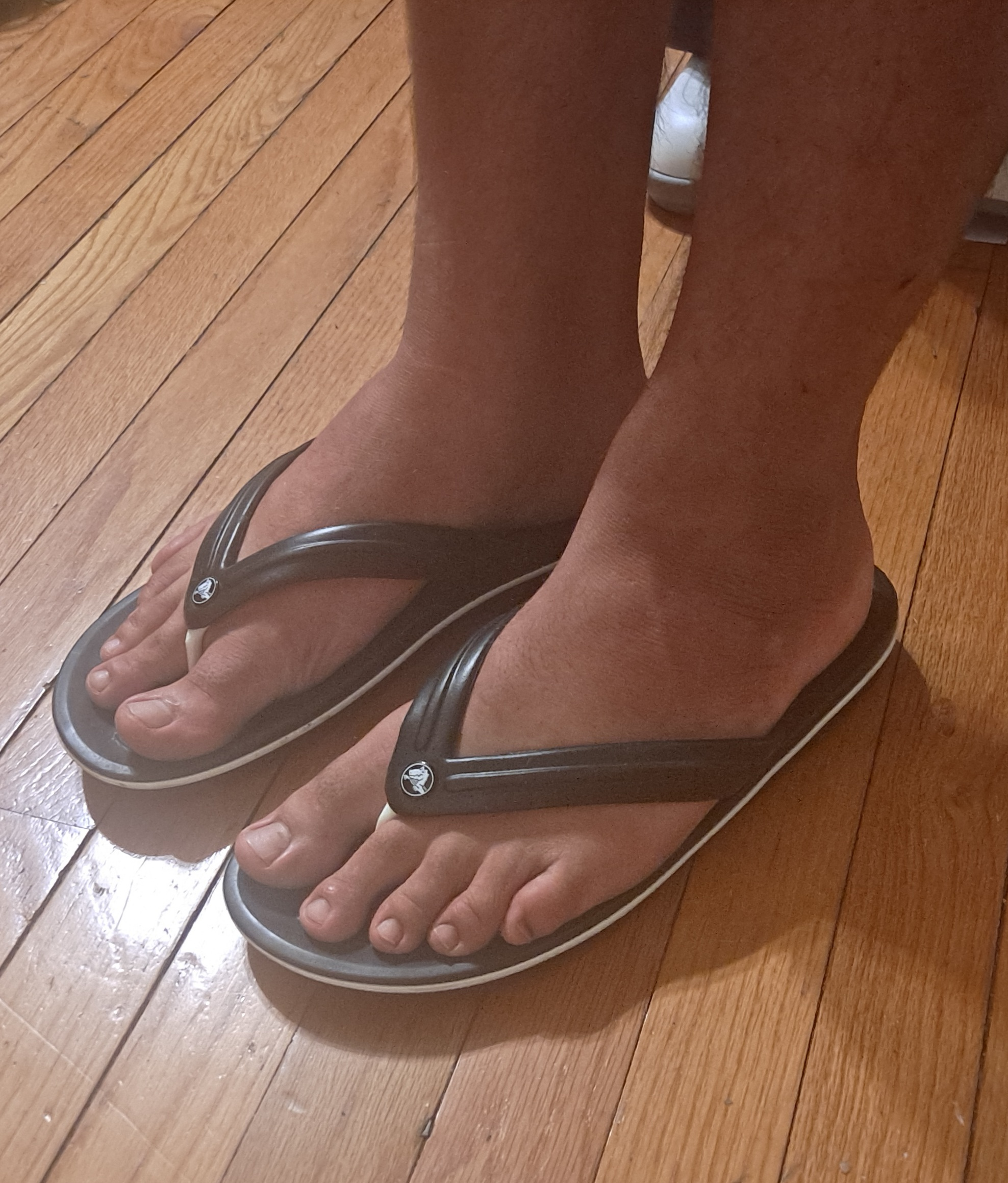
Flip flops on feet being worn

Flip-flops (or thongs in Australian English) are a type of light sandal-like shoe, typically worn as a form of casual footwear. They consist of a flat sole held loosely on the foot by a Y-shaped strap known as a toe thong that passes between the first and second toes and around both sides of the foot. This style of footwear has been worn by people of many cultures throughout the world, originating as early as the ancient Egyptians in 1500 BC. In the United States the modern flip-flop may have had its design taken from the traditional Japanese zōri after World War II, as soldiers brought them back from Japan.

Flip-flops became a prominent unisex summer footwear starting in the 1960s.

== Etymology and other names ==
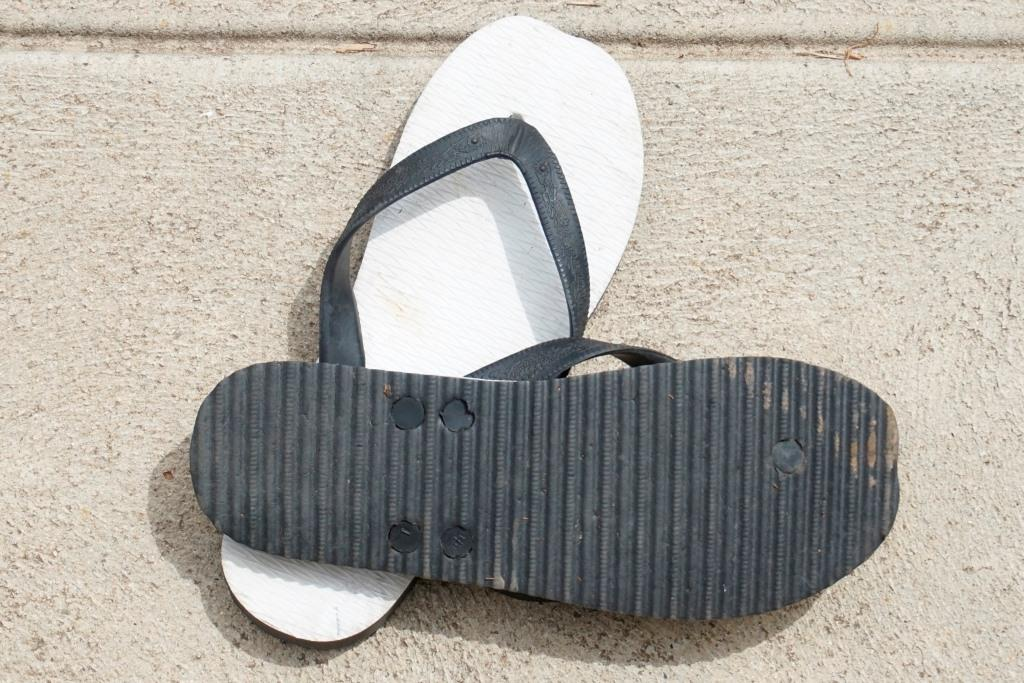
Double-pluggers

The term flip-flop has been used in American and British English since the 1960s to describe inexpensive footwear consisting of a flat base, typically rubber, and a strap with three anchor points: between the big and second toes, then bifurcating to anchor on both sides of the foot. "Flip-flop" may be an onomatopoeia of the sound made by the sandals when walking in them.

Flip-flops are also called thongs (sometimes pluggers, single- or double- depending on construction) in Australia, jandals (originally a trademarked name derived from "Japanese sandals") in New Zealand, and slops or plakkies in South Africa and Zimbabwe.

In the Philippines, they are called tsinelas or slippers.

In India, they are called chappals, (which traditionally referred to leather slippers). This is hypothesized to have come from the Telugu word ceppu (చెప్పు), from Proto-Dravidian *keruppu, meaning "sandal".

In some parts of Latin America, flip-flops are called chanclas. Throughout the world, they are also known by a variety of other names, including slippers in the Bahamas, Hawai‘i, Jamaica and Trinidad and Tobago.

Flip-flops are closely associated with Japan in many Slavic languages. They are called japonke in Slovene and japanke in Croatian, with both terms also referring to a woman of Japanese nationality. The same applies to Polish, Serbian, and other similar instances. In Greek, they are called σαγιονάρες("sayonares"), with a singular flip-flop; called σαγιονάρα ("sayonara"). However, this is not true for all such languages. In Russian, the word for flip-flop contains no reference to Japan; instead, it is vietnamki, which literally means "Vietnamese".

== History ==
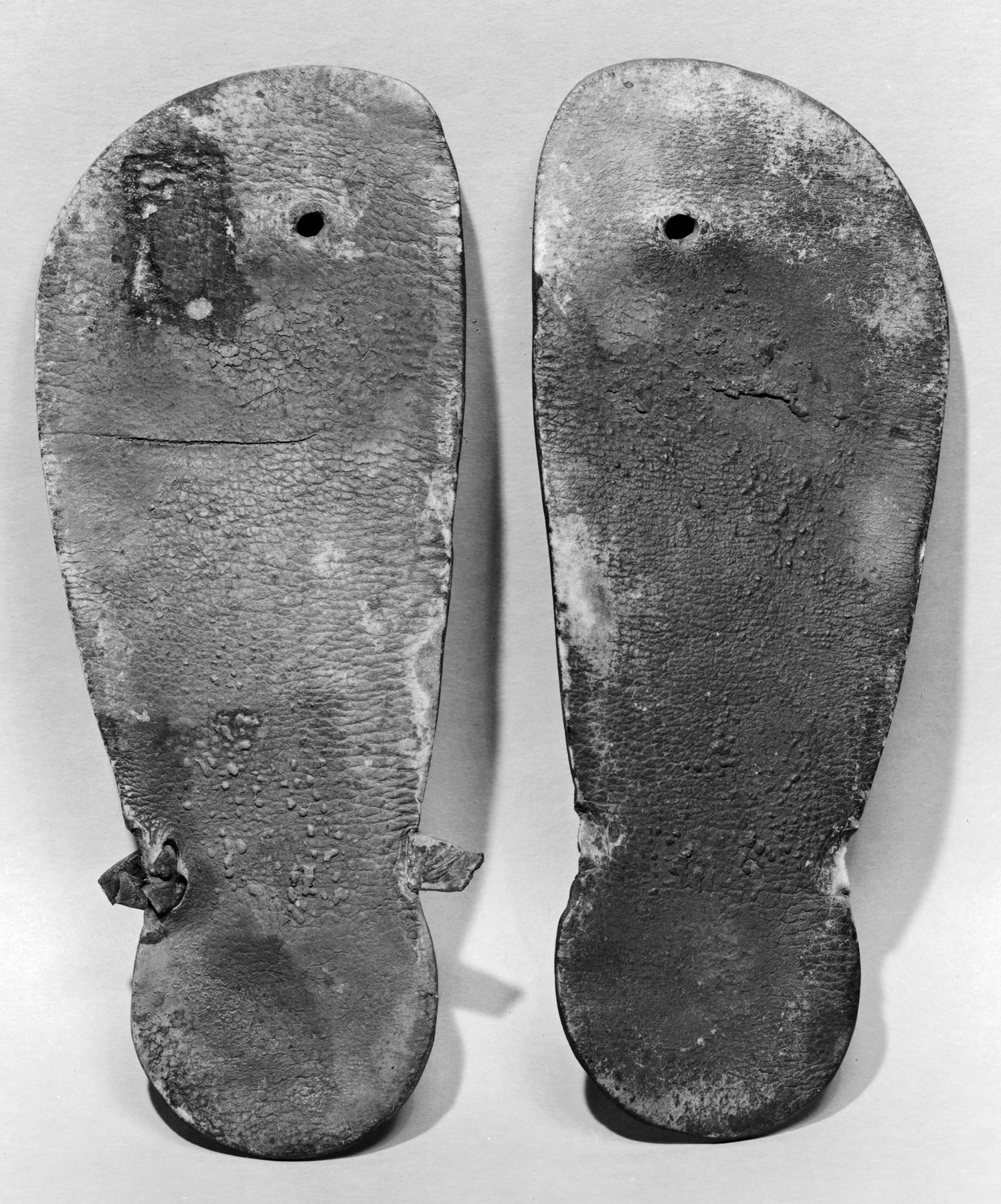
Pair of leather thong ancient sandals from the New Kingdom of Egypt (c. 1550–1307 BC)

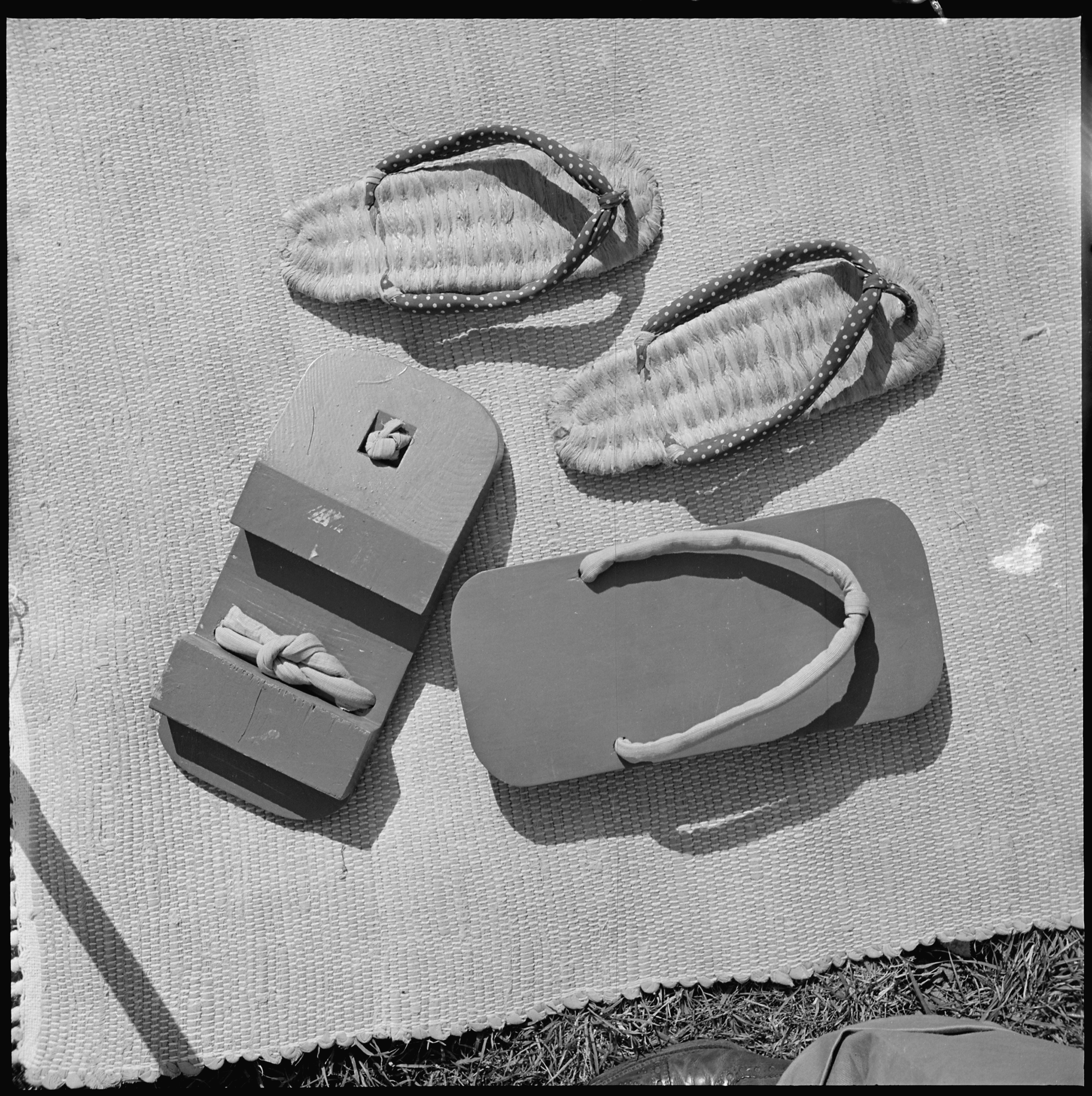
Zori (straw sandals) and Geta (wooden clogs) belonging to interned Japanese in the United States (1946), direct antecedents of modern-day flip-flops.

Thong sandals have been worn for thousands of years, as shown in images of them in ancient Egyptian murals from 4,000 BC. A pair found in Europe was made of papyrus leaves and dated to be approximately 1,500 years old. These early versions of flip-flops were made from a wide variety of materials. Ancient Egyptian sandals were made from papyrus and palm leaves. The Maasai people of Africa made them out of rawhide. In India, they were made from wood. In China and Japan, rice straw was used. The leaves of the sisal plant were used to make twine for sandals in South America, while the natives of Mexico used the yucca plant.

The ancient Greeks and Romans wore versions of flip-flops as well. In Greek sandals, the toe strap was worn between the first and second toes, while Roman sandals had the strap between the second and third toes. These differ from the sandals worn by the Mesopotamians, with the strap between the third and fourth toes. In India, a related "toe knob" sandal was common, with no straps but instead a small knob located between the first and second toes. They are known as Padukas.

The modern flip-flop became popular in the United States as soldiers returning from World War II brought Japanese zōri with them. It caught on in the 1950s during the postwar boom and after the end of hostilities of the Korean War. As they became adopted into American popular culture, the sandals were redesigned and made in the bright colors that dominated 1950s design. They quickly became popular due to their convenience and comfort, and were popular in beach-themed stores and as summer shoes. During the 1960s, flip-flops became firmly associated with the beach lifestyle of California. As such, they were promoted as primarily a casual accessory, typically worn with shorts, bathing suits, or summer dresses. When they became more popular, some people started wearing them for dressier or more formal occasions.

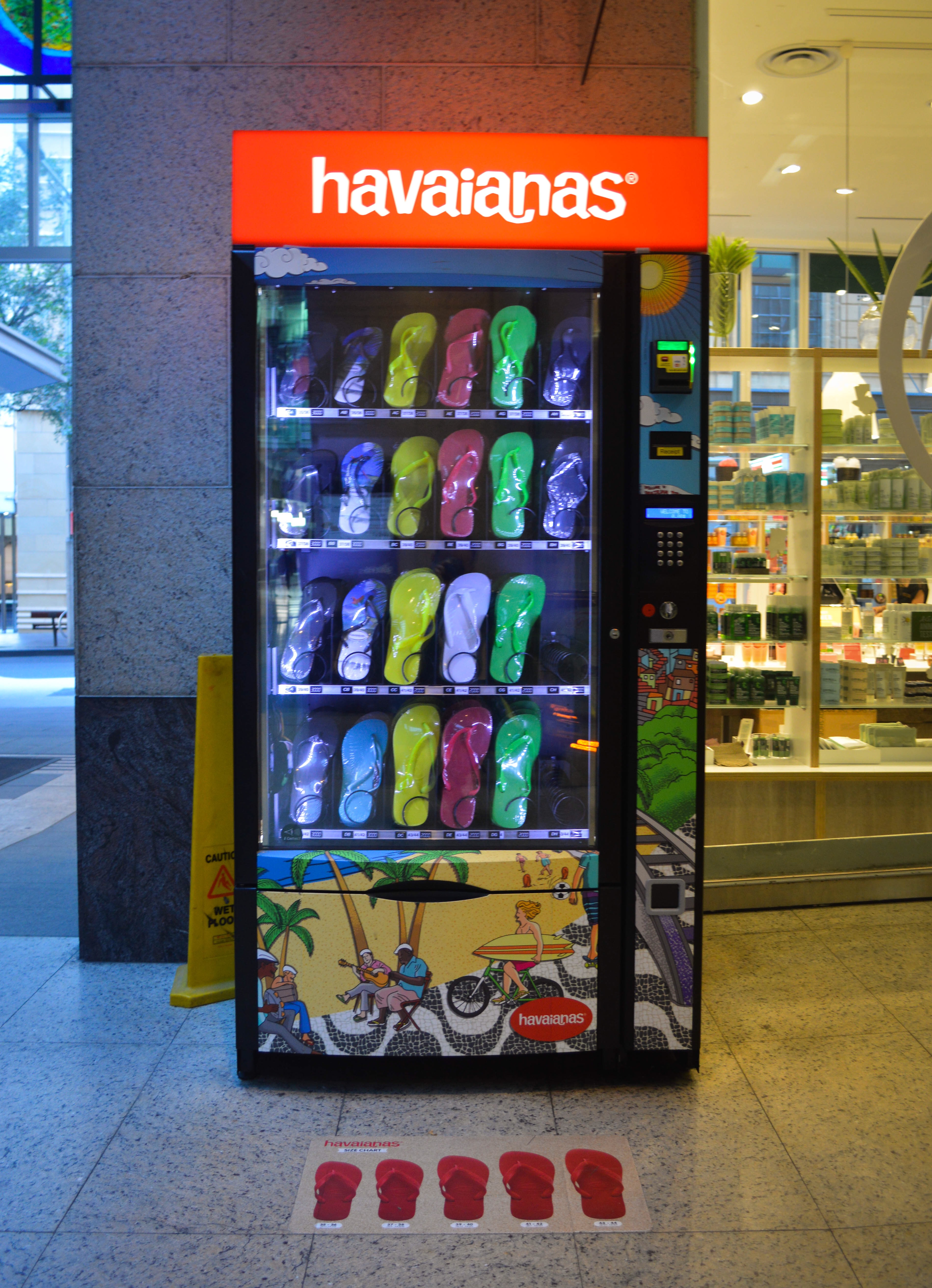
Havaianas thong (flip-flop) vending machine in Sydney, Australia

In 1962, Alpargatas S.A. marketed a version of flip-flops known as Havaianas in Brazil. By 2010, more than 150 million pairs of Havaianas were produced each year. By 2019, production tops 200 million pairs per year. Prices range from under $5 for basics to more than $50 for high-end fashion models.

Flip-flops quickly became popular as casual footwear for young adults. Girls would often decorate their flip-flops with metallic finishes, charms, chains, beads, rhinestones, or other jewelry. Modern flip-flops are available in leather, suede, cloth or synthetic materials such as plastic. Platform and high-heeled variants of the sandals began to appear in the 1990s, and in the late 2010s, kitten heeled "kit-flops".

In the U.S., flip-flops with college colors and logos became common for fans to wear to intercollegiate games. In 2011, while vacationing in his native Hawaii, Barack Obama became the first President of the United States to be photographed wearing a pair of flip-flops. The Dalai Lama of Tibet is also a frequent wearer of flip-flops and has met with several U.S. presidents, including George W. Bush and Barack Obama, while wearing the sandals.

While exact sales figures for flip-flops are difficult to obtain due to the large number of stores and manufacturers involved, the Atlanta-based company Flip Flop Shops claimed that the shoes were responsible for a $20 billion industry in 2009. Furthermore, sales of flip-flops exceeded those of sneakers for the first time in 2006. If these figures are accurate, it is remarkable considering the low cost of most flip-flops.

== Design and custom ==
Parts of a flip-flop sandal

The modern flip-flop has a straightforward design, consisting of a thin sole with two straps running in a Y shape from the sides of the foot to the gap between the big toe and the one beside it. Flip-flops are made from a wide variety of materials, as were the ancient thong sandals. The modern sandals are made of more modern materials, such as rubber, foam, plastic (and such as PVC, EVA and TPE), leather, suede, and even fabric. Flip-flops made of polyurethane have caused some environmental concerns; because polyurethane is a number 7 resin, they can't be easily discarded, and they persist in landfills for a very long time. In response to these concerns, some companies have begun selling flip-flops made from recycled rubber, such as that from used bicycle tires, or even hemp, and some offer a recycling program for used flip flops.

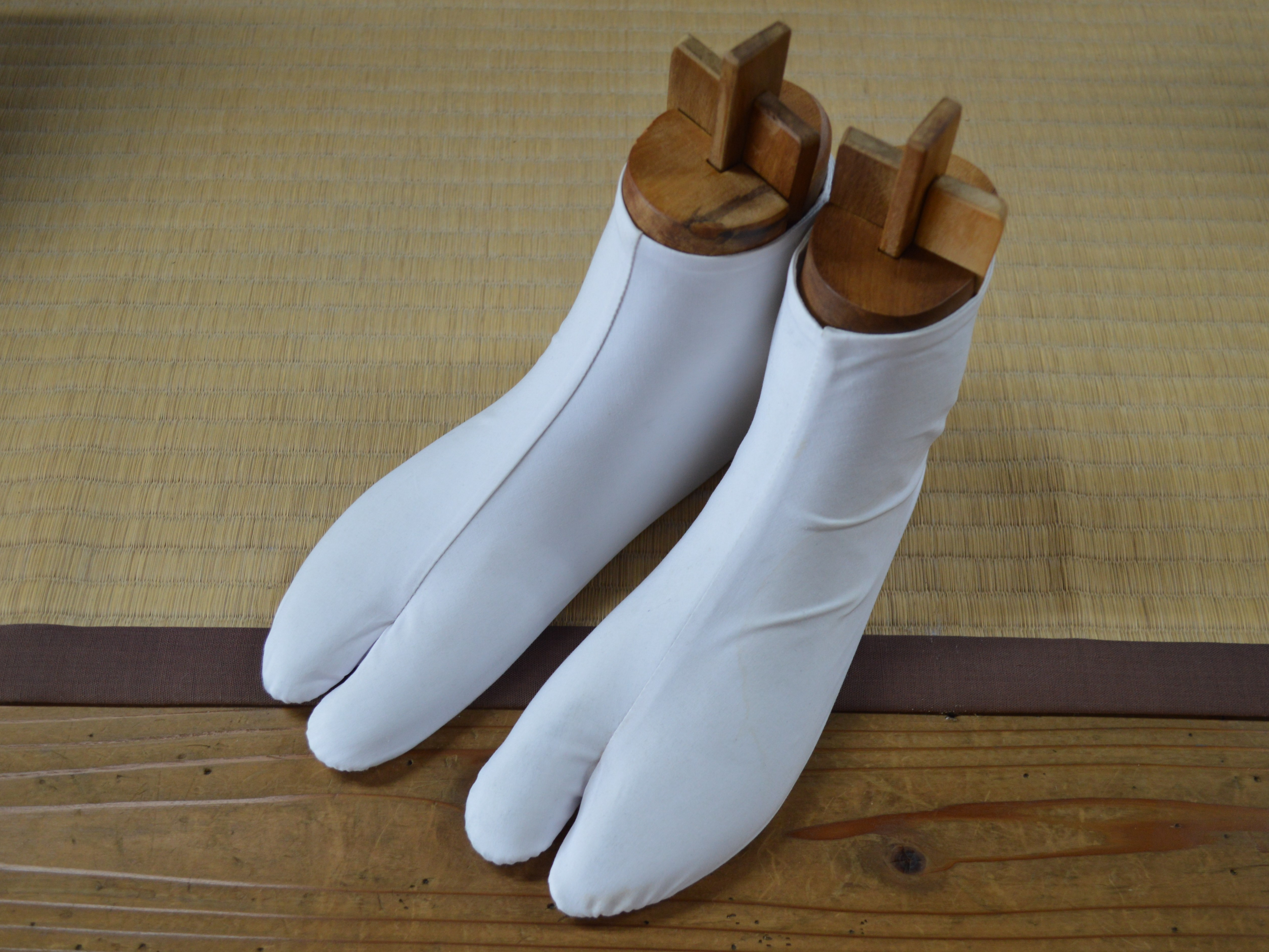
Japanese tabi socks, traditionally white or black, to be worn with zōri sandals

Because of the strap between the toes, flip-flops are typically not worn with socks. In colder weather, however, some people wear flip-flops with toe socks or merely pull standard socks forward and bunch them up between the toes. The Japanese commonly wear tabi, a type of sock with a single slot for the thong, with their zōri.

== Health issues ==
Flip-flops provide the wearer with some mild protection from hazards on the ground, such as sharp rocks, splintery wooden surfaces, hot sand at the beach, broken glass, or even fungi and wart-causing viruses in locker rooms or community pool surfaces. However, walking for long periods in flip-flops can result in pain in the feet, ankles and lower legs or tendonitis.

The flip-flop straps may cause frictional issues, such as rubbing during walking, resulting in blisters, and the open-toed design may result in stubbed or even broken toes.

Individuals with flat feet or other foot issues are advised to wear a shoe or sandal with better support.

The American Podiatric Medical Association strongly recommends that people not play sports in flip-flops, or do any type of yard work with or without power tools, including cutting the grass, when they wear these shoes. There are reports of people who ran or jumped in flip-flops and suffered sprained ankles, fractures, and severe ligament injuries that required surgery.

Compared to ordinary slippers, flip-flops may be unhealthy for foot arches.

Because they provide almost no protection from the sun, on a part of the body more heavily exposed and where sunscreen can more easily be washed off, sunburn can be a risk for flip-flop wearers.

== In popular culture ==
For many Latin Americans, la chancla (in Spanish) or o chinelo (in Portuguese) (= the flip-flop), held or thrown, is known to be used as a tool of corporal punishment by mothers, similar to the use of slippers for the same purpose in Europe. Poor conduct in public may elicit being struck on the head with a flip-flop. The flip-flop may also be thrown at a misbehaving child. For many children, even the threat of the mother reaching down to take off a flip-flop and hold it in her raised hand is considered enough to correct their behaviour. The notoriety of the practice has become an Internet meme among Latin Americans and Hispanic and Latino immigrants to the United States. In recent years, the practice has been increasingly condemned as physically abusive. One essay, "The Meaning of Chancla: Flip Flops and Discipline", seeks to end "chancla culture" in disciplining children. The term "avaiana de pau" (English: wooden flip-flop, named like wooden spoon), has become a popular meme in Brazilian internet culture, often used to depict exaggerated or humorous scenarios of the mother scolding her son. This term gained notoriety through videos and memes created by the Piologo brothers in 2004, who used it for comedic effect.

In India, a chappal is traditionally a leather slipper, but the term has also come to include flip-flops. A mother's corporal punishment was often with a chappal, striking the child on the buttocks, hands or about the head and shoulders. Throwing a chappal became a video trope, "flying chappal", and "Flying chappal received" an expression by an adult acknowledging that they had been verbally chastised by their parents or other adults.

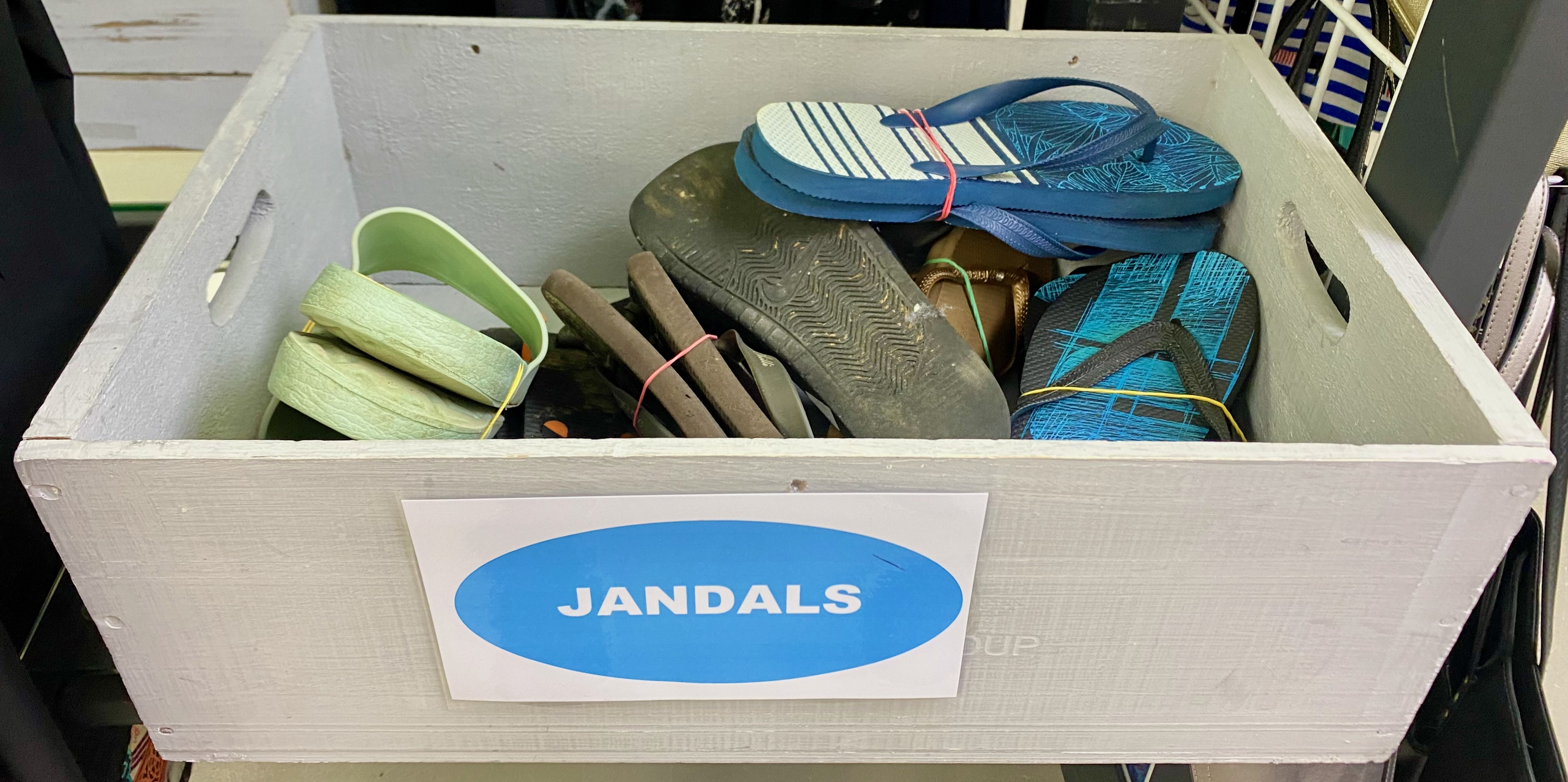
Jandals for sale at a New Zealand Op Shop

Flip-flops are "tsinelas" in the Philippines, derived from the Spanish "chinela" (for slipper), and are used to discipline children, but with no mention of throwing. Children play Tumbang preso, which involves trying to knock over a can with thrown flip-flops.

When the Los Angeles–based Angel City FC and San Diego Wave FC joined the National Women's Soccer League in 2022, a leader in an Angel City supporters' group called the new regional rivalry La Chanclásico as a nod to the region's Hispanic heritage. The rivalry name combines chancla with clásico ("classic"), used in Spanish to describe many sports rivalries. The Chanclásico name quickly caught on with both fanbases, and before the first game between the teams, the aforementioned Angel City supporter created a rivalry trophy consisting of a flip-flop mounted on a trophy base and covered with gold spray paint. The rivalry name was effectively codified via a tweet from Wave and US national team star Alex Morgan.

As part of Q150 celebrations in 2009 celebrating the first 150 years of Queensland, Australia, the Queensland Government published a list of 150 cultural icons of Queensland, representing the people, places, events, and things that were significant to Queensland's first 150 years. Thongs (as they are known in Australia) were among as the Q150 Icons.

Flip-flops (known in New Zealand as jandals) are considered Kiwiana.

== See also ==
- List of shoe styles
- Hnyat-phanat (Burmese)
- Sandal
- Slide (footwear)
- Slipper
- Slippering (corporal punishment)
- Toe socks
