= Boot sock =

Style of sock

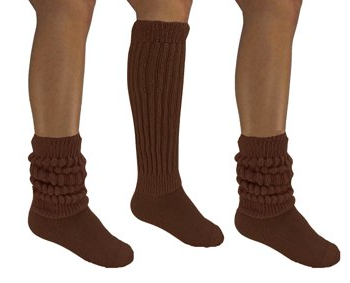
Boot socks

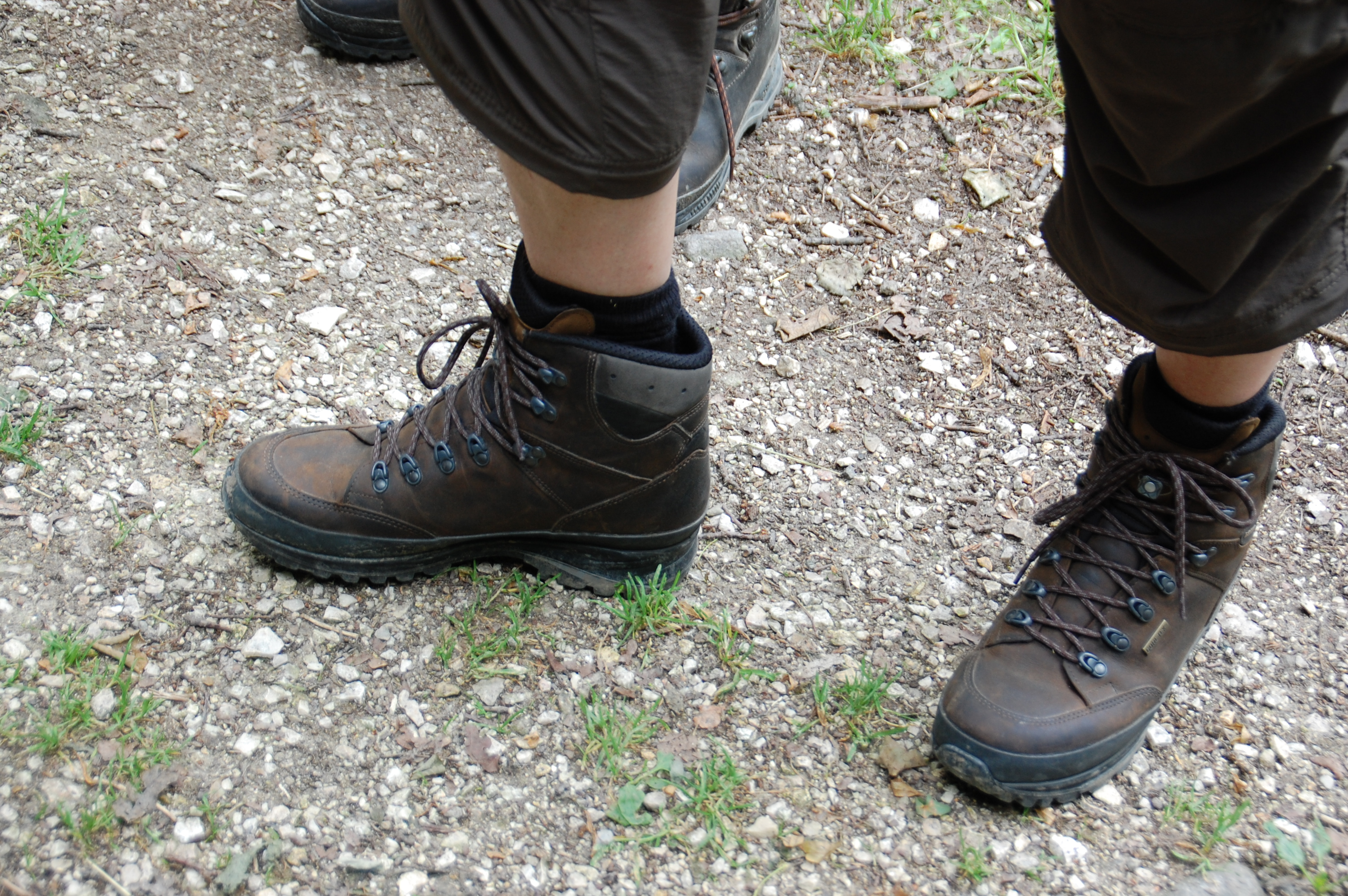
Hiking boots with socks

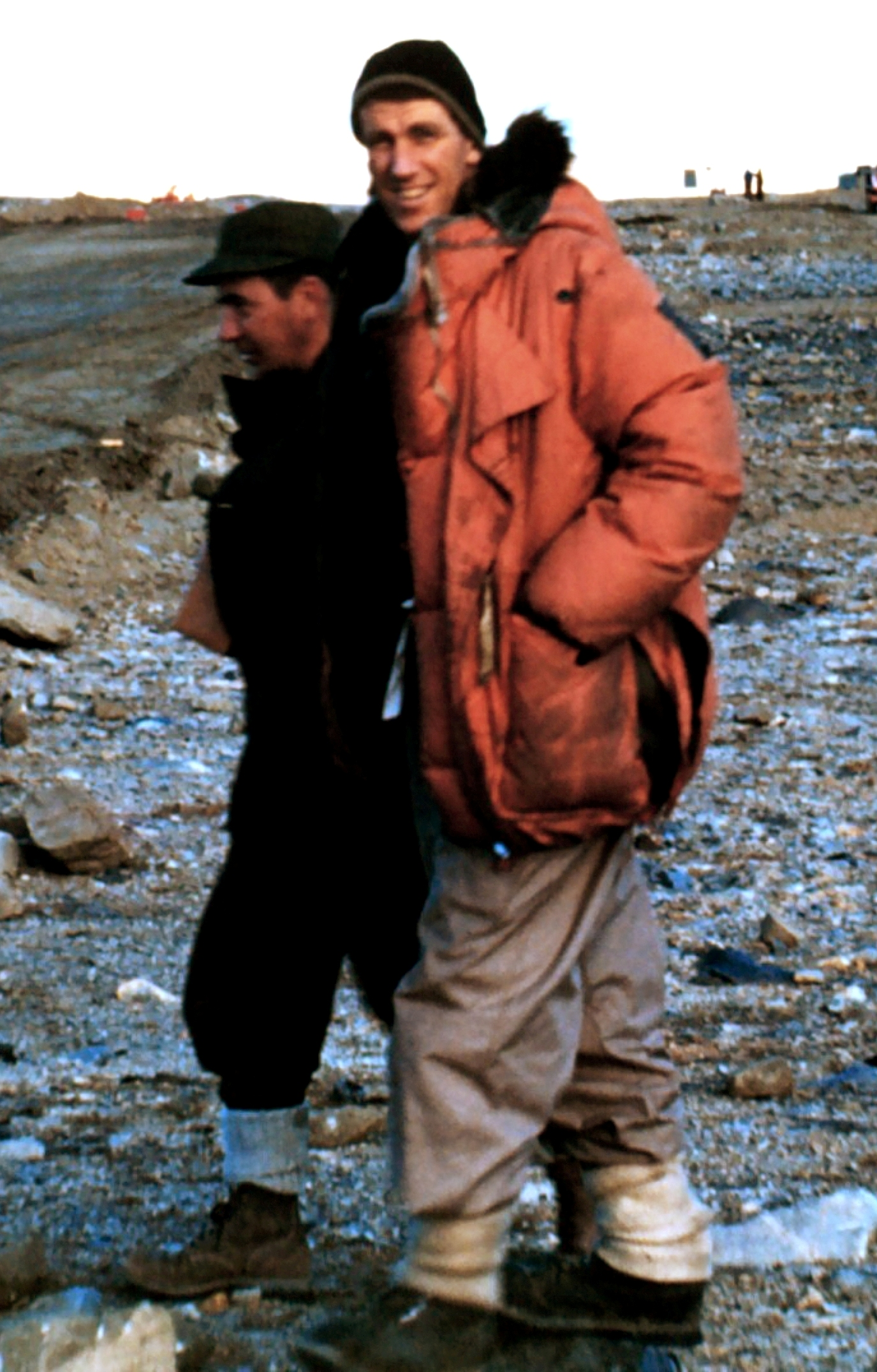
Edmund Hillary in 1957 after accompanying the first plane to land at the Marble Point ground air strip, Antarctica

Boot socks are a type of sock suitable for wearing with boots. Typically made from a knitted material, popular styles of yarn currently used to manufacture them are the cable and Fair Isle knits. Boot socks provide additional comfort and warmth in colder weather. Boots are often worn by both genders, with military boots, brogue boots and hiking boots all being popular styles to pair with boot socks. Boot socks vary in lengths, ranging from normal-sized socks to knee high length socks.

== Material ==
A variety of materials have been studied to determine how material affects prevalence of foot blisters.

== Uses ==
Boot socks can be worn for comfort or for fashion. Rolling up the cuff on pants to show a glimpse of the boot sock is a trend which has been highlighted by various fashion sources. Rolling the boot socks down in a scruffy way adds a unique touch to a look. Another way to style them includes wearing the socks with knee high boots and knee high riding boots with knee length or over the knee length boot socks. They can be worn alone or over tights, leggings, or jeans, scrunched down or pulled up at the top of the boots. This style of wearing boot socks is fashionable with young girls, tweens, teens, college age girls and women.

Boots are seen as hard wearing footwear and aren't as comfortable to wear as most shoes, so wearing a decent sock is crucial. Wearing boot socks has become popular with the Wellington Boot and hiking boots, as well as for any other sporting activity involving walking long distances.

== See also ==
- Sock puppet
- Socks and sandals
