= Anklet (disambiguation) =

Anklet is an ornament worn around the ankle.

Anklet may also refer to:

- Anklet (sock)
- Operation Anklet
- Short gaiters
