= Socks and sandals =

Fashion combination

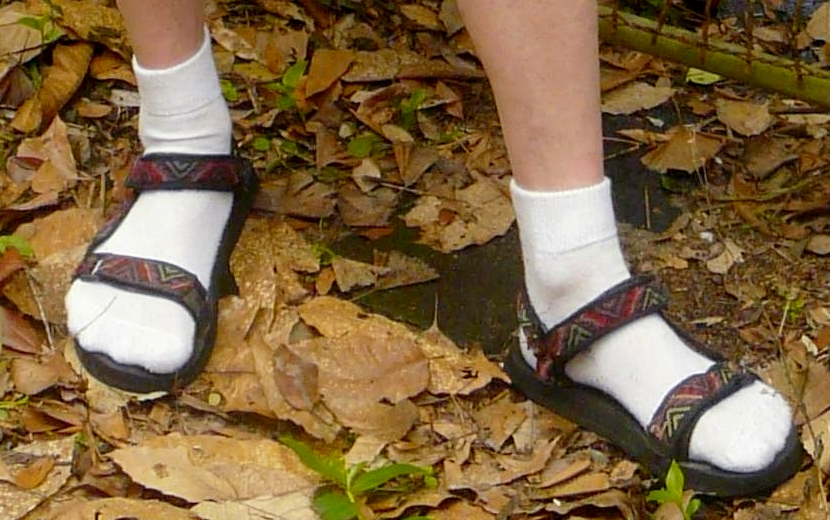
Sandals worn with white ankle socks

Wearing socks and sandals together is a controversial fashion combination and social phenomenon that is discussed in various countries and cultures. In some places it is considered a fashion faux pas.

== History ==
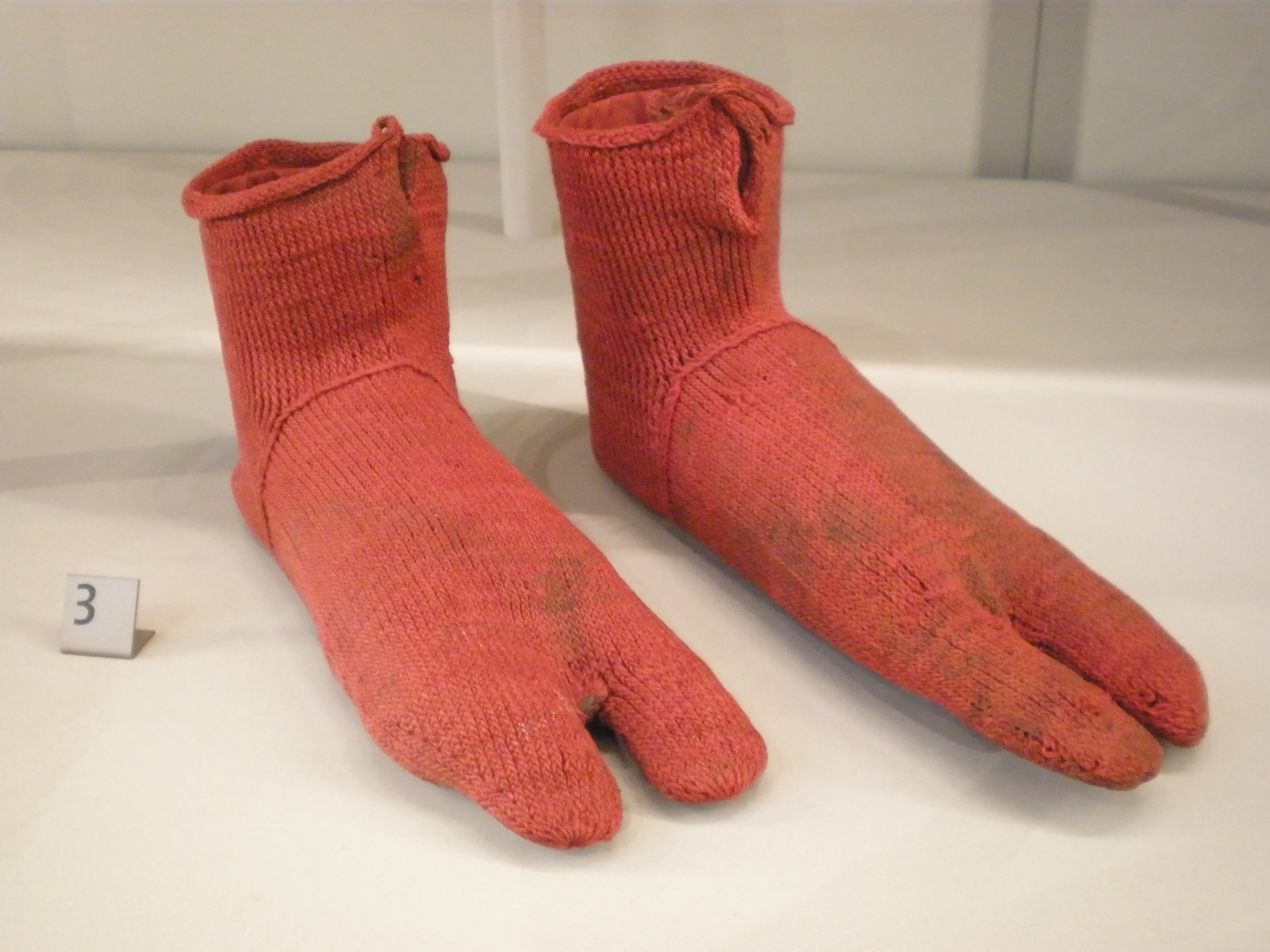
The earliest known surviving pair of socks, created by naalbinding. The split toes were designed for use with sandals. Dating from 300 to 500 CE, they were excavated from Oxyrhynchus on the Nile in Egypt.

The earliest evidence of wearing socks and sandals is documented at the archaeological site between Dishforth and Leeming in North Yorkshire, England. The discovery suggests that ancient Romans wore socks with sandals at least 2,000 years ago.

Tabi are a type of traditional Japanese socks designed to be worn together with sandals that have been used since at least the 15th century.

== Reception ==
Saurabh Bhatia, the author of the book Indian Corporate Etiquette, advises readers: "If, for some reason, you are not wearing socks with sandals, ensure your toes are clean and your toe-nails are closely clipped". Joshua Belter, the author of The Book of Rules: The Right Way to Do Everything, points out that wearing socks with sandals reduces the amount of cooling feet experience. However, energy design handbooks include light socks and sandals as part of a high-thermal flux tropical attire.

=== Regional phenomenon ===
According to Brian Shea of The Evening Sun, wearing socks and sandals is popular among the older generation and Germans.

A survey found that the majority of British people would not wear socks and sandals.

Wearing socks and sandals is considered rather unaesthetic in the Czech Republic; however, some people prefer socks and sandals, and a part of the population prefers both the options (sandals with and without socks).

In Israel, socks and sandals are stereotypically associated with immigrants from the former Soviet Union.

Socks and sandals is a regular Pacific Northwest phenomenon. Seattle based insurance company PEMCO used the "Sandals & Socks Guy" character as part of a 2007 advertising campaign that portrayed this as a typically Pacific Northwest fashion. The Daily Dot highlighted "sandals and socks" as a term entered into a web search engine more often by Washingtonians than residents of any other state.

=== Cultural phenomenon ===
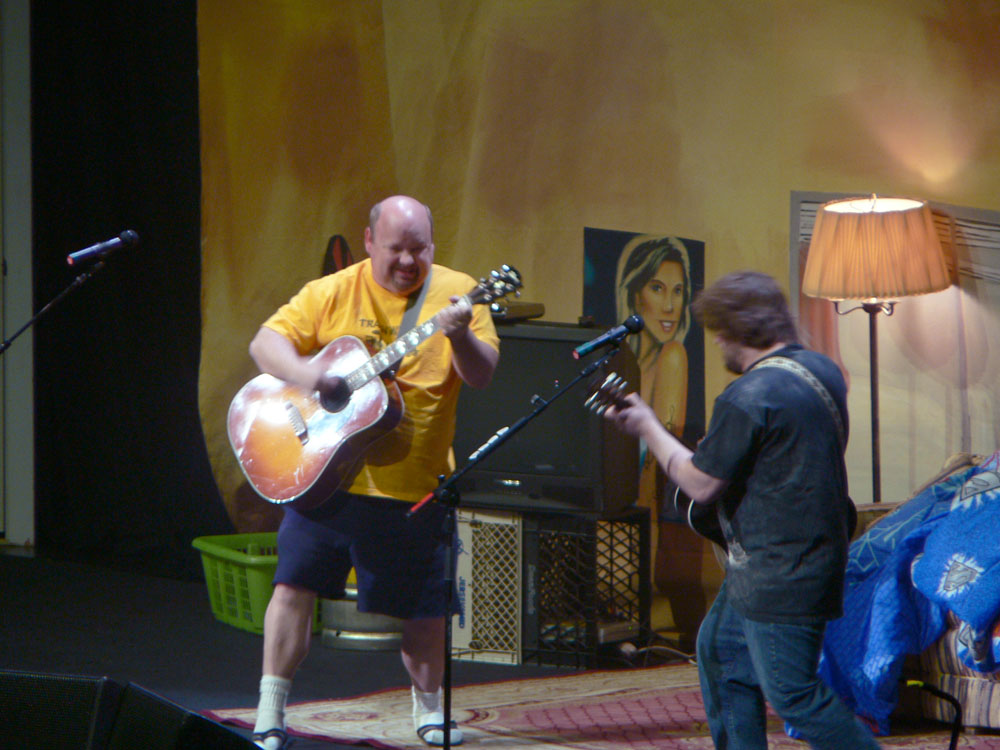
Kyle Gass performing with Tenacious D while wearing socks and sandals

Wearing socks and sandals is associated by some with geek culture. Socks and sandals were noted as a "high crime of fashion" when introduced as Xbox Live avatar accessory downloadable content in 2009.

The combination is also common to some groups of conservative Mennonites as satirized in a 2017 article on The Unger Review and depicted in the 2018 Miriam Toews novel and subsequent Sarah Polley film Women Talking.

=== 2010s fashion trend ===
In 2010, the newspaper Daily Telegraph reported that wearing socks and sandals was a hit for spring/summer of that year. Starting in 2010, and again in 2014, several sources reported that socks and sandals had become a fashion trend in the United States and the United Kingdom, appearing in several runway shows, including those of Miu Miu (2010) and fashion designers Vivienne Tam and Mary-Kate and Ashley Olsen (2014), and picked up by celebrities.

== See also ==
- Dress socks
- Toe socks
