= Anklets (sock) =

Style of low-cut sock

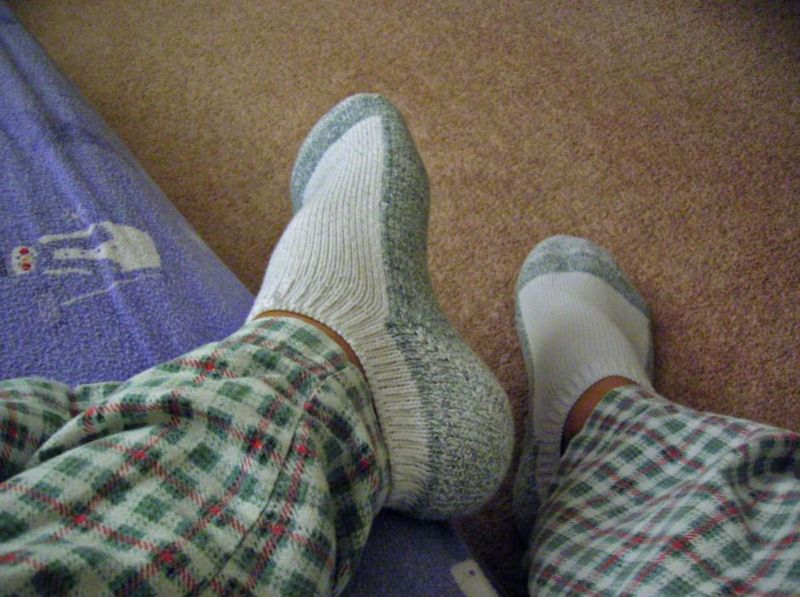
A pair of anklets being worn with pajamas.

Anklets (pronounced /ˈæŋklət/) are a type of sock. They are not long, typically reaching just below or above the ankle. Anklets are sometimes folded or cuffed over. Ankle socks are usually worn with low-heeled shoes such as sneakers and are popular among both men and women.

== See also ==
- Anklet
- Dress socks
- Toe socks
