= Tabi =

Traditional Japanese sock with split-toed construction

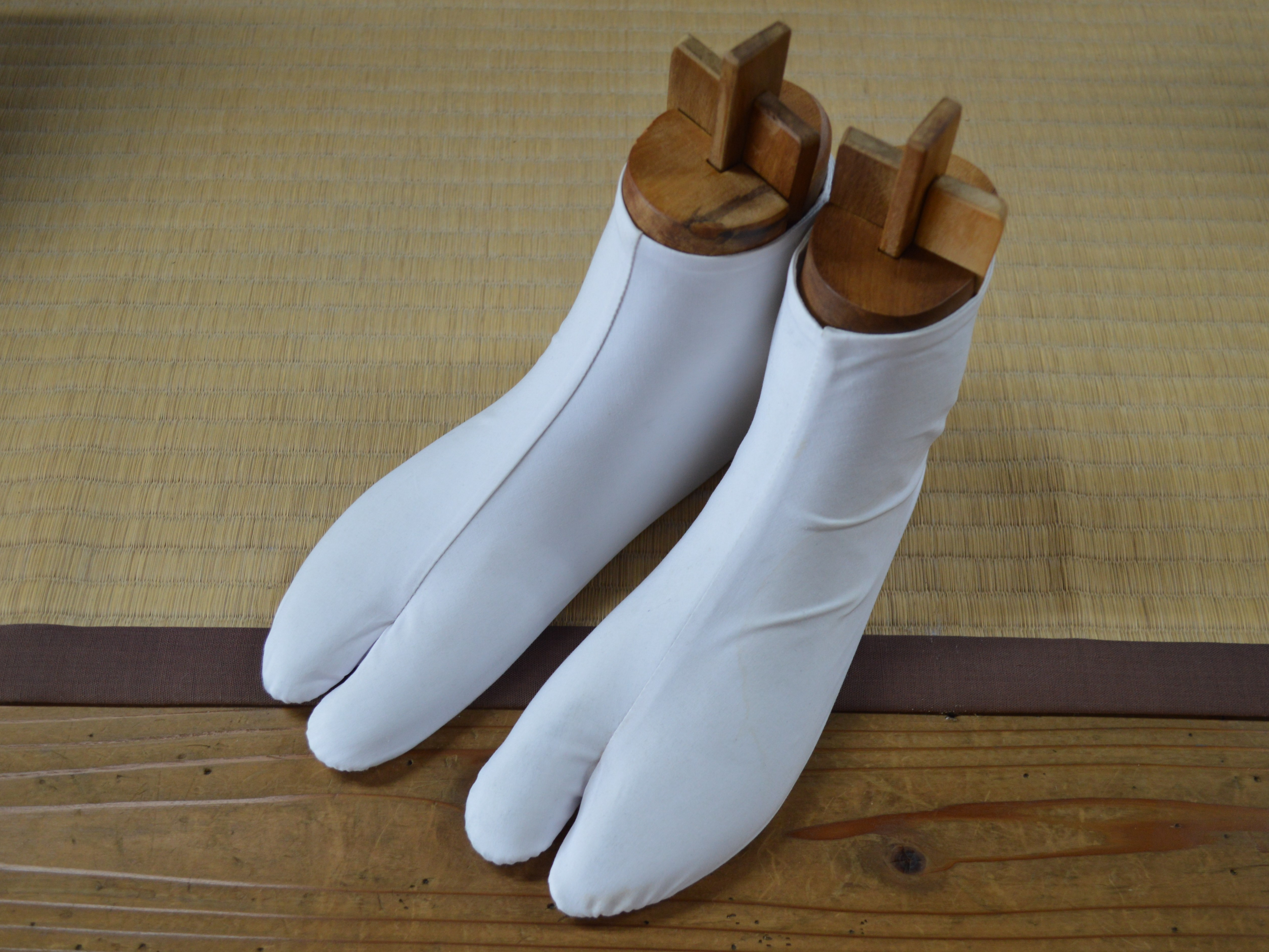
Pair of tabi

Tabi (足袋) are traditional Japanese socks worn with thonged footwear such as zori, dating back to the 15th century.

== History ==
Japanese tabi are usually understood today to be a kind of split-toed sock that is not meant to be worn alone outdoors, much like regular socks. However, tabi were originally a kind of leather shoe made from an animal hide, as evidenced by historical usage and the earlier form of the word, tanbi, written 単皮, with the kanji literally signifying "single hide". As Japanese footwear evolved, tabi also changed, with the split-toe design emerging towards the late Heian period (794–1185 AD) to allow the wearer to accommodate the thong of sandals. Outdoor versions of tabi involved some kind of reinforcement, with soles traditionally made of cloth, leather, or straw.

Brothers Tokujirō Ishibashi and Shōjirō Ishibashi, founders of the tyre company Bridgestone, are credited with the invention of rubber-soled jika-tabi in 1922; these are now the dominant form of outdoor tabi, and the term tabi generally refers to the indoor form.

== Use ==
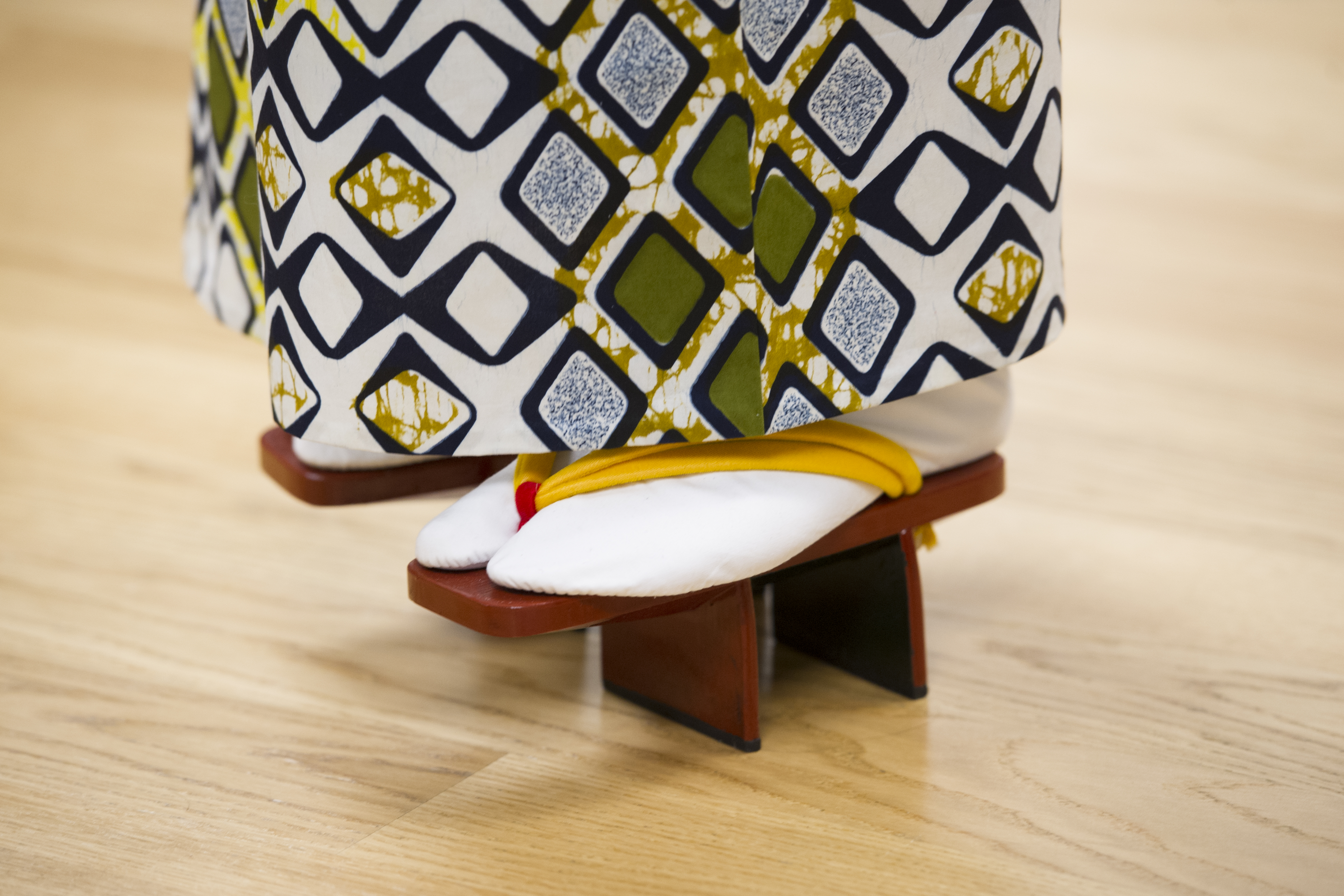
Tabi being worn with geta

Tabi are worn by both men and women with traditional formal footwear such as zori, and sometimes the less-formal geta. Tabi are typically worn with clothing such as kimono. Tabi are sewn with a divided toe, in order to be worn with thonged footwear.

Historically, most people in Japan wore tabi, as most Japanese footwear was thonged; however, some, such as upper-class courtesans and the geisha of Fukagawa, did not wear them, as the bare foot was considered to be erotic in Japanese culture. Others, such as lower-working class members of society who could not afford tabi, either did not wear them or wore boots such as jika-tabi instead.

In traditional Japanese spaces and buildings, such as Noh theatres, teahouses and for traditional stage performances, tabi must be worn, and shoes are not worn inside or on stage.

== Styles ==
The most common color of tabi is white, which represents purity. White tabi are worn in formal situations such as tea ceremonies. Men sometimes will wear blue or black tabi for traveling. Colored tabi are also available, and are sometimes used in kabuki theatre as part of a character's costume, or are worn with more casual outfits as fashion.

Traditionally, tabi are sewn from cloth cut to form. They are open at the back to be slipped on and have fasteners along the opening (known as kohaze) so they can be closed. Tabi sewn from stretch material without fasteners are also available.

== Jika-tabi ==
One distinctive style of tabi are jika-tabi (地下足袋, lit. 'tabi that contact the ground'). Made of heavier, tougher material and often having rubber soles, jika-tabi resemble boots and are outer footwear rather than socks. Like other tabi, jika-tabi also have divided toes.

== Modern versions ==
Contemporary tabi socks—socks with a separation between the big toe and the rest of the toes—are also available. This reflects the number of people who still prefer to wear zori and geta, especially during Japan's hot, humid summers.

Modern tabi occasionally have elastic openings instead of fasteners.

Belgian fashion house Maison Margiela has released modern boots with a separated big toe since the late 1980s-early 1990s. They can cost more than $1000 per pair. In 2023, the story of a man stealing a pair of tabi shoes from his Tinder date was amplified by TikTok and other social media sites.

A related item are toe socks, which have five separate compartments; these are known as gohon-yubi no kutsushita (５本指の靴下, five-toe socks) in Japanese.

== Gallery ==
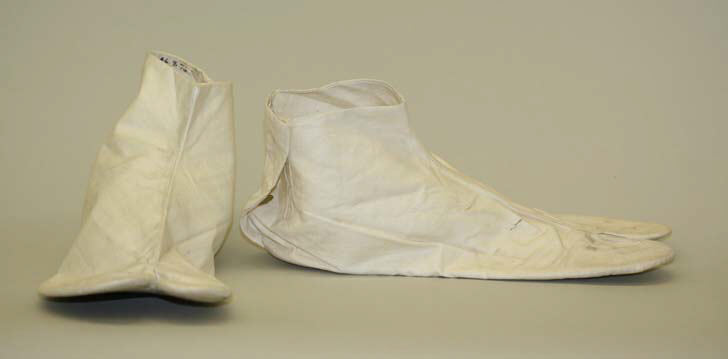
Cotton tabi, 1700s

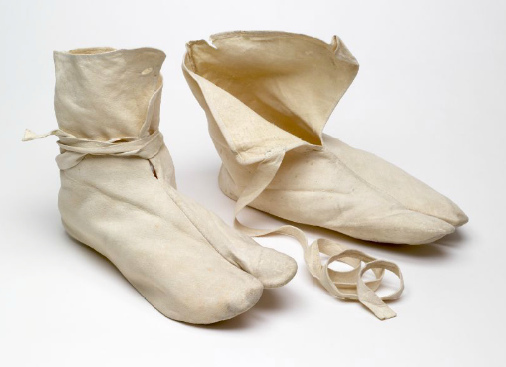
Cloth tabi with ties, early 1900s

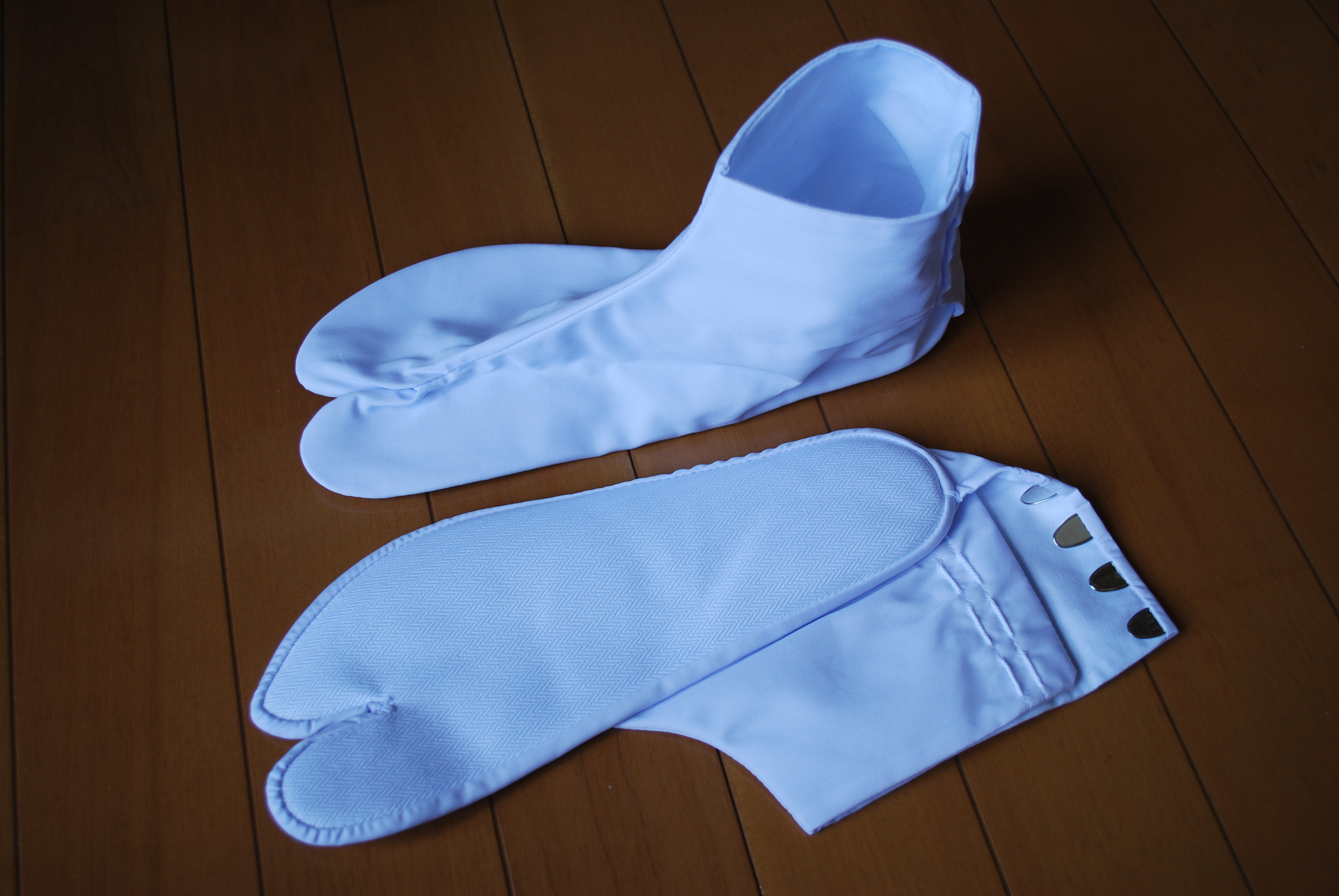
Modern tabi with kohaze hook-and-loop fasteners

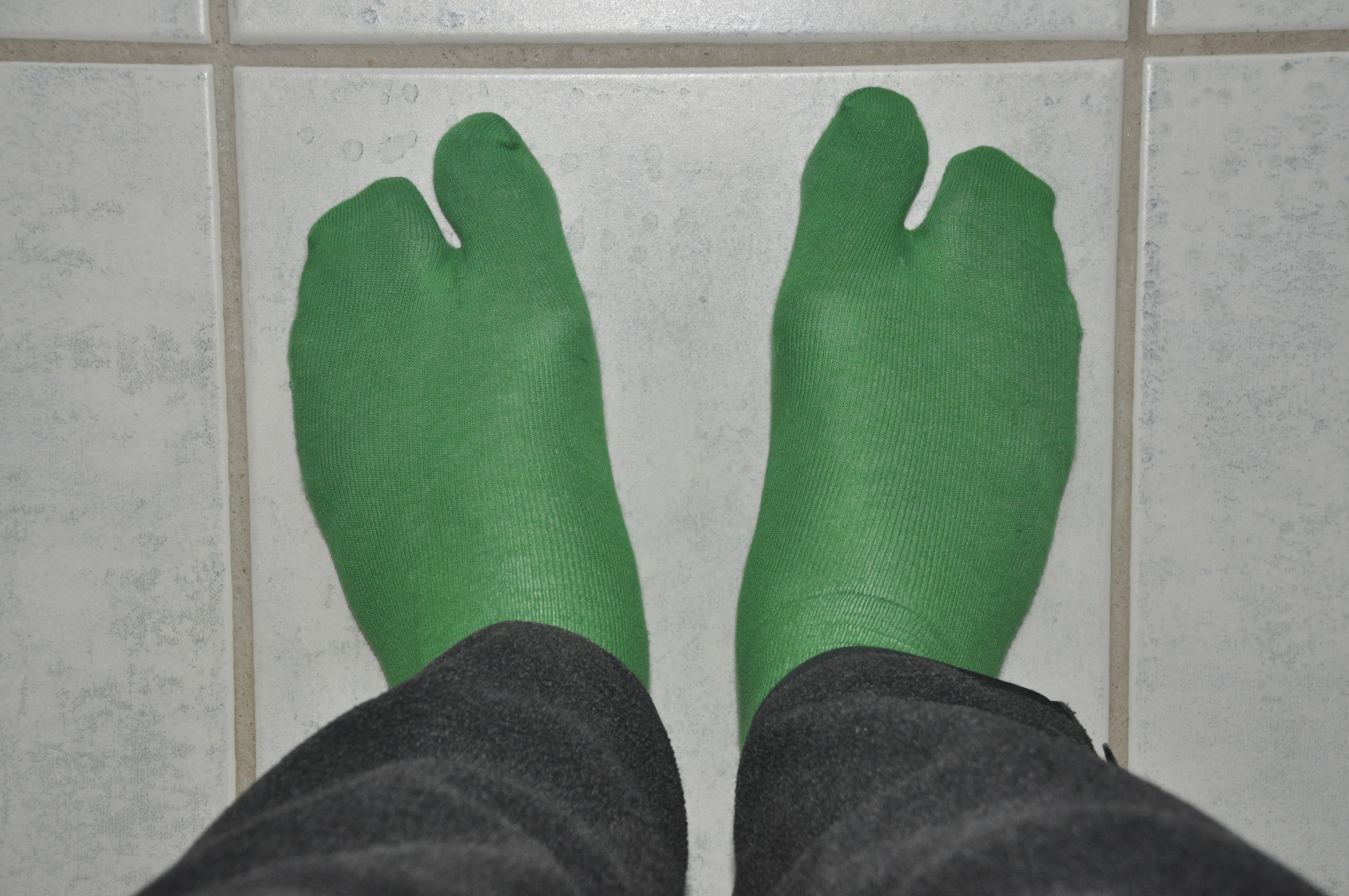
Knitted stretch-on tabi, no fasteners

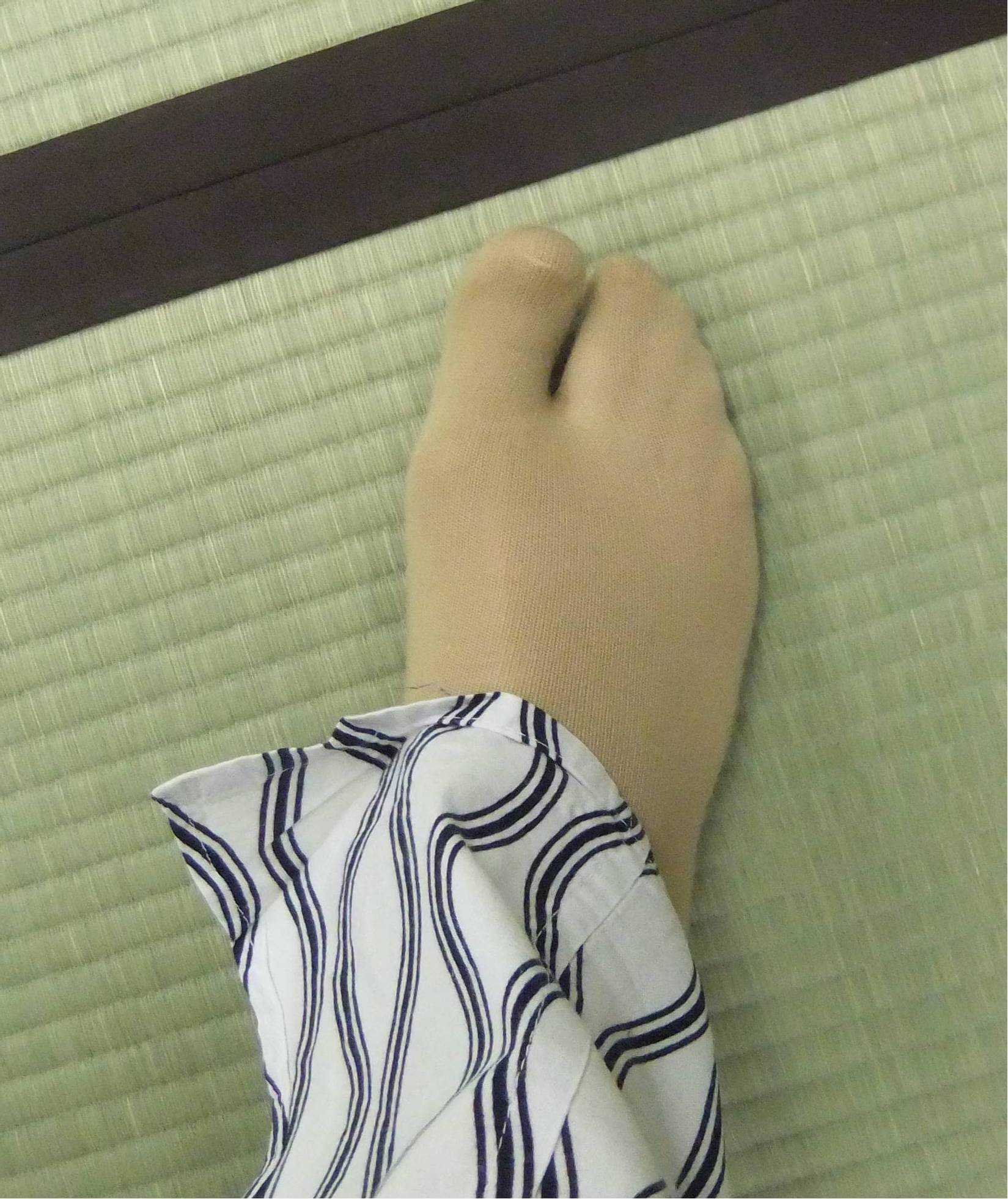
Sheer tabi

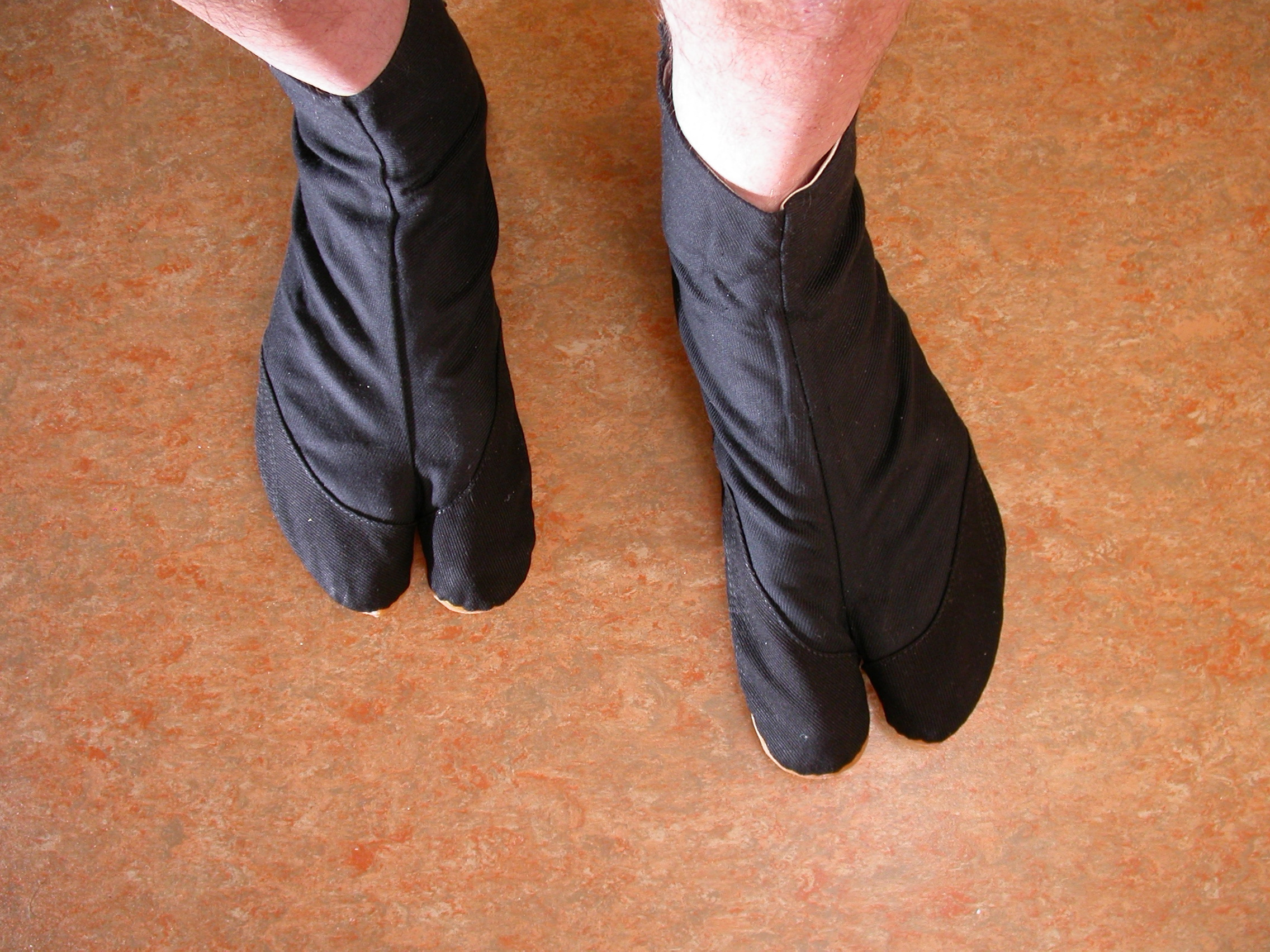
Woven tabi

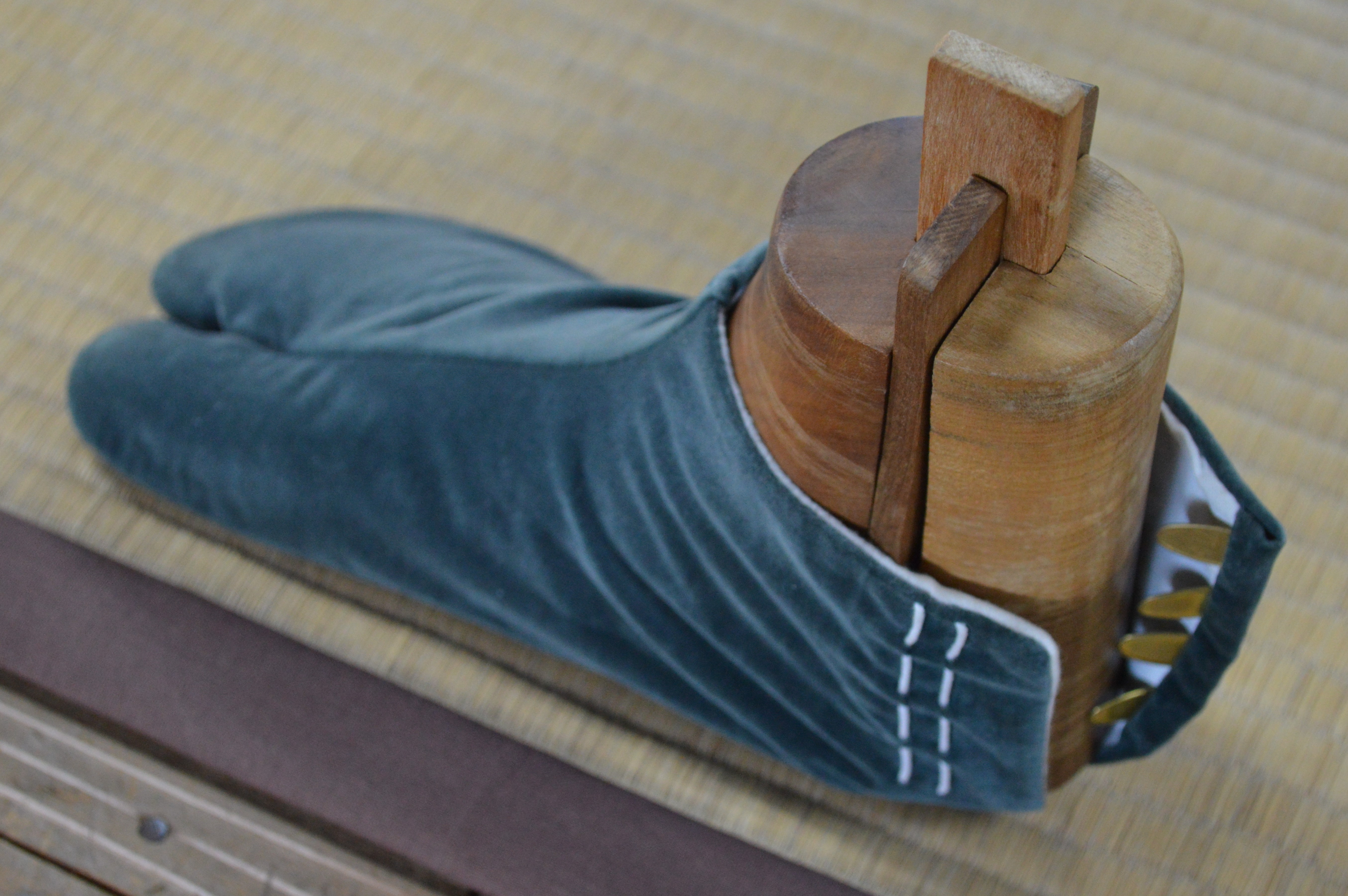
Close-up of kohaze

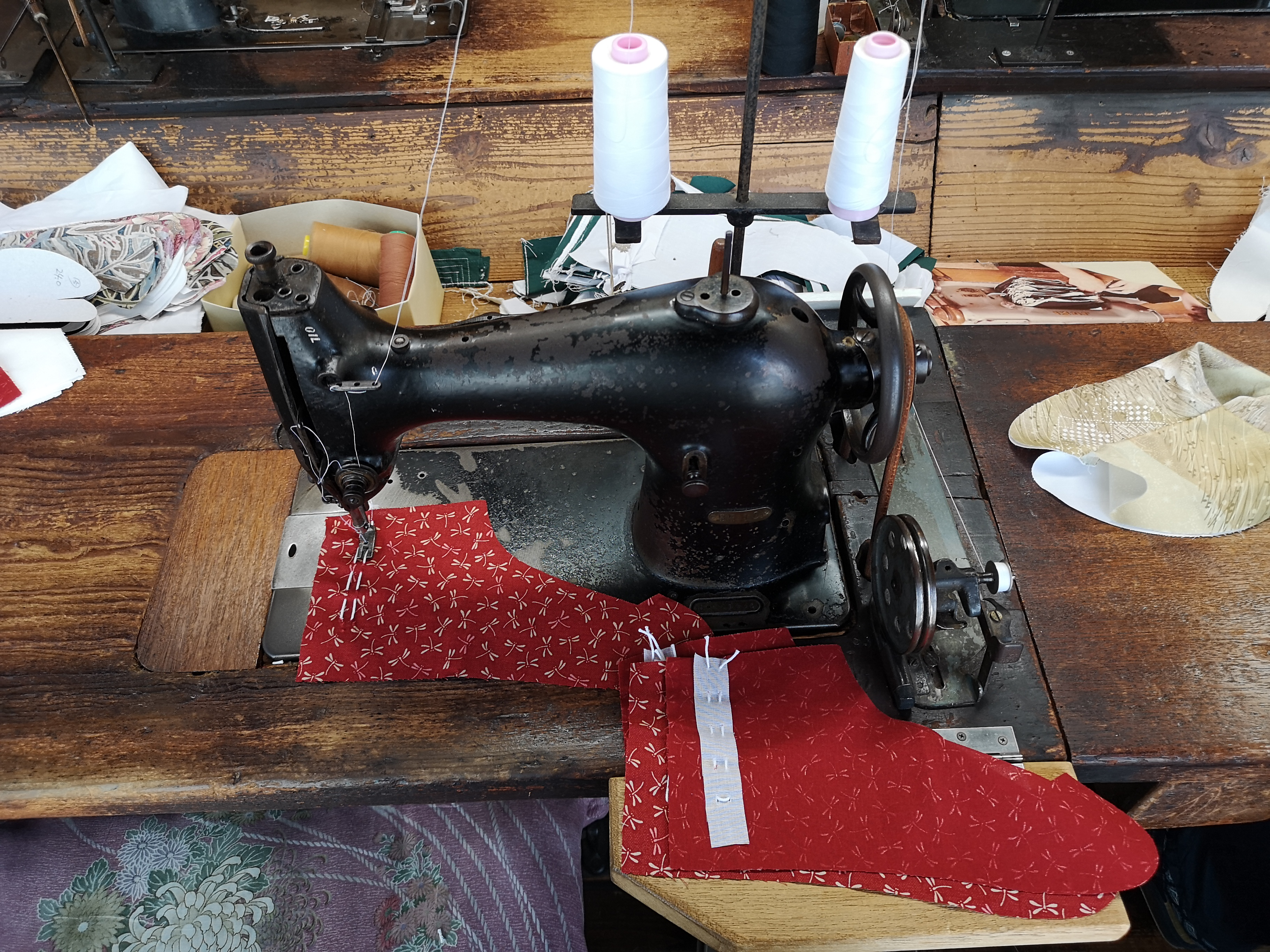
Sewing the loops

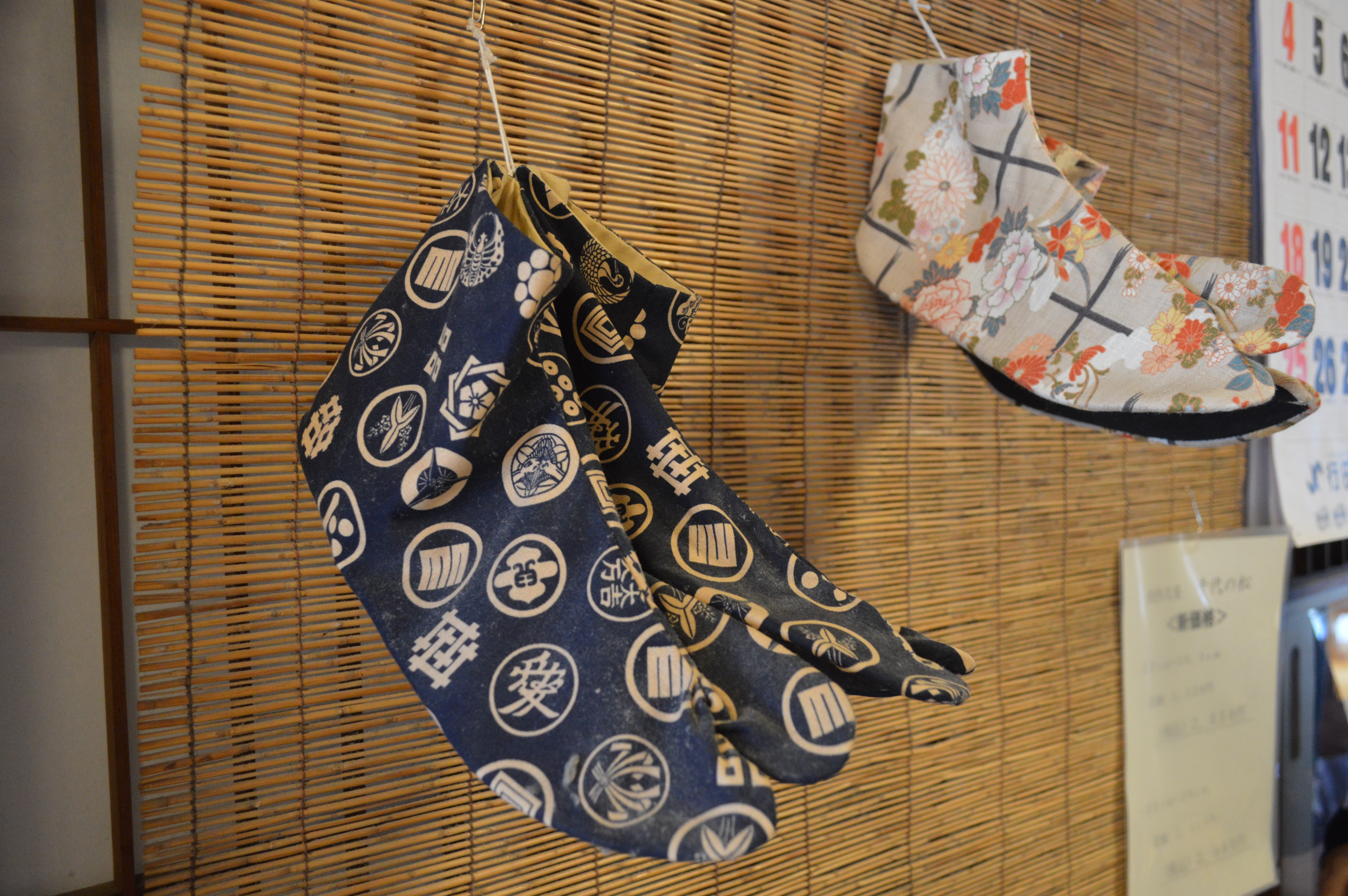
Brightly patterned tabi

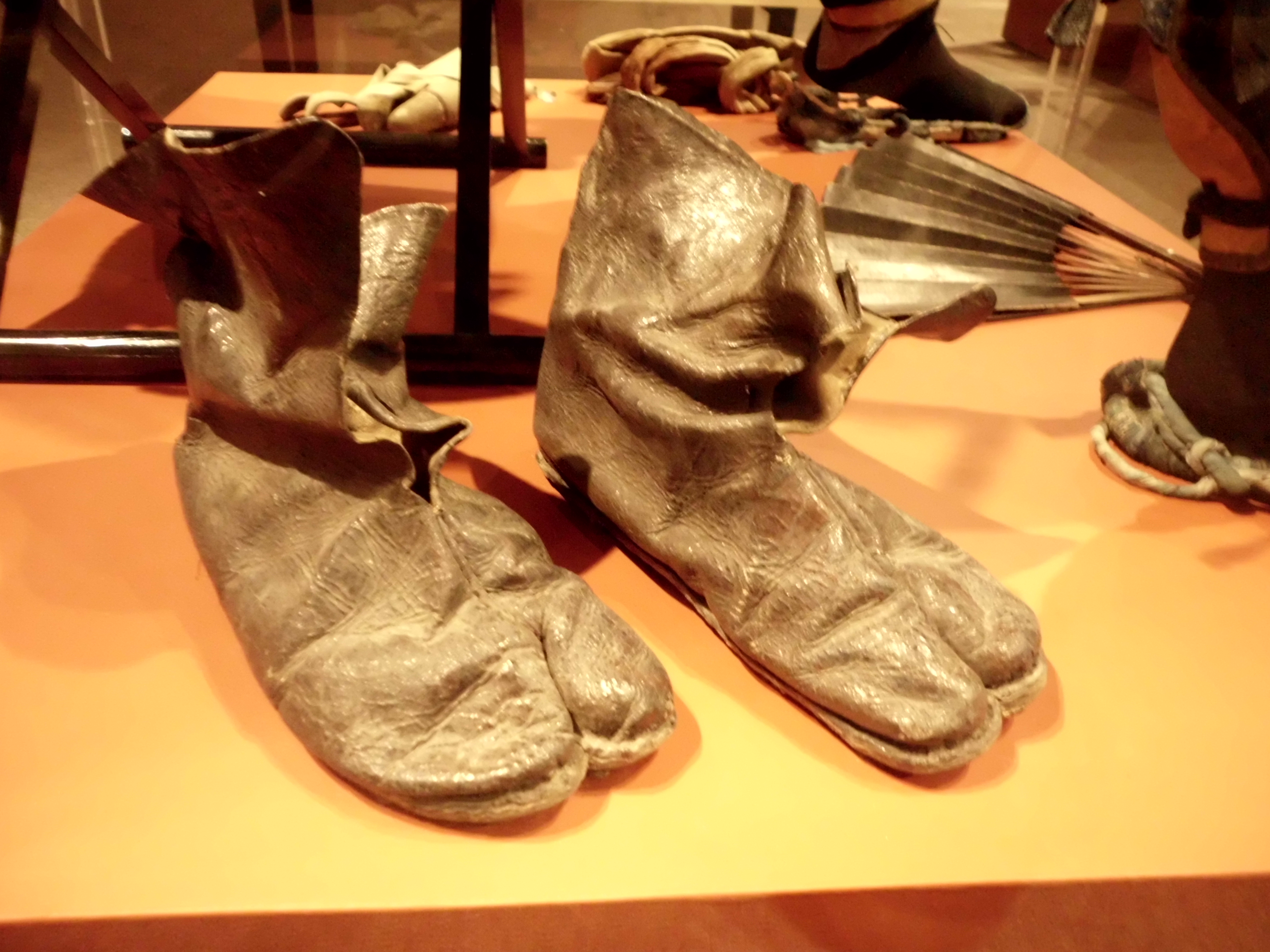
Leather tabi, Edo period (1603–1867), precursors to modern jika-tabi

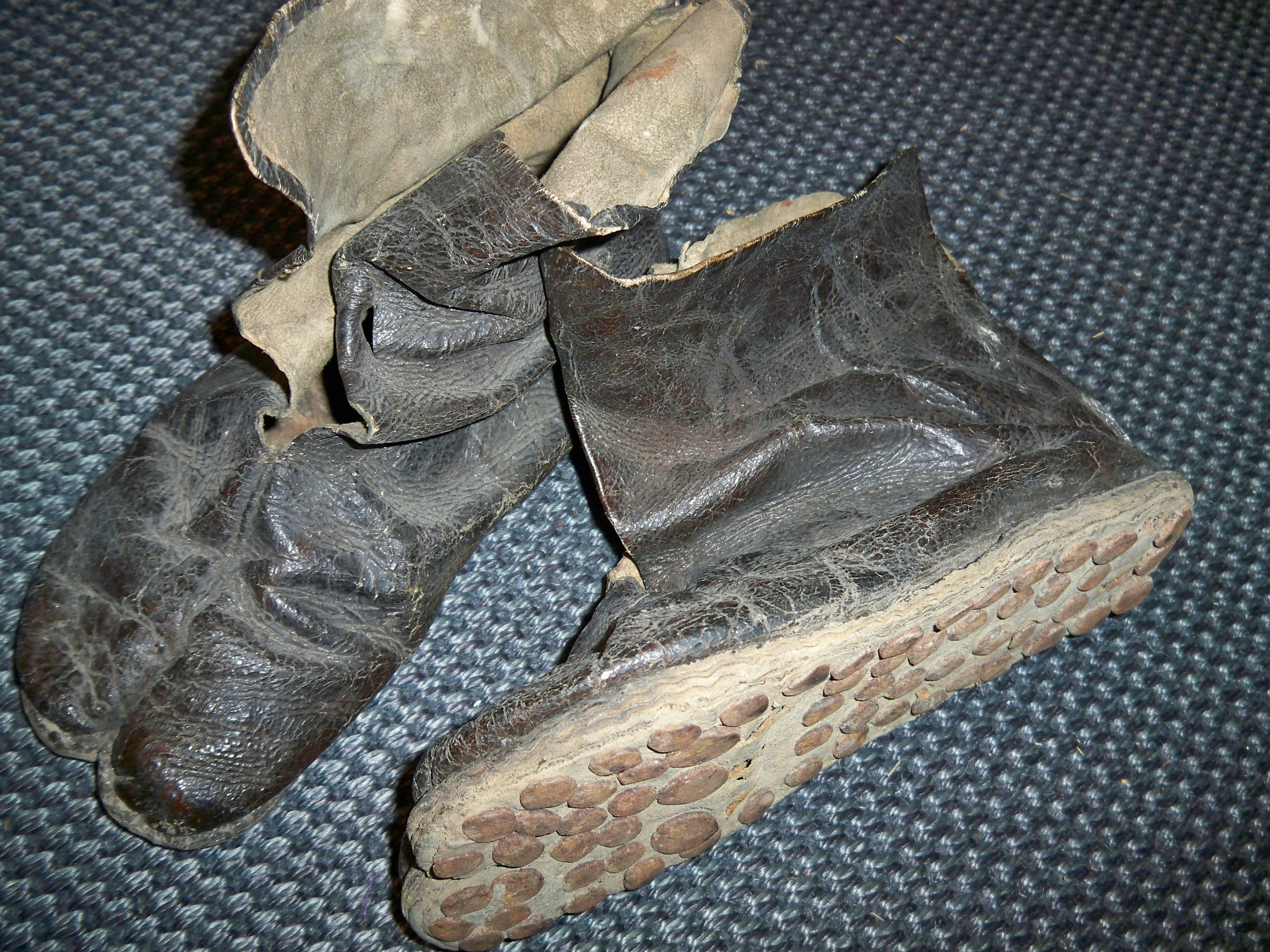
Tabi with reinforced hobnailed soles, Edo period

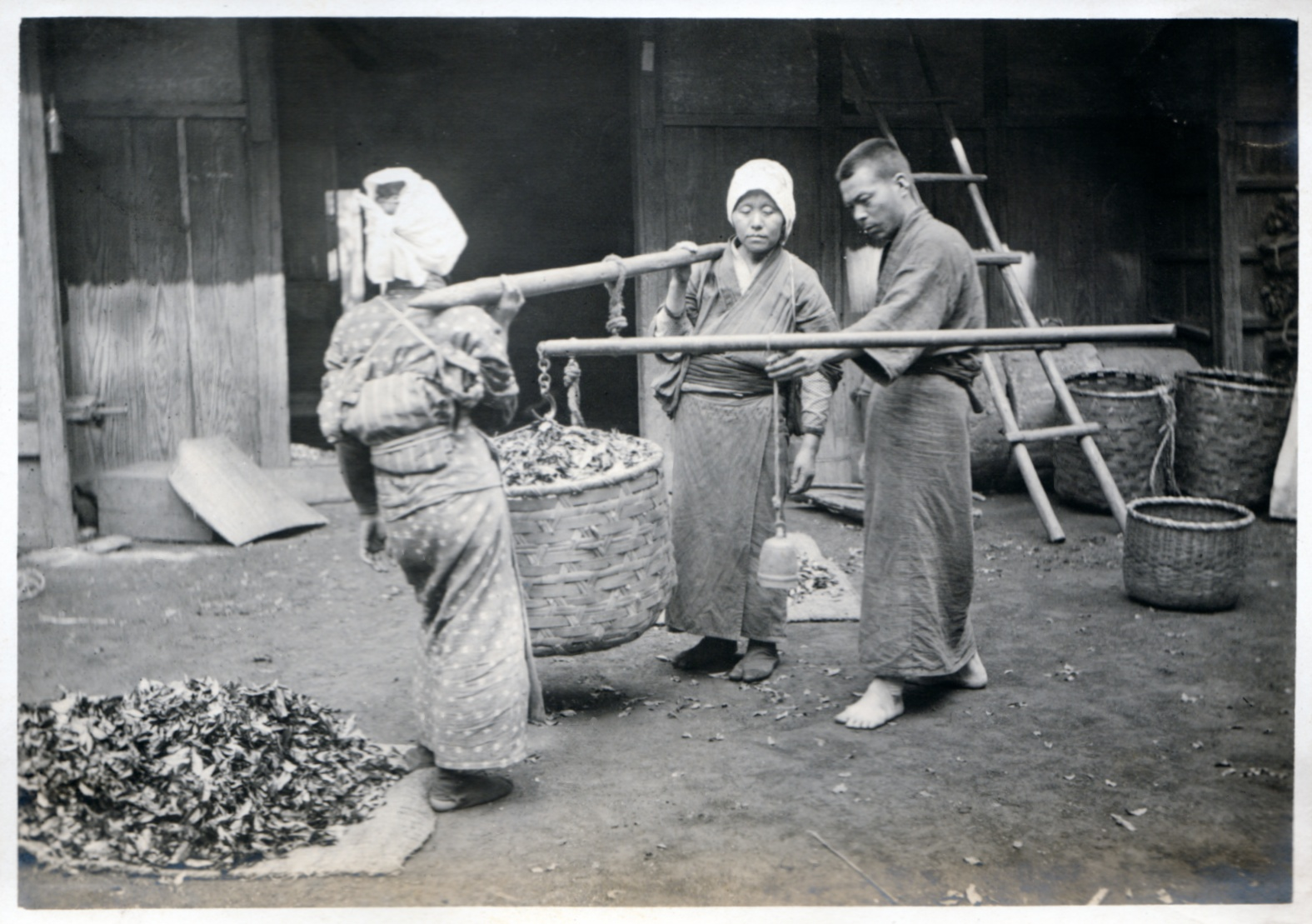
Farmworkers wearing outdoor tabi, 1912

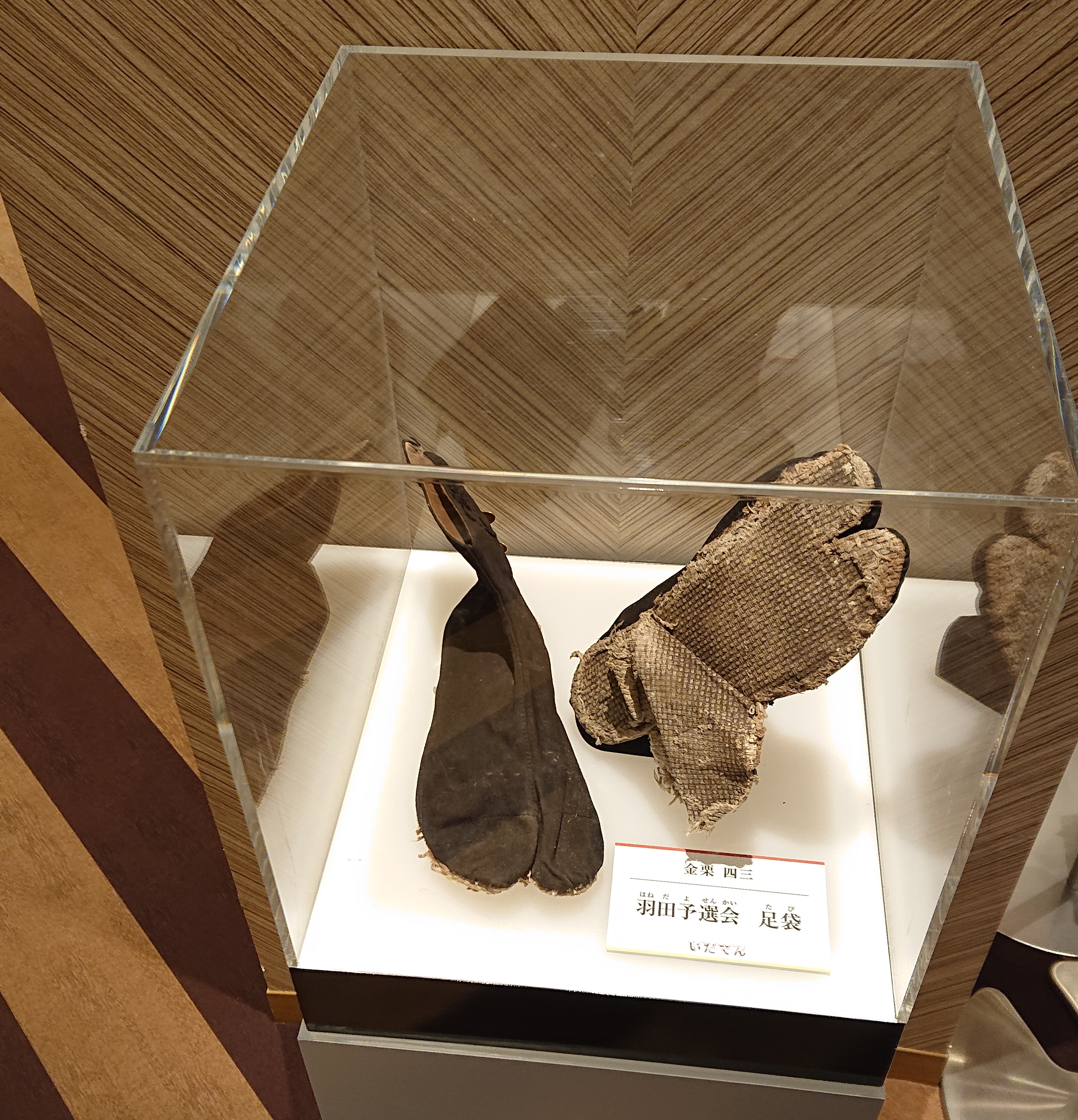
Early 20th century cloth-soled tabi boots (reconstruction of 1912 marathon tabi)

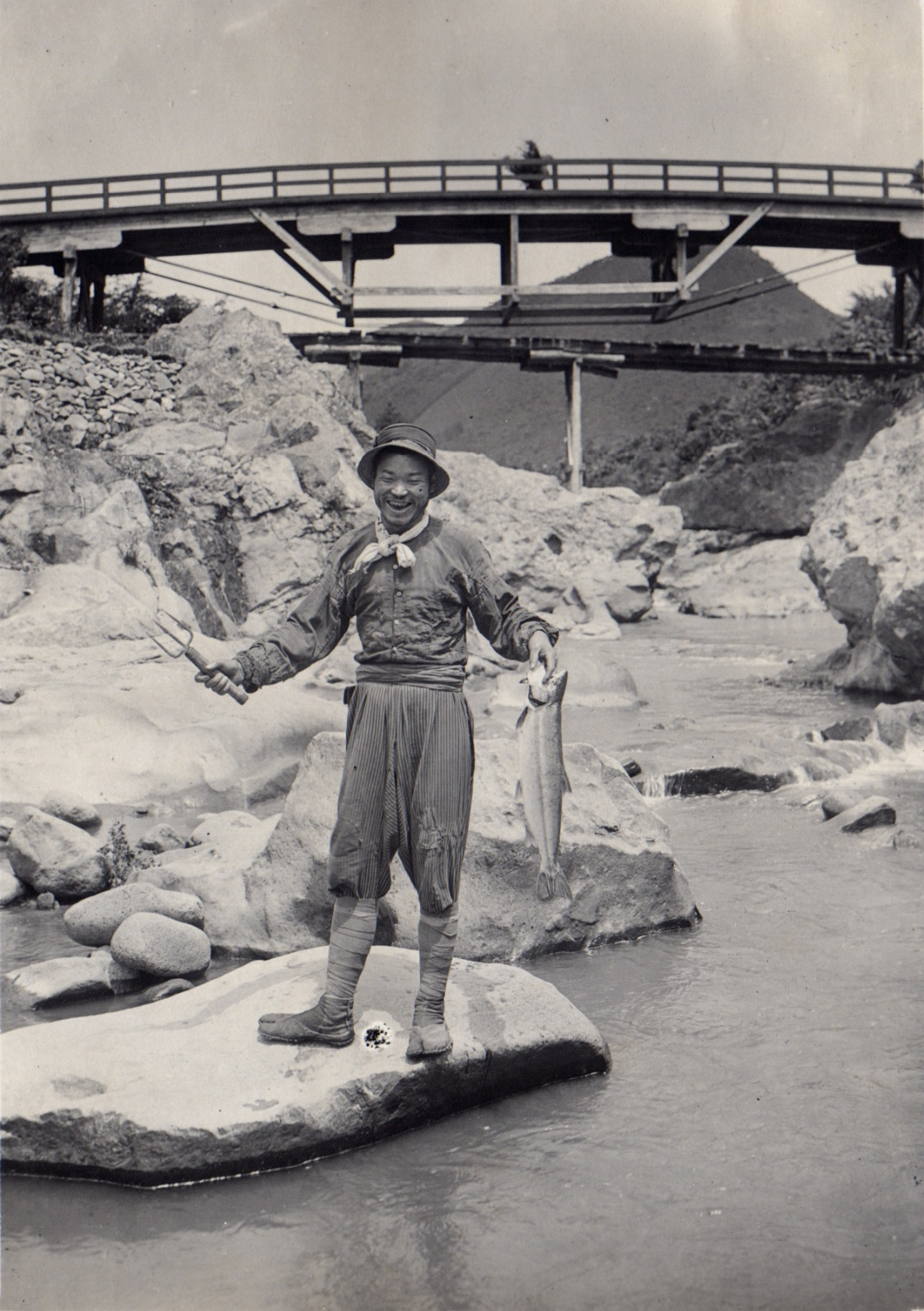
A fisherman wearing tabi with sewn-on woven-straw soles, 1915

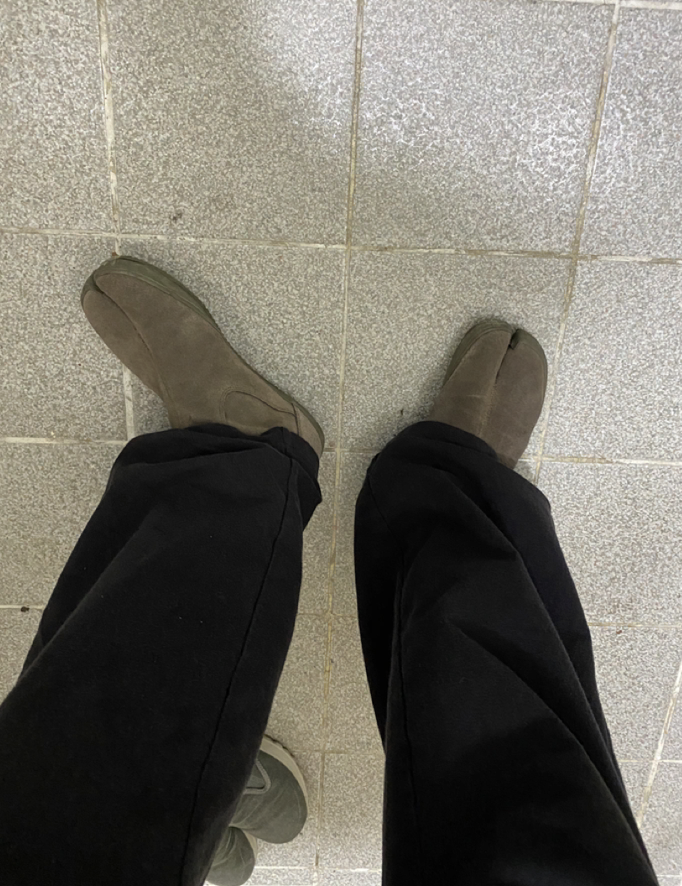
Modern tabi boots designed by Maison Margiela

== See also ==
- Toe socks
