= Toe socks =

Sock with individual toes

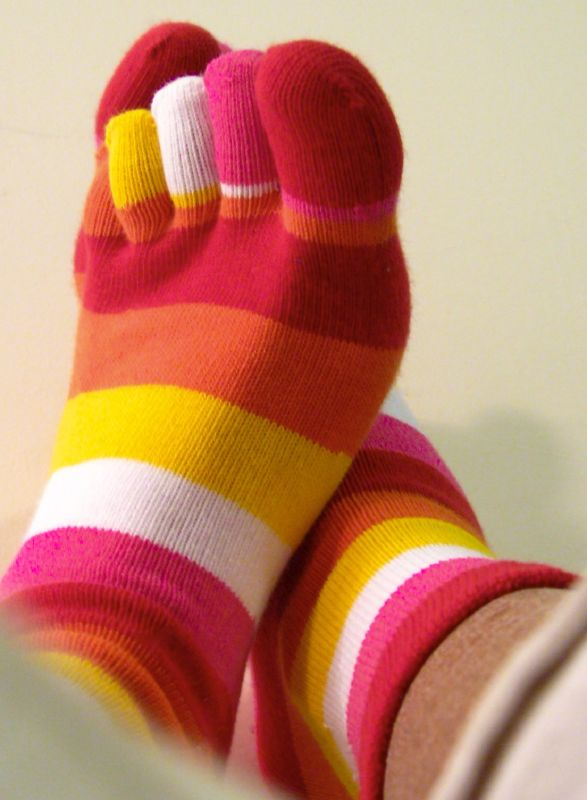
Striped toe socks

Toe socks (also known as fingersocks, glove socks, 5-toe socks or digital socks) are socks that have been knitted so that each toe is individually encased the same way as fingers within a glove.

All sock lengths are available as toe socks, from no-show style to anklet and ankle socks through to knee-high and over-knee socks. They are also available with rubberised undersides, as an alternative to bare feet for yoga. Toe socks are designed and available for both men and women.

== History ==
The original concept of toe socks may be attributed to Ethel Russell (also known as Ethel Wynhym) of Pennsylvania. On June 14, 1969, she filed a copyright with the United States Copyright Office for two drawings of footwear which she termed, "mitten toe socks" and "glove socks". She was unable to maintain the exclusive rights for their manufacture, however, because copyright law of the United States does not afford this protection – patent law does.

An earlier reference to "stockings with toes" was made by physician Walter Vaughan in 1792, speculating that these would prevent discomfort from the accumulation of sweat between the toes. It is not clear whether Vaughan ever put this idea into action.

Toe socks became popular in the United States during the 1970s and made a comeback in the 1990s as a novelty item worn by adolescents. During the 1970s, it was fashionable for girls to wear clogs or buffalo sandals with toe socks. In colder weather, they may be worn with flip-flops. During this time, such socks were typically knee high in length with bright stripes and glittery threads in their design. They also had a practical value in keeping the feet warm, including the spots between the toes.

By 2004, toe socks were available in plain colors and being adopted as normal footwear. They have even been worn in outer space – notably by astronaut Sandra Magnus on the International Space Station during the STS-135 mission in 2011.

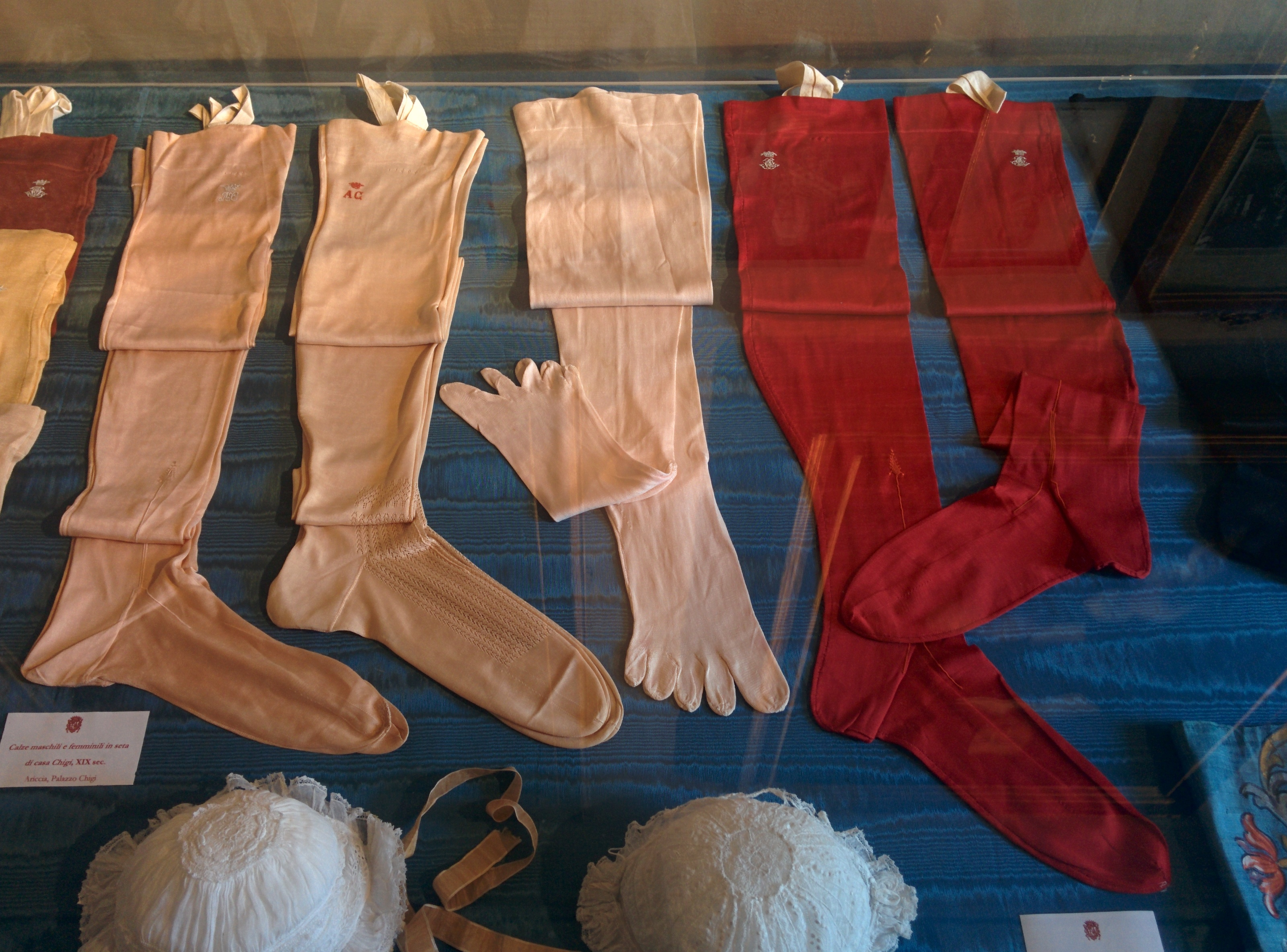
19th-century stockings with toes exposed at Palazzo Chigi in Ariccia, near Rome, Italy.

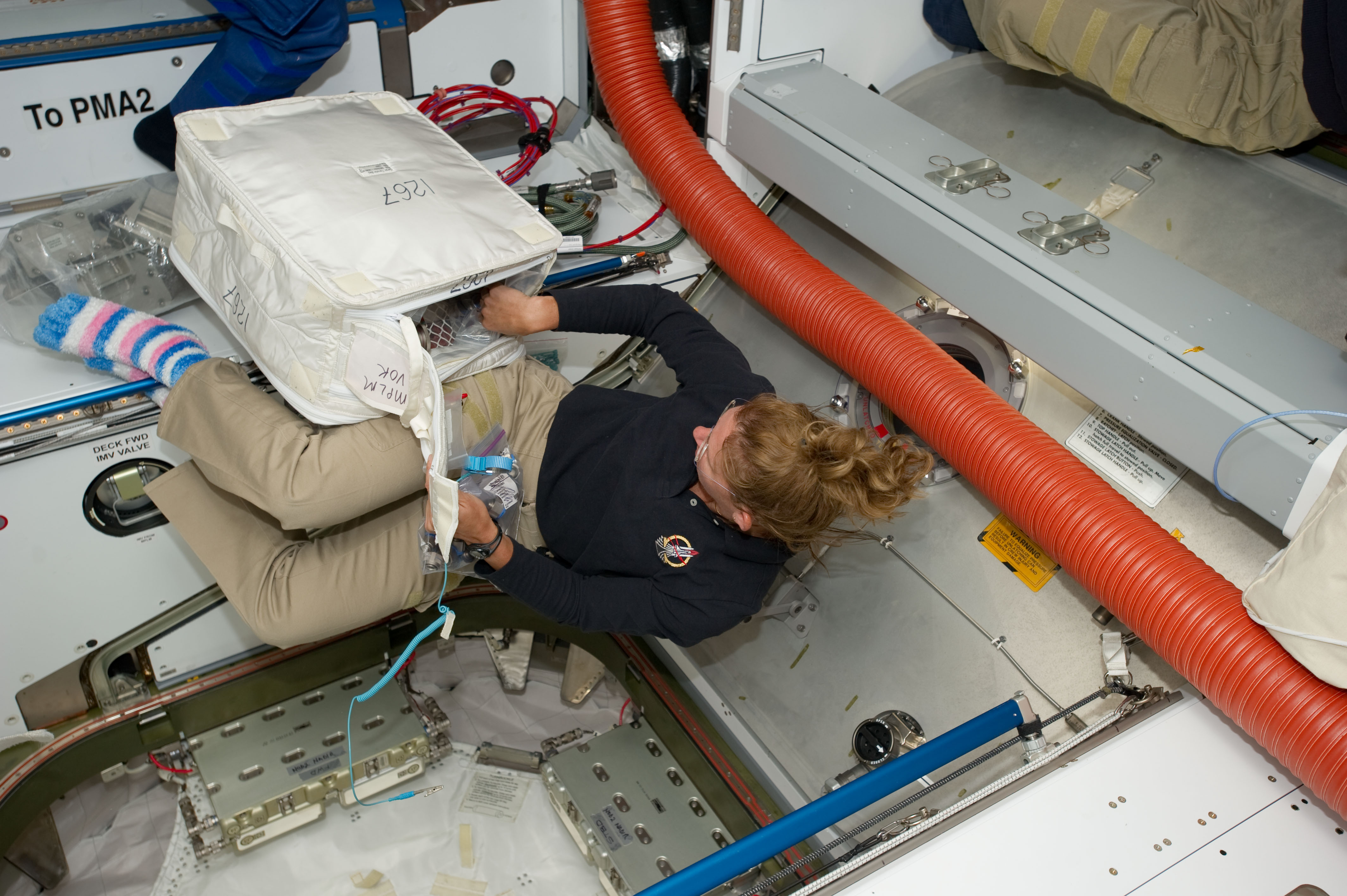
Sandra Magnus in toe socks (STS-135).

== Variants ==
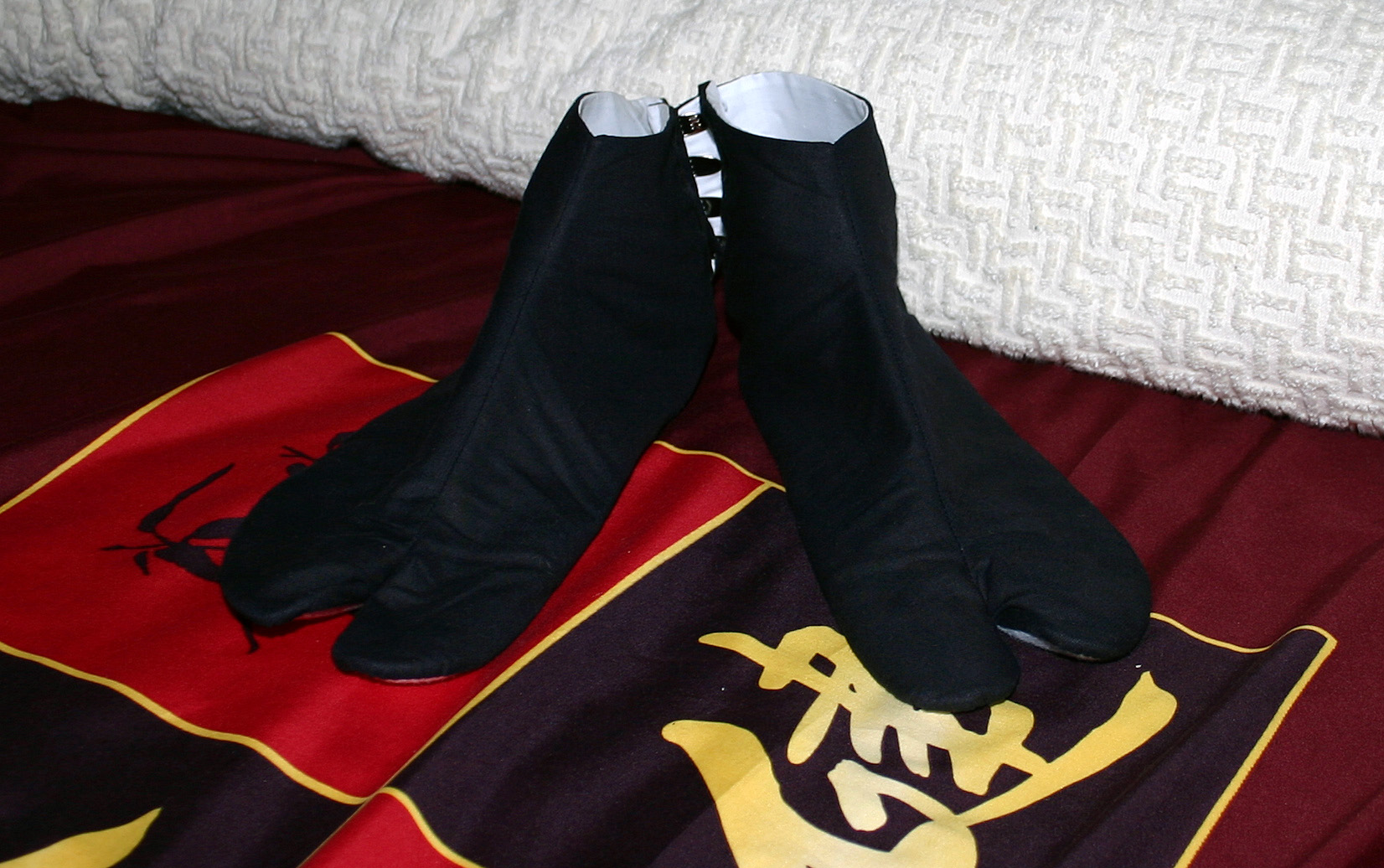
Japanese tabi socks

One of the earliest variants of toe socks is the Japanese tabi, dating back to the 16th century. These are split-toed socks with two compartments – one smaller compartment for the big toe, and a larger compartment for the four remaining toes. This allows them to be worn with zori or geta sandals.

Modern variants of toe socks are designed primarily for either comfort or athletics. In 2004, a patent was filed with the Intellectual Property Office in the United Kingdom for a product called "toe socks"; however, their description differs: "A half sock which covers the toes to provide comfort under footwear. Preferably the socks are unseen when worn with mules or slingback shoes."

Variants have also evolved to include compression socks and other specialty performance models for professional sports as well as uses which require high durability. In sports, athletic versions of toe socks may be useful to triathletes and Ultramarathon runners who suffer from frequent interdigital friction blisters. One version of sock referred to as "toe socks" is actually a reverse version – this is a covering for the foot and ankle with the toes cut out, leaving them bare. This provides a non-slip surface and provides for a more complete range of motion for form-fitting yoga, Pilates, or Wii Fit exercises.

== See also ==
- Anklet
- Dress socks
- Vibram FiveFingers – a five-toed, minimalist running shoe
