= Dress sock =

Clothing

Dress socks are dress clothes socks for men traditionally in dark colours like black, blue, gray or brown. For more casual wear they are sometimes offered in other colours or checkered patterns. Dress socks are worn in accompaniment to dress shoes of varying styles depending on dress codes or personal preferences.

Dress socks come in a variety of heights. They come ankle-high, mid-calf high (the most common), and over the calf. Dress socks have been known to slip down the leg, causing the wearer to have to constantly pull them up. In the past, men would buy garters or sock suspenders to correct this until the introduction of better elastics in the 1960s such as spandex, thus rendering them mostly obsolete. However, some men with larger calves need extra assistance of garters to keep their socks from slipping.

== See also ==
- Sock
- Toe socks
