= GeGeGe no Kitarō (1985 TV series) =

Production by Toei Animation Co., Ltd.

- Also known as: GeGeGe no Kitarō: Jigoku Hen
- Genre: Comedy horror Supernatural
- Based on: GeGeGe no Kitarō by Shigeru Mizuki
- Directed by: Osamu Kasai; Hiroki Shibata
- Music by: Masahiro Kawasaki
- Opening theme: GeGeGe no Kitarō by Yoshi Ikuzō
- Ending theme: Obake ga Ikuzō by Yoshi Ikuzō
- Country of origin: Japan
- Original language: Japanese
- No. of episodes: 115

Production
- Producer: Kenji Yokoyama
- Editors: Masaaki Hanai; Shinji Shimizu; Yasuhiro Yoshikawa
- Production companies: Fuji Television; Yomiko Advertising (Note: (eps. 1–108)); Toei Animation

Original release
- Network: FNS (Fuji TV)
- Release: 12 October 1985 – 21 March 1988

The third GeGeGe no Kitarō anime was aired from October 12, 1985, to March 21, 1988. It ran for 115 episodes. At episode 109 the series became GeGeGe no Kitarō: Jigoku Hen (ゲゲゲの鬼太郎 地獄編, GeGeGe no Kitarō: The Hell Arc). It was produced by Toei Animation and broadcast on Fuji TV.

== Cast ==
Character	Voice actor
Kitaro	Keiko Toda
Medama-Oyaji	Isamu Tanonaka
Nezumi Otoko	Kei Tomiyama
Neko Musume	Yūko Mita
Konaki-jiji	Ichirō Nagai
Sunakake-Baba	Hiroko Emori
Ittan-Momen	Jôji Yanami
Nurikabe	Yusaku Yara
Yumeko Tendō	Kyoko Irokawa
Backbeard	Hidekatsu Shibata
Nurariyon	Koichi Chiba (episode 4)
Nurariyon	Takeshi Aono

== Episodes ==
No.	Title	Directed by	Written by	Animation directed by	Art directed by	Original release date
1	"The Mysterious Yokai Castle Appears!!"; Transliteration: "Nazo no Yōkai-jō Shutsugen!!" (Japanese: 謎の妖怪城出現!!)	Osamu Kasai	Hiroyuki Hoshiyama	Shigetaka Kiyoyama	Taizaburo Abe	October 12, 1985
2	"Old Man in the Mirror"; Transliteration: "Kagami Jijii" (Japanese: 鏡じじい)	Hiroki Shibata	Junki Takegami	Naohito Takahashi	Taizaburo Abe	October 19, 1985
3	"The Cat Hermit"; Transliteration: "Neko-Sennin" (Japanese: ネコ仙人)	Takashi Tanazawa	Junki Takegami	Iku Ishiguro	Taizaburo Abe	October 26, 1985
4	"The Yokai Nurarihyon"; Transliteration: "Yōkai Nurarihyon" (Japanese: 妖怪ぬらりひょん)	Tetsuo Imazawa	Yukiyoshi Ohashi	Fukuo Yamamoto	Taizaburo Abe	November 2, 1985
5	"The Diamond Yokai Wheel Monk"; Transliteration: "Daiya Yōkai Wanyūdō" (Japanese: ダイヤ妖怪輪入道)	Osamu Kasai	Satoshi Namiki	Yasuhiro Yamaguchi	Taizaburo Abe	November 9, 1985
6	"Going to Hell! The Ghost Train!!"; Transliteration: "Jigoku-gyo! Yūrei Densha!!" (Japanese: 地獄行!幽霊電車!!)	Masahisa Ishida	Hiroyuki Hoshiyama	Jōji Yanase	Shinji Itō & Kunio Kaneshima	November 16, 1985
7	"The Yokai Iso-Onna and Her Child"; Transliteration: "Kozure Yōkai Iso-Onna" (Japanese: 子連れ妖怪磯女)	Hiroki Shibata	Junki Takegami	Yoshinori Kanemori	Taizaburo Abe	November 23, 1985
8	"Daruma's Yokai Consultation Bureau"; Transliteration: "Daruma Yōkai Sōdanjo" (Japanese: だるま妖怪相談所)	Nobutaka Nishizawa	Hiroyuki Hoshiyama	Satoru Iriyoshi	Hiroshi Washizaki	November 30, 1985
9	"The Immortal Yokai Water Tiger"; Transliteration: "Fujimi no Yōkai Suikō" (Japanese: 不死身の妖怪水虎)	Masahisa Ishida	Satoshi Namiki	Shigetaka Kiyoyama	Tsutomu Fujita	December 7, 1985
10	"Yaksha's Demonic Melody"; Transliteration: "Akuma no Merodii Yasha" (Japanese: 悪魔のメロディー・夜叉)	Osamu Kasai & Takashi Tanazawa	Junki Takegami	Iku Ishiguro	Shinji Itō & Kunio Kaneshima	December 14, 1985
11	"Yokai Fox Hakusanbo"; Transliteration: "Yōkai Kitsune Hakusanbō" (Japanese: 妖怪キツネ白山坊)	Hiroki Shibata	Yukiyoshi Ohashi	Masami Shimoda	Hiroshi Washizaki	December 21, 1985
12	"House Guardian and Hat Guardian"; Transliteration: "Zashiki-warashi to Kasa-Jizō" (Japanese: ざしきわらしと笠地蔵)	Tetsuo Imazawa	Hiroyuki Hoshiyama	Fukuo Yamamoto	Tsutomu Fujita	December 28, 1985
13	"The Folding Monk"; Transliteration: "Oritatami-nyūdō" (Japanese: おりたたみ入道)	Yugo Serikawa	Junki Takegami	Satoru Iriyoshi	Shinji Itō & Kunio Kaneshima	January 4, 1986
14	"The Ageless Yokai Turban Shell Devil!?"; Transliteration: "Furōfushi!? Yōkai Sazae-oni" (Japanese: 不老不死!?妖怪さざえ鬼)	Nobutaka Nishizawa	Junki Takegami	Yoshinori Kanemori	Hiroshi Washizaki	January 11, 1986
15	"The Freezing Yokai Snow Woman"; Transliteration: "Reitō Yōjai - Yukinko" (Japanese: 冷凍妖怪・雪ん子)	Kon Koyama & Masahiko Fukutome	Yukiyoshi Ohashi	Tatsuya Furukawa	Tsutomu Fujita	January 18, 1986
16	"Yokai No-Face"; Transliteration: "Yōkai Nopperabō" (Japanese: 妖怪のっぺらぼう)	Hiroki Shibata	Hiroyuki Hoshiyama	Yasuhiro Yamaguchi	Shinji Itō & Kunio Kaneshima	January 25, 1986
17	"Ancient Yokai Fuzzy Hair"; Transliteration: "Kodai Yōkai - Keukegen" (Japanese: 古代妖怪・毛羽毛現)	Masahisa Ishida	Yukiyoshi Ohashi	Shigetaka Kiyoyama	Hiroshi Washizaki	February 1, 1986
18	"Yokai Tenko's Counterattack from the Earth's Core"; Transliteration: "Yōkai Tenko Chitei Ōkoku no Gyakushū" (Japanese: 妖怪天狐地底王国の逆襲)	Takashi Tanazawa	Hiroyuki Hoshiyama	Kiyoshi Matsumoto	Tsutomu Fujita	February 8, 1986
19	"The Dream Yokai Pillow Switcher"; Transliteration: "Yume Yōkai Makura-Gaeshi" (Japanese: ゆめ妖怪まくらがえし)	Tetsuo Imazawa	Junki Takegami	Fukuo Yamamoto	Yoshiyuki Yamamoto	February 15, 1986
20	"Mermaid Love"; Transliteration: "Hangyōjin no Koi" (Japanese: 半魚人の恋)	Yugo Serikawa	Junki Takegami	Satoru Iriyoshi	Hiroshi Washizaki	February 22, 1986
21	"Top Yokai Amamehagi"; Transliteration: "Koma Yōkai Amamehagi" (Japanese: コマ妖怪あまめはぎ)	Takeshi Shirato & Akio Yamadera	Satoshi Namiki	Akira Shimizu	Tsutomu Fujita	March 1, 1986
22	"Mean-Spirited Yokai Amanojaku"; Transliteration: "Ijiwaru Yōkai Amanojaku" (Japanese: いじわる妖怪天邪鬼)	Hiroki Shibata	Yukiyoshi Ohashi	Tomoyuki Matsumoto	Yoshiyuki Yamamoto	March 8, 1986
23	"Electric Yokai Kaminari"; Transliteration: "Denki Yōkai Kaminari" (Japanese: 電気妖怪かみなり)	Masahisa Ishida	Junki Takegami	Yasuhiro Yamaguchi	Hiroshi Washizaki	March 15, 1986
24	"Children are Disappearing!? Yokai Ubume"; Transliteration: "Kodomo ga Kieru!? Yōkai Ubume" (Japanese: 子供が消える!?妖怪うぶめ)	Nobutaka Nishizawa	Haruya Yamazaki	Shigetaka Kiyoyama	Tsutomu Fujita	March 22, 1986
25	"Yokai Shiver"; Transliteration: "Yōkai Buru-Buru" (Japanese: 妖怪ぶるぶる)	Takashi Tanazawa	Junki Takegami	Yasuyoshi Kaneko	Yoshiyuki Yamamoto	March 29, 1986
26	"The Ghost Nighter"; Transliteration: "Obake Naitā" (Japanese: おばけナイター)	Tetsuo Imazawa	Hiroyuki Hoshiyama	Fukuo Yamamoto	Hiroshi Washizaki	April 5, 1986
27	"Yokai Drooping Sack"; Transliteration: "Yōkai Fukuro-sage" (Japanese: 妖怪ふくろさげ)	Hiroki Shibata	Yukiyoshi Ohashi	Satoru Iriyoshi	Tsutomu Fujita	April 12, 1986
28	"Return the Land!! Yokai Mud Monk"; Transliteration: "Ta wo Kaese!! Yōkai Dorotabō" (Japanese: 田を返せ!!妖怪泥田坊)	Takeshi Shirado & Akio Yamadera	Haruya Yamazaki	Akira Shimizu	Hiroshi Washizaki	April 19, 1986
29	"Yokai Drought God"; Transliteration: "Yōkai Hiderigami" (Japanese: 妖怪ひでり神)	Yugo Serikawa	Junki Takegami	Tomoyuki Matsumoto	Masato Itō	May 3, 1986
30	"Yokai Look Up Monk"; Transliteration: "Yōkai Miage-nyūdō" (Japanese: 妖怪見上げ入道)	Masahisa Ishida	Hiroyuki Hoshiyama	Yasuhiro Yamaguchi	Tsutomu Fujita	May 10, 1986
31	"The Yokai of Obebe Swamp"; Transliteration: "Obebe-numa no Yōkai" (Japanese: オベベ沼の妖怪)	Hiroki Shibata	Yukiyoshi Ohashi	Katsuji Matsumoto	Hiroshi Washizaki	May 17, 1986
32	"Kitaro in Danger! The Great Yokai Trial"; Transliteration: "Kitarō Ayaushi! Yōkai Daisaiban" (Japanese: 鬼太郎危うし!妖怪大裁判)	Masayuki Akehi	Junki Takegami	Shigetaka Kiyoyama	Tsutomu Fujita	May 24, 1986
33	"Yokai Filth Licker's Sad Counterattack"; Transliteration: "Yōkai Akaname Kanashimi no Gyakushū" (Japanese: 妖怪あかなめ哀しみの逆襲)	Akinori Nagaoka & Tetsuo Imazawa	Hiroyuki Hoshiyama	Kahoru Hirata	Hiroshi Washizaki	May 31, 1986
34	"The Cat Ghoul of Highway 0"; Transliteration: "Bake-Neko Kokudō 0-gōsen" (Japanese: ばけ猫国道0号線)	Hiroki Shibata	Hiroyuki Hoshiyama	Satoru Iriyoshi	Tsutomu Fujita	June 14, 1986
35	"Yokai Red Tongue's 1,000 Year Kingdom"; Transliteration: "Yōkai Akashita no Sennen-Ōkoku" (Japanese: 妖怪赤舌の千年王国)	Osamu Kasai	Yukiyoshi Ohashi	Tomoyuki Matsumoto	Hiroshi Washizaki	June 28, 1986
36	"Dimensional Yokai Cauldron Dweller"; Transliteration: "Ijigen Yōkai Kamanari" (Japanese: 異次元妖怪かまなり)	Akio Yamadera	Junki Takegami	Akira Shimizu	Tsutomu Fujita	July 5, 1986
37	"Yokai Creepy Mane"; Transliteration: "Yōkai Odoro-odoro" (Japanese: 妖怪おどろおどろ)	Masahisa Ishida	Hiroyuki Hoshiyama	Katsuji Matsumoto	Toshiaki Marumori	July 12, 1986
38	"A Divine Curse!? Yokai Earth Snatcher"; Transliteration: "Tatari da~!? Yōkai Tsuchi-korobi" (Japanese: タタリだ〜!?妖怪土ころび)	Akinori Ōrai	Yukiyoshi Ohashi	Yoshinobu Inano	Hiroshi Washizaki	July 19, 1986
39	"Granny Datsue of the Sanzu River"; Transliteration: "Sanzu no Kawa no Datsue-babaa" (Japanese: 三途の川のだつえばばあ)	Masayuki Akehi	Junki Takegami	Satoru Iriyoshi	Tsutomu Fujita	August 2, 1986
40	"Mt. Fuji Erupts!? Yokai Giant Head"; Transliteration: "Fujiyama Daifunka!? Yōkai Ōkubi" (Japanese: 富士山大噴火!?妖怪大首)	Tetsuo Imazawa	Yukiyoshi Ohashi	Kahoru Hirata	Hiroshi Washizaki	August 9, 1986
41	"Fierce Battle! The Yokai Seikigahara"; Transliteration: "Gekisen! Yōkai Sekigahara" (Japanese: 激戦!妖怪関ヶ原)	Osamu Kasai	Junki Takegami	Shigetaka Kiyoyama	Tsutomu Fujita	August 23, 1986
42	"Yokai Ox Devil"; Transliteration: "Yōkai Gyūki" (Japanese: 妖怪牛鬼)	Masahisa Ishida	Hiroyuki Hoshiyama	Tomoyuki Matsumoto	Hiroshi Washizaki	August 30, 1986
43	"Plate Boy's Yokai Song Award"; Transliteration: "Sara-Kozō Yōkai Kayō Taishō" (Japanese: さら小僧妖怪歌謡大賞)	Takeshi Shirato	Junki Takegami	Akira Shimizu	Tsutomu Fujita	September 6, 1986
44	"Messenger from Another World, Death God"; Transliteration: "Ano Yo kara no Shisha Shinigami" (Japanese: あの世からの使者死神)	Akinori Ōrai	Yukiyoshi Ohashi	Katsuji Matsumoto	Hiroshi Washizaki	September 13, 1986
45	"Save the Yokai Flower!!"; Transliteration: "Yōkai Hana wo Sukue!!" (Japanese: 妖怪花を救え!!)	Masayuki Akehi	Hiroyuki Hoshiyama	Yoshinobu Inano	Tsutomu Fujita	September 20, 1986
46	"Yokai President Winged Cat"; Transliteration: "Yōkai Daitōryō Kōmori-Neko" (Japanese: 妖怪大統領こうもり猫)	Osamu Kasai	Yukiyoshi Ohashi	Satoru Iriyoshi	Hiroshi Washizaki	September 27, 1986
47	"Yokai Grow Up and the Vampire Tree"; Transliteration: "Yōkai Nobiagari to Kyūketsu-ki" (Japanese: 妖怪のびあがりと吸血木)	Tetsuo Imazawa	Junki Takegami	Kahoru Hirata	Tsutomu Fujita	October 4, 1986
48	"Yokai Iyami"; Transliteration: "Yōkai Iyami" (Japanese: 妖怪いやみ)	Masahisa Ishida	Hiroyuki Hoshiyama	Tomoyuki Matsumoto	Hiroshi Washizaki	October 11, 1986
49	"Reincarnated Devil's Yokai Murder Case"; Transliteration: "Yōkai Satsujin Jiken Onmoraki" (Japanese: 妖怪殺人事件おんもらき)	Masayuki Akehi	Junki Takegami	Yasuhiro Yamaguchi	Tsutomu Fujita	October 18, 1986
50	"Yokai Sea Boss' Rage"; Transliteration: "Yōkai Umizatō no Ikari" (Japanese: 妖怪海座頭の怒り)	Akinori Ōrai	Yukiyoshi Ohashi	Shigetaka Kiyoyama	Hiroshi Washizaki	October 25, 1986
51	"The World Yokai Rally"; Transliteration: "Sekai Yōkai Rarii" (Japanese: 世界妖怪ラリー)	Takeshi Shirato	Hiroyuki Hoshiyama	Akira Shimizu	Tsutomu Fujita	November 1, 1986
52	"Burning Nezumi-Otoko's Geta Battle"; Transliteration: "Moeru Nezumi-Otoko Geta Gassen" (Japanese: 燃えるねずみ男げた合戦)	Osamu Kasai	Junki Takegami	Satoru Iriyoshi	Hiroshi Washizaki	November 8, 1986
53	"Yokai Moryo of Plate Mansion"; Transliteration: "Sarayashiki no Yōkai Mōryō" (Japanese: 皿屋敷の妖怪モウリョウ)	Hiroki Shibata	Yukiyoshi Ohashi	Katsuji Matsumoto	Tsutomu Fujita	November 15, 1986
54	"The Demon Belial"; Transliteration: "Akuma Beriaru" (Japanese: 悪魔ベリアル)	Masahisa Ishida	Junki Takegami	Yoshinobu Inano	Hiroshi Washizaki	November 22, 1986
55	"Secret Orders!! Nezumi-Otoko Gets the Death Penalty"; Transliteration: "Maruhi Shiren!! Nezumi-Otoko wa Shikei da" (Japanese: （秘）指令！！ねずみ男は死刑だ)	Tetsuo Imazawa	Hiroyuki Hoshiyama	Kahoru Hirata	Tsutomu Fujita	November 29, 1986
56	"The Tanuki Army Conquers Japan!!"; Transliteration: "Tanuki Gundan Nihon Seifuku!!" (Japanese: タヌキ軍団日本征服!!)	Yugo Serikawa	Hiroyuki Hoshiyama	Tomoyuki Matsumoto	Hiroshi Washizaki	December 6, 1986
57	"The Tanuki Army Conquers Japan!!"; Transliteration: "Tanuki Gundan Nihon Seifuku!!" (Japanese: タヌキ軍団日本征服!!)	Yugo Serikawa	Hiroyuki Hoshiyama	Yasuhiro Yamaguchi	Hiroshi Washizaki	December 13, 1986
58	"Many Eyes of Yokai Castle"; Transliteration: "Yōkai-jō no Mokumokuren" (Japanese: 妖怪城の目目連)	Akinori Ōrai	Yukiyoshi Ohashi	Shigetaka Kiyoyama	Tsutomu Fujita	December 20, 1986
59	"The Evening Primrose Abrupt God"; Transliteration: "Yoimachigusa no Ushirogami" (Japanese: 宵待ち草の後神)	Takeshi Shirado	Yukiyoshi Ohashi	Akira Shimizu	Hiroshi Washizaki	December 27, 1986
60	"Giant Yokai Daidarabotchi"; Transliteration: "Kyōdai Yōkai Daidarabotchi" (Japanese: 巨人妖怪ダイダラボッチ)	Masahisa Ishida	Hiroyuki Hoshiyama	Katsuji Matsumoto	Tsutomu Fujita	January 3, 1987
61	"The Phantom Train"; Transliteration: "Maboroshi no Kisha" (Japanese: まぼろしの汽車)	Osamu Kasai	Yukiyoshi Ohashi	Tomoyuki Matsumoto	Hiroshi Washizaki	January 10, 1987
62	"Yokai Fiery Chariot Gyaku-Mochi Goroshi"; Transliteration: "Yōkai Kasha Gyaku-Mochi Goroshi!!" (Japanese: 妖怪火車逆モチ殺し!!)	Masayuki Akehi	Junki Takegami	Tomoyuki Matsumoto	Tsutomu Fujita	January 17, 1987
63	"The Demon Buer and Hanging Kettle"; Transliteration: "Akuma Bueru to Yakanzuru" (Japanese: 悪魔ブエルとヤカンズル)	Tetsuo Imazawa	Hiroyuki Hoshiyama	Kahoru Hirata	Hiroshi Washizaki	January 24, 1987
64	"Yokai Cave Monk"; Transliteration: "Yōkai Anagura-nyūdō" (Japanese: 妖怪穴ぐら入道)	Yugo Serikawa	Yukiyoshi Ohashi	Jōji Yanase	Tsutomu Fujita	January 31, 1987
65	"Yokai Hundred Eyes Goes to Hell"; Transliteration: "Yōkai Hyakume - Jigoku Nagashi" (Japanese: 妖怪百目・地獄流し)	Akinori Ōrai	Junki Takegami	Yasuhiro Yamaguchi	Hiroshi Washizaki	February 7, 1987
66	"Korean Yokai No Face"; Transliteration: "Kankoku Yōkai Nupperabō" (Japanese: 韓国妖怪ぬっぺらぼう)	Akio Yamadera	Yukiyoshi Ohashi	Akira Shimizu	Tsutomu Fujita	February 14, 1987
67	"The Great Jungle Sea Monster"; Transliteration: "Mitsurin no Dai Kaijū" (Japanese: 密林の大海獣)	Osamu Kasai	Hiroyuki Hoshiyama	Yoshinobu Inano	Hiroshi Washizaki	February 21, 1987
68	"The Great Sea Monster's Angry Counterattack"; Transliteration: "Dai Kaijū Ikari no Gyakushū" (Japanese: 大海獣怒りの逆襲)	Osamu Kasai	Hiroyuki Hoshiyama	Satoru Iriyoshi	Hiroshi Washizaki	February 28, 1987
69	"Yokai Matasaburo of the Wind"; Transliteration: "Yōkai Kaze no Matasaburō" (Japanese: 妖怪風の又三郎)	Masayuki Akehi	Junki Takegami	Shigetaka Kiyoyama	Fumihiro Uchikawa	March 7, 1987
70	"Mirror Hell! Yokai Ungaikyo"; Transliteration: "Kagami Jigoku! Yōkai Ungaikyō" (Japanese: 鏡地獄!妖怪うんがい鏡)	Yugo Serikawa	Junki Takegami	Katsuji Matsumoto	Tsutomu Fujita	March 14, 1987
71	"Gashadokuro of Yokai Flower Forest"; Transliteration: "Yōka no Mori no Gashadokuro" (Japanese: 妖花の森のがしゃどくろ)	Minoru Okazaki	Yukiyoshi Ohashi	Kahoru Hirata	Hiroshi Washizaki	March 21, 1987
72	"Heh-heh-Hair! The Great Yokai Hair-sama"; Transliteration: "Ke - Ke -Ke! Yōkai Dai Kami-sama" (Japanese: ケ・け・毛!妖怪大髪様)	Masahisa Ishida	Hiroyuki Hoshiyama	Tomoyuki Matsumoto	Tsutomu Fujita	March 28, 1987
73	"Shisa Appears!! The Great Battle in Okinawa"; Transliteration: "Shiisā Tōjō!! Okinawa Dai Kessen" (Japanese: シーサー登場!!沖縄大決戦)	Akinori Ōrai	Junki Takegami	Yasuhiro Yamaguchi	Hiroshi Washizaki	April 4, 1987
74	"Yokai 10,000 Year Old Bamboo"; Transliteration: "Yōkai Mannendake" (Japanese: 妖怪万年竹)	Takeshi Shirato	Hiroyuki Hoshiyama	Akira Shimizu	Tsutomu Fujita	April 11, 1987
75	"Yokai Adzuki Allied Forces"; Transliteration: "Yōkai Azuki Rengōgun" (Japanese: 妖怪小豆連合軍)	Hiroki Shibata	Yukiyoshi Ohashi	Yoshinobu Inano	Hiroshi Washizaki	April 18, 1987
76	"The Man Eating Island and the Sea Priest"; Transliteration: "Hitokui-jima to Umioshō" (Japanese: 人喰い島と海和尚)	Yugo Serikawa	Junki Takegami	Jōji Yanase	Kunio Kaneshima	April 25, 1987
77	"Yokai Eyes on Hand and the Hell Child"; Transliteration: "Yōkai Tenome to Jigoku no Gaki" (Japanese: 妖怪手の目と地獄の餓鬼)	Masayuki Akehi	Hiroyuki Hoshiyama	Shigetaka Kiyoyama	Hiroshi Washizaki	May 2, 1987
78	"Mammoth Flower and Mountain Man"; Transliteration: "Manmosu Furawā to Yama-otoko" (Japanese: マンモスフラワーと山男)	Osamu Kasai	Junki Takegami	Shigetaka Kiyoyama	Hidenobu Hata	May 16, 1987
79	"Yokai Eight Headed Snake"; Transliteration: "Yōkai Yamata-no-orochi" (Japanese: 妖怪やまたのおろち)	Masahisa Ishida	Yukiyoshi Ohashi	Tomoyuki Matsumoto	Tsutomu Fujita	May 23, 1987
80	"Yokai Granny Fire Snuff's Pro Wrestling Hell"; Transliteration: "Yōkai Fukikeshi-baba Puroresu Jigoku" (Japanese: 妖怪吹消婆プロレス地獄)	Akinori Ōrai	Junki Takegami	Satoru Iriyoshi	Hiroshi Washizaki	May 30, 1987
81	"Yokai Combo Long Arm Long Leg"; Transliteration: "Konbi Yōkai Tenaga-Ashinaga" (Japanese: コンビ妖怪手長足長)	Minoru Okazaki	Hiroyuki Hoshiyama	Kahoru Hirata	Kunio Kaneshima	June 6, 1987
82	"Yokai Skewer Monk"; Transliteration: "Yōkai Kushizashi-nyūdō" (Japanese: 妖怪串刺し入道)	Yugo Serikawa	Yukiyoshi Ohashi	Yoshinobu Inano	Hiroshi Washizaki	June 13, 1987
83	"The Legend of the Rain God Yumuchaac"; Transliteration: "Ujin Yumuchakku Densetsu" (Japanese: 雨神ユムチャック伝説)	Hiroki Shibata	Junki Takegami	Katsuji Matsumoto	Tsutomu Fujita	June 20, 1987
84	"All Around Hell! The Yokai Marathon"; Transliteration: "Jigoku Isshū!! Yōkai Marason" (Japanese: 地獄一周!!妖怪マラソン)	Takeshi Shirato	Hiroyuki Hoshiyama	Akira Shimizu	Hiroshi Washizaki	June 27, 1987
85	"The Kappa Family and Takuro-bi"; Transliteration: "Kappa Ichizoku to Takurō-bi" (Japanese: 河童一族とたくろう火)	Masahisa Ishida	Yukiyoshi Ohashi	Tomoyuki Matsumoto	Tsutomu Fujita	July 4, 1987
86	"Yokai Censer's Dream Demon Army"; Transliteration: "Yōkai Kōro Akumu no Gundam" (Japanese: 妖怪香炉悪夢の軍団)	Osamu Kasai	Junki Takegami	Shigetaka Kiyoyama	Hiroshi Washizaki	July 11, 1987
87	"Parasitic Yokai Penanggalan"; Transliteration: "Kisei Yōkai Penangaran" (Japanese: 寄生妖怪ペナンガラン)	Akinori Ōrai	Hiroyuki Hoshiyama	Jōji Yanase	Tsutomu Fujita	July 25, 1987
88	"The Mysterious Yokai Dog Taro"; Transliteration: "Fushigi na Yōken Tarō" (Japanese: 不思議な妖犬タロー)	Yugo Serikawa	Yukiyoshi Ohashi	Tomoyuki Matsumoto	Hiroshi Washizaki	August 1, 1987
89	"Tree Child and Yokai Mountain Tengu"; Transliteration: "Kinoko to Yōkai Yama-tengū" (Japanese: 木の子と妖怪山天狗)	Minoru Okazaki	Junki Takegami	Kahoru Hirata	Sukeyuki Tanaka	August 15, 1987
90	"The Blue Tears of the Fairy Nix"; Transliteration: "Yōsei Nikusu no Aoi Namida" (Japanese: 妖精ニクスの青い涙)	Hiroki Shibata	Hiroyuki Hoshiyama & Ken'ichi Kanemaki	Yoshinobu Inano	Hiroshi Washizaki	August 22, 1987
91	"Yokai Hunter Family Hi"; Transliteration: "Yōkai Hantā Hi Ichizoku" (Japanese: 妖怪ハンターヒ一族)	Osamu Kasai	Junki Takegami	Satoru Iriyoshi	Masato Itō	August 29, 1987
92	"The Rattling of Cannibal House and Yokai House"; Transliteration: "Hitokui-ka to Yōkai-ka Nari" (Japanese: 人喰い家と妖怪家鳴)	Yugo Serikawa	Yukiyoshi Ohashi	Tomoyuki Matsumoto	Hiroshi Washizaki	September 26, 1987
93	"Evolved Yokai Otter"; Transliteration: "Shinka Yōkai Kabuso" (Japanese: 進化妖怪かぶそ)	Hiroki Shibata	Junki Takegami	Yasuhiro Yamaguchi	Tsutomu Fujita	October 3, 1987
94	"Red Hot Yokai Removable Neck"; Transliteration: "Kōnetsu Yōkai Nuke-kubi" (Japanese: 高熱妖怪ぬけ首)	Takeshi Shirato	Hiroyuki Hoshiyama	Akira Shimizu	Motoyuki Tanaka	October 10, 1987
95	"The Laughing Yokai Henra-hera-hera"; Transliteration: "Warai Yōkai Henra-hera-hera" (Japanese: 笑い妖怪ヘンラヘラヘラ)	Tetsuo Imazawa	Yukiyoshi Ohashi	Kahoru Hirata	Hiroshi Washizaki	October 17, 1987
96	"Blood Battle!! Yokai Vampire Army"; Transliteration: "Kessen!! Yōkai Kyūketsu Gundan" (Japanese: 血戦!!妖怪吸血軍団)	Yugo Serikawa	Junki Takegami	Yoshinobu Inano	Motoyuki Tanaka	October 24, 1987
97	"Married Yokai!? Plate Counter"; Transliteration: "Fūfu Yōkai!? Sarakazoe" (Japanese: 夫婦妖怪!?皿数え)	Masahisa Ishida	Hiroyuki Hoshiyama	Tomoyuki Matsumoto	Hiroshi Washizaki	October 31, 1987
98	"Tsunami Yokai Fierce Ghost Hassan"; Transliteration: "Tsunami Yōkai Mōrei-Hassan" (Japanese: 津波妖怪猛霊はっさん)	Akio Yamadera	Yukiyoshi Ohashi	Kōichi Takata	Kenji Matsumoto	November 7, 1987
99	"Footwear Yokai Ghoul Zōri"; Transliteration: "Hakimono Yōkai Bakezōri" (Japanese: はきもの妖怪化けぞうり)	Masahisa Ishida	Hiroyuki Hoshiyama	Tomoyuki Matsumoto	Hiroshi Washizaki	November 14, 1987
100	"Devil Miko's Kitaro Destruction Plan"; Transliteration: "Oni Miko no Kitarō Massatsu Sakusen" (Japanese: 鬼巫女の鬼太郎抹殺作戦)	Tetsuo Imazawa	Junki Takegami	Kahoru Hirata	Kunio Kaneshima	November 21, 1987
101	"Yokai Detective Story, The Cat Riot"; Transliteration: "Yōkai Torimonochō Neko Sōdō" (Japanese: 妖怪捕物帖猫騒動)	Masayuki Akehi	Hiroyuki Hoshiyama	Yasuhiro Yamaguchi	Motoyuki Tanaka	December 12, 1987
102	"Tomboy Witch Jiniya"; Transliteration: "Otenba Majō Jiniyā" (Japanese: おてんば魔女ジニヤー)	Osamu Kasai	Yukiyoshi Ohashi	Tomoyuki Matsumoto	Yūji Ikeda	December 19, 1987
103	"True Love: Nurikabe and Face Powder Girl"; Transliteration: "Junai Nurikabe to Oshiroi-musume" (Japanese: 純愛ぬりかべとおしろい娘)	Osamu Kasai	Junki Takegami	Hiromi Niioka	Tsutomu Fujita	December 26, 1987
104	"The Mysterious Yokai Hunter Tour"; Transliteration: "Nazo no Yōkai Gari Tsuā" (Japanese: 謎の妖怪狩りツアー)	Yugo Serikawa	Hiroyuki Hoshiyama	Tomoyuki Matsumoto	Yûko Kobayashi	January 9, 1988
105	"Yokai Menko Tengu"; Transliteration: "Yōkai Menko Tengū" (Japanese: 妖怪めんこ天狗)	Takeshi Shirato	Hiroyuki Hoshiyama	Kōichi Takata	Tomoko Yoshida	January 16, 1988
106	"Tofu Kid and Mountain God"; Transliteration: "Tōfu-kozō to Yamagami" (Japanese: とうふ小僧と山神)	Hiroki Shibata	Yukiyoshi Ohashi	Tomoyuki Matsumoto	Yûko Kobayashi	January 23, 1988
107	"Smoke Yokai Enra-enra"; Transliteration: "Kemuri Yōkai Enra-enra" (Japanese: ケムリ妖怪えんらえんら)	Minoru Okazaki	Junki Takegami	Yasunori Miyazawa	Tomoko Yoshida	January 30, 1988
108	"Kitaro Family Forever"; Transliteration: "Kitarō Famirii wa Towa ni" (Japanese: 鬼太郎ファミリーは永遠に)	Osamu Kasai	Hiroyuki Hoshiyama	Hiromi Niioka	Yûko Kobayashi	February 6, 1988
Jigoku-hen
109	"Journey to Hell in Search of Mother"; Transliteration: "Haha wo Motomete Jigoku-tabi" (Japanese: 母を求めて地獄旅)	Hiroki Shibata	Junki Takegami	Tomoyuki Matsumoto	Tomoko Yoshida	February 8, 1988
110	"Bloody Battle on the Sanzu River"; Transliteration: "Kessen Sanzu no Kawa" (Japanese: 血戦三途の川)	Osamu Kasai	Junki Takegami	Satoru Iriyoshi	Kunio Kaneshima & Takeshi Waki	February 15, 1988
111	"Kitaro vs the Prince of Hell"; Transliteration: "Kitarō VS Jigoku-Dōji" (Japanese: 鬼太郎VS地獄童子)	Minoru Okazaki	Junki Takegami	Yasunori Miyazawa	Tsutomu Fujita	February 22, 1988
112	"Trap of the Two Great Yokai"; Transliteration: "Nidai Yōkai no Wana" (Japanese: 二大妖怪の罠)	Takeshi Shirato	Yukiyoshi Ohashi	Kōichi Takata	Kunio Kaneshima	February 29, 1988
113	"Execution Strategy of the Hell Warriors!!"; Transliteration: "Jigoku Musha no Shokei Sakusen!!" (Japanese: 地獄武者の 処刑作戦!!)	Yugo Serikawa	Junki Takegami	Tomoyuki Matsumoto	Toshiaki Marumori	March 7, 1988
114	"Nururibo, the Blood Lake Yokai"; Transliteration: "Chinoike Yōkai Nururibō" (Japanese: 血の池妖怪 ヌルリ坊)	Hiroki Shibata	Junki Takegami	Takashi Saijō	Motoyuki Tanaka	March 14, 1988
115	"Kitaro's Final Encounter!!"; Transliteration: "Kitarō Saigō no Deai!!" (Japanese: 鬼太郎 最後の出会い!!)	Osamu Kasai	Junki Takegami	Satoru Iriyoshi & Hiromi Niioka	Kunio Kaneshima	March 21, 1988

== Blu-ray SD release ==
=== Region A (Japan) ===
Name	Date	Discs	Episodes
Volume 1	July 25, 2018	2	1–59
Volume 2	August 24, 2019	2	60–108
