= Zori =

Flat Japanese sandals similar to flip-flops

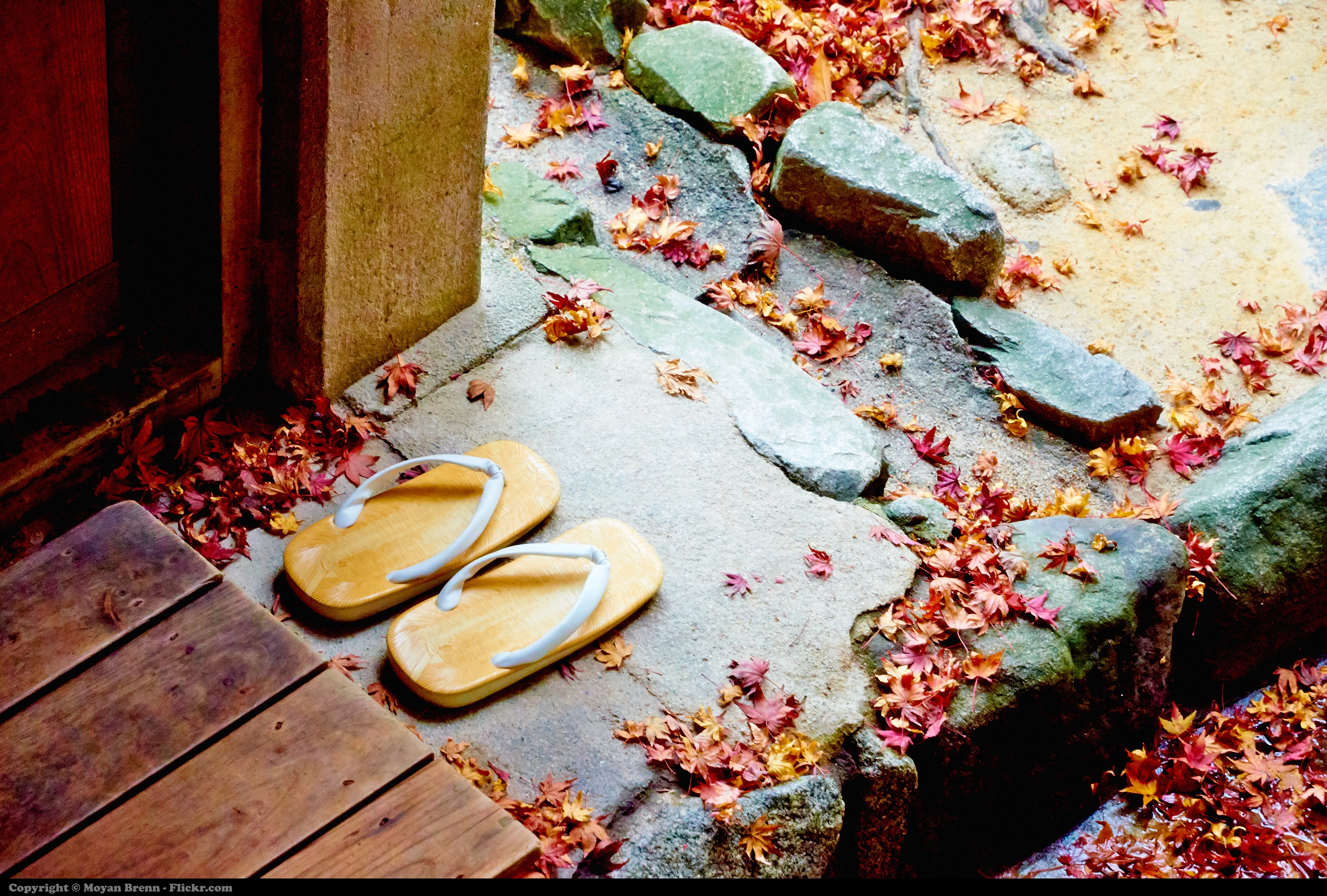
- Setta, a type of zori
- Type: Japanese sandal
- Material: rice straw, cloth, lacquered wood, leather, rubber or synthetic materials
- Place of origin: Japan

Zori (/ˈzɔːri/), also rendered as zōri (Japanese: 草履(ぞうり), Japanese pronunciation: [d͡zo̞ːɾʲi]), are thonged Japanese sandals made of rice straw, cloth, lacquered wood, leather, rubber, or—most commonly and informally—synthetic materials. They are a slip-on descendant of the tied-on waraji sandal.

Similar in form, modern flip-flops became popular in the United States, Australia and New Zealand when soldiers returning from World War II brought Japanese zori with them.

== Use ==
Like many Japanese sandals, zori are easily slipped on and off, (Note: See waraji for similar, tie-on sandals.) which is important in Japan, where shoes are removed and put back on when entering and leaving a house, and where tying shoelaces would be impractical when wearing traditional clothing.

The traditional forms of zori are seen when worn with other traditional clothing. Modern forms are fairly common, however, with casual Western wear, especially in summer. While geta are now mostly worn with the informal yukata, traditional zori are often worn with the more formal kimono.

In rain, zori may be worn with toe covers (shigure zori).

== Materials ==
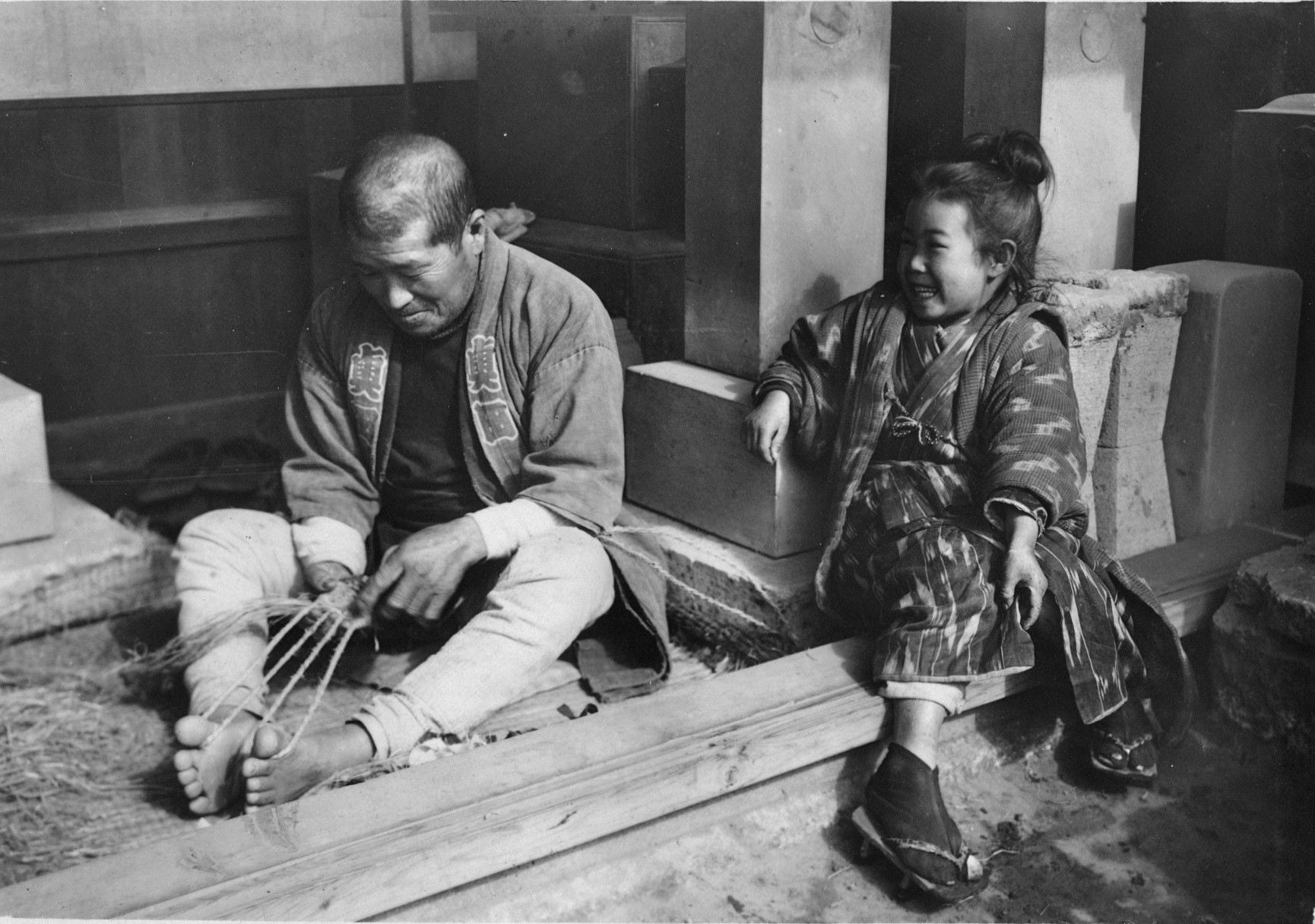
Zori were traditionally made at home, as were waraji. Note twine warp, held between hands and toes, and loose-fiber weft, to his right.

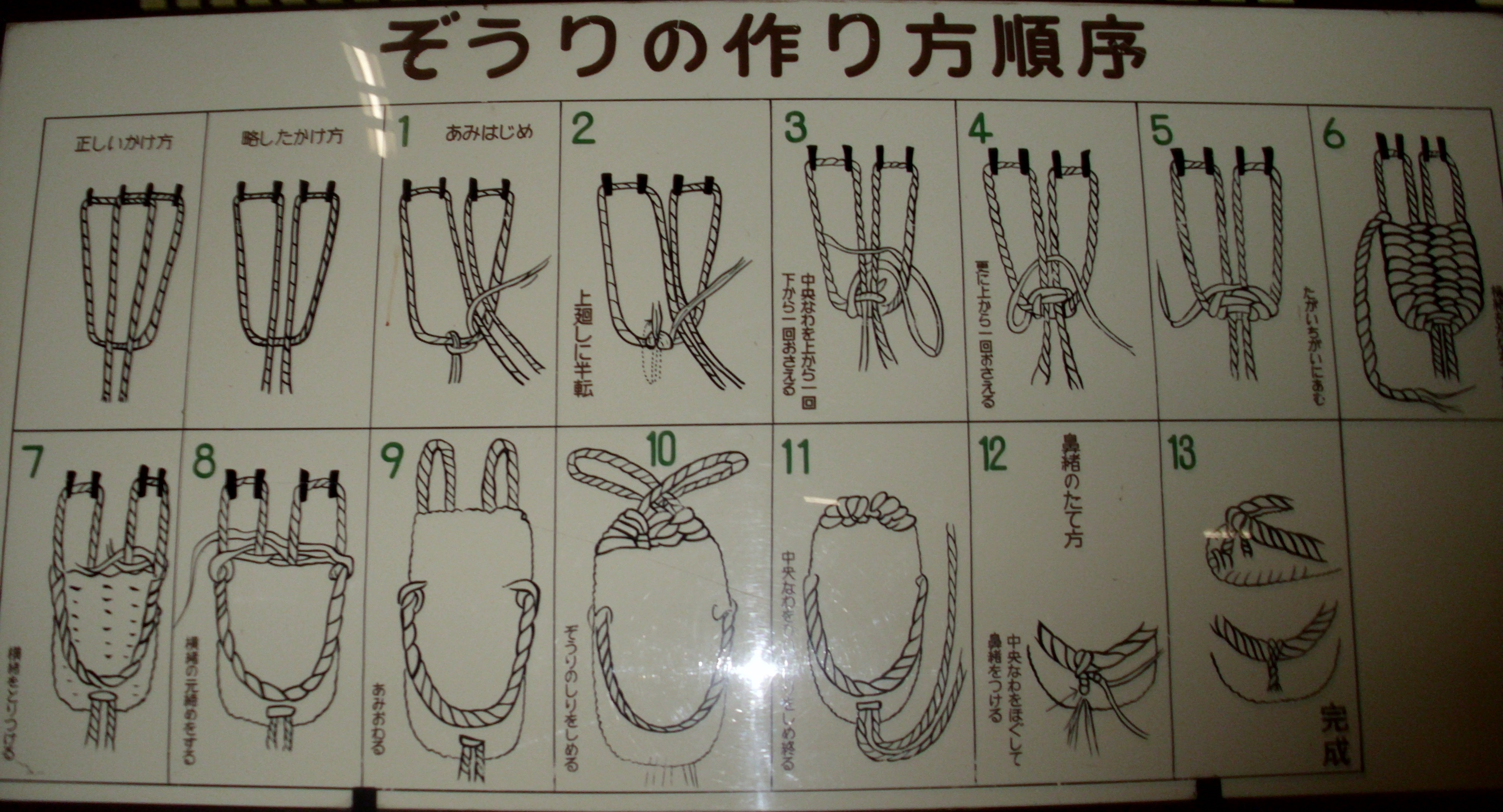
Pictorial instructions on how to weave wara-zōri or waraji in Hida Minzoku Mura Folk Village; woven footwear is uncommonly produced, especially for practical necessity, in Japan in the present day.

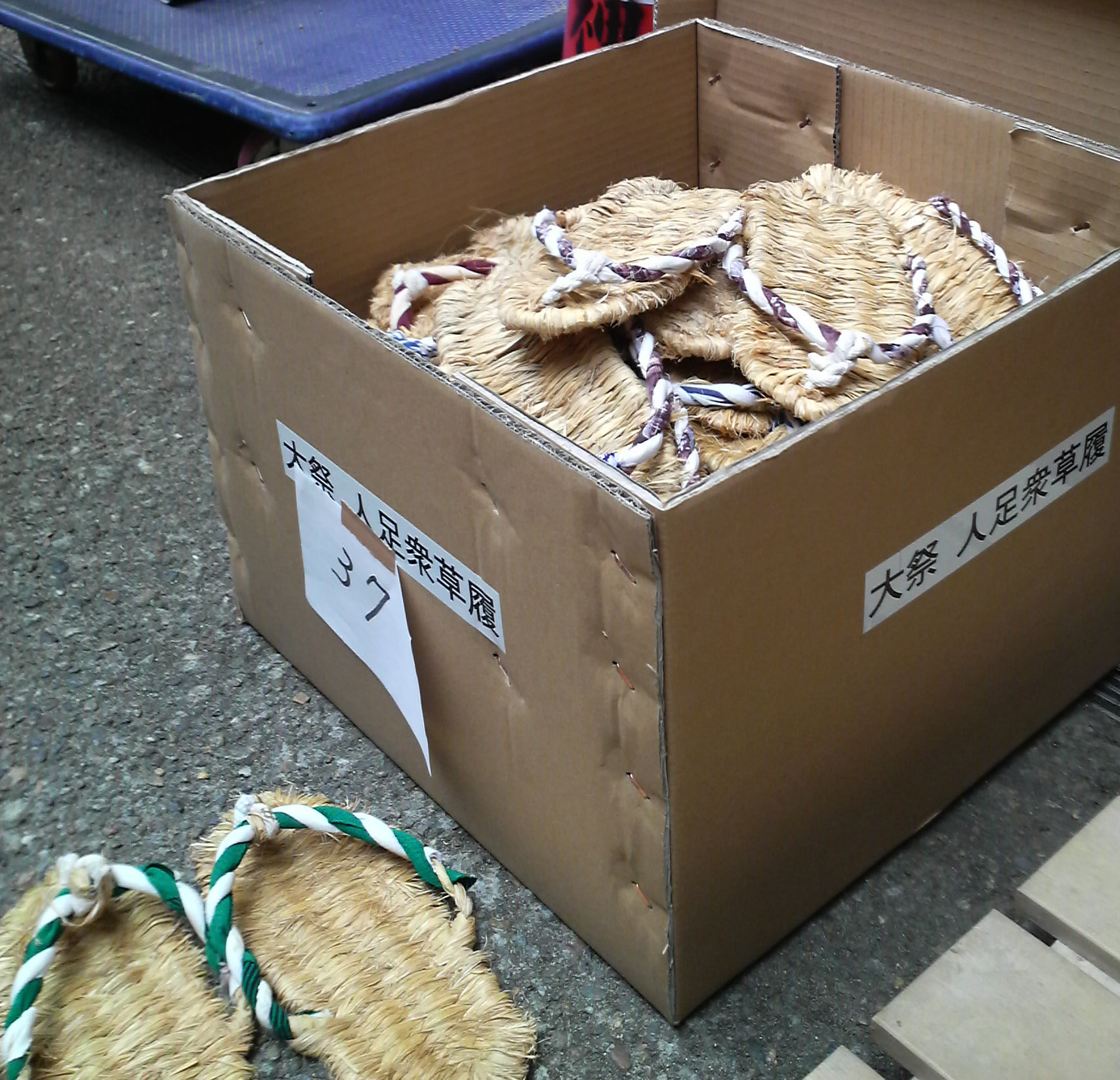
Similar roughly-woven festival zori, but with the straps wrapped in fabric before being twisted together

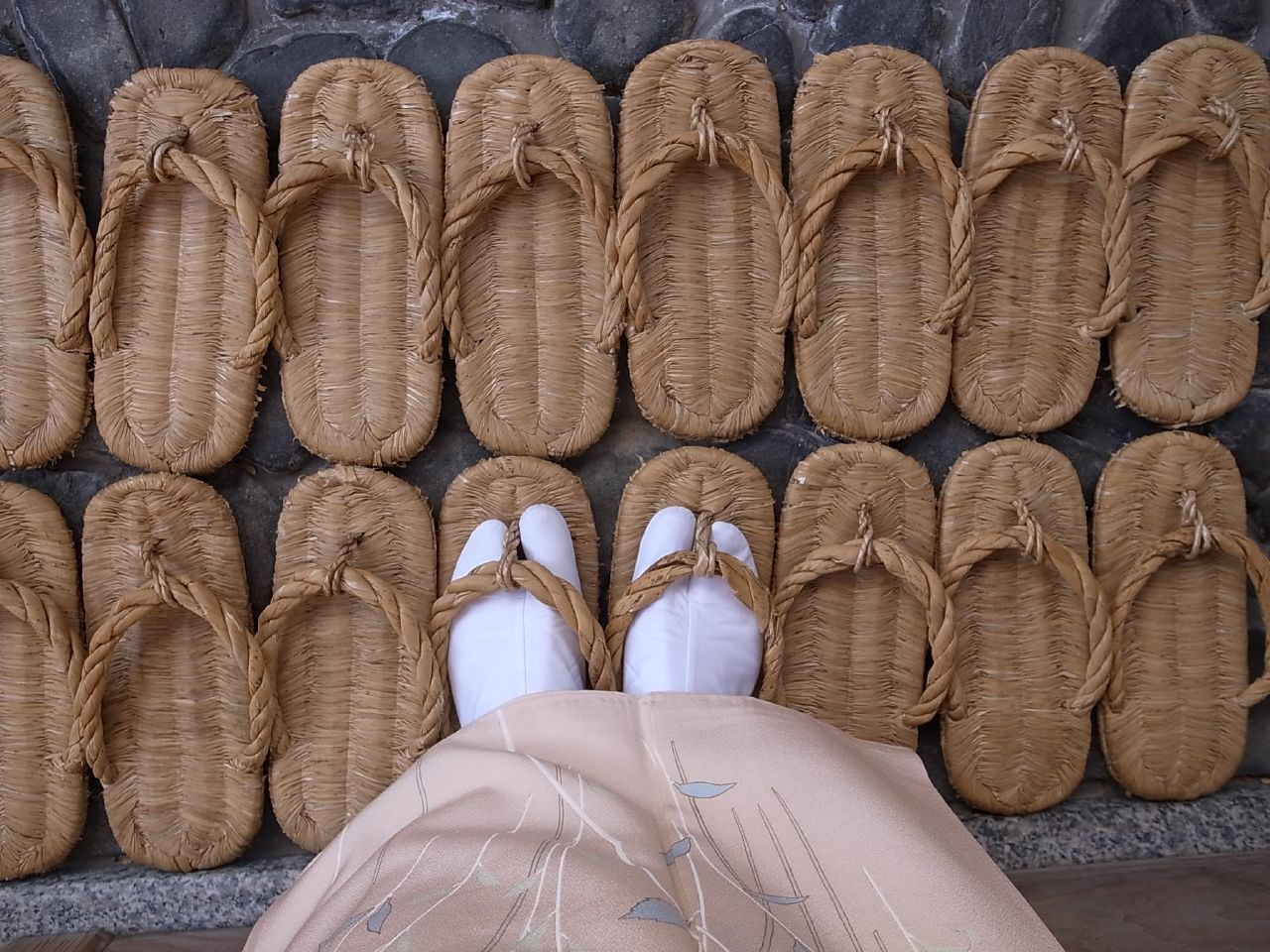
More finely-woven zori (the thong is also further back). Sewn-on outsoles are just visible at the edges.

The zori originated as a slip-on form of the tie-on waraji. In the Edo period (1603-1867), the production of zori became professionalized, and a variety of fancy types of zori emerged, using fancier materials. While zori were still commonly woven of rice straw (wara-zōri 藁 草履(わら ぞうり), literally "straw zori"), rushes of various kinds and bamboo sheath were also used. If they were made of something less cheap than rice straw, an extra outsole was often sewn on. This could be made of coiled hemp rope (asaura-zōri), wisteria stems, (fujiura-zōri), or wood in lateral strips (zōri-geta or itatsuke-zōri). Leather soles were used on setta. In modern times, polyurethane and cork are used as outsoles.

Zori also have a variety of upper surfaces. Zori with a woven wicker covering are referred to as tatami omote (Note: Though tatami are not woven with the sheaths of the Phyllostachys bambusoides plant, the term "tatami" is used generally in this instance to refer to a woven plant-origin covering - "tatami omote" roughly translating as "woven covering".) If it is woven of rice straw (as above), they are wara-zōri. If they are woven on the same four-warp pattern, but using a weft of bamboo sheath (peelings of bamboo culms), they are takegawa (たけがわ, 竹皮) zori, literally bamboo-skin zori. The topsole may also be woven of common rush (igusa). This is the material used for most tatami mats, and igusa-zōri are also woven on the same many-warp pattern as tatami.

Raffia, rattan, and paper strips (treated and twisted to resemble rush) are also used in topsoles. Some soles are skiamorphic moldings that look like woven topsoles. Topsoles might also be made of cloth, leather, PVC cloth, or EVA foam. Soles made entirely of waterproof (usually synthetic) materials are called 雨底 (amezoko) zori, literally rain-soled zori. Elastomer zori are called ゴム草履 (gomu-zōri).

Wrapping straw straps with cloth makes the zori into fuku-zōri (cloth zori, 服草履(ふくぞうり)) Modern zori are usually made with the straps as a separate piece, not woven at the same time as the sole.

=== Hanao ===
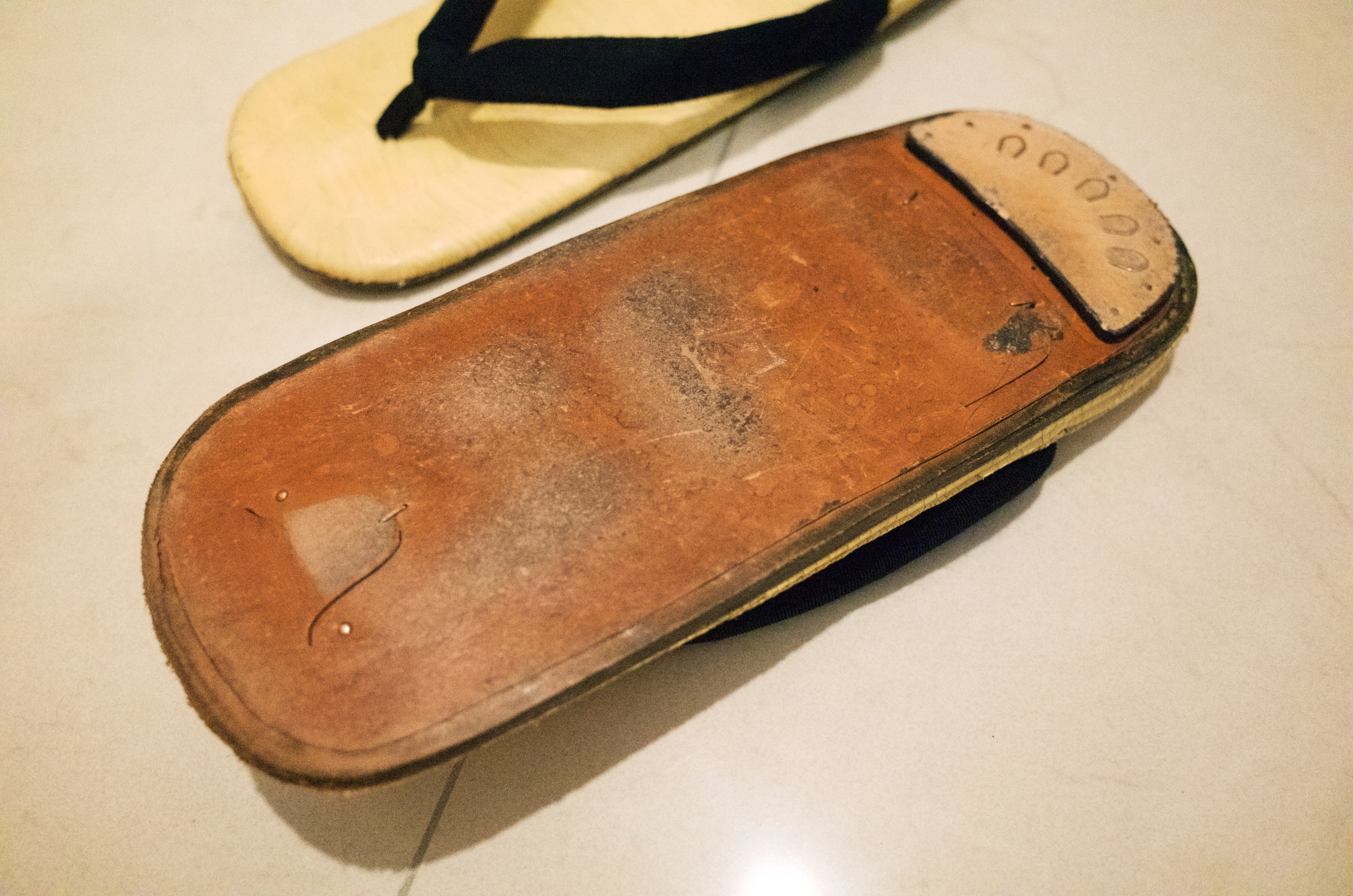
Setta, leather-soled zori, with flaps for replacing hanao (rear flap is inconspicuous)

The hanao are the straps holding the sole to the foot; the part that should fit loosely between the toes is the maetsubo (前壺), and the side-straps are the yoko-o (横緒). Hanao, like zori soles, are traditionally symmetrical, with no difference between left and right, though some designs diverge from this.

The hanao of informal zori can be made of a velour-like material, as is often the case for igusa zori. The hanao of more formal colored vinyl zori are either vinyl or fabric straps. The fabric is often either the fabric used for the shoe, or chirimen (a type of Japanese crepe, of silk or rayon), or cotton, often with a different, softer fabric underneath. Men's zori may also feature leather or leather imitation hanao.

Traditionally, hanao are adjusted to the wearer, being tied through three holes by strings attached to the straps. Hanao can wear and stretch easily; in such instances, the hanao can be adjusted or replaced through small flaps in the soles, which conceal the knots that hold them in place. In other instances, however, the hanao can be entirely inaccessible, requiring the glued sole to be split open, or entire shoe to be replaced.

== Varieties and formalities ==
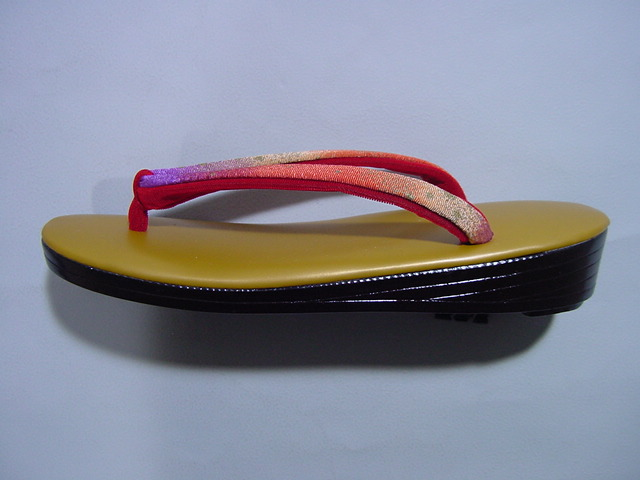
Side view of a semi-formal vinyl zori. Two-fabric hanao, softer beneath.

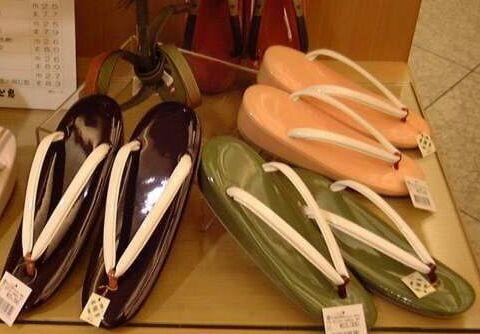
Modern formal vinyl women's zori

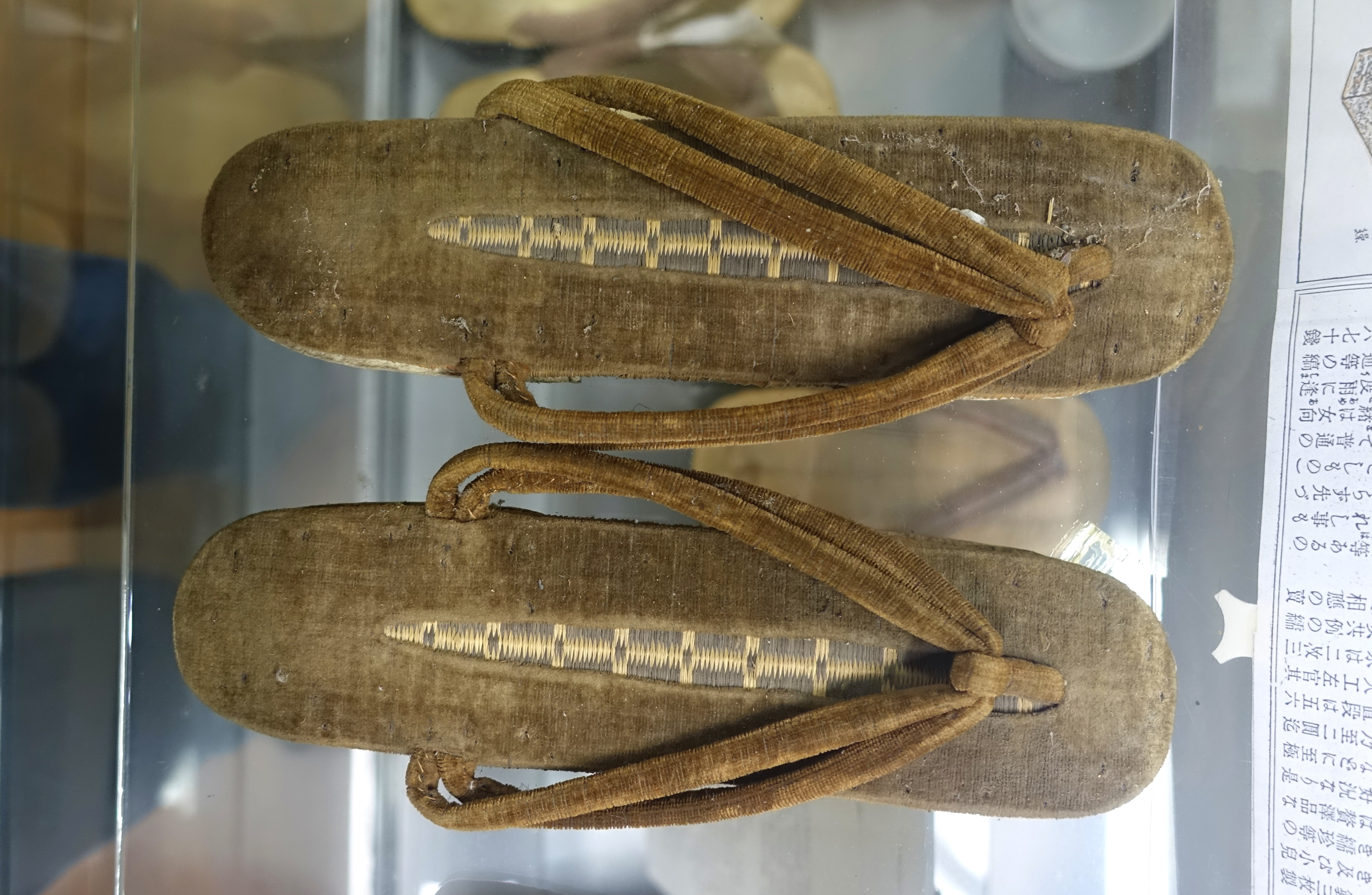
Historic cloth-covered zori

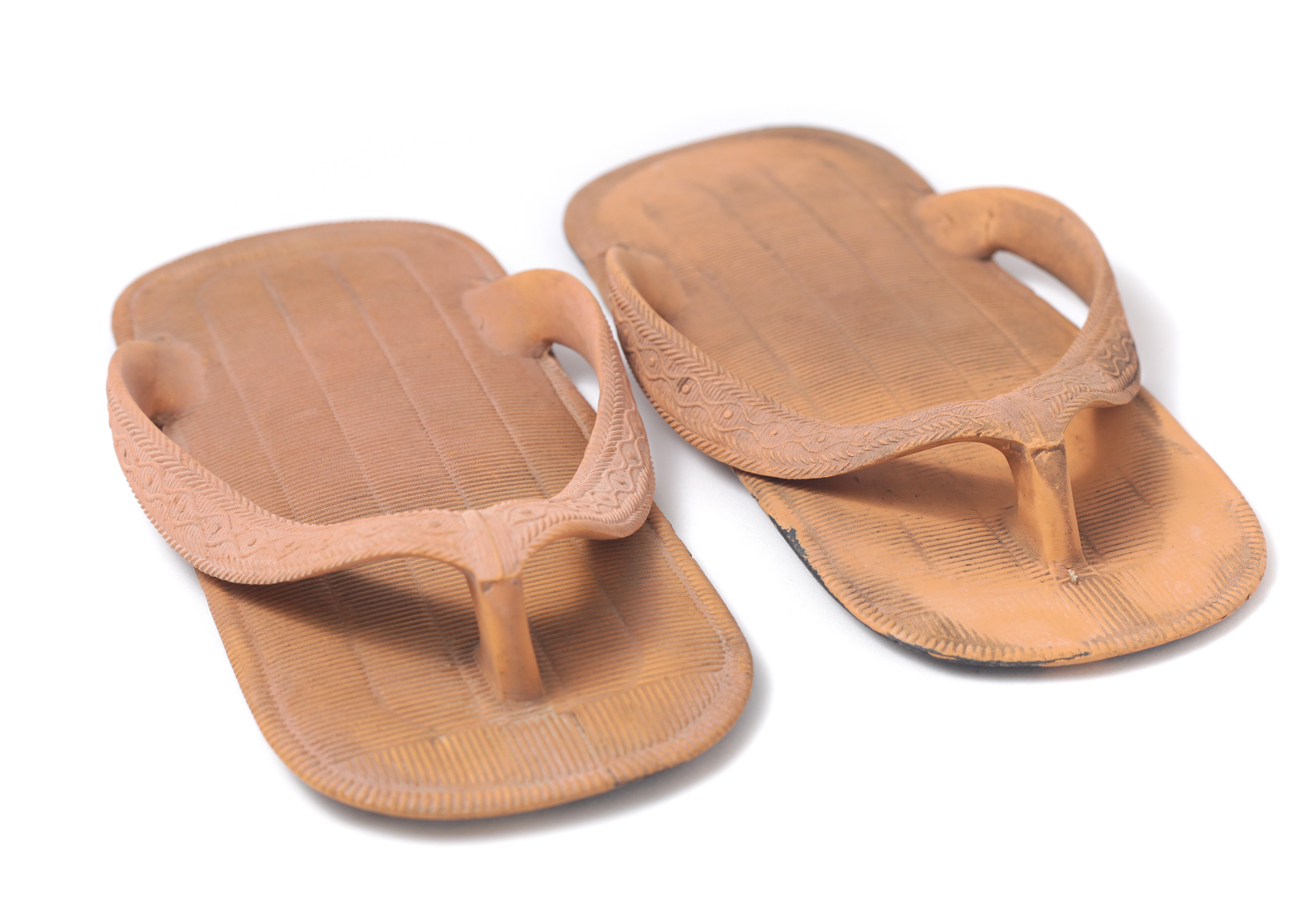
Rubber gomu zori, frequently used in bathrooms, and left at the bathroom door

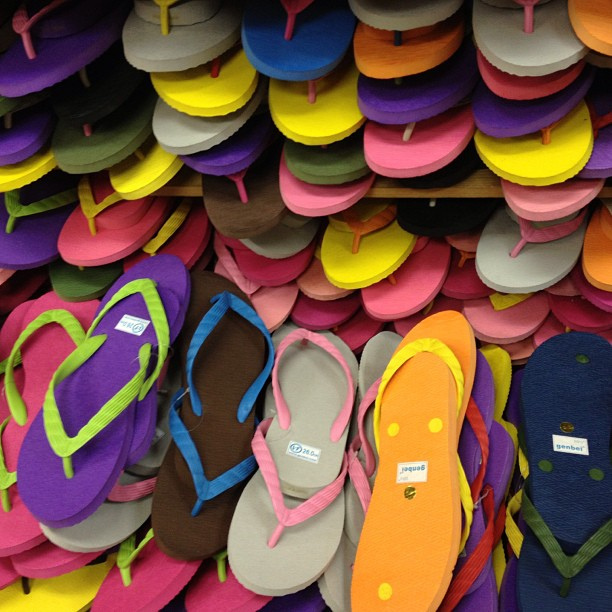
EVA flip-flops for sale in Kanagawa Prefecture; note asymmetry

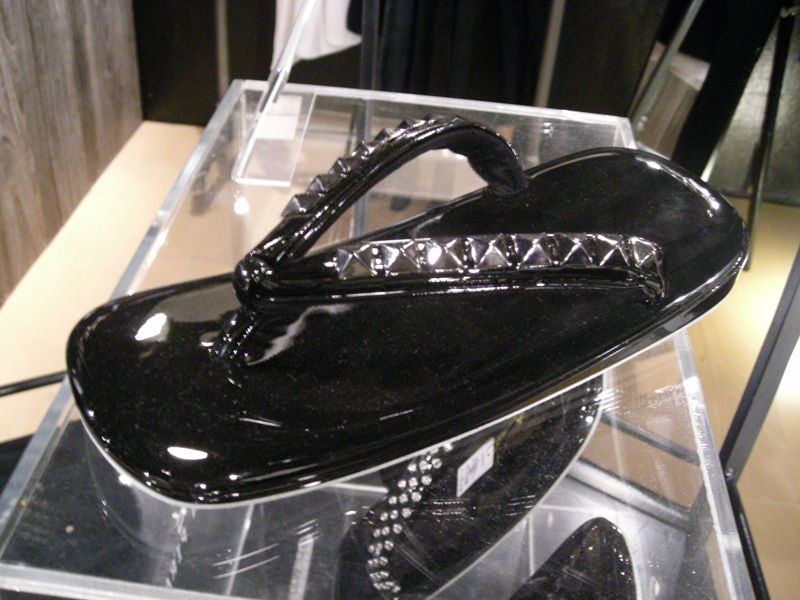
Glossy vinyl zori

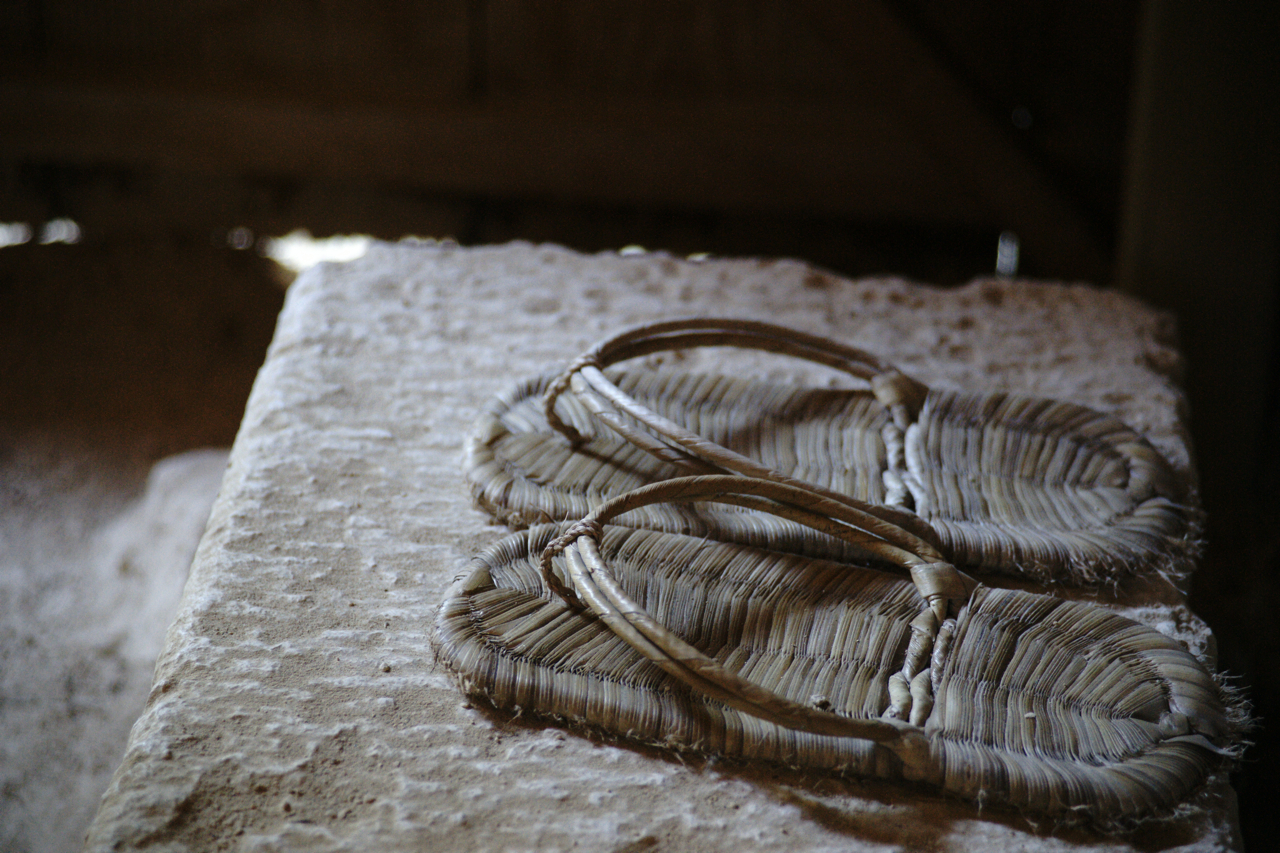
Tatami zori with a stitched-on outsole. These seem to be made of paper "rush".

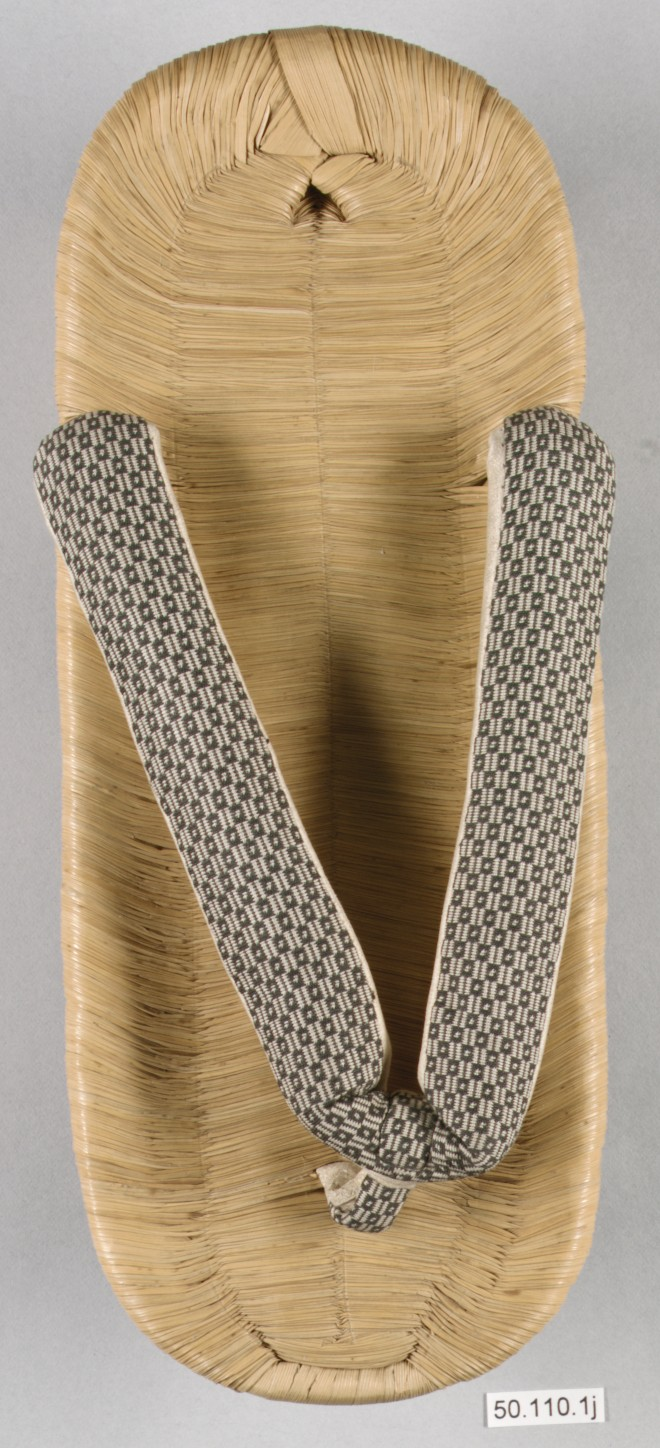
1800s setta; top surface woven

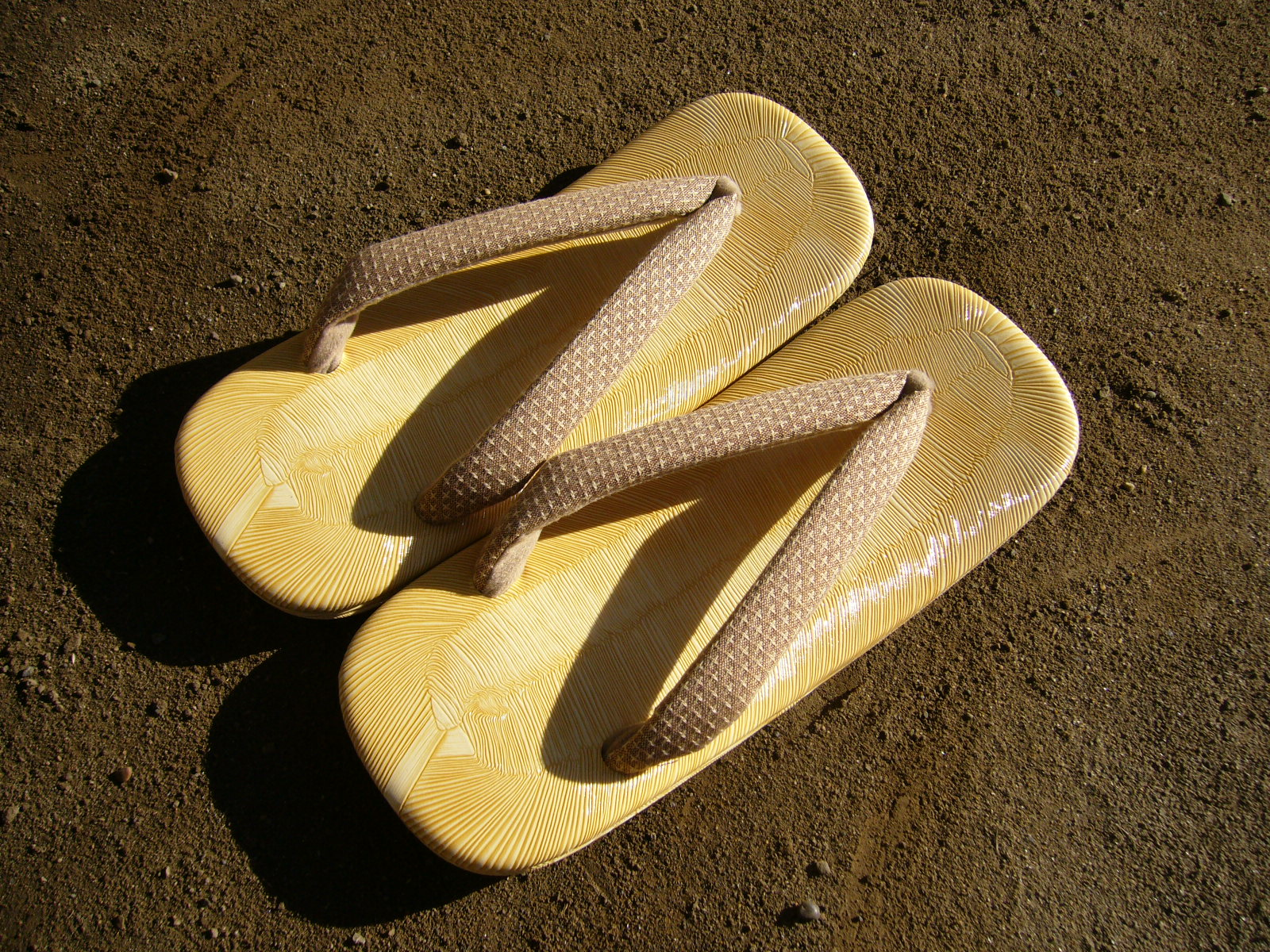
Setta; the top surface is a moulded imitation of the surface in the previous image.

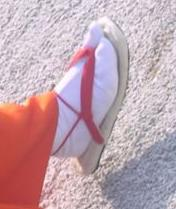
Zori being worn, with an extra tie around the ankle, hitched around each strap

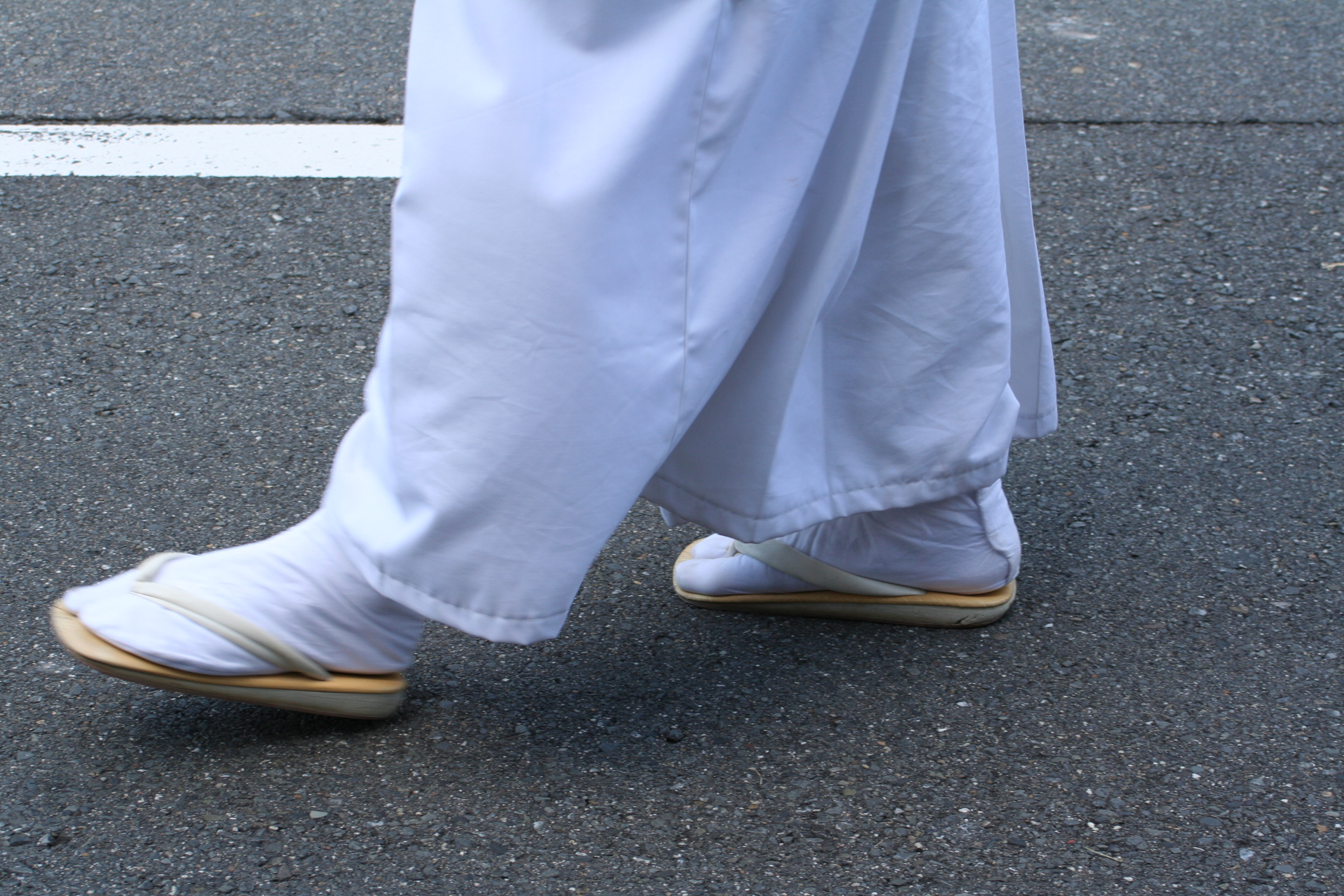
Zori being worn

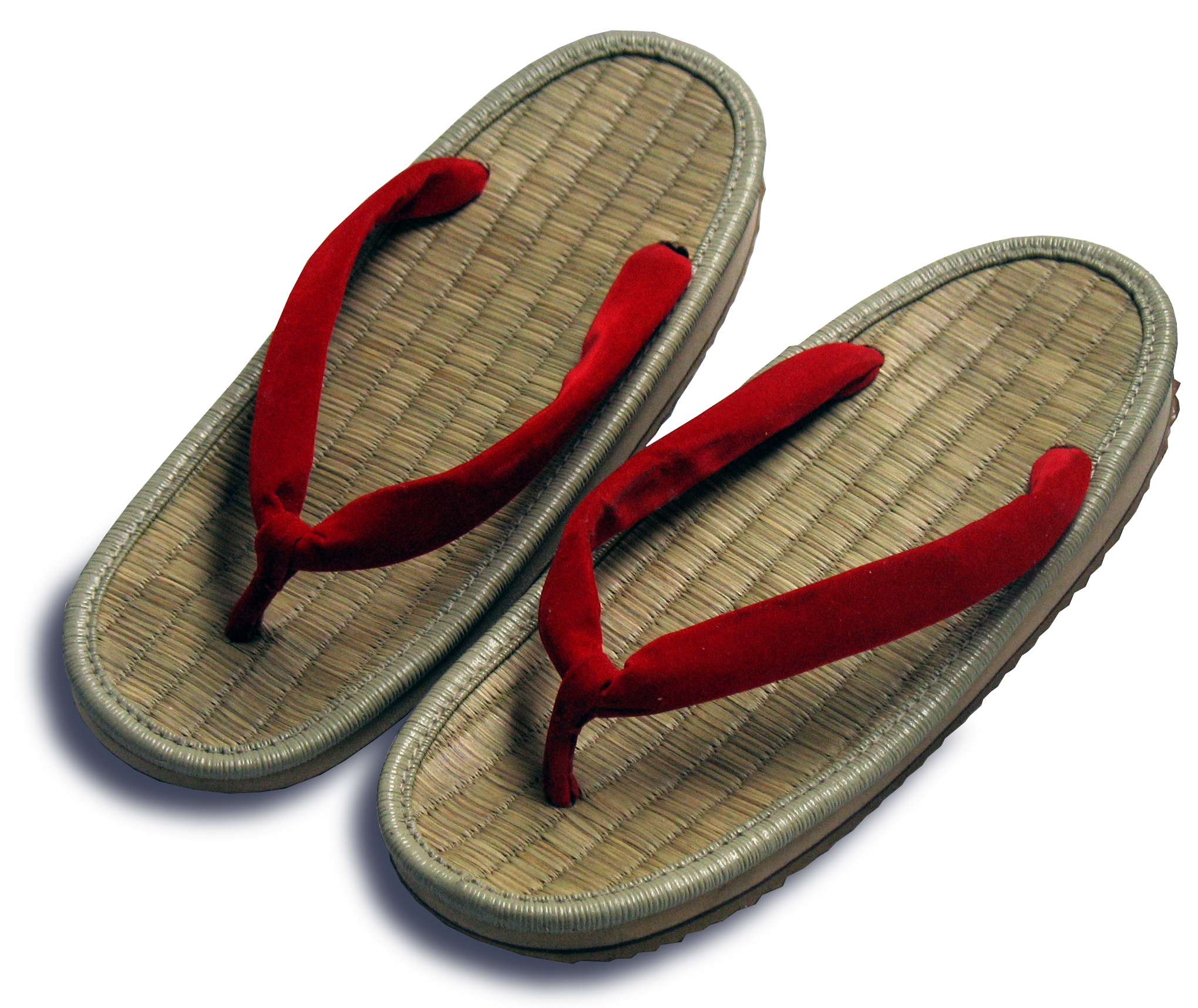
Casual igusa zori, with many-warp top surface and velour hanao

Both the gender of the wearer and the formality of the occasion affects the choice of zori. Regardless of variety, zori are almost always worn with tabi socks.

Women's zori are seldom flat, save for igusa zori. The soles come in different thicknesses and angles, and are typically covered by vinyl or fabric, though some modern varieties feature a hard black plastic sole with a non-slip base. In contrast, men's zori almost always feature a flat sole.

Zori with a woven wicker covering are referred to as tatami omote. (Note: Though tatami are not woven with the sheaths of the Phyllostachys bambusoides plant, the term "tatami" is used generally in this instance to refer to a woven plant-origin covering - "tatami omote" roughly translating as "woven covering".) Takagawa zori are generally considered to be relatively formal zori, even if the covering is a vinyl imitation of a woven bamboo-sheath cover. Though most zori with a tatami omote cover are considered to be menswear—known as setta—traditional women's footwear with a tatami omote cover also exist, though these are generally confined to the okobo variety of geta. In contrast, igusa zori are more modern, and are not worn with kimono, but are considered working wear or are sometimes matched with casual Western or Japanese clothing. These zori more closely resemble a flat sandal with a woven base.

Setta were historically mostly takegawa setta, but as of 2002, they were often igusa setta; they were also increasingly likely to have coloured and patterned straps.

Vinyl or plastic zori are next in formality. They are worn with formal clothing such as a semi-formal kimono. The most formal variety of zori are generally worn by women; they are brocade covered zori that are used with the most formal of kimono, such as wedding and funeral wear.

The hanao, or thongs, may be white or black, depending on the occasion; white hanao are worn with formal zori, with black hanao considered to be informal. They may also complement the colour of the garment. Black, white, and red hanao are traditional and commonly mass-produced, but colourful hanao with a variety of patterns, sometimes chosen separately from the zori, are also popular.

== See also ==
- List of shoe styles
- Bakezōri, a zori that comes to life when possessed by a kami
- Geta, traditional Japanese wooden sandals
- Jika-tabi, traditional Japanese split-toed boots
- Okobo, traditional Japanese wooden clogs
- Tabi, traditional Japanese split-toed socks
- Waraji, a simpler form of traditional Japanese sandal
