= Bakezōri =

Yōkai in Japanese folklore

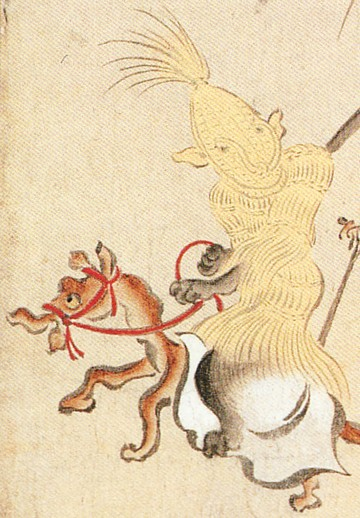
Depiction of a sandal-Yōkai in Hyakki Yagyō Emaki of the Muromachi period.

A Bakezōri (Japanese: 化け草履; literally meaning "ghost-sandal") is a being from Japanese folklore belonging to the group of Yōkai.

== Description ==
The Bakezōri is described as a wandering sandal with two arms and two legs, but only one eye. He is said to spook inhabited households during the night, running around and continuously chanting: "Kararin, kororin, kankororin, managu mittsu ni ha ninmai!" (カラリン、コロリン、カンコロリン、まなぐ三つに歯二ん枚; "Kararin, kororin, kankororin! They have three eyes and two teeth!"). Most possibly he's mocking his "more noble cousins", the famous Geta.

== Background ==
Design model of the Bakezōri may have been Zōri, traditional sandals made of braided rice straw.

The being Bakezōri belongs to a special group of Yōkai, called Tsukumogami (付喪神; "artifact-demons"): According to Japanese folklore, households are like repair tools, kitchen appliances and even clothes of any kind which eventually come to life and receive their own consciousness when ignored or neglected for a long time (mostly after 100 years). Bakezōri are said to be normally harmless to humans, but they can start to rip or pester them. Their motivation is boredom and frustration, or simply revenge and jealousy. Most Bakezōri group up with other animated household stuff or clothes, or they simply leave home and run away.
