= Chinese art by medium and technique =

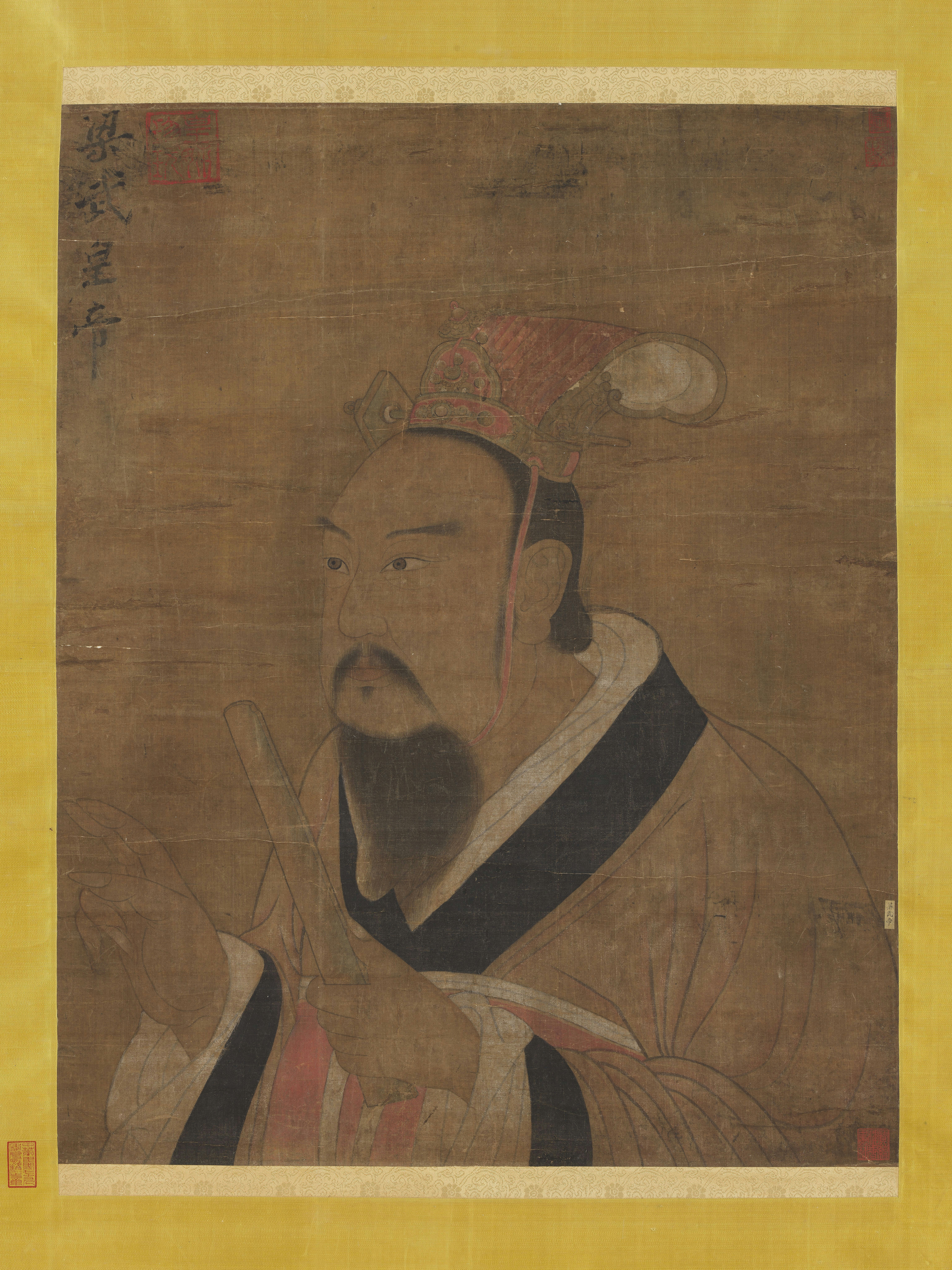
Xiao Yan, Martial Emperor of Liang, ca. 700 AD, National Palace Museum, Taipei.

Much traditional Chinese art was made for the imperial court, often to be then redistributed as gifts. As well as Chinese painting, sculpture and Chinese calligraphy, there is a great range of what may be called decorative or applied arts. Chinese fine art is distinguished from Chinese folk art, which differs in its style and purpose. This article gives an overview of the many different applied arts of China.

== Calligraphy ==
The Chinese imperial court collected calligraphy pieces from the most skilled calligraphers in the country. The collection contains many masterpieces made by well-known calligraphers throughout Chinese art history. Furthermore, because of calligraphy's high artistic value, calligraphy collecting was popular among several Chinese emperors in multiple dynasties.

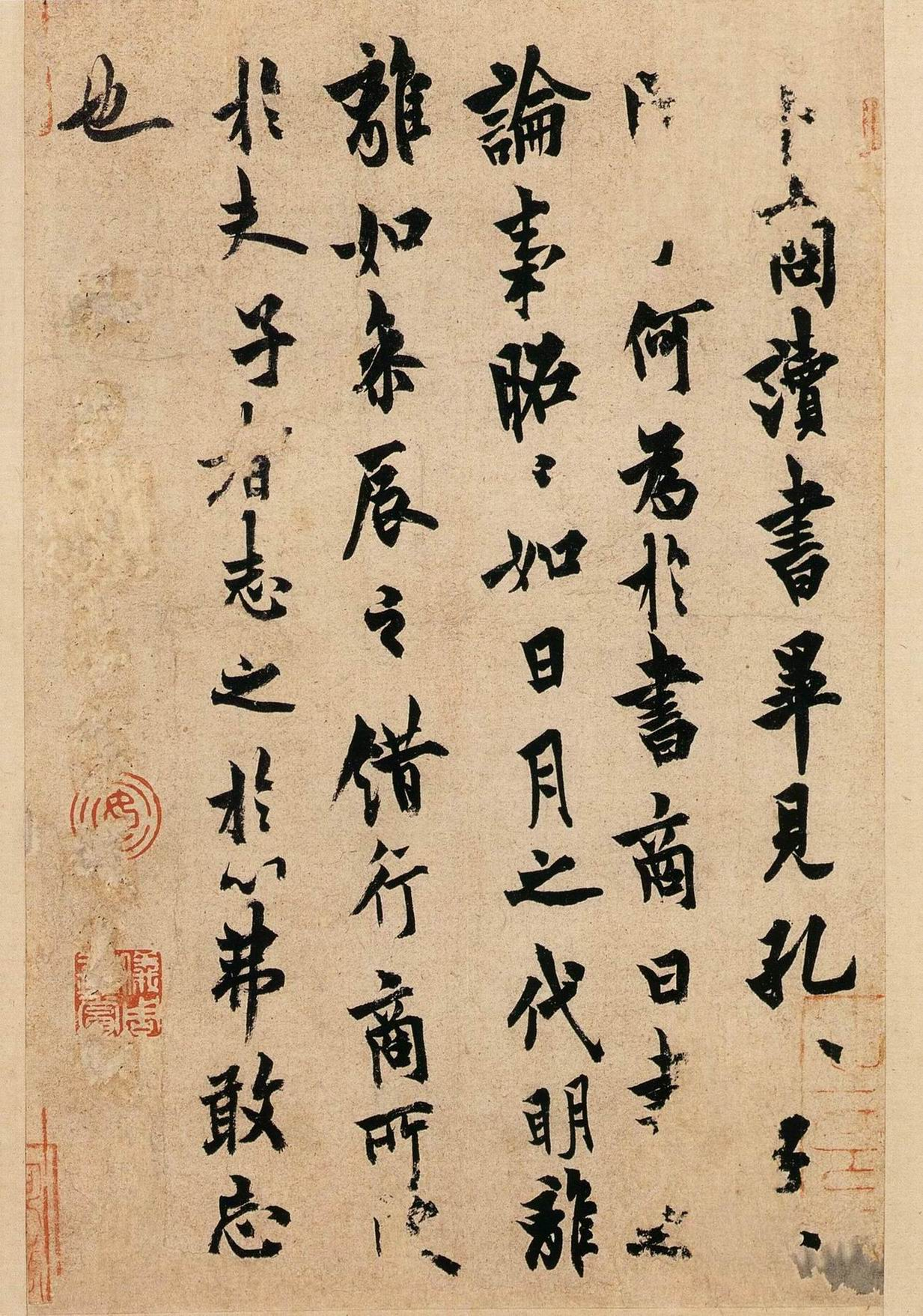
Bu Shang Tie by Ouyang Xun, Palace Museum, Beijing

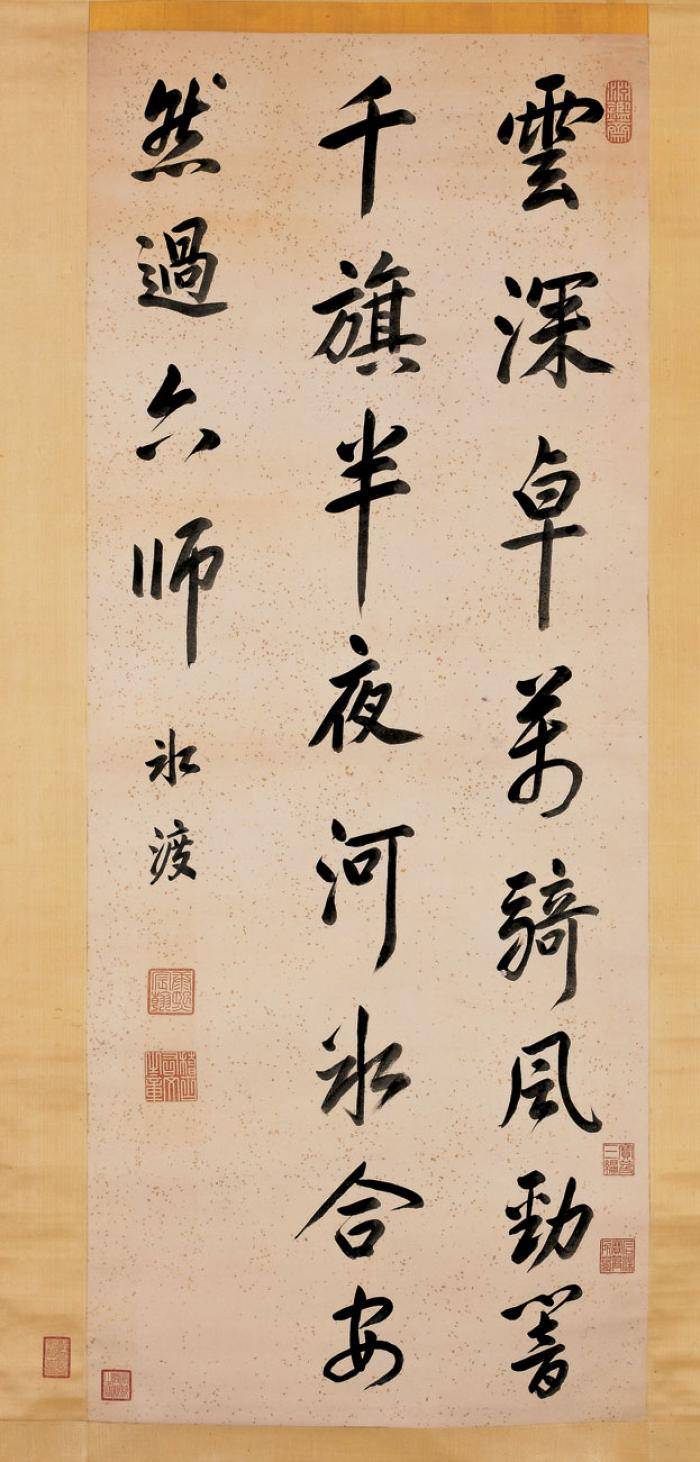
Crossing the Frozen River, a poem in running script by Kangxi Emperor (1654–1722), Palace Museum, Beijing

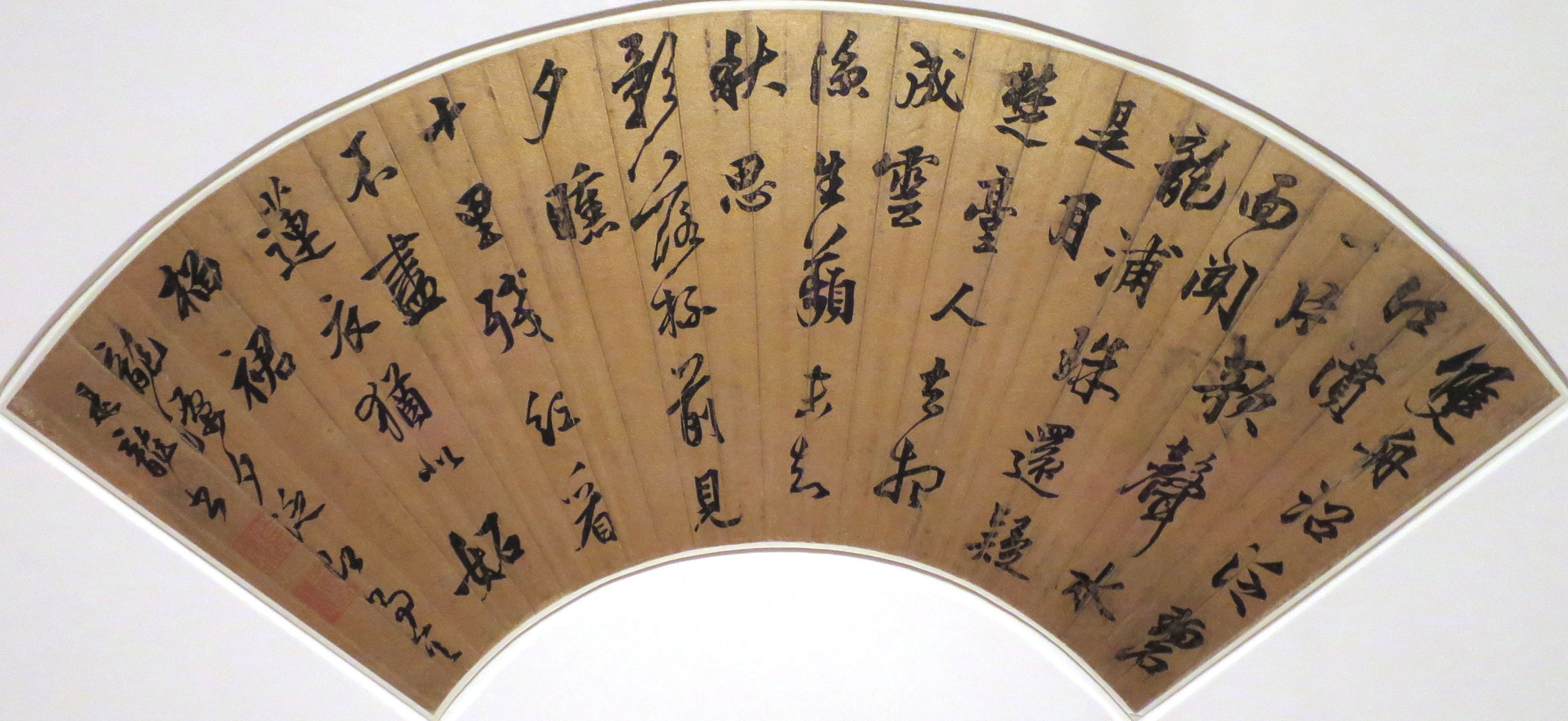
Calligraphy on fan by Mo Shilong, China, Ming dynasty, 16th century, ink on gold paper, Honolulu Academy of Arts

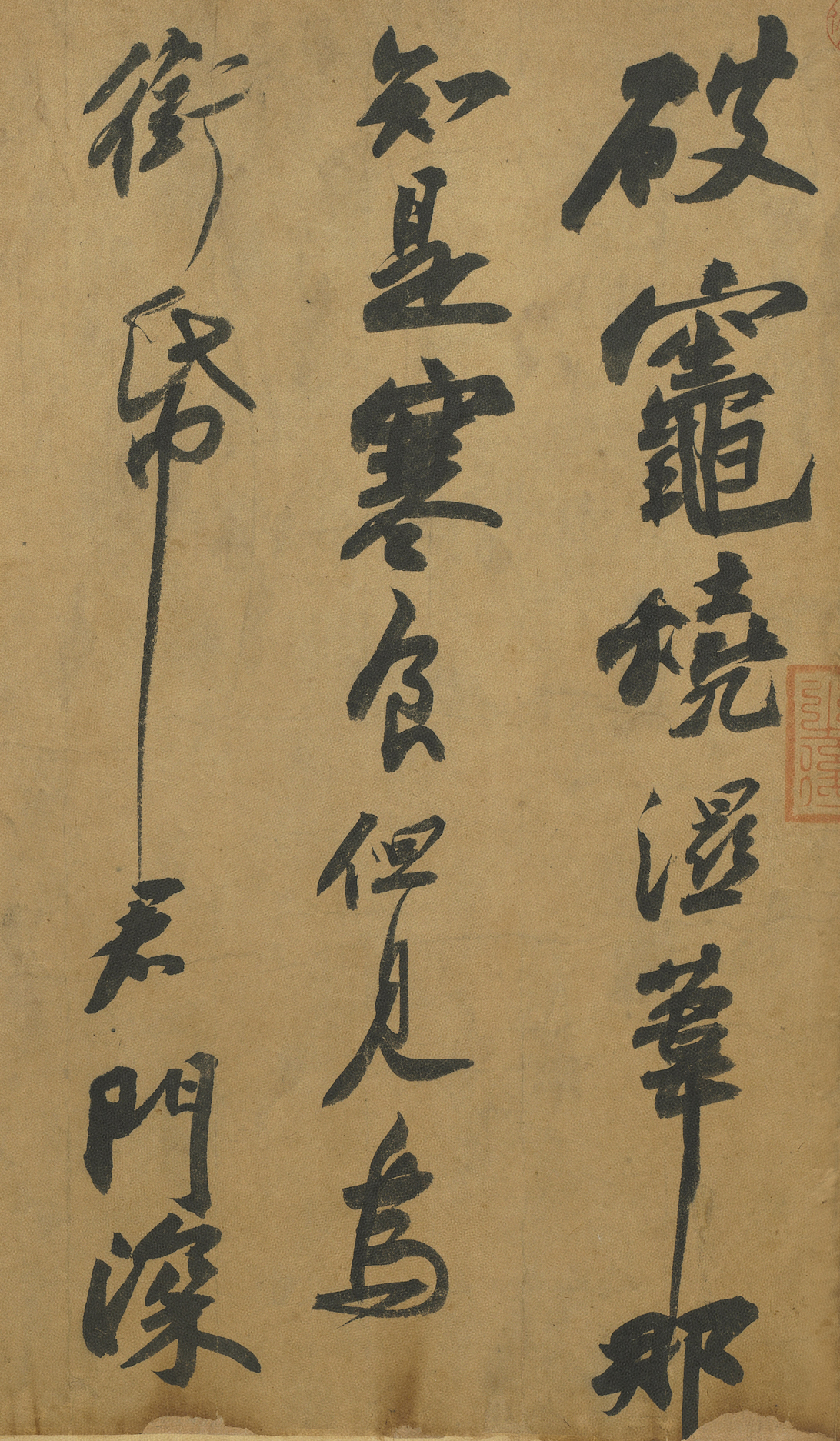
The Cold Food Observance (detail), ink on paper, by Su Shi, National Palace Museum, Taipei

== Ceramics ==
Chinese ceramics, whose history originates back to the pre-dynastic periods, has continuously improved since then, and it is one of the most significant forms of Chinese art.

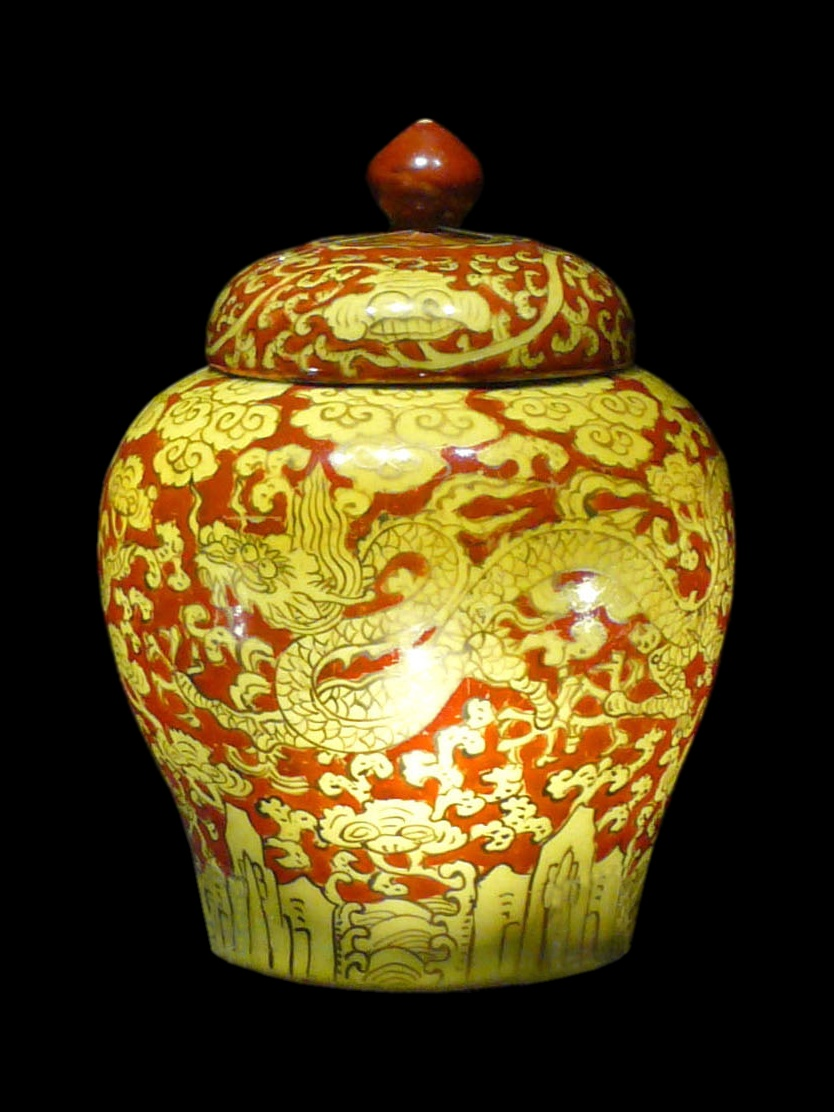
Yellow dragon jar, Ming dynasty. 1521–1567. Palace Museum, Beijing.

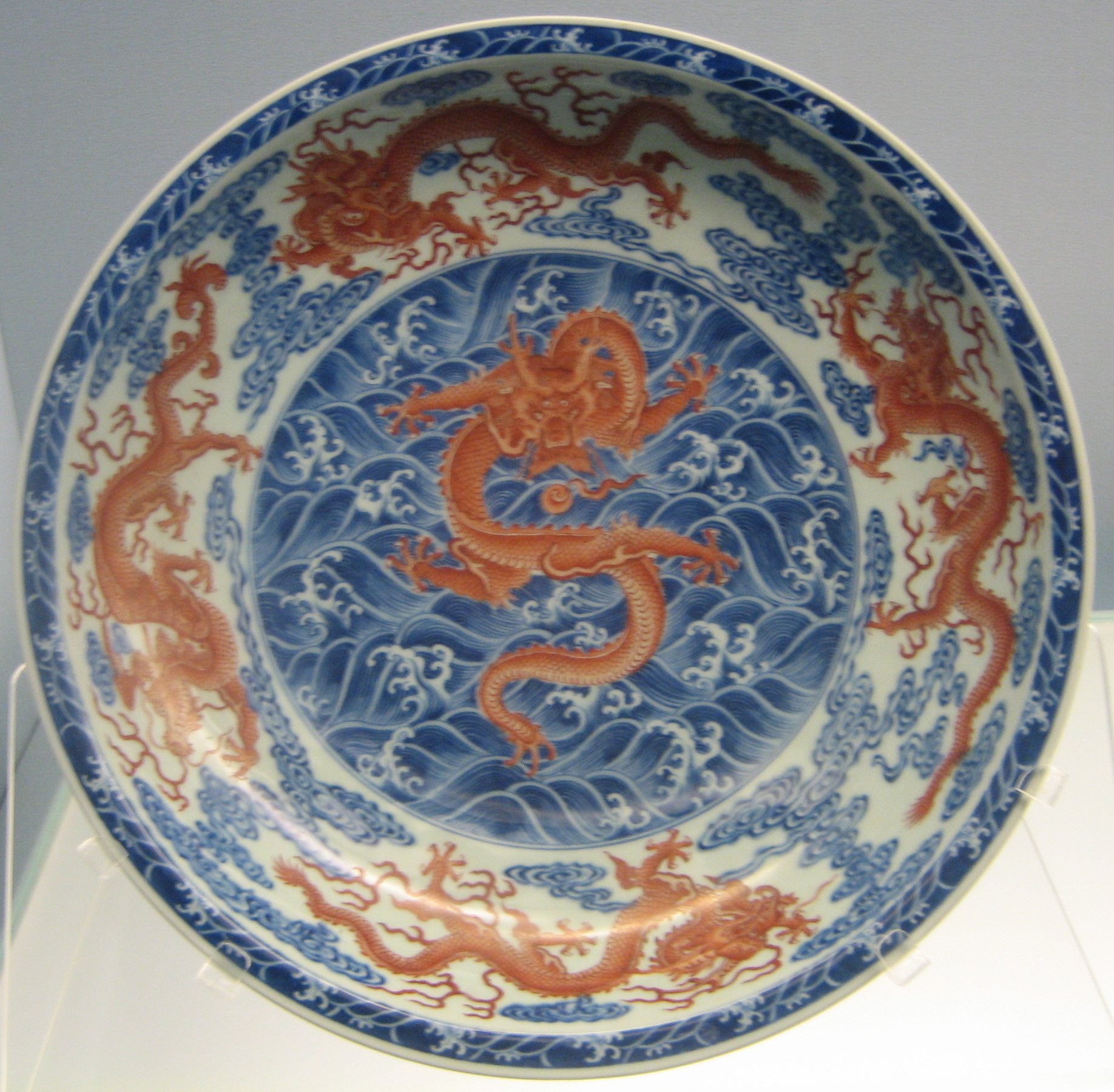
Dish with underglazed blue and overglazed red design of clouds and dragons, Jingdezhen ware, Yongzheng period (1723–1735), Qing dynasty, Shanghai Museum

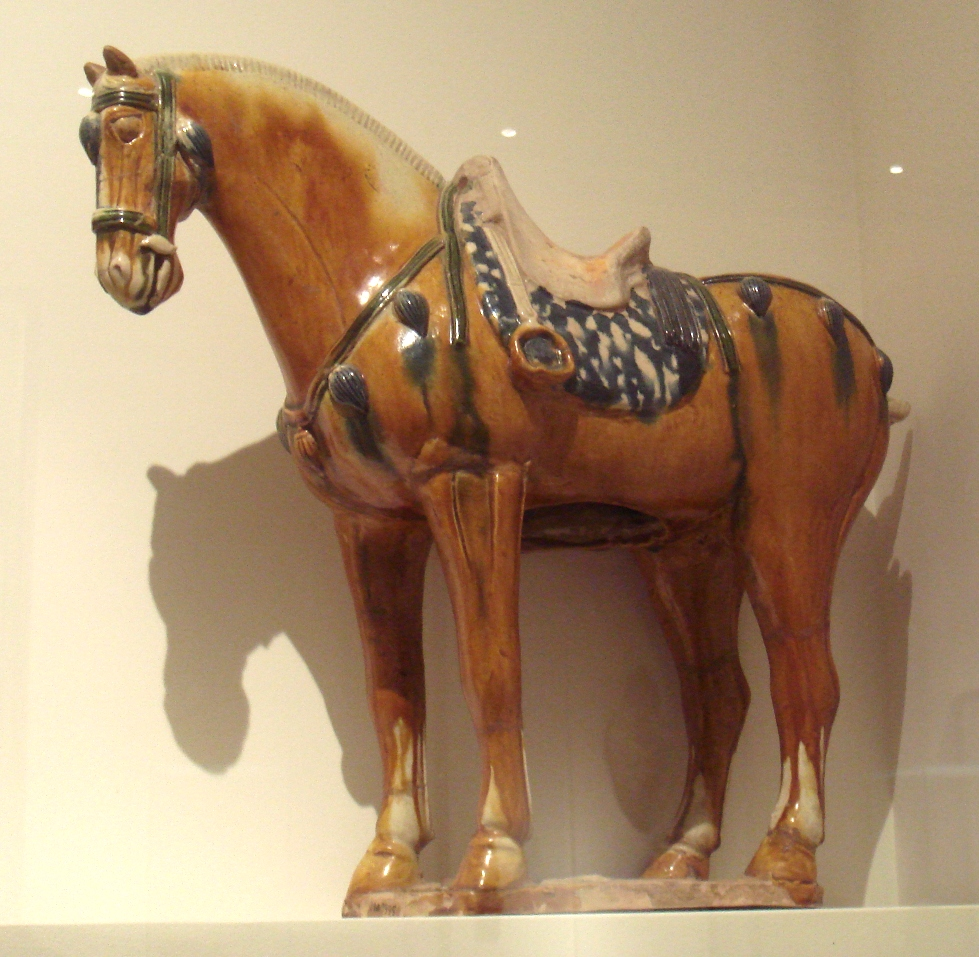
Sancai glazed ceramic horse, Tang dynasty, 7th–8th century, Musée Guimet

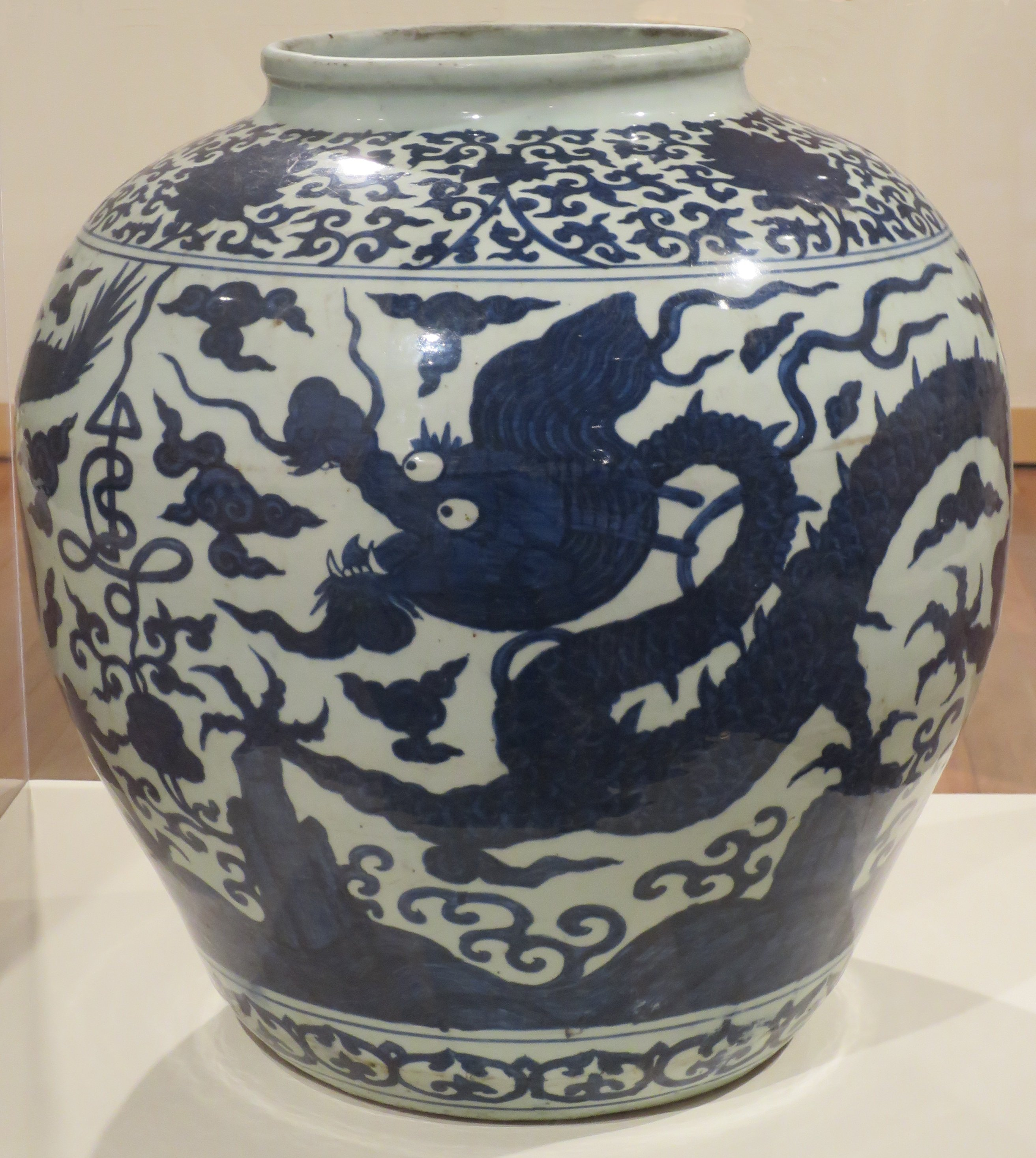
Chinese jar, Ming dynasty, Jiajing period (1521–1567), porcelain, Honolulu Academy of Arts

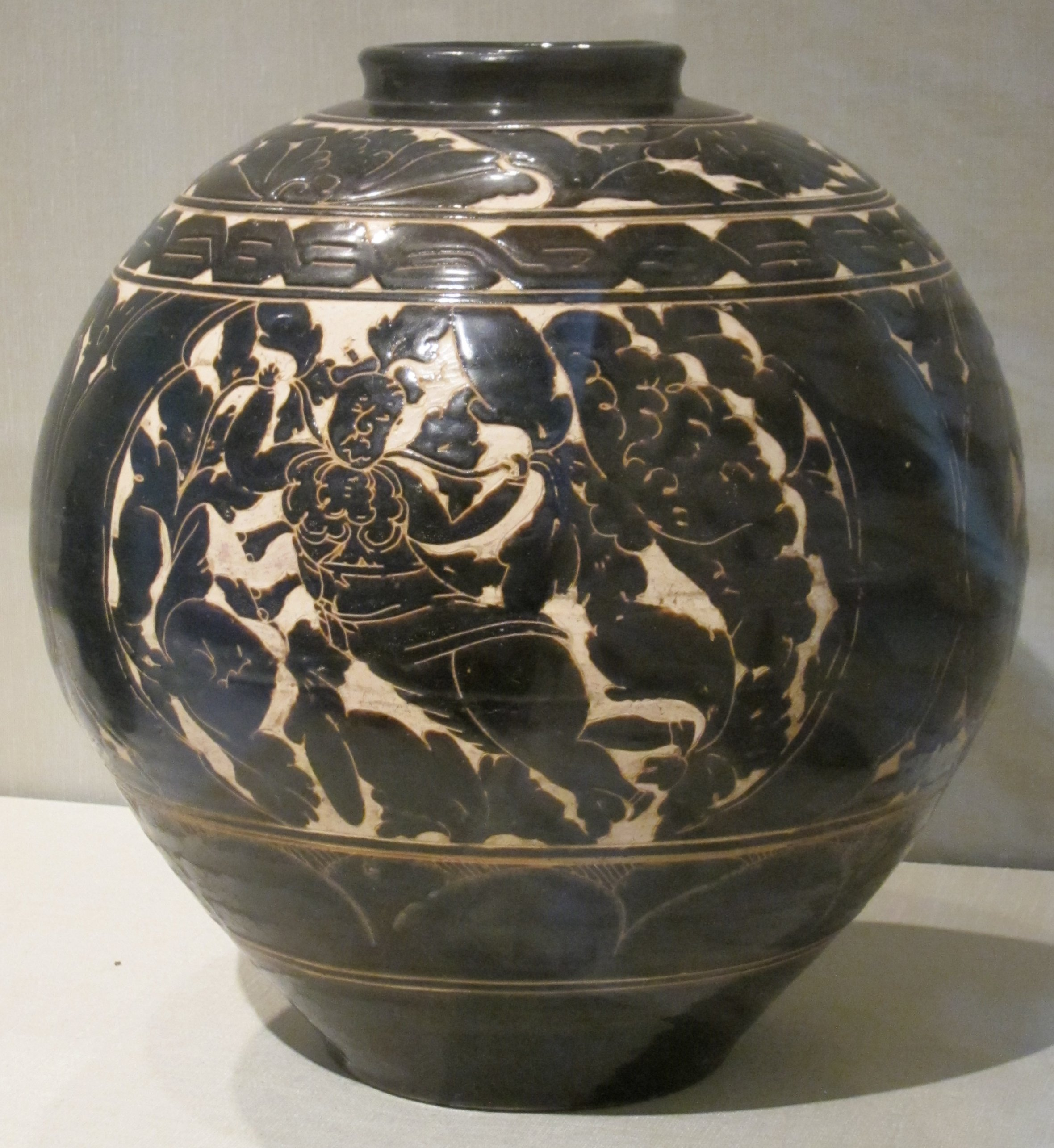
Chinese glazed stoneware jar, Yuan dynasty, Honolulu Academy of Arts

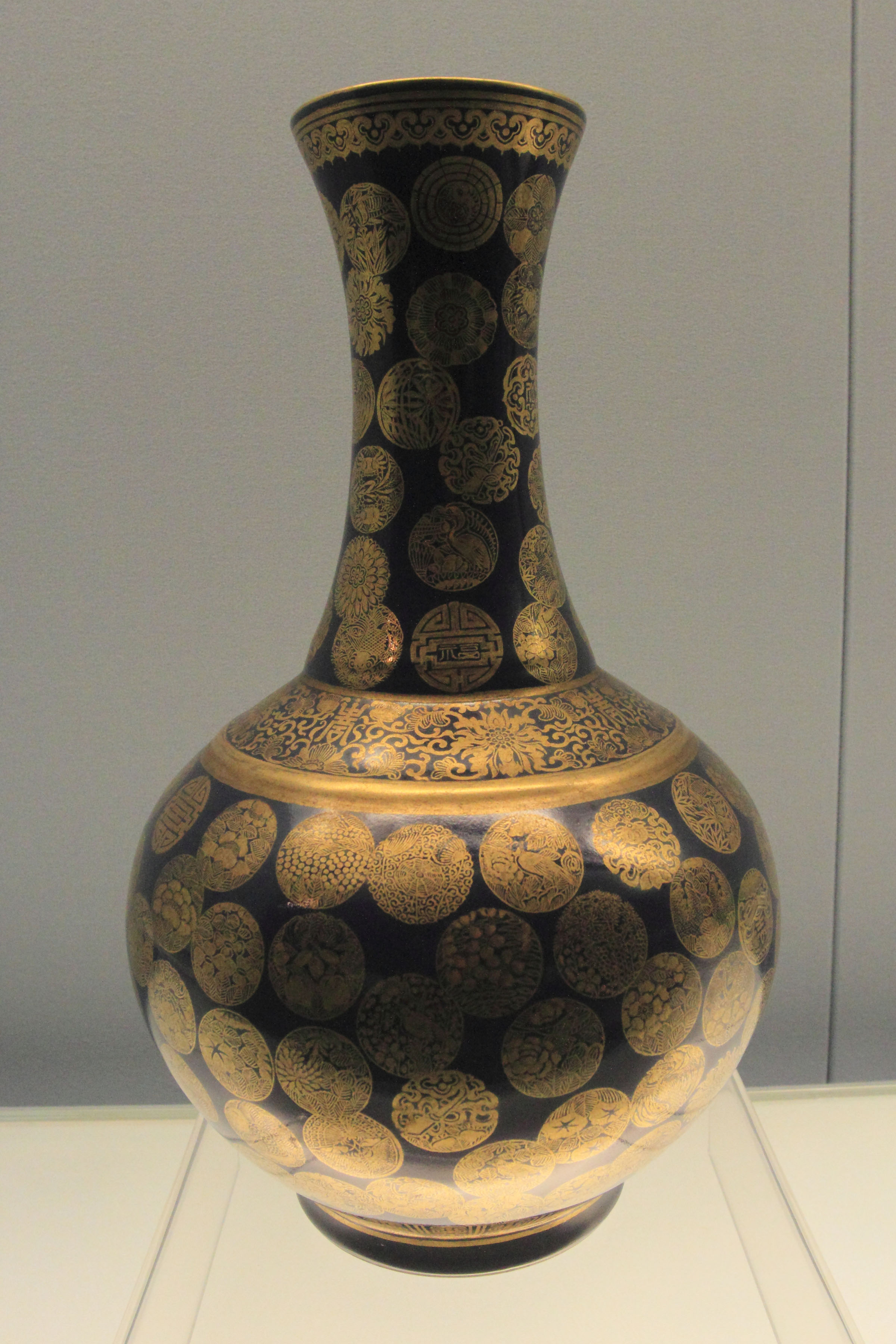
Blue glazed vase with golden medallion design, Jingdezhen ware,1875–1908 A.D., a collection of Shanghai Museum

=== Snuff bottle ===
After opium was introduced to China, snuff bottles became popular. The Chinese royalties were addicted to them, as they used opium as a long-life medicine. The design of the snuff bottles flourished because of the money that the rich poured into the industry. Many of these bottles were made by talented artisans using tiny paints brushes; they were painted from inside of the bottle, reaching down from the top of the narrow neck. They are still highly collectible up to this day.

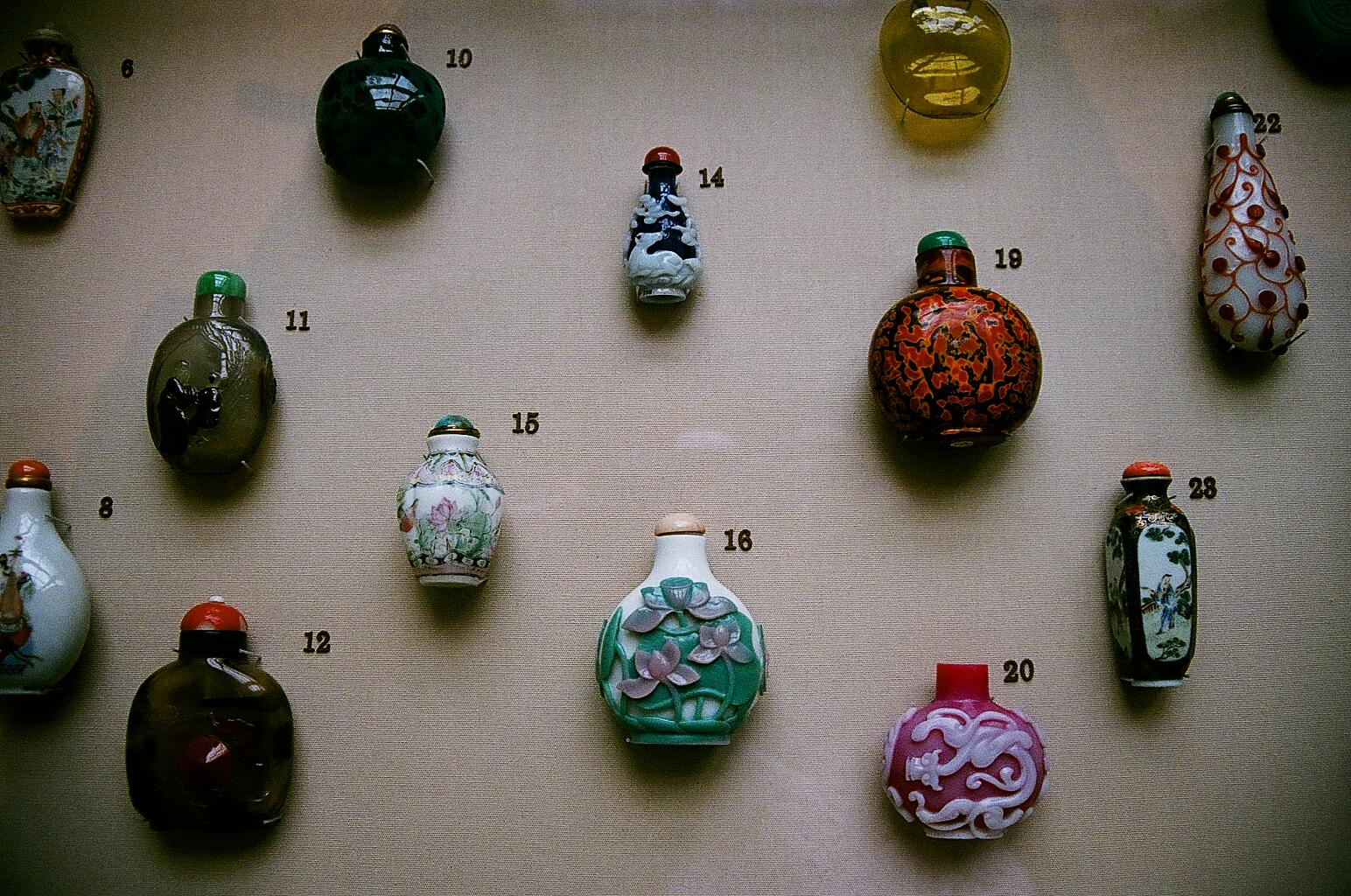
Chinese snuff bottles, various time periods, British Museum in London.

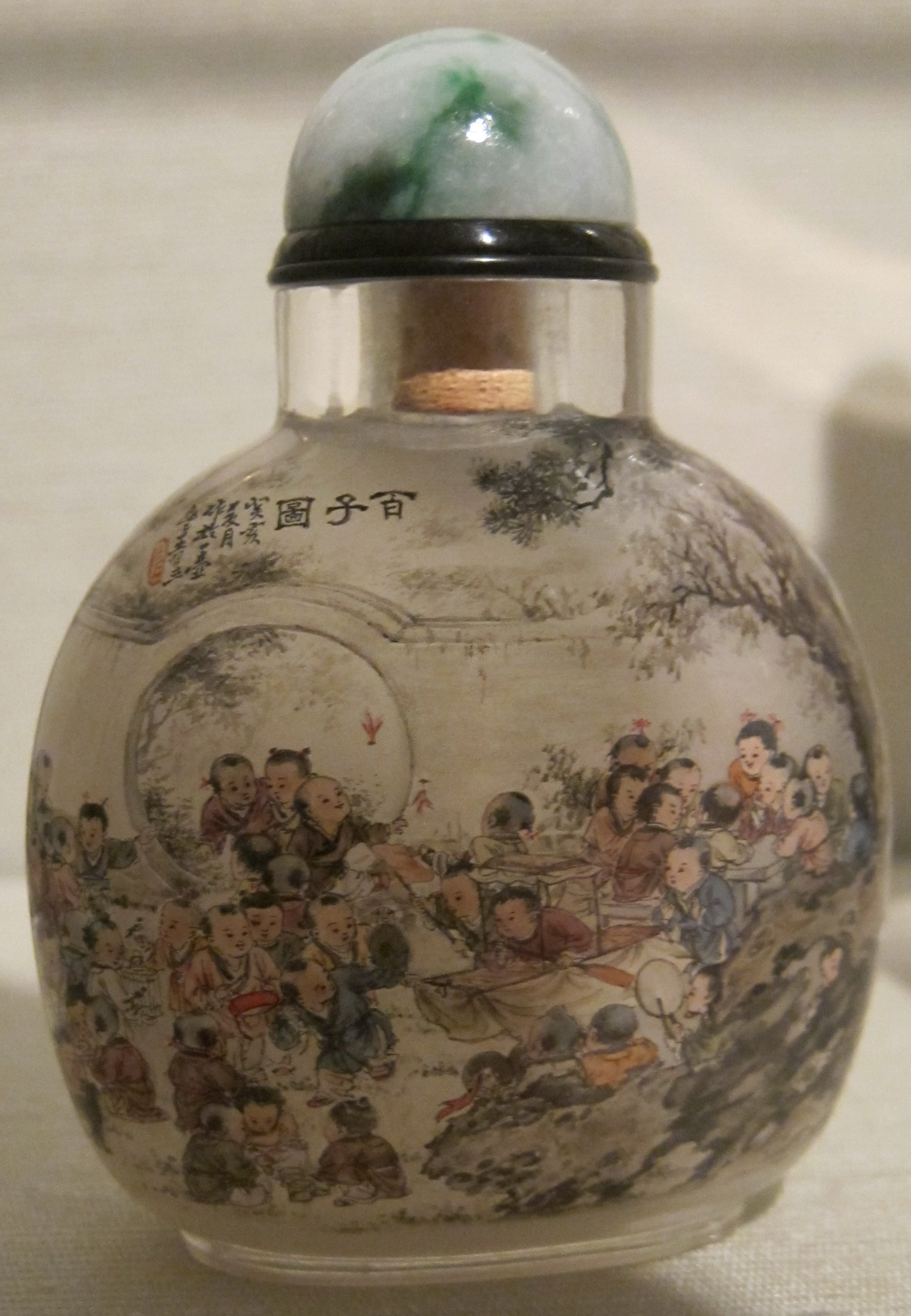
Chinese snuff bottle, 19th century, glass bottle with jadeite stopper, Honolulu Museum of Art

== Cloisonné ==
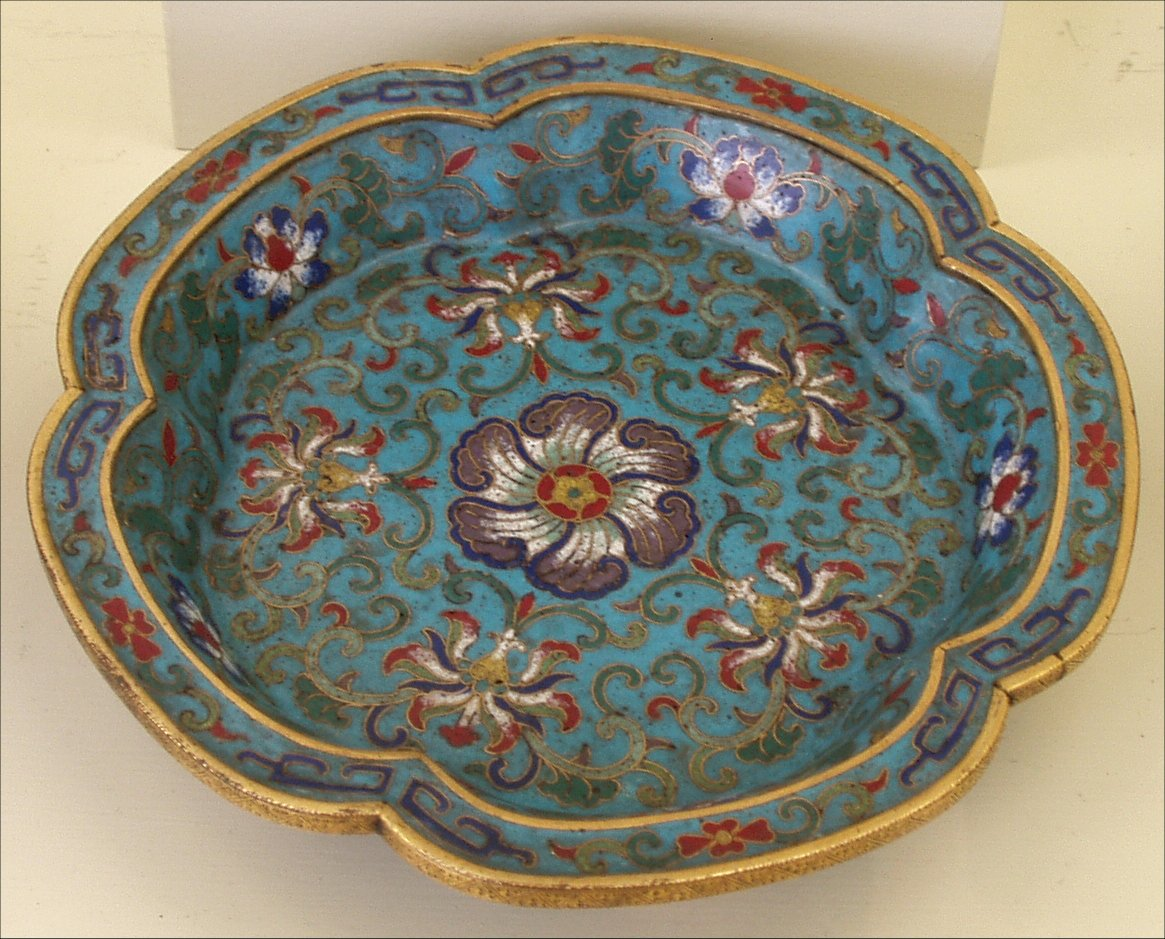
Cloisonne dish, Qing dynasty, Royal Museum, Edinburgh

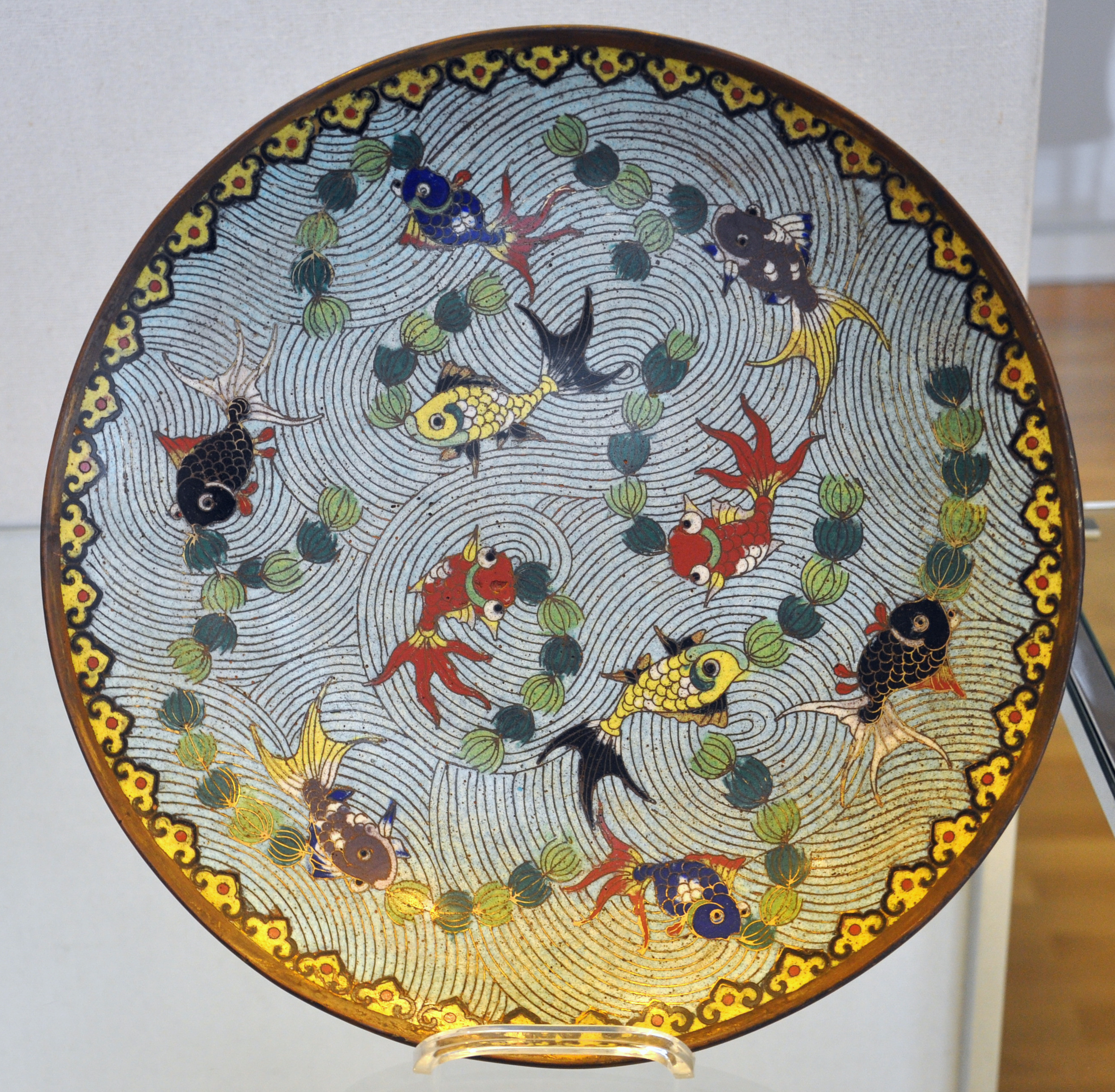
Large gilded copper plate with cloisonné, Qing dynasty, 19th century, Museum für Angewandte Kunst, Frankfurt

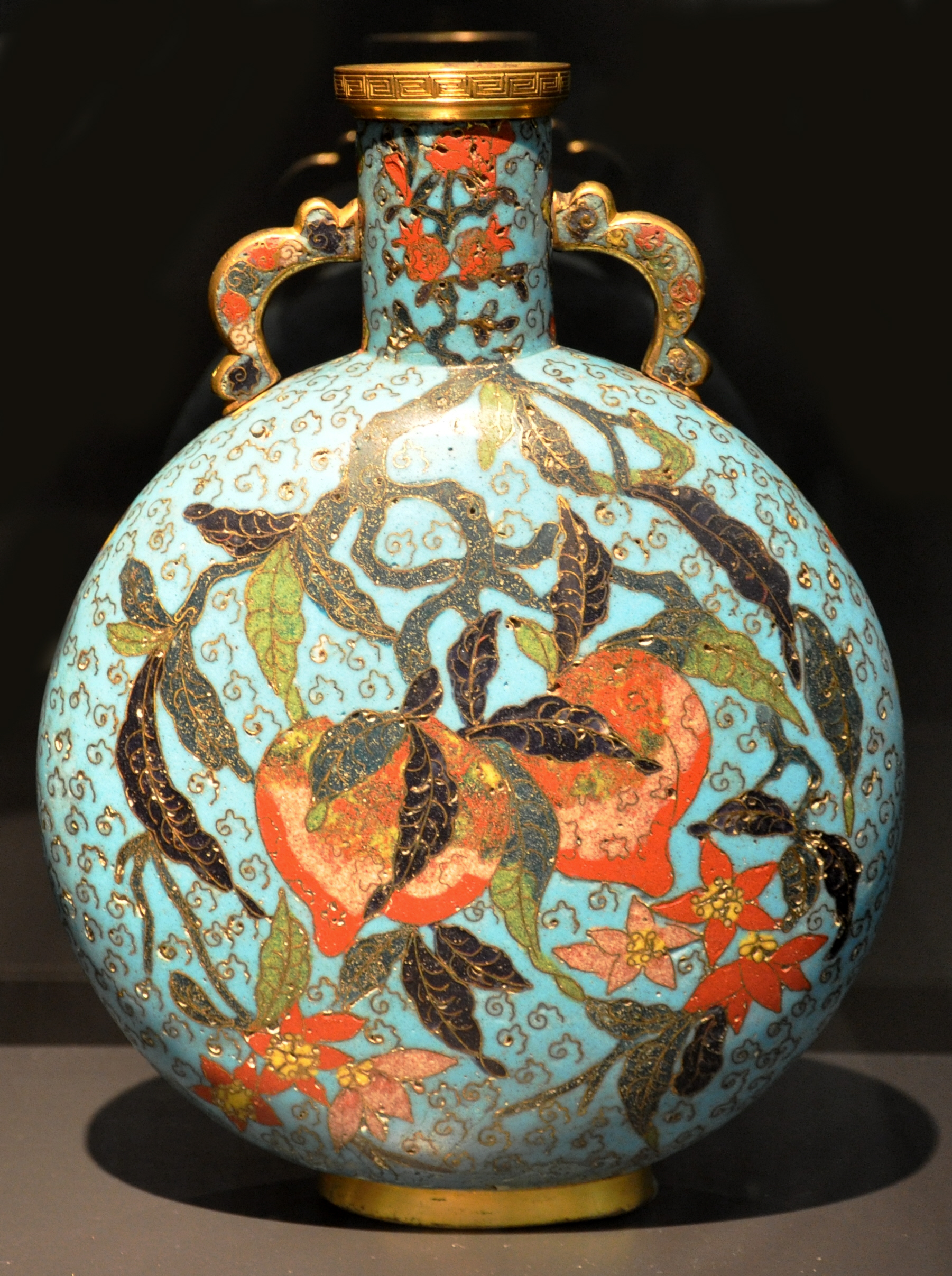
Pilgrim flask decorated with peaches and pomegranates; Ming dynasty, 1st half of 17th century, Museum Rietberg, Zurich

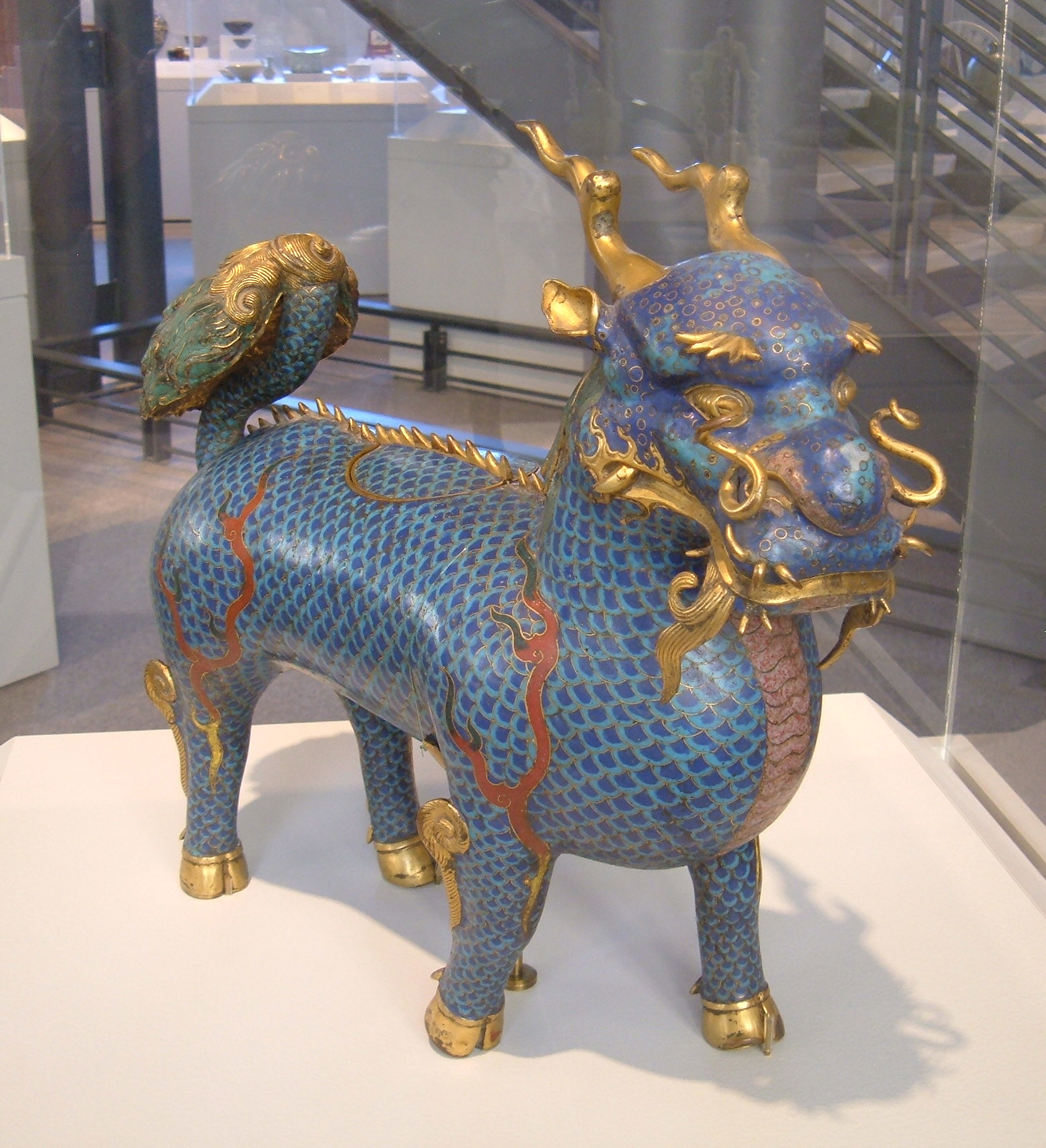
Qilin-shaped incense burner (17th–18th centuries) on display at the Iris & B. Gerald Cantor Center for Visual Arts on the Stanford University campus in Stanford, California.

== Engraving ==
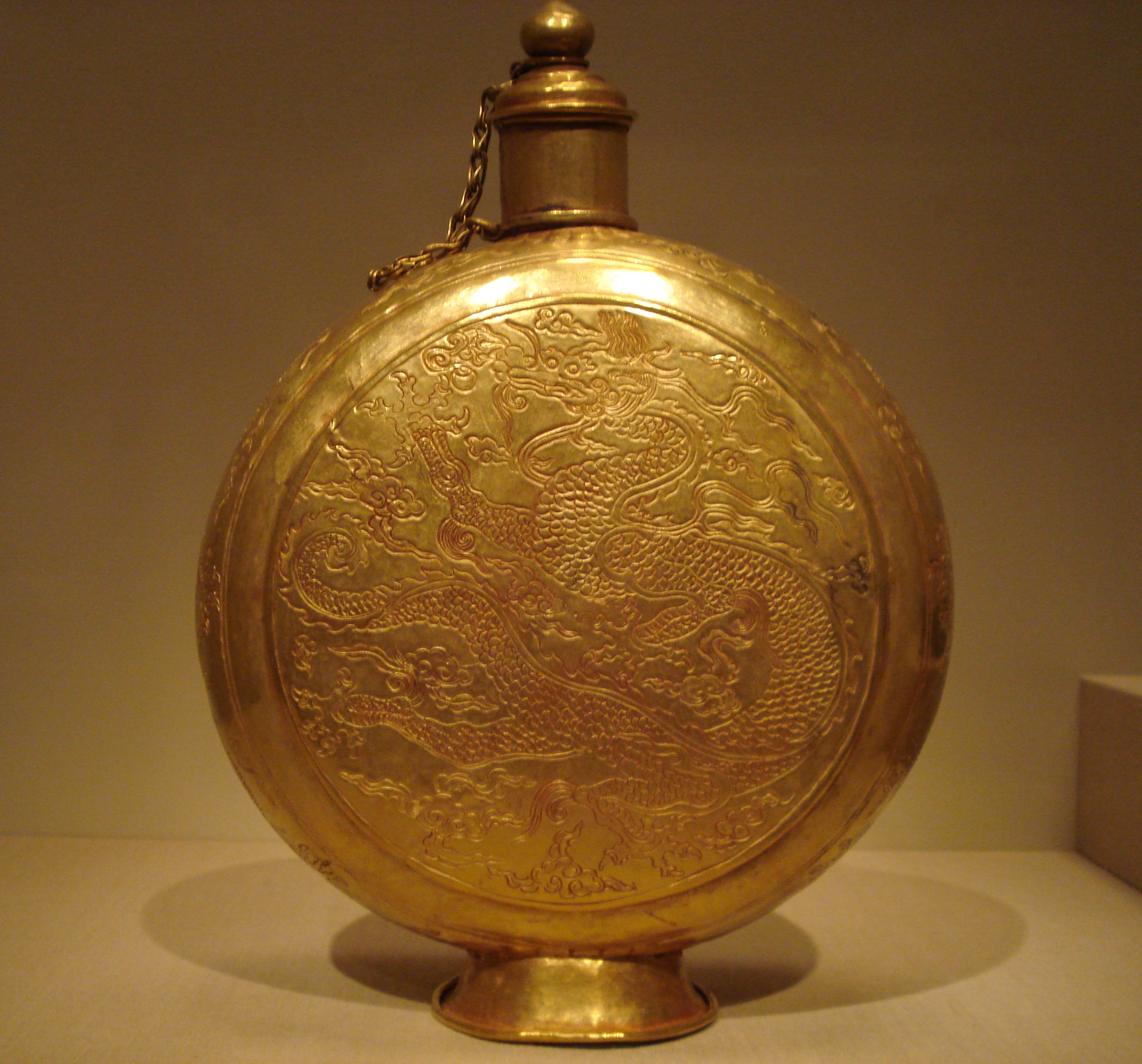
A golden canteen made during the Chinese Ming dynasty, dated 15th century, Freer and Sackler Galleries, Washington D.C.

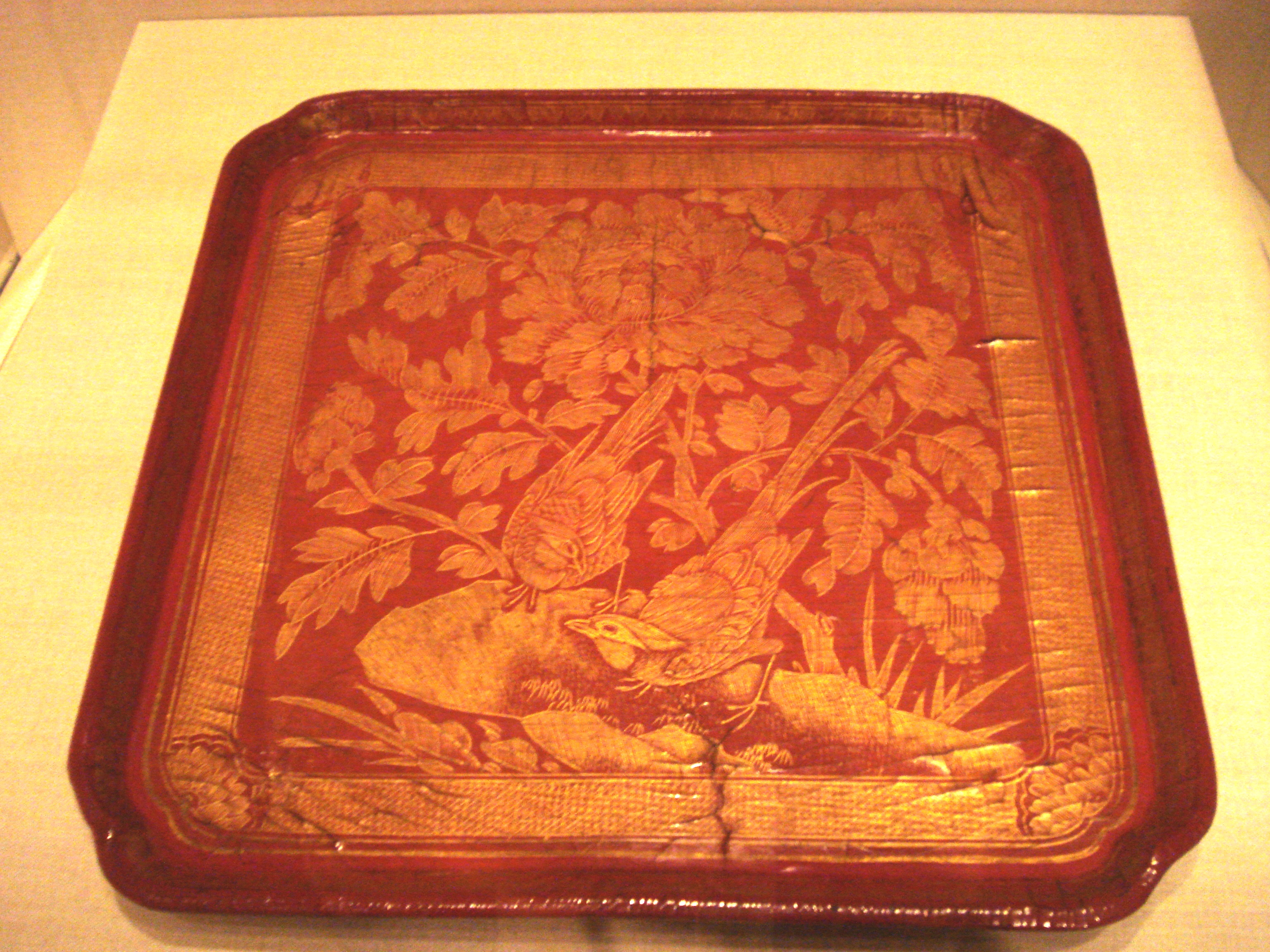
A Chinese red lacquer tray over wood with engraved golden foil, from the Song dynasty (960–1279 AD), dated 12th to early 13th century. Freer and Sackler Galleries, Washington D.C.

== Glassware ==
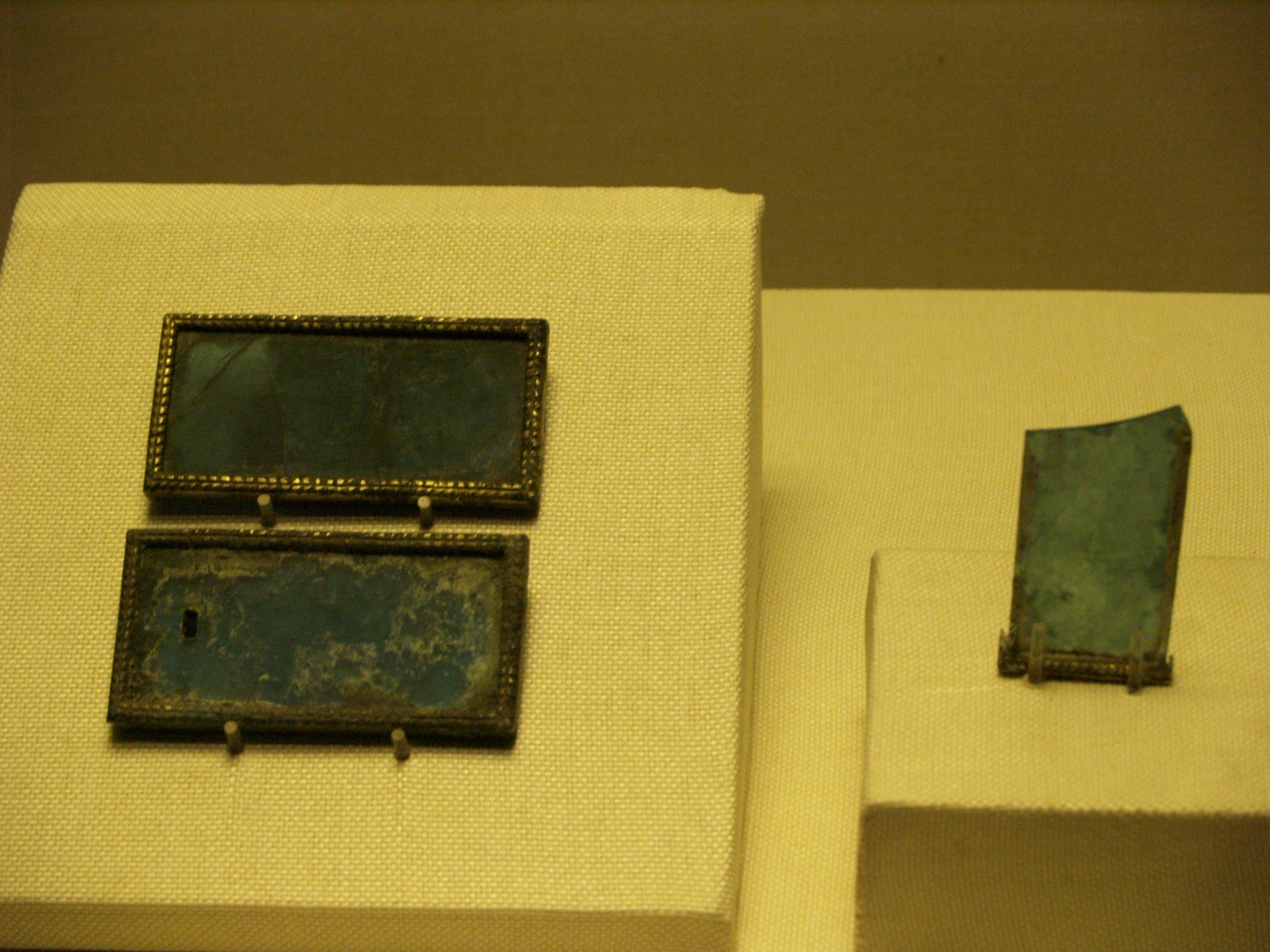
Blue glass plaques found in the Mausoleum of the Nanyue King, dating from late 2nd century BC.

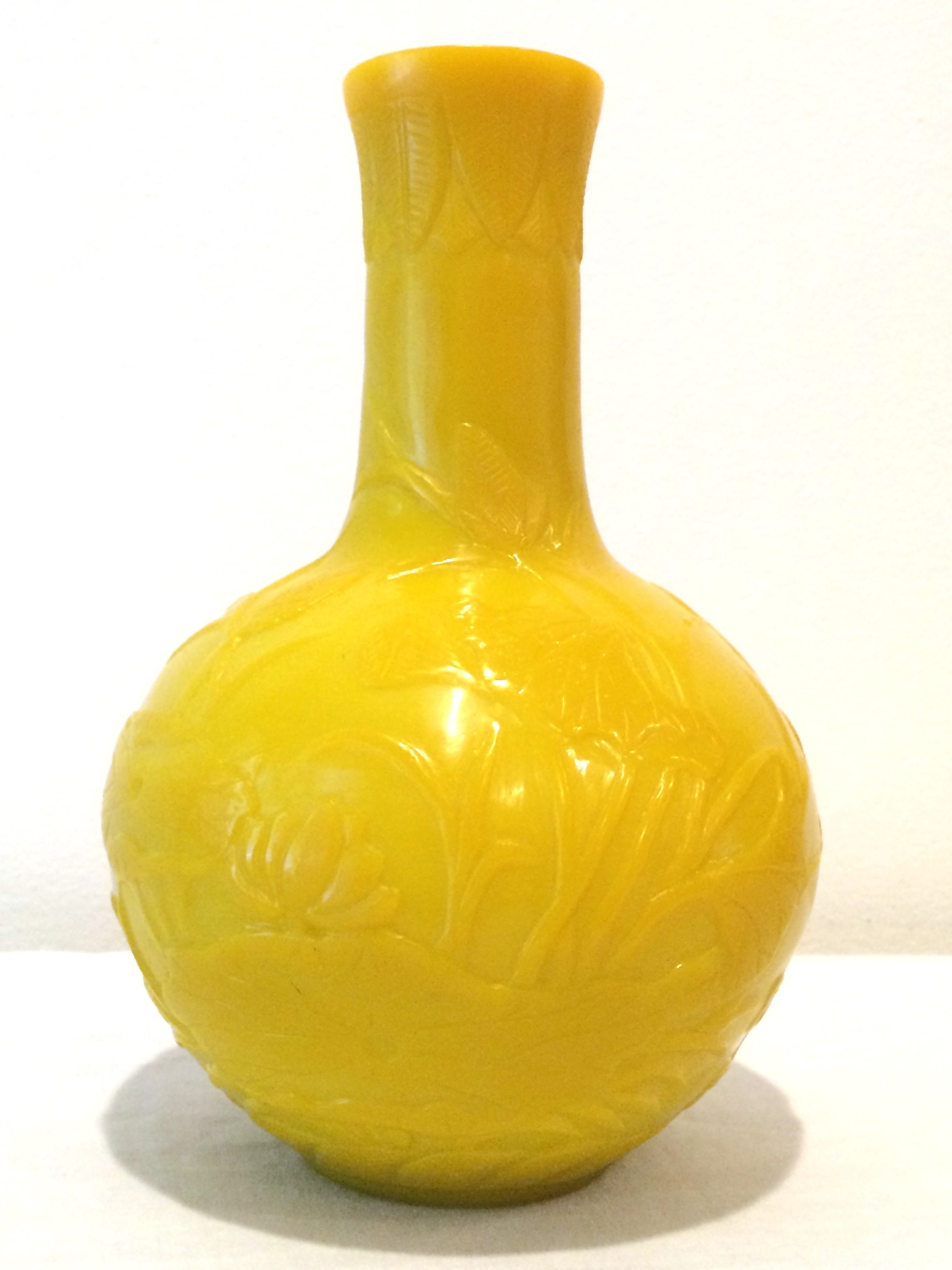
Early 19th century Peking glass vase in Imperial Yellow.

== Jewellery ==
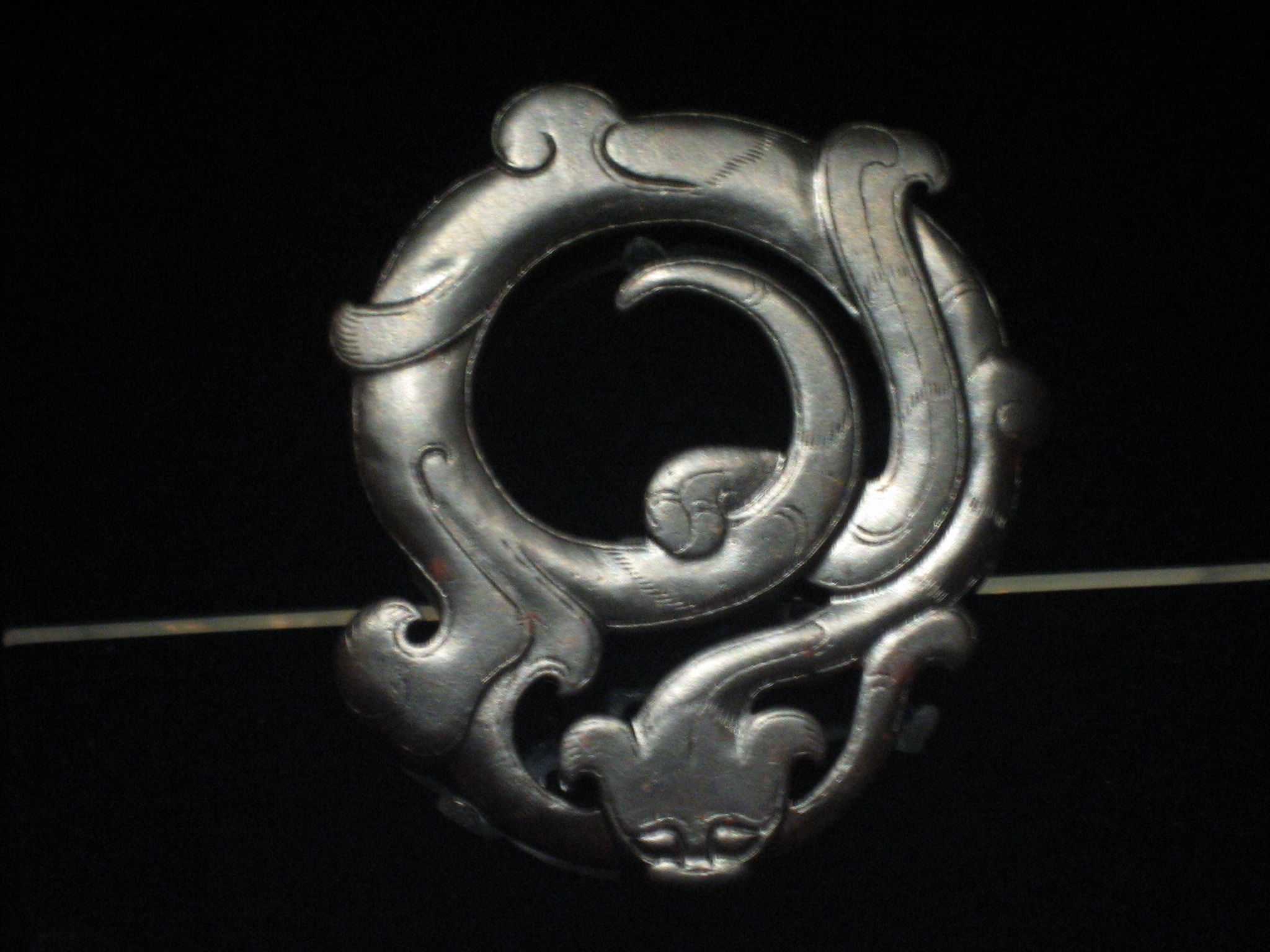
Huan in shape of a coiled serpent, jade ware, Eastern Han, Shanghai Museum

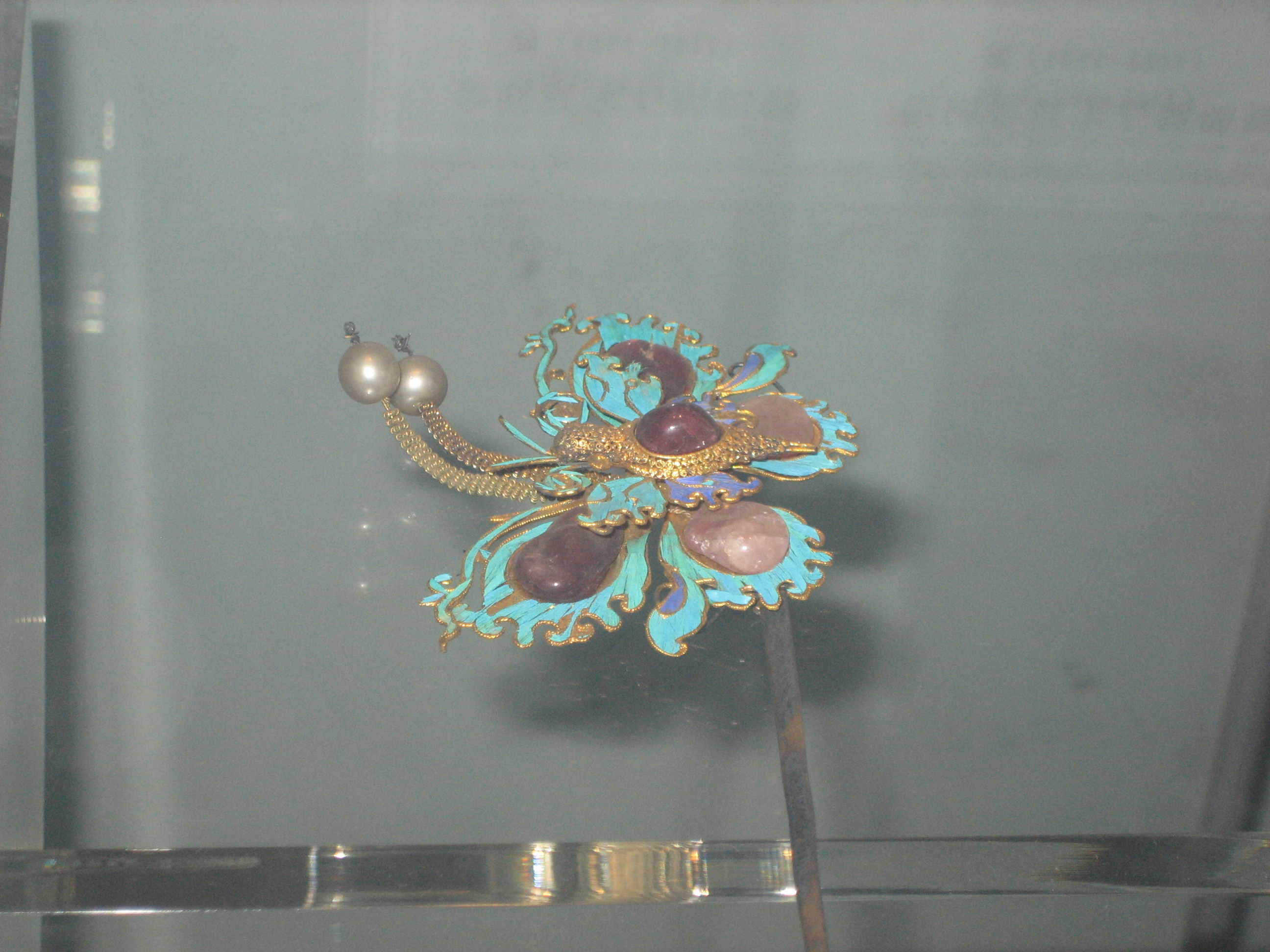
Hair pin, art collection in the Palace Museum, Beijing

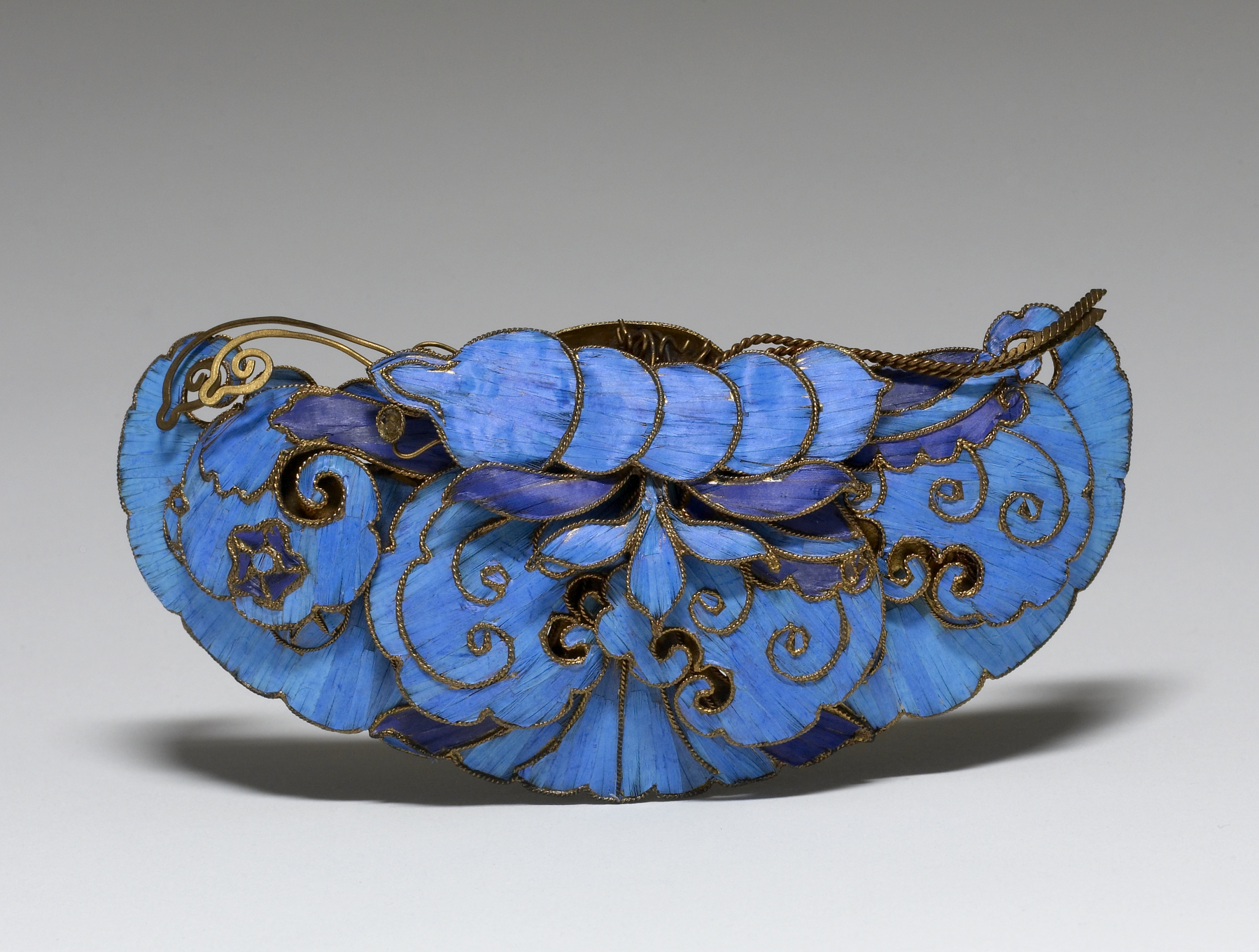
Hair ornament, 19th century, Walters Art Museum

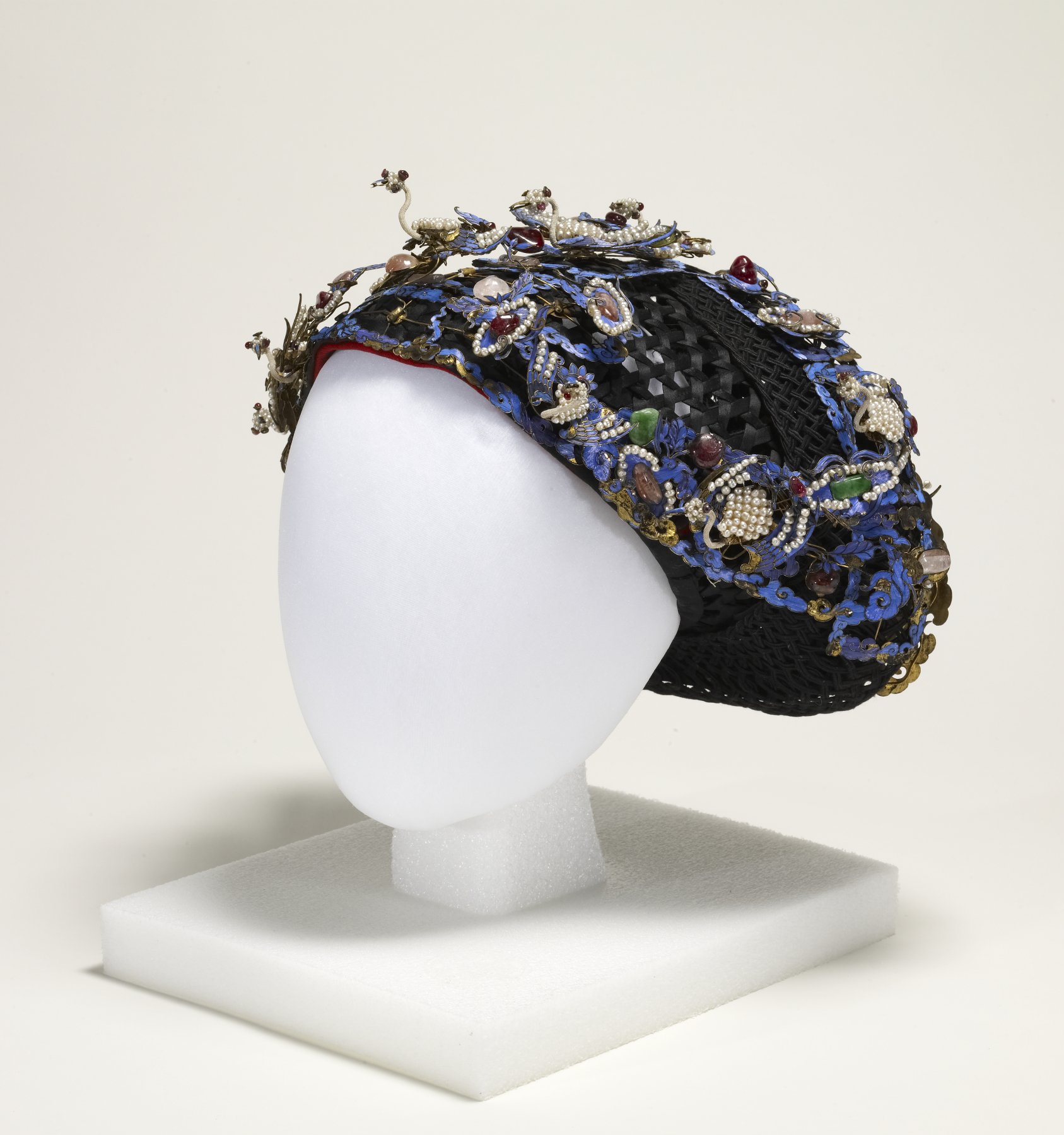
Ceremonial headdress, 19th century, Walters Art Museum

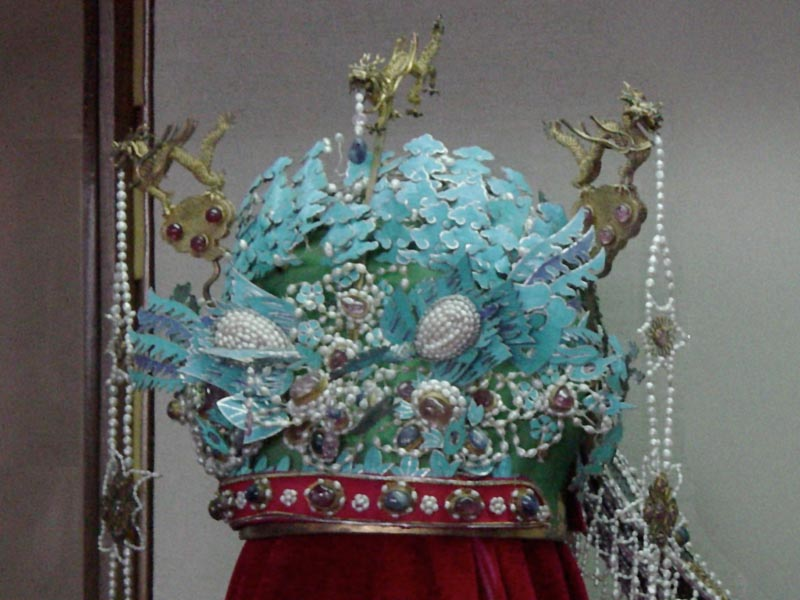
Chinese Imperial Queen's Headdress, Ming dynasty, Mings Tomb Museum

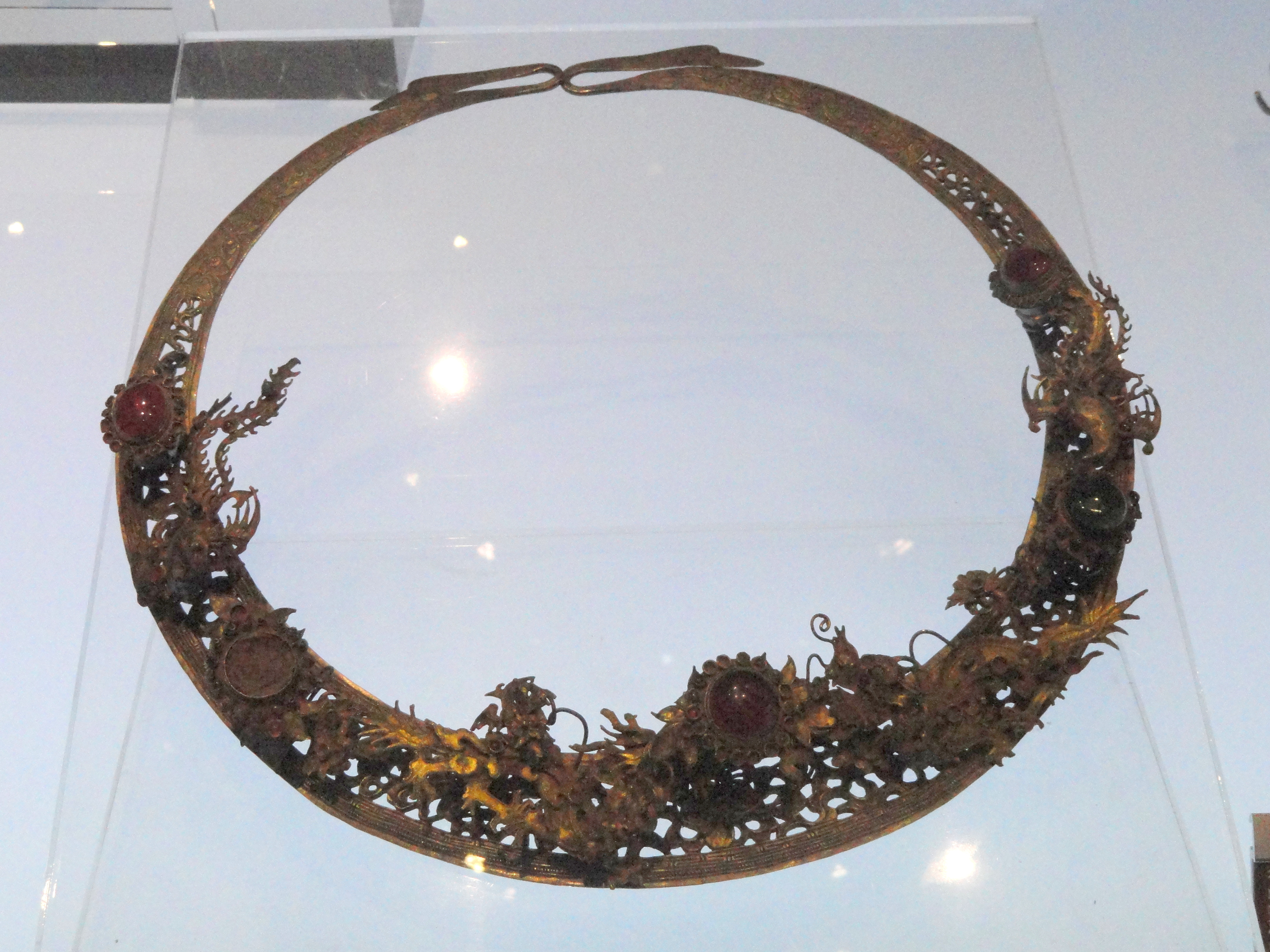
Dai necklace, metalwork, Yunnan Provincial Museum, Kunming, Yunnan

== Lacquer ==
It was during the Shang dynasty (c. 1600–1046 BCE) when the sophisticated techniques used in the lacquer process were first developed, and it became a highly artistic craft. Various prehistoric lacquerware have been unearthed in China dating back to the Neolithic period. The earliest extant lacquer object, a red wooden bowl, was unearthed at a Hemudu culture (c. 5000–4500 BCE) site. By the Han dynasty (206 BCE – 220 CE), many centers of lacquer production had become established. The knowledge of the Chinese methods focusing on the lacquer process spread from China during the Han, Tang, and Song dynasties. Later on, it was eventually introduced to the rest of the world—Korea, Japan, Southeast and South Asia.

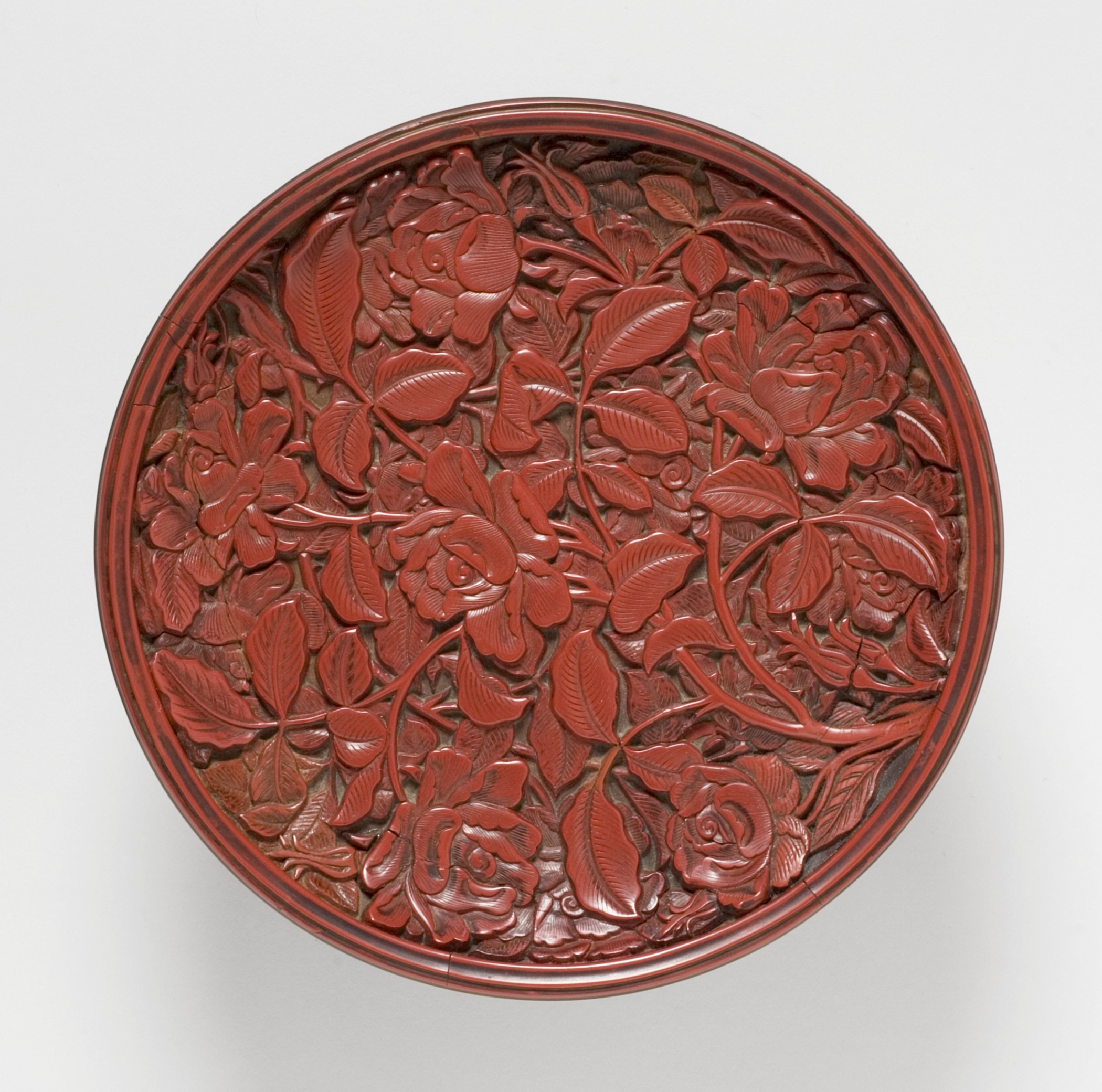
Carved lacquer tray with roses, Yuan dynasty, 16 cm across

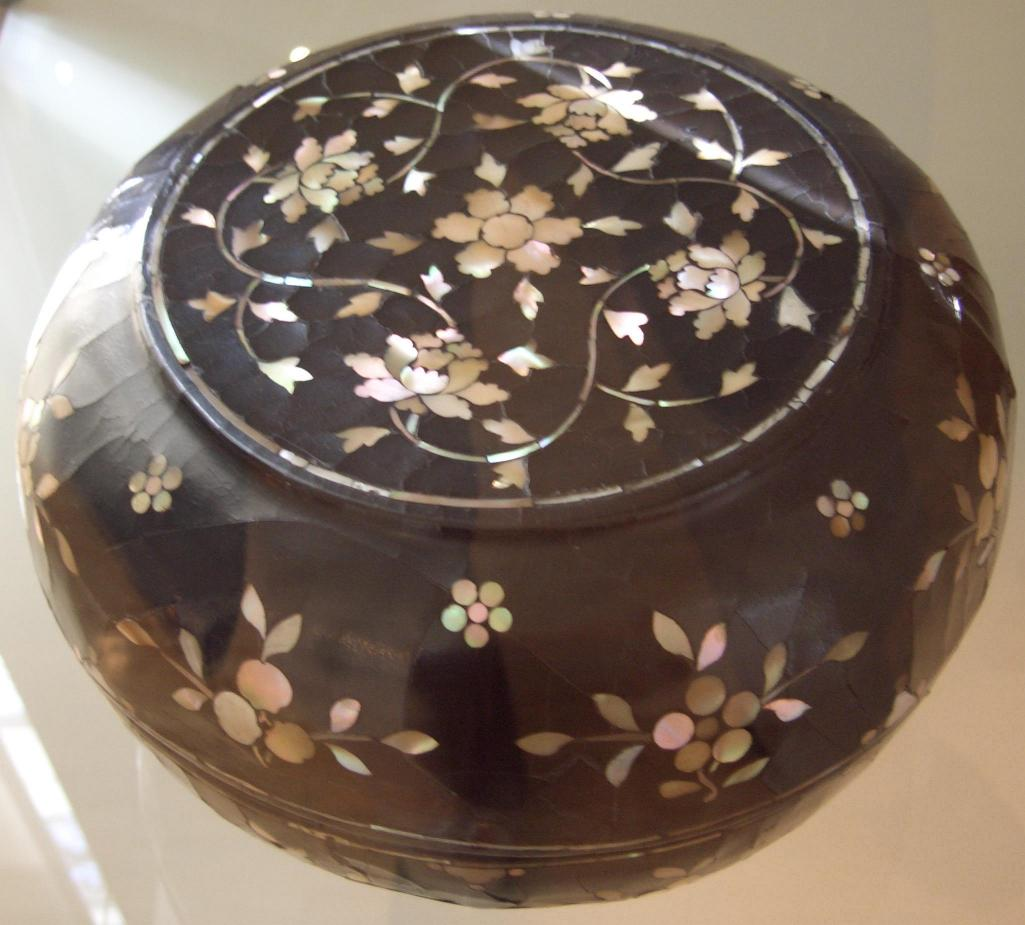
Chinese mother of pearl lacquer box with peony decor, Ming dynasty, 16th century, Museum für Lackkunst, Münster (Germany)

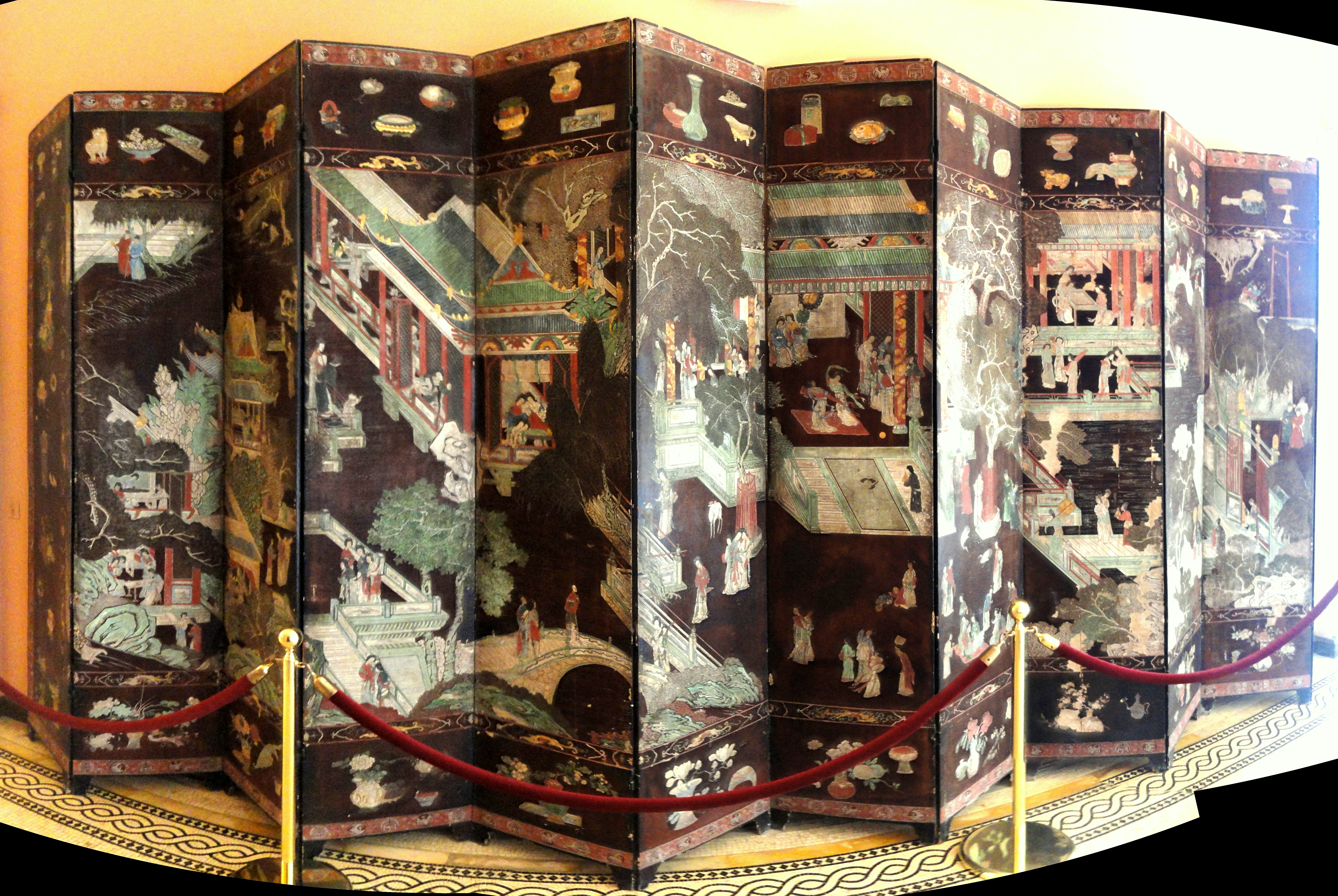
Coromandel lacquer screen with figures in pavilions and a main border with a "hundred antiques".

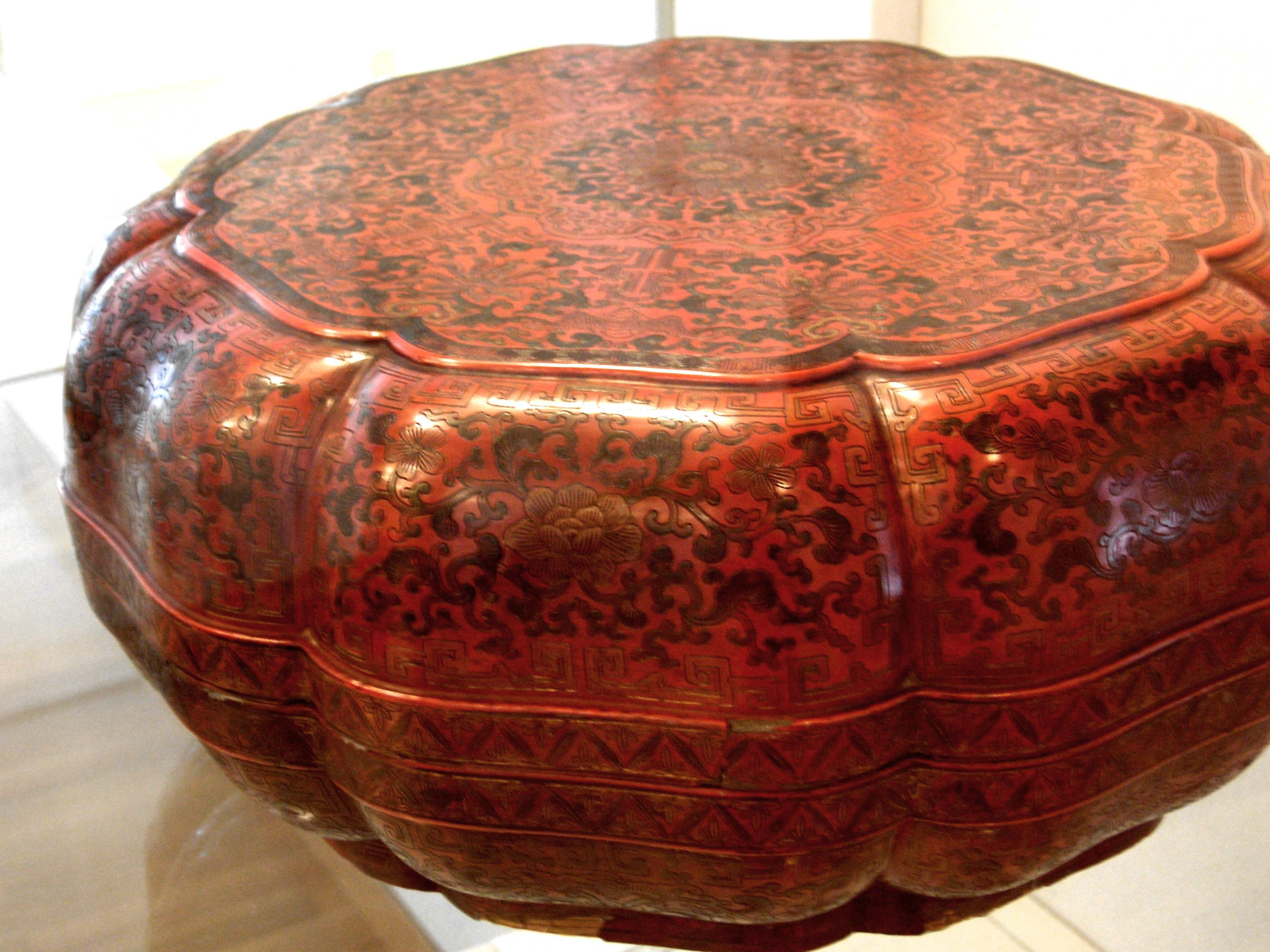
Chinese lacquerware box from the Qing dynasty, Museum für angewandte Kunst, Frankfurt, Germany

== Painting ==
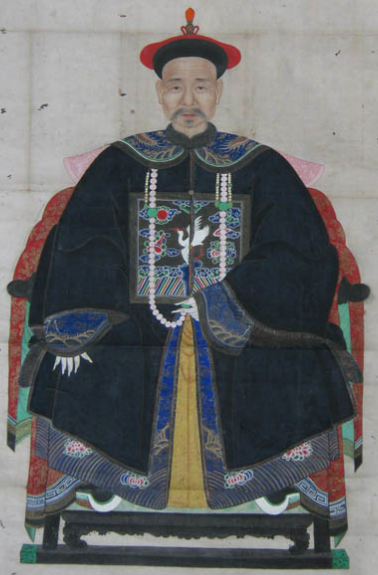
Hanging scroll, color on silk, National Palace Museum, Taipei

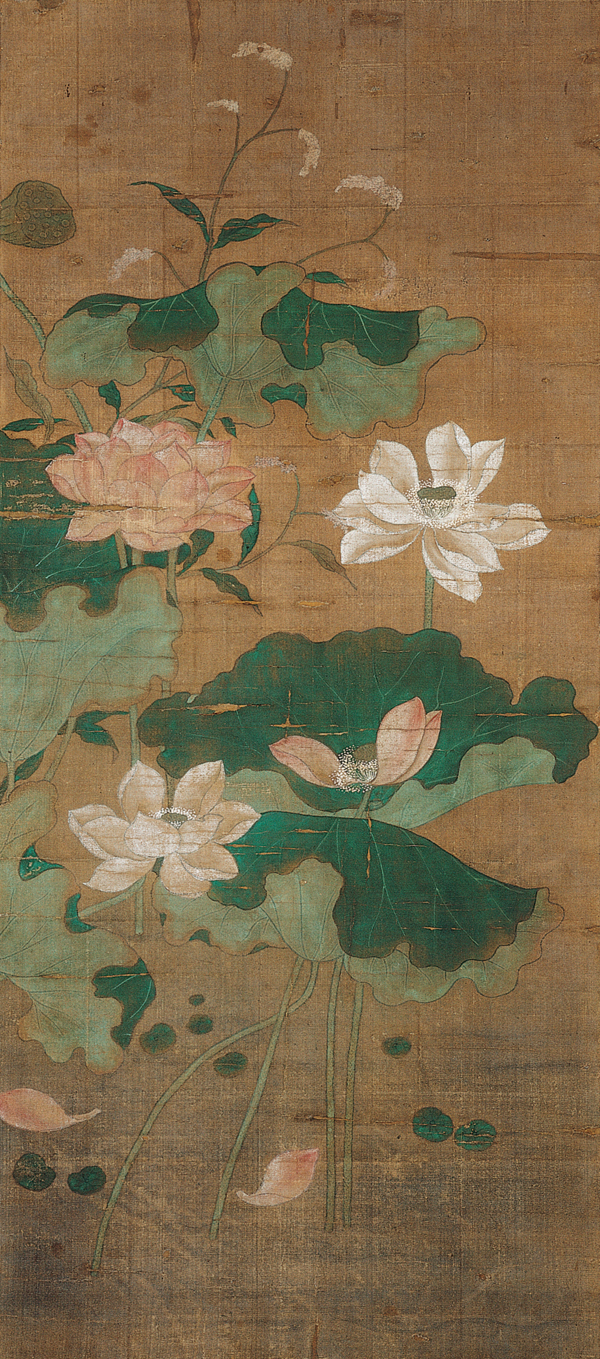
Pink and White Lotus, hanging scroll, 14th century China, Kimbell Art Museum

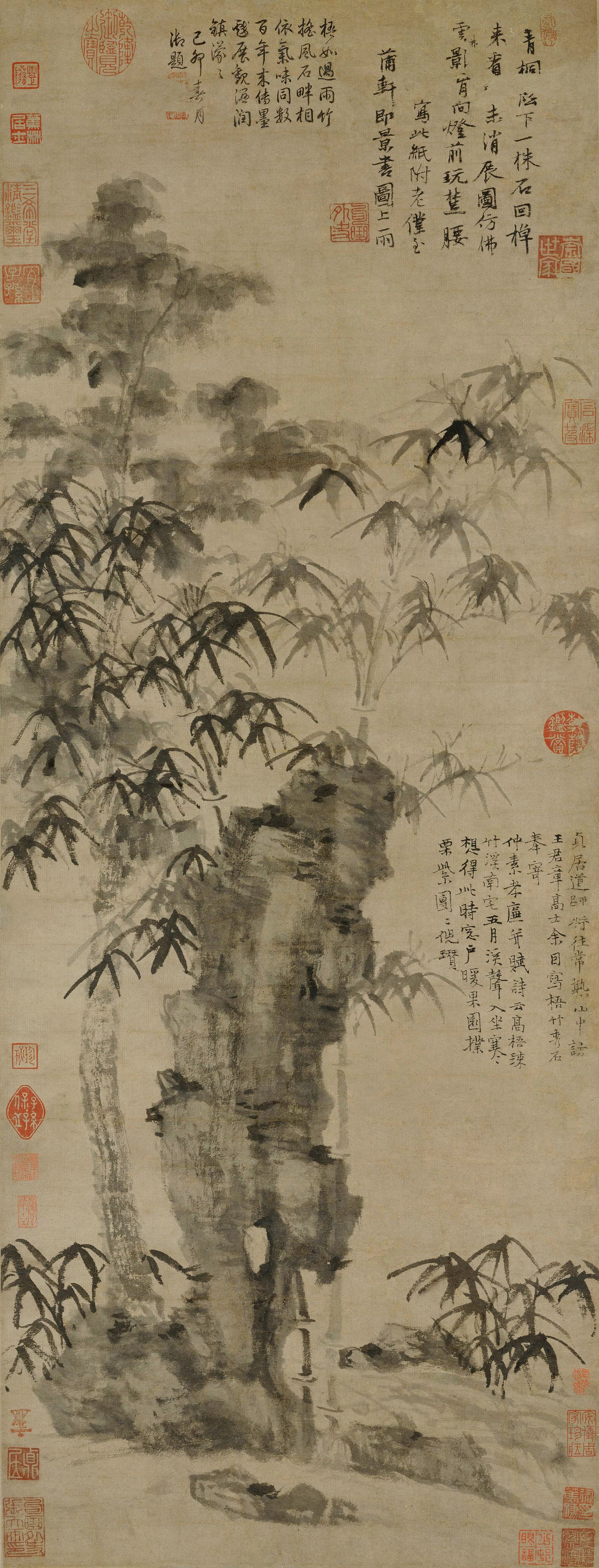
Wood, Bamboo, and Elegant Stone, Ni Zan, 1360s–1370s, Palace Museum

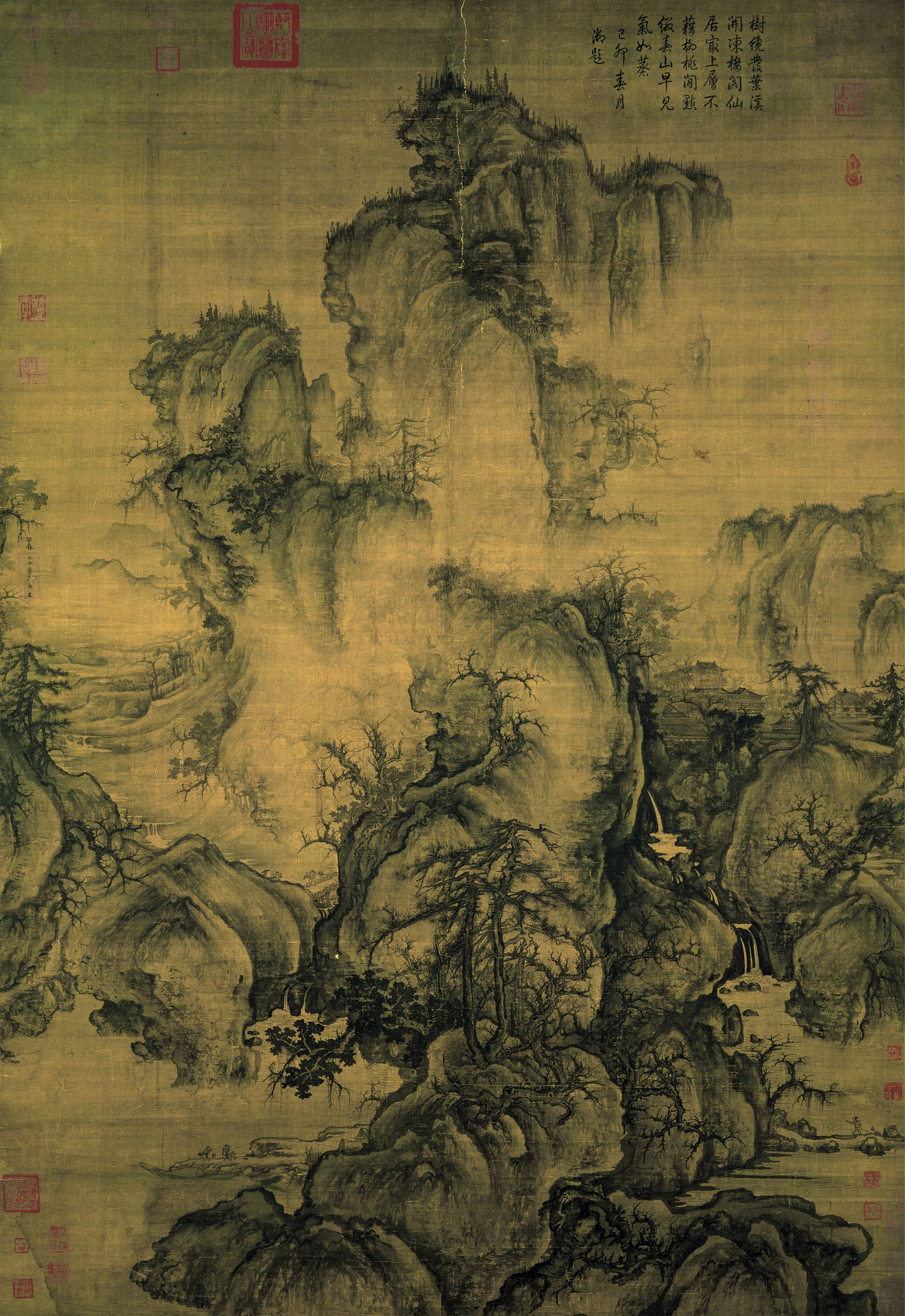
Early Spring, Guo Xi, color on silk, National Palace Museum, Taipei

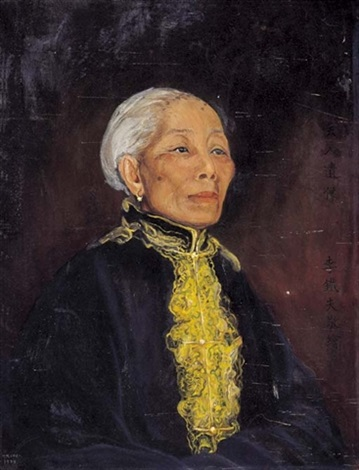
Portrait of Madame Liu, Li Tiefu, 1942, oil on canvas

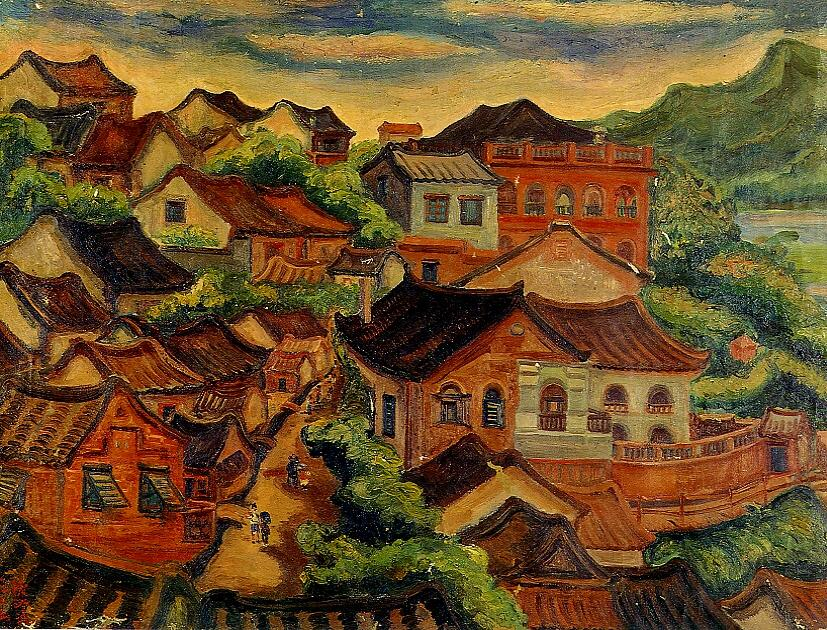
Chen Cheng-po, 1933, canvas oil painting, Collection of Taiwan Museum of Fine Art

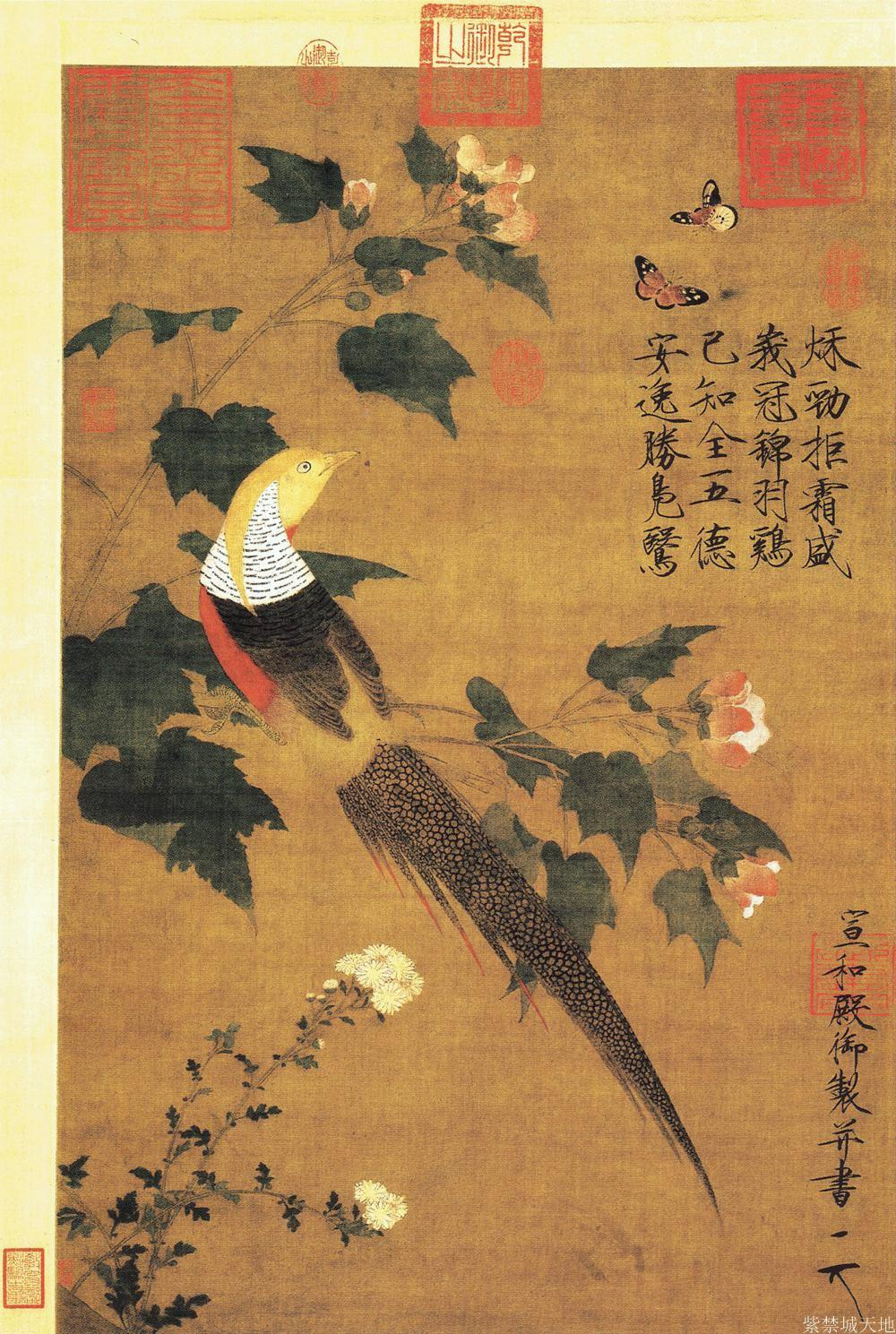
Golden pheasant and cotton rose, Zhao Ji, Palace Museum

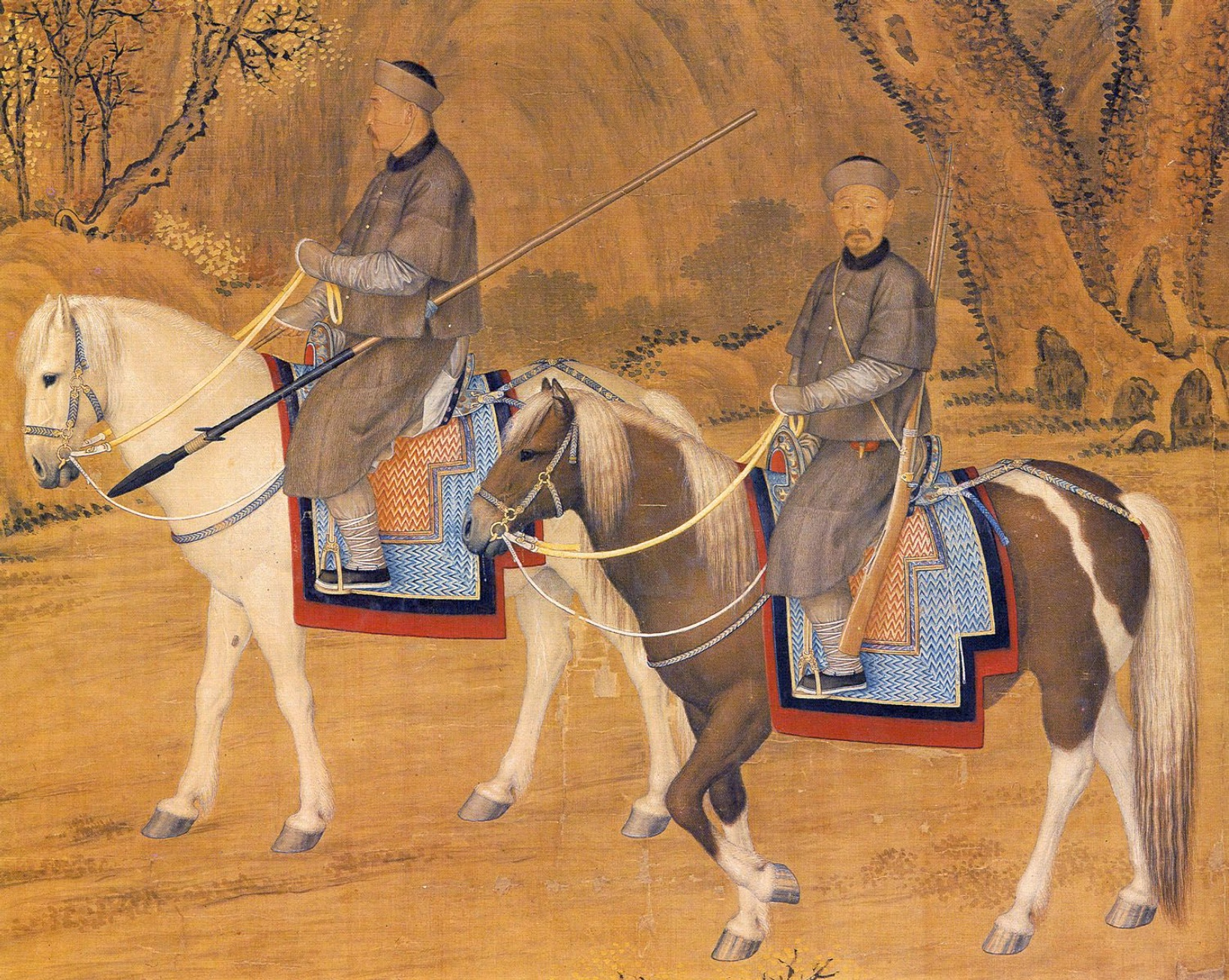
Portrait of the Emperor Troating for Deer, Giuseppe Castiglione, Palace Museum

== Photography ==
After the invention of photography in 1839 and the arrival of European photographers in Macao, photography was soon introduced in several cities in China. At first, some people were reluctant because they thought that having the camera take a picture of them would result in their spirit being taken away. But, by the end of the nineteenth century, all major cities had photographic studios. Some affluent Chinese people even adopted photography as a hobby. Western and Chinese photographers documented ordinary street life, major wars, and prominent figures.

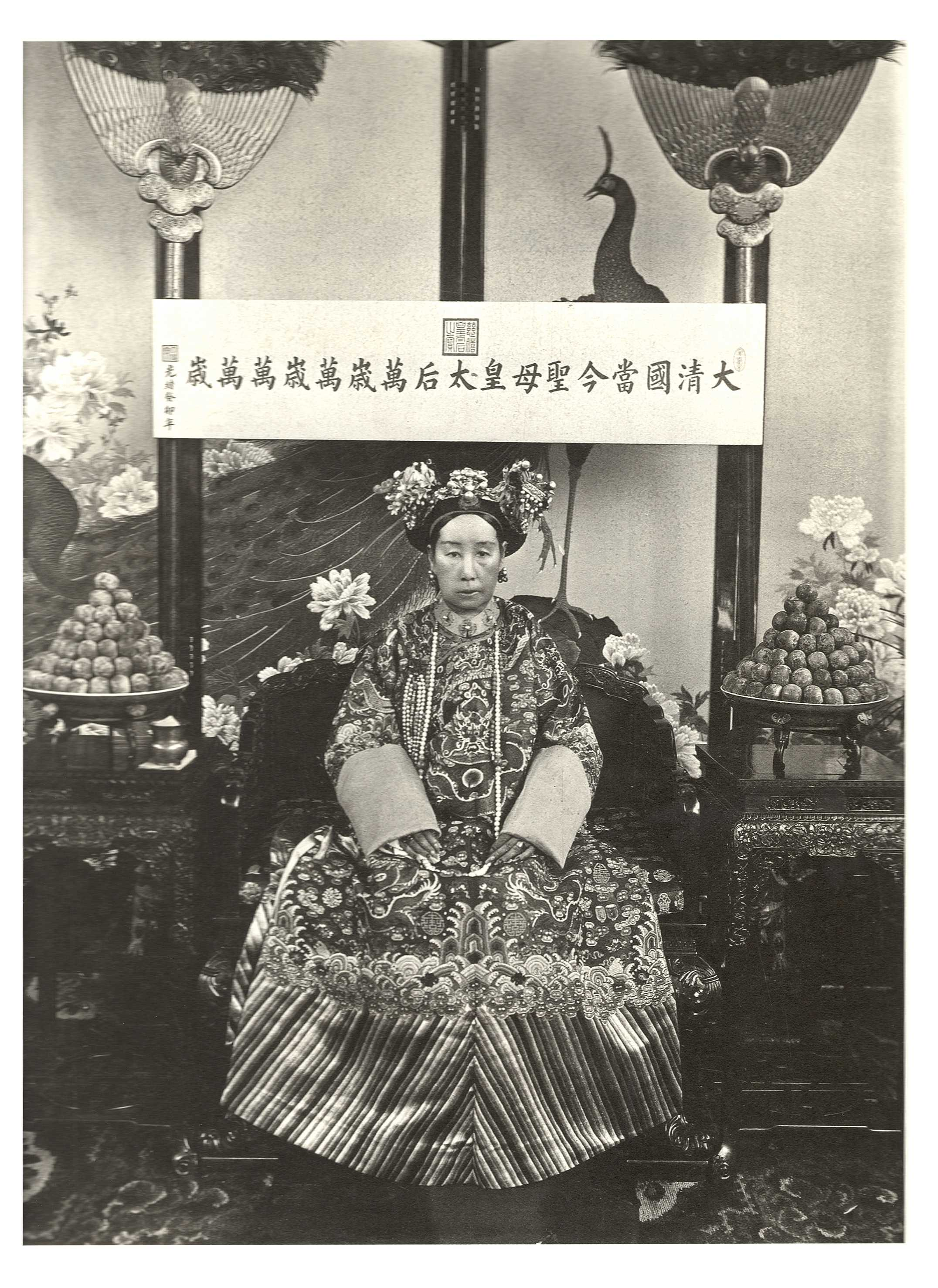
The Cixi Imperial Dowager Empress of China

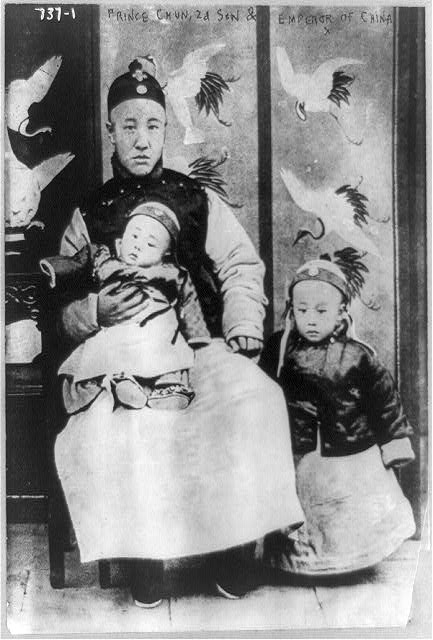
Three-year-old Emperor of China Pu Yi, February 23, 1909, Library of Congress

The Empress Dowager Cixi had her portrait taken repeatedly.

== Sculpture and carving ==
In the 18th century, a Qing dynasty covered vase depicting a woman holding a lingzhi fungus and a peony branch was created. The woman was also accompanied by a boy, a crane, and a deer as shown below.

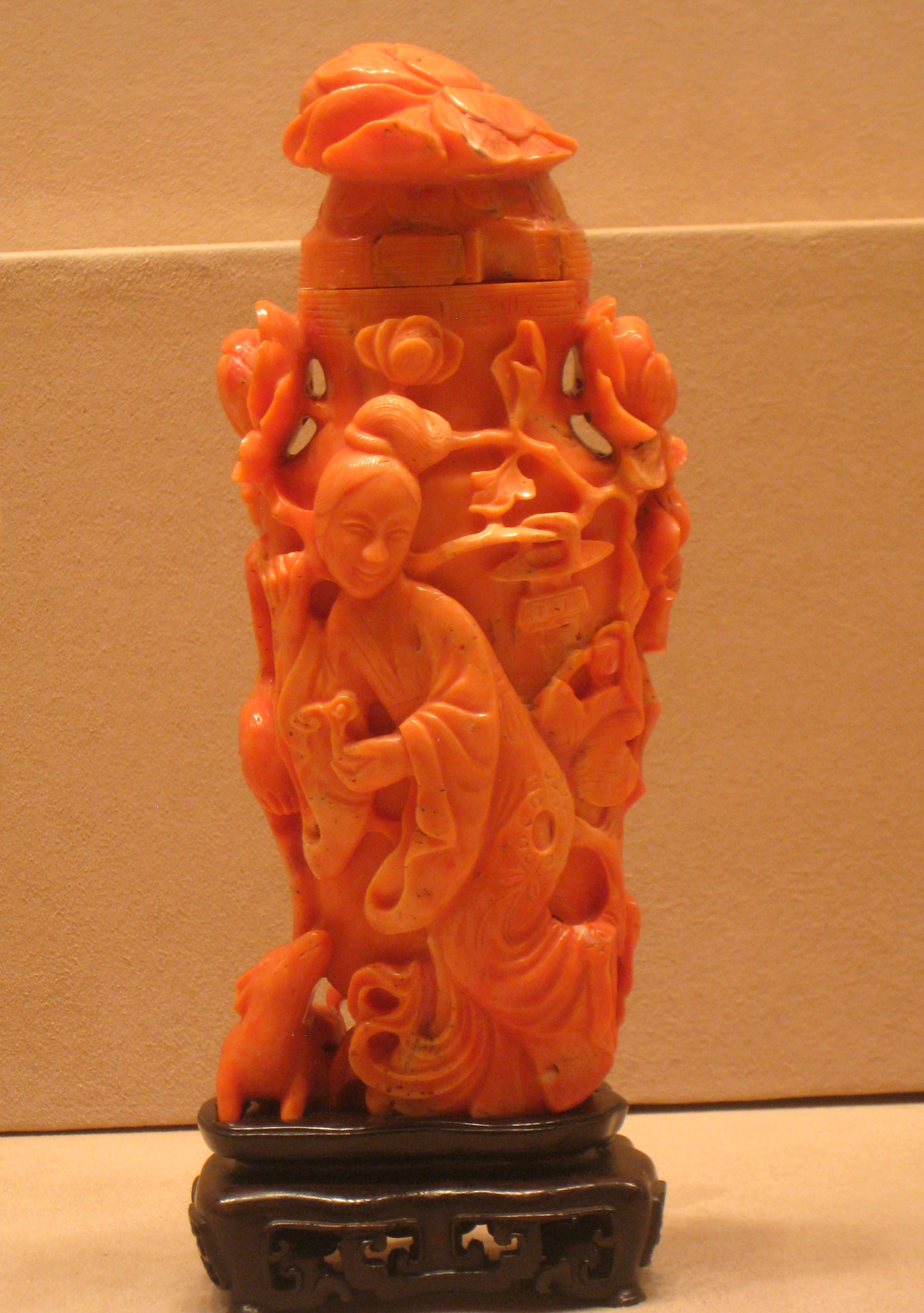
Covered Vase Decorated with Female Figure, Qing dynasty, 18th century, coral, Asian collection in the Worcester Art Museum, Worcester, Massachusetts

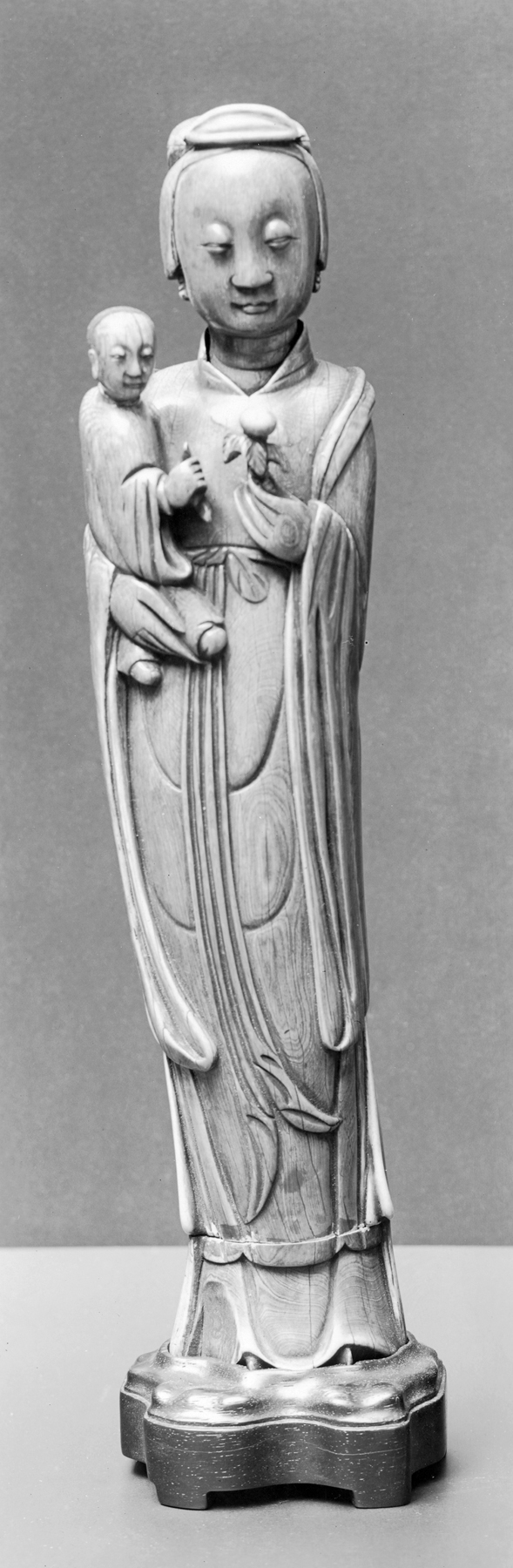
The Chinese goddess of compassion, Guanyin, between 1580 and 1644, carved ivory, Walters Art Museum

=== Ivory carving ===
Ivory was not a prestigious material in the rather strict hierarchy of Chinese art, where jade had always been far more highly regarded, and rhinoceros horn (which was not ivory) had a special auspicious meaning. But ivory, as well as bone, had been used for various items since early times when China still had its own species of elephant. Demand for ivory seems to have played a large part in their extinction, which came before 100 BC. During the Ming dynasty, ivory began to be used for small statuettes of gods and others (see gallery). In the Qing dynasty, it suited the growing taste for intricate carving and became more prominently used for brush-holders, boxes, handles and similar pieces. Later on, Canton even developed large models of houses and other large and showy pieces, which remained popular. Enormous examples are still seen as decorative centrepieces at government receptions. Figures were typically uncoloured, or just with certain features coloured in ink which was often just black, but sometimes a few other colors.

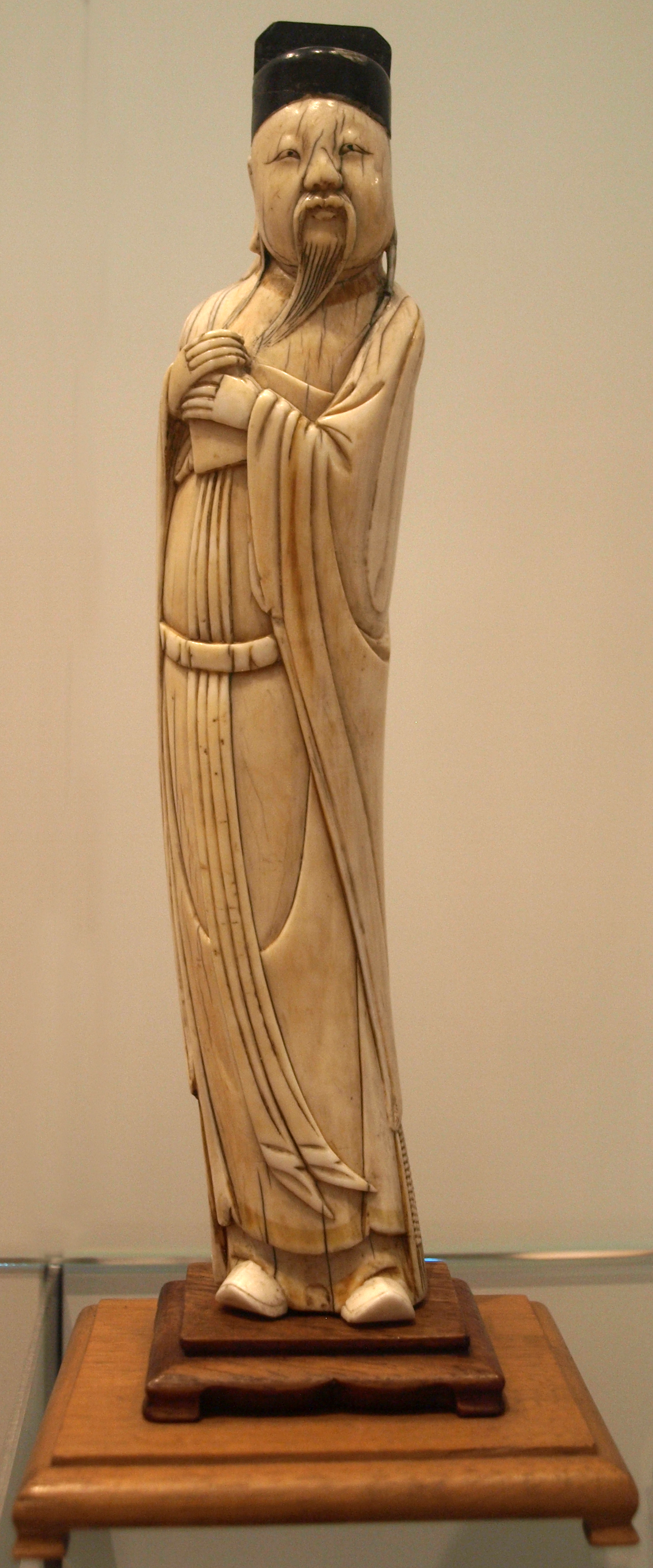
Ivory figurine of Wen Chang, the "God of Literature". Circa 1550–1644, Ming dynasty, Royal Ontario Museum.

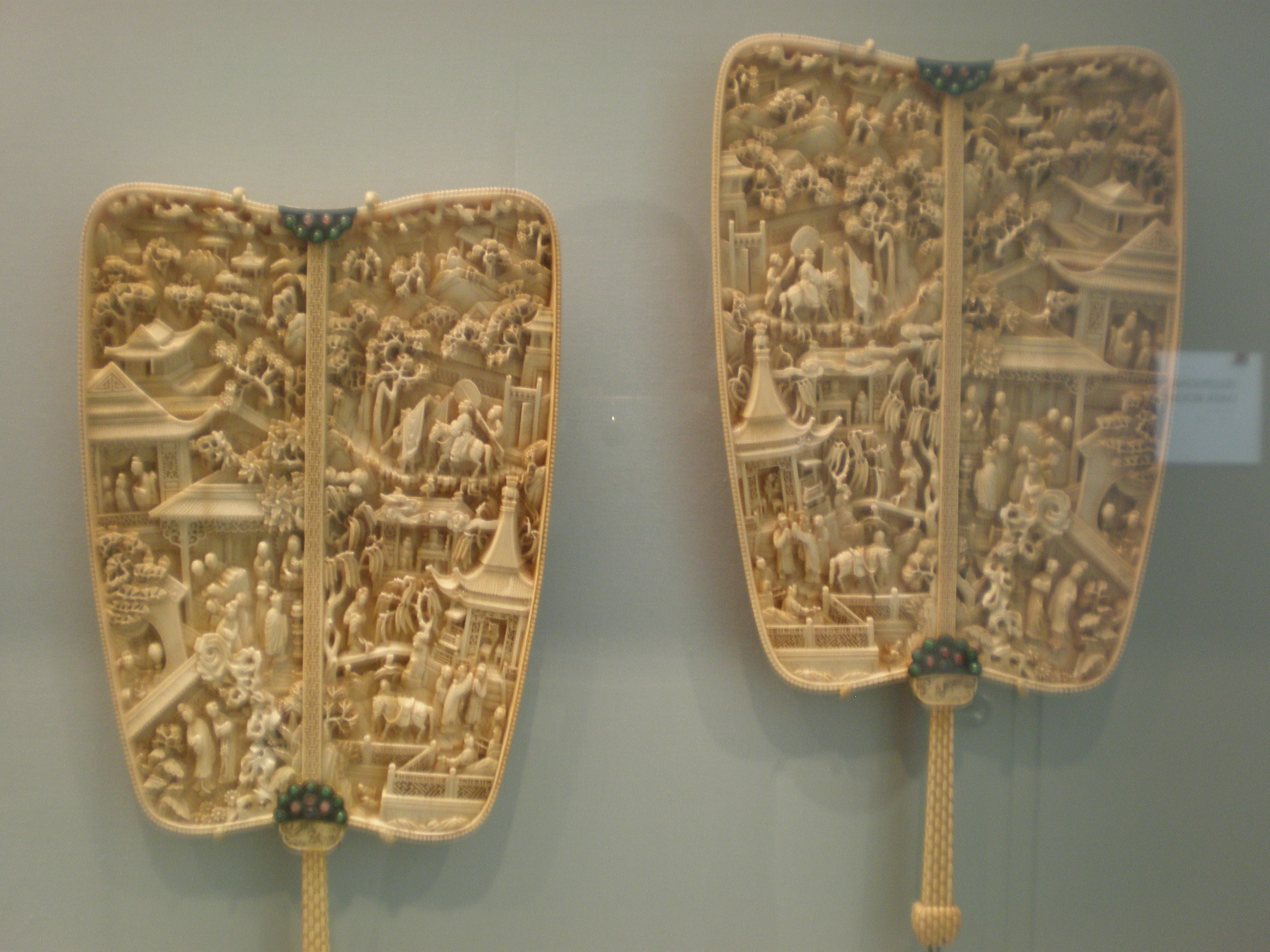
A pair of ivory fans depicting scenes from Romance of the Western Chamber, c. 1800–1911, Qing dynasty. On display at the Asian Art Museum in San Francisco, California.

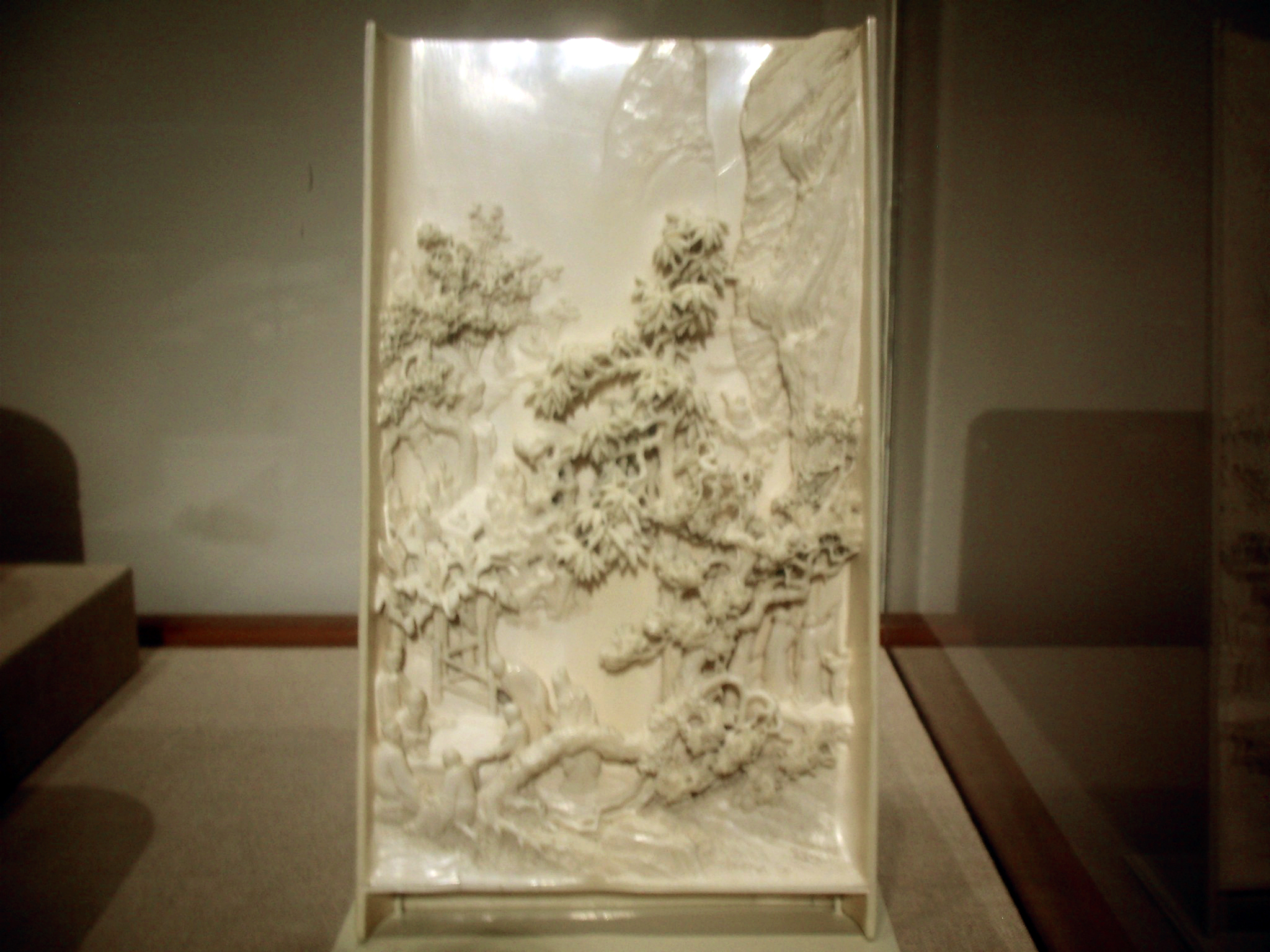
A Chinese ivory table screen with carved decoration of an outdoor scene, from the Qing dynasty, dated to the reign of the Qianlong Emperor (1735–1796).

=== Government seals ===
Seal knob (紐刻) is an art that originated in ancient China and is mainly popular in East Asian countries. It focuses or decorates on the head-part or the top-side of a seal. It is a kind of sculpture or mini-sculpture. In China, the utmost important seal of all is the imperial seal carved from the Heshibi, a sacred ceremonial jade. It was said that the green jade took the form of a round shape with inscriptions that read "Having received the Mandate from Heaven, may (the emperor) lead a long and prosperous life." (受命於天,既壽永昌) This was said to be written by the Primer Li Si for Qin Shi Huang Zhao Zheng, the Augustus Emperor of The Chinese Empire.

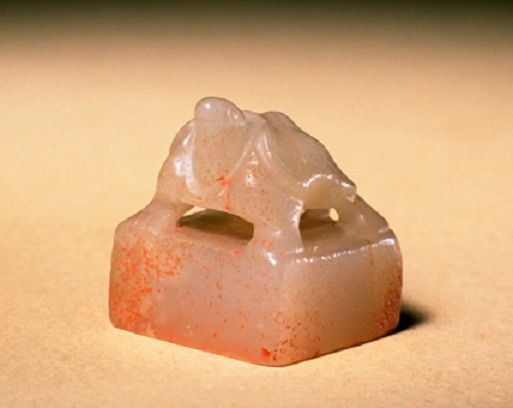
Knob of a governmental seal, Western Han dynasty.

=== Ruyi ===
Ruyi is a scepter that serves primarily as a decoration. Its history began in the Qing dynasty when Ruyi scepters were given to noted visitors of the emperor. Now, they're given as birthday presents. Ruyi is made of different materials, including porcelain and jade. The term Ruyi means "may your wish be granted" or "as you wish". The unusual shape is meant to imitate the shape of a stemmed lotus flower.

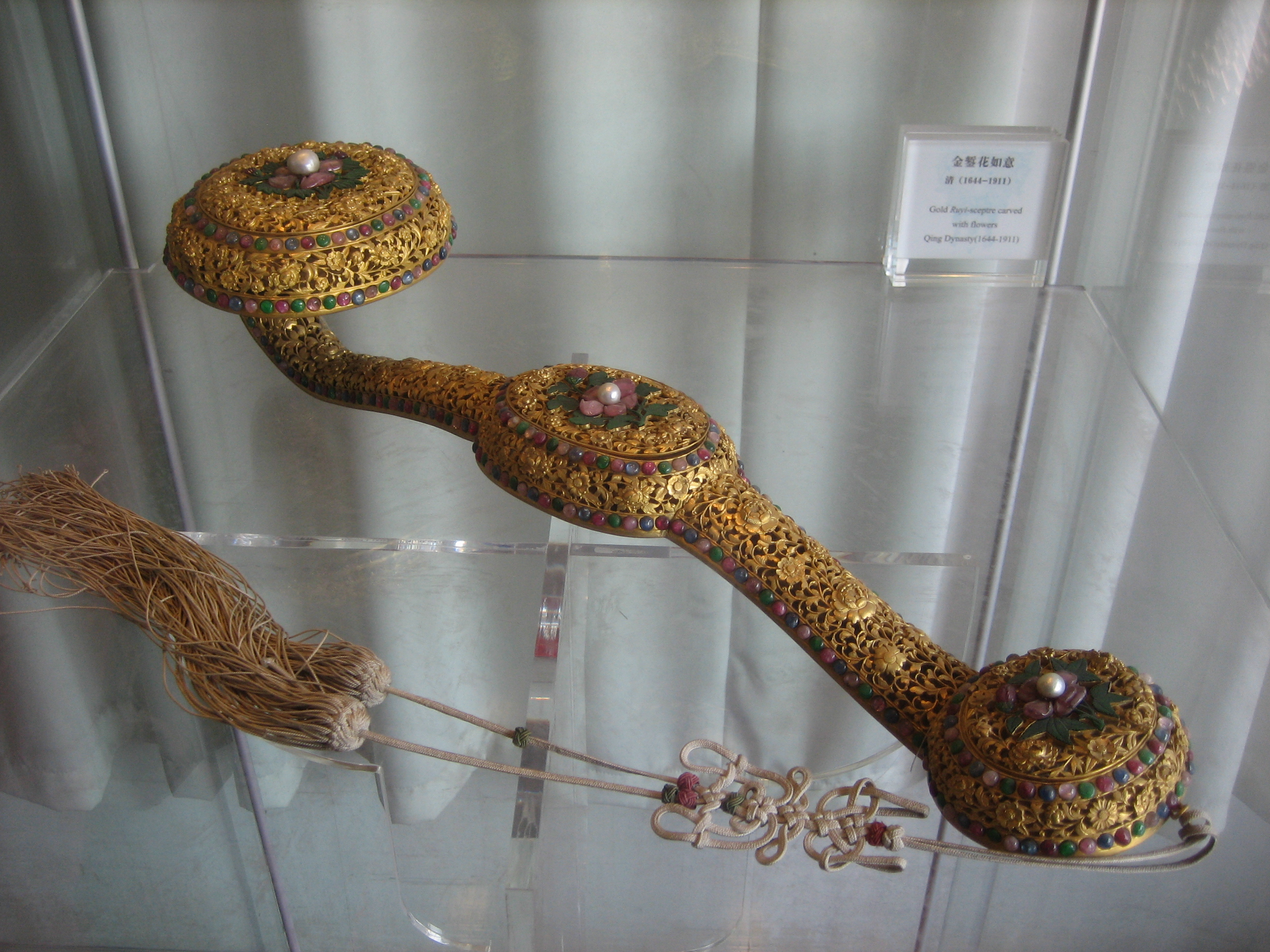
A gold ruyi carved with flowers. Qing dynasty (1644–1911). Palace Museum, Beijing.

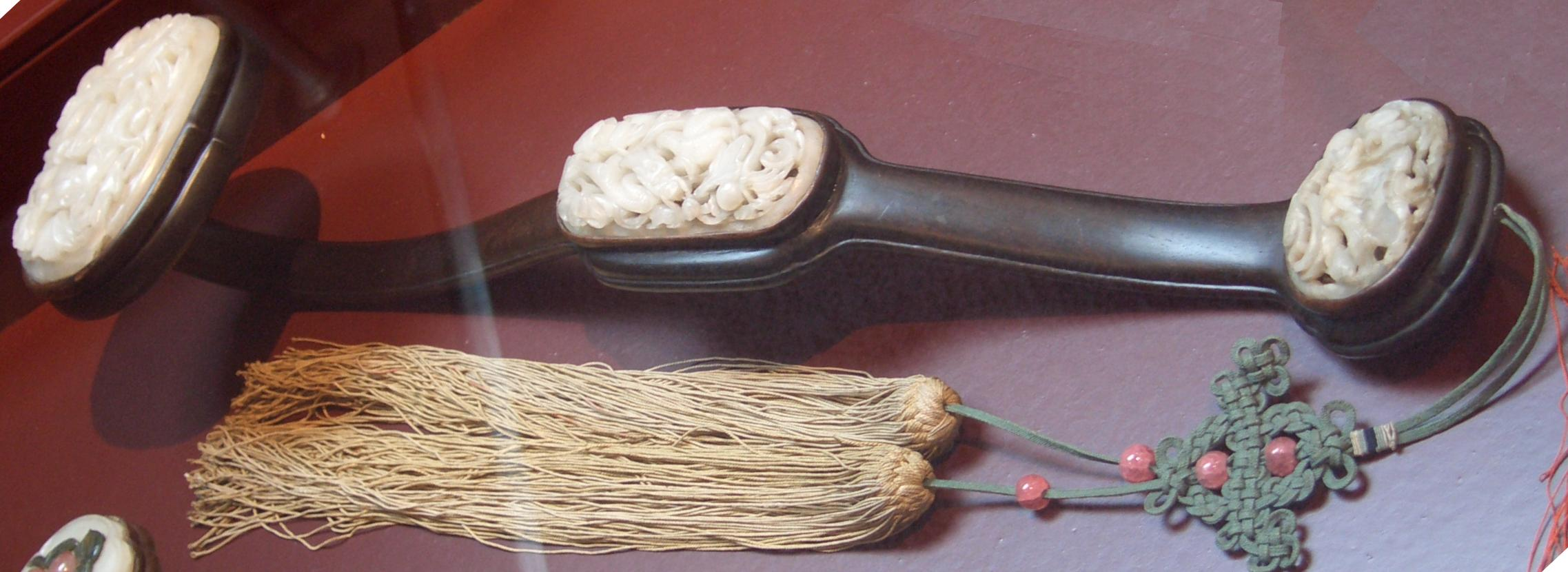
Ruyi scepter, Qing dynasty, 18th century, Uberseemuseum, Bremen, Germany

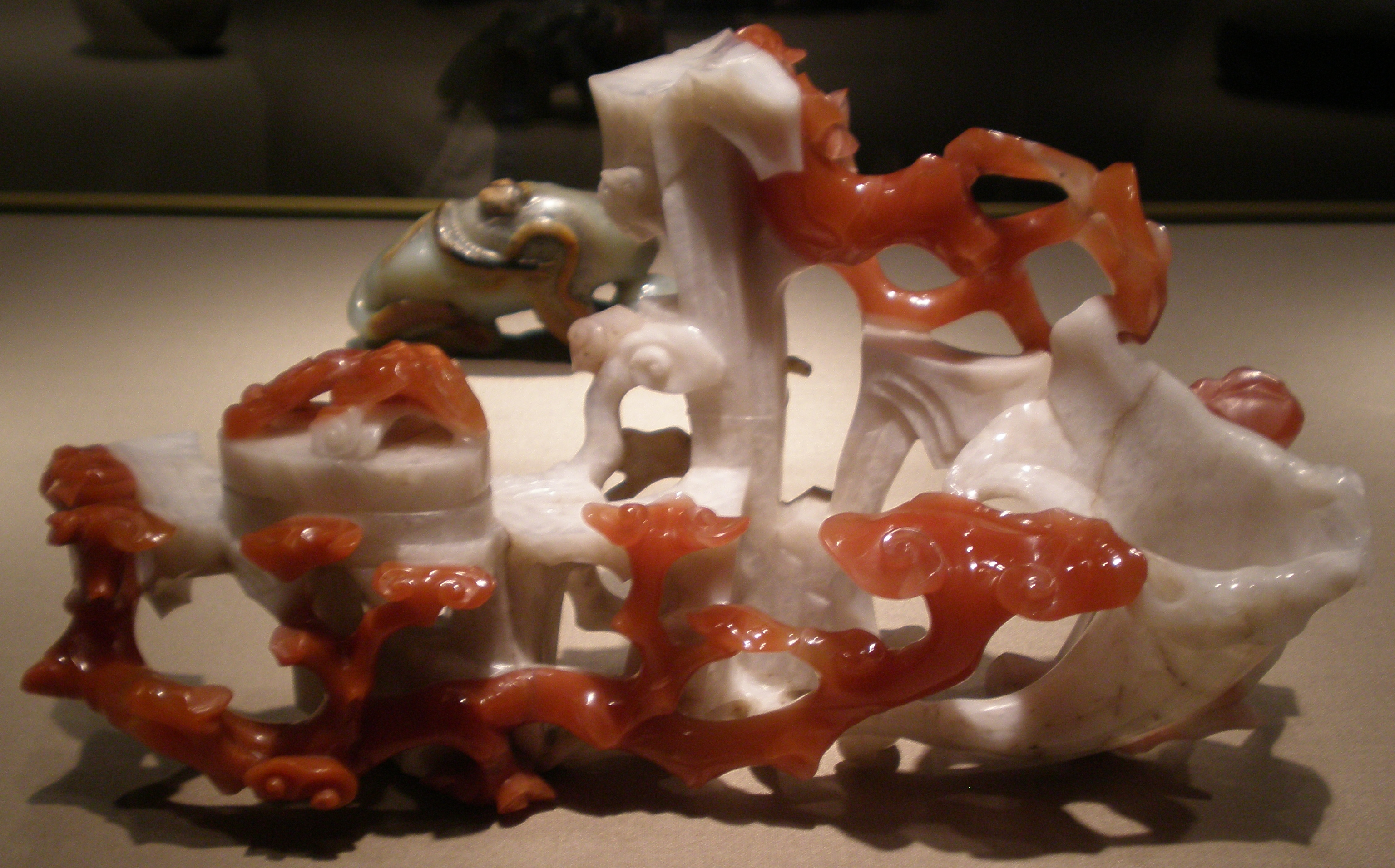
Ornament with persimmon, lily and ruyi fungus, chalcedony, 1900–49, Qing dynasty or Republic period. On display at the Asian Art Museum of San Francisco.

=== Stone carving ===
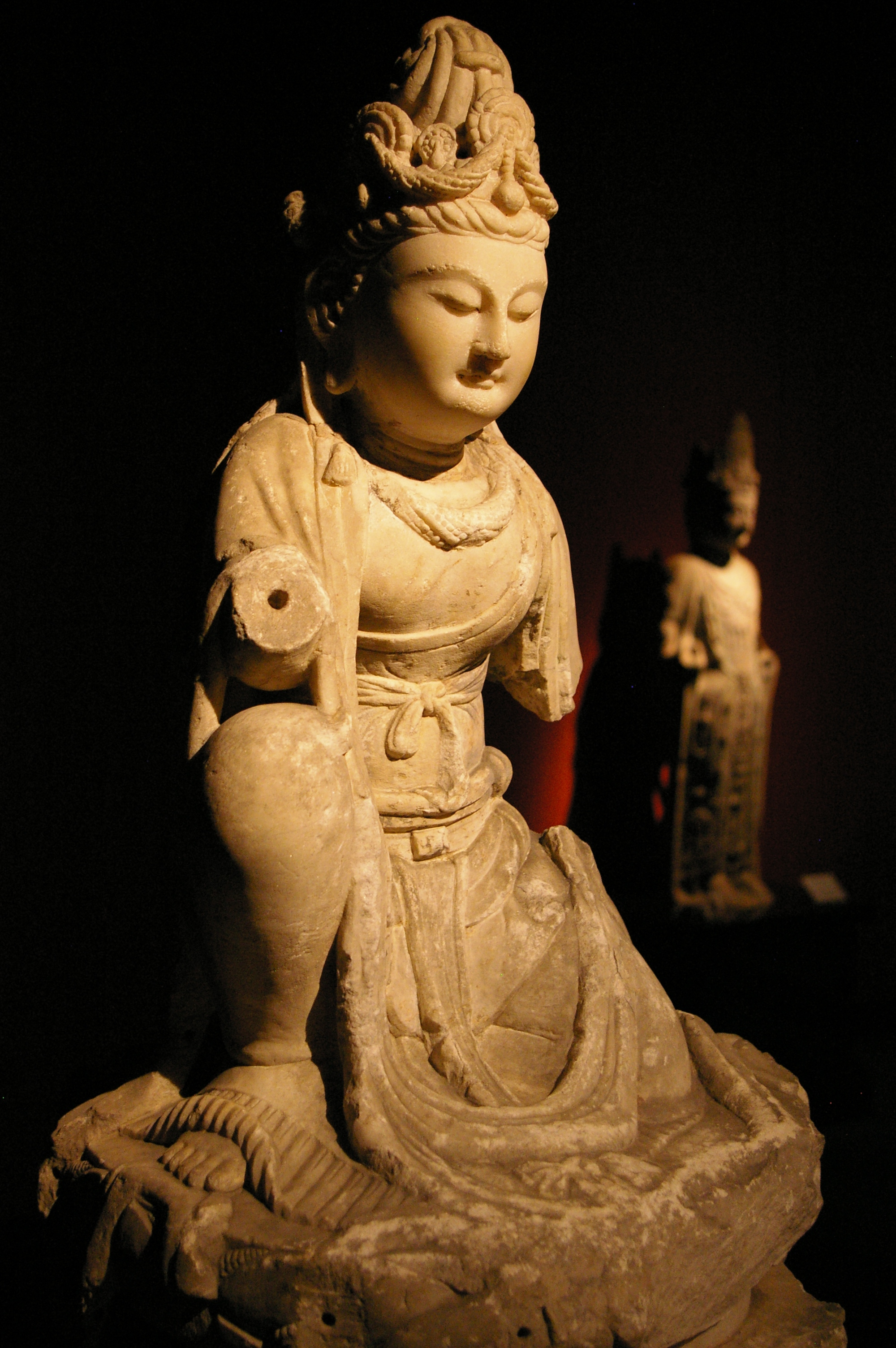
Buddha statue, Tang dynasty (618–907 AD), Shanghai Museum

=== Woodwork ===
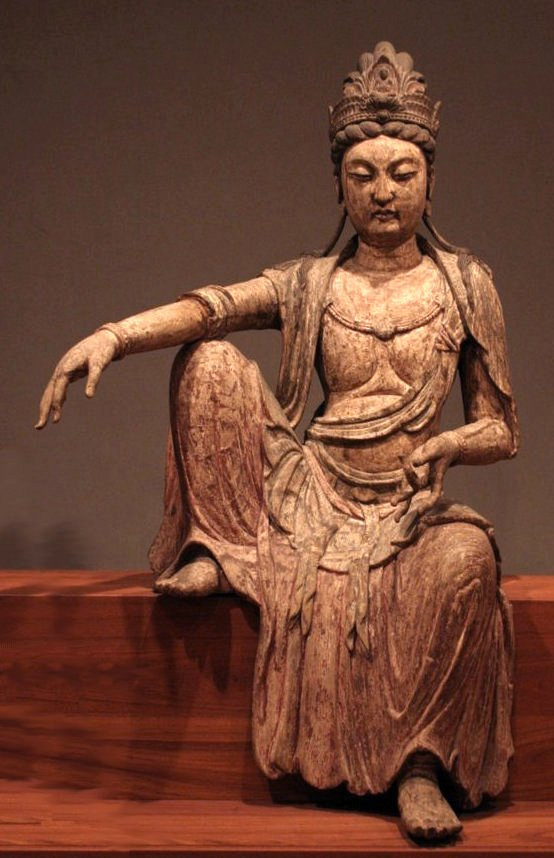
Kuan-yan bodhisattva, Northern Sung dynasty, China, c. 1025, wood, Honolulu Academy of Arts

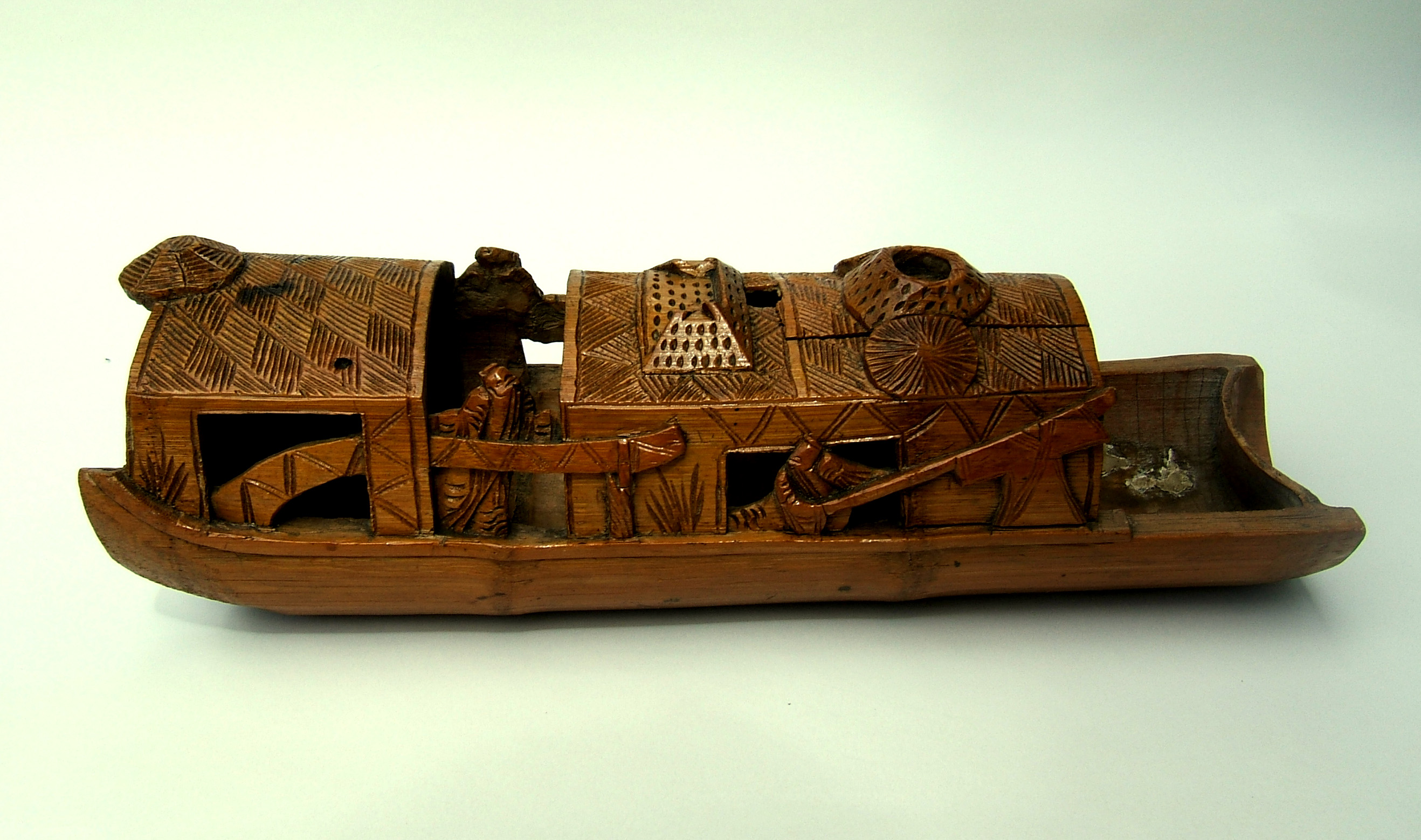
Chinese bamboo carving, Qing dynasty, c.1900

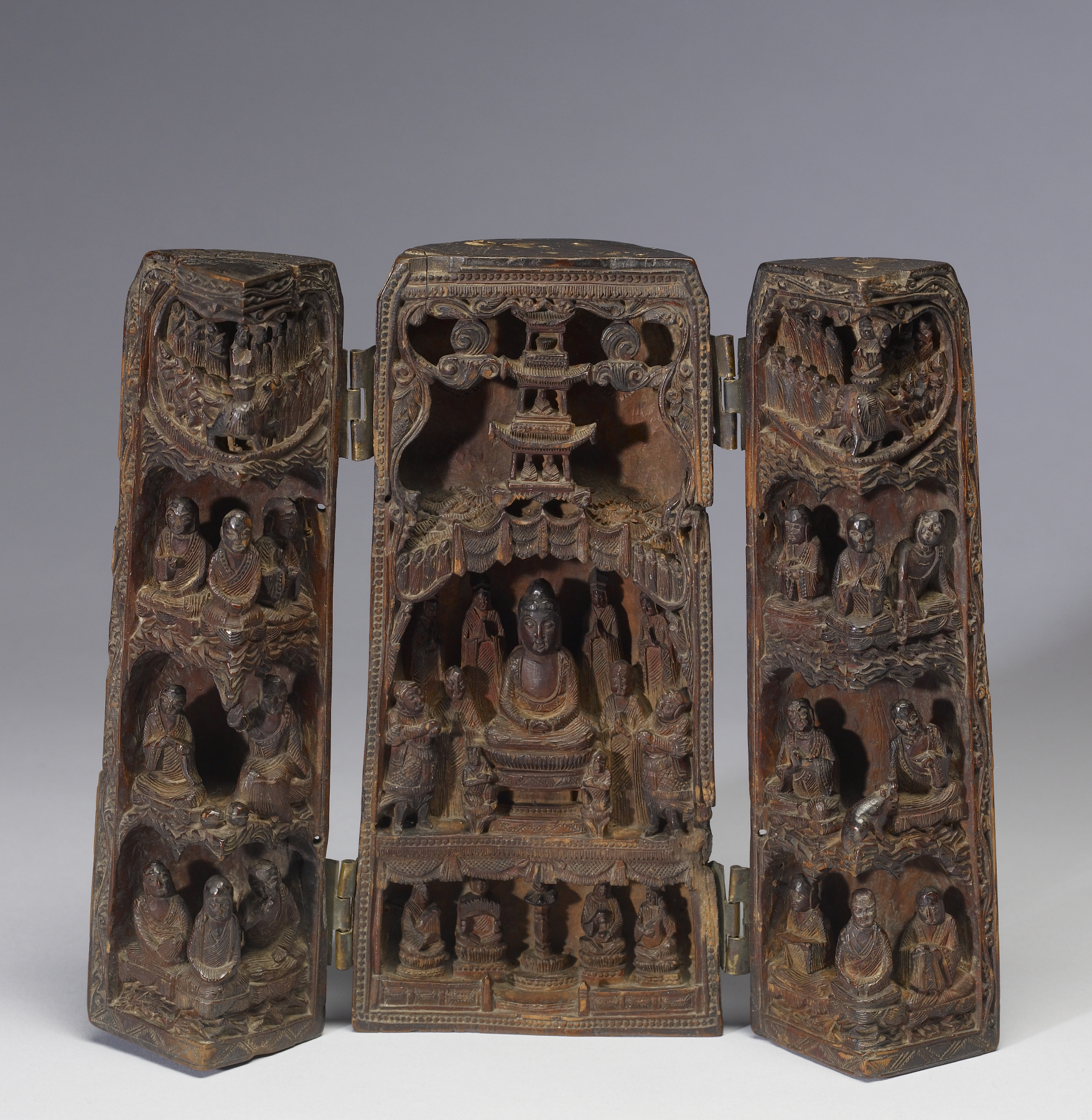
Portable Buddhist Shrine, 10th century, carved wood, Walters Art Museum

== Textile arts ==
=== Embroidery ===
Chinese embroidery is one of the oldest extant needlework. The four major regional styles of Chinese embroidery are Suzhou (Su Xiu), Hunan (Xiang Xiu), Guangdong (Yue Xiu) and Sichuan (Shu Xiu). All of them are nominated as Chinese Intangible Cultural Heritage.

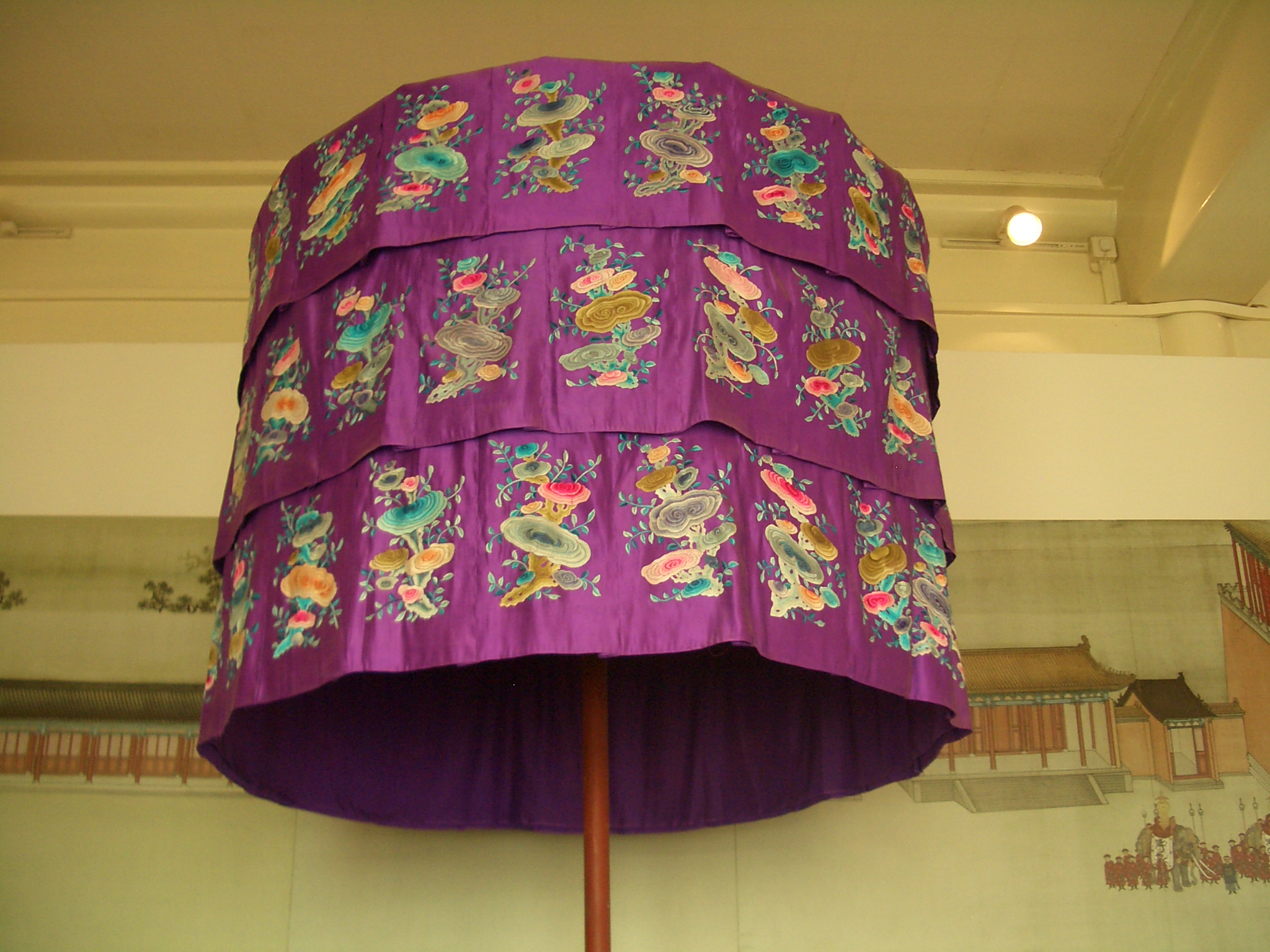
Qing dynasty purple canopy with a magic fungi design, Museum gallery, Beijing's Palace Museum

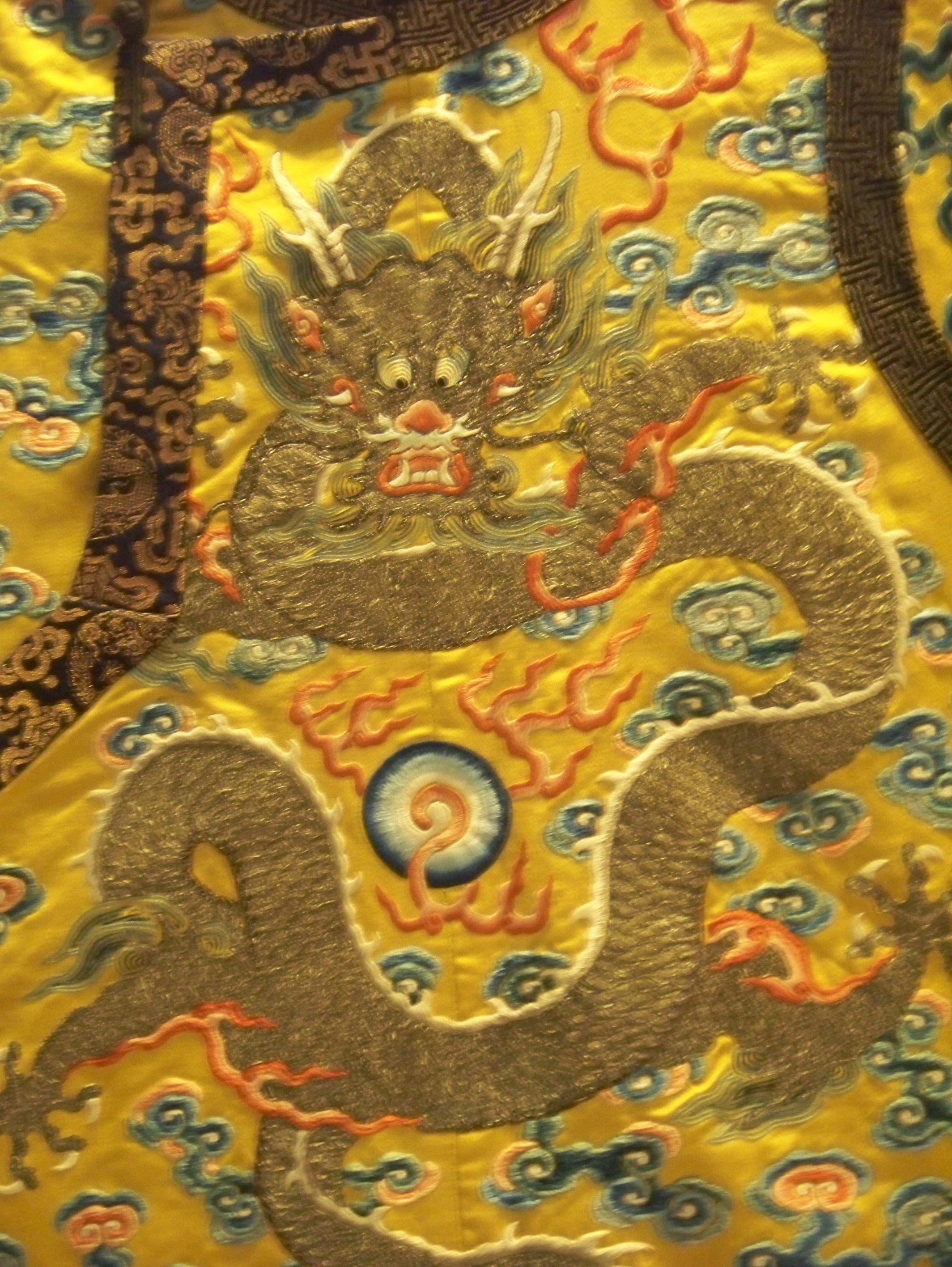
Embroidered silk, 1770–1820, Qing dynasty

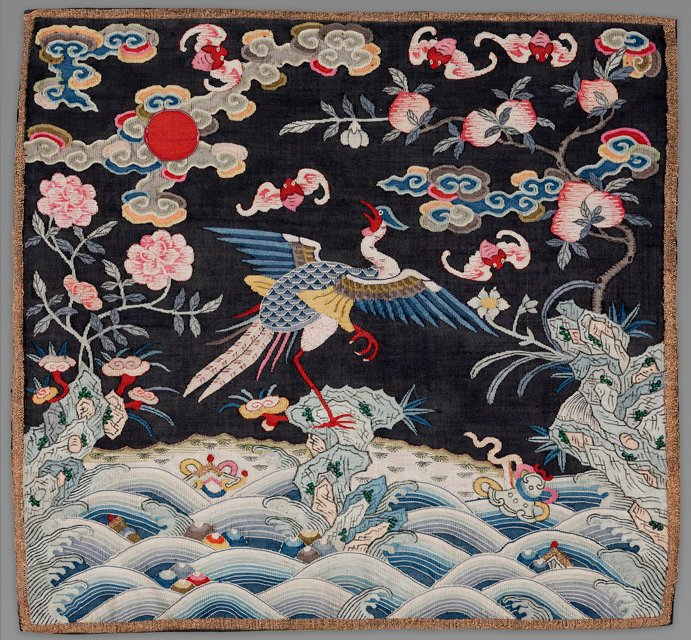
Golden pheasant rank badge, 2nd rank civil servant, silk tapestry with painted details. China, Qing dynasty, late 18th – early 19th century. Denver Art Museum

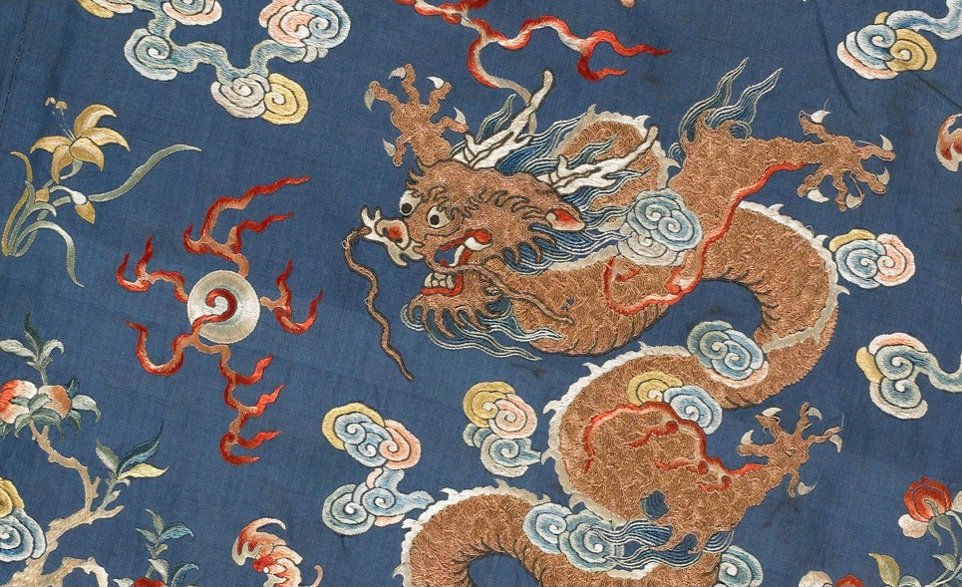
Detail of qifu (imperial dragon robe), late 19th or early 20th century, silk, gilt thread, twill and damask weave, embroidery, Honolulu Academy of Arts

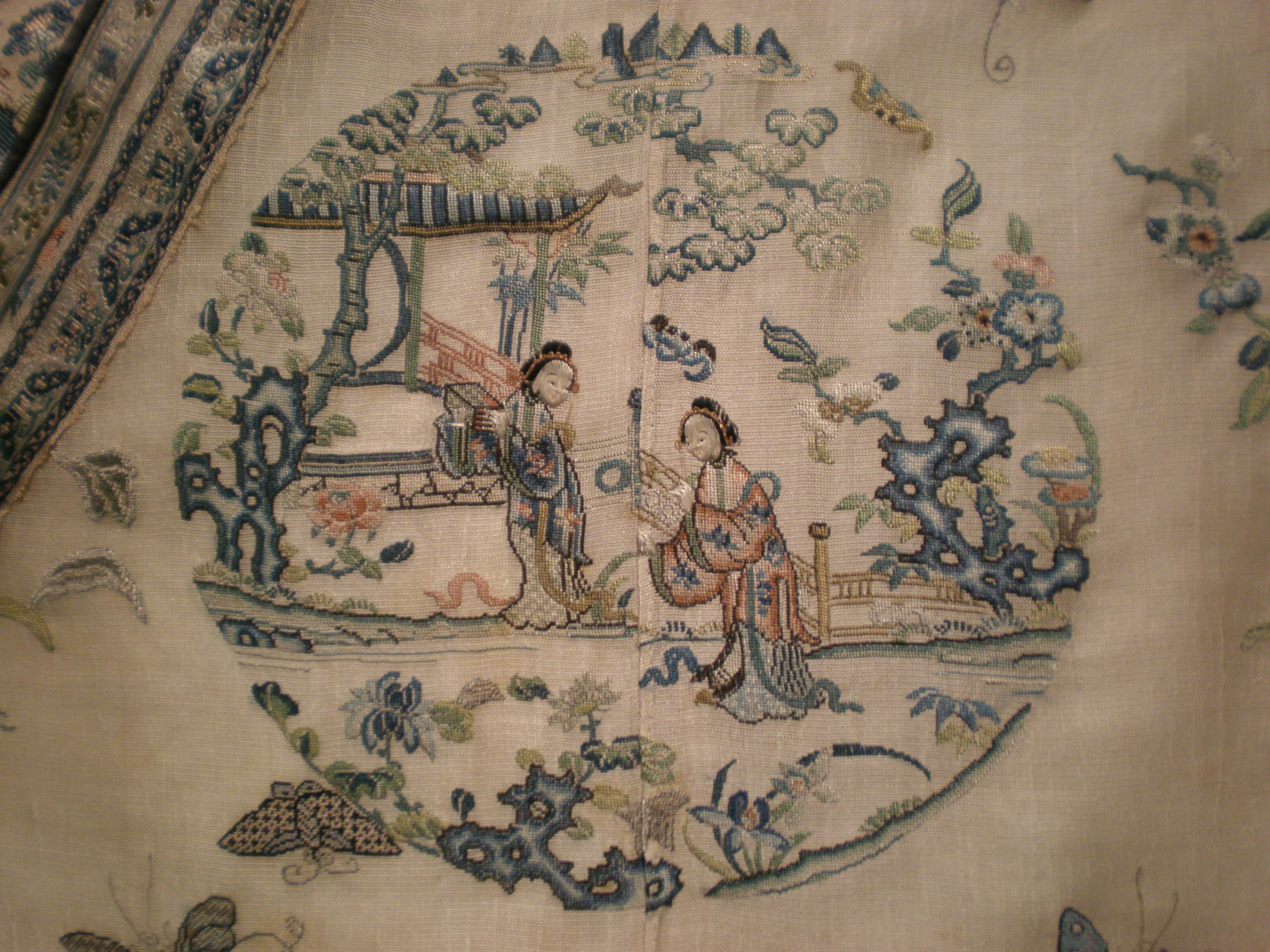
Detail of the central embroidery work of a woman's summer robe, silk gauze, c. 1875–1900, Qing dynasty. On display at the Asian Art Museum of San Francisco.

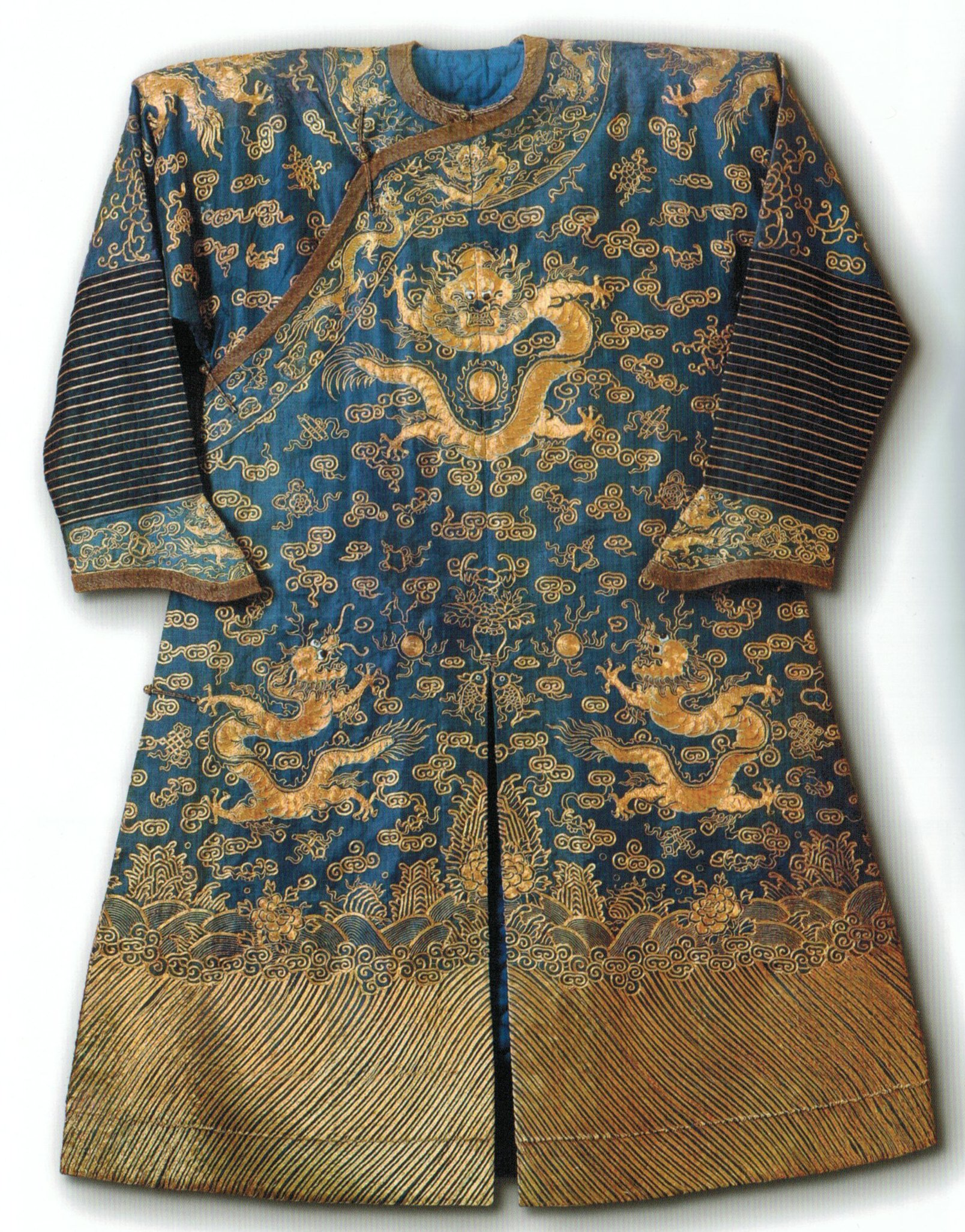
Chinese summer court robe ("dragon robe"), c. 1890s, silk gauze couched in gold thread, East-West Center

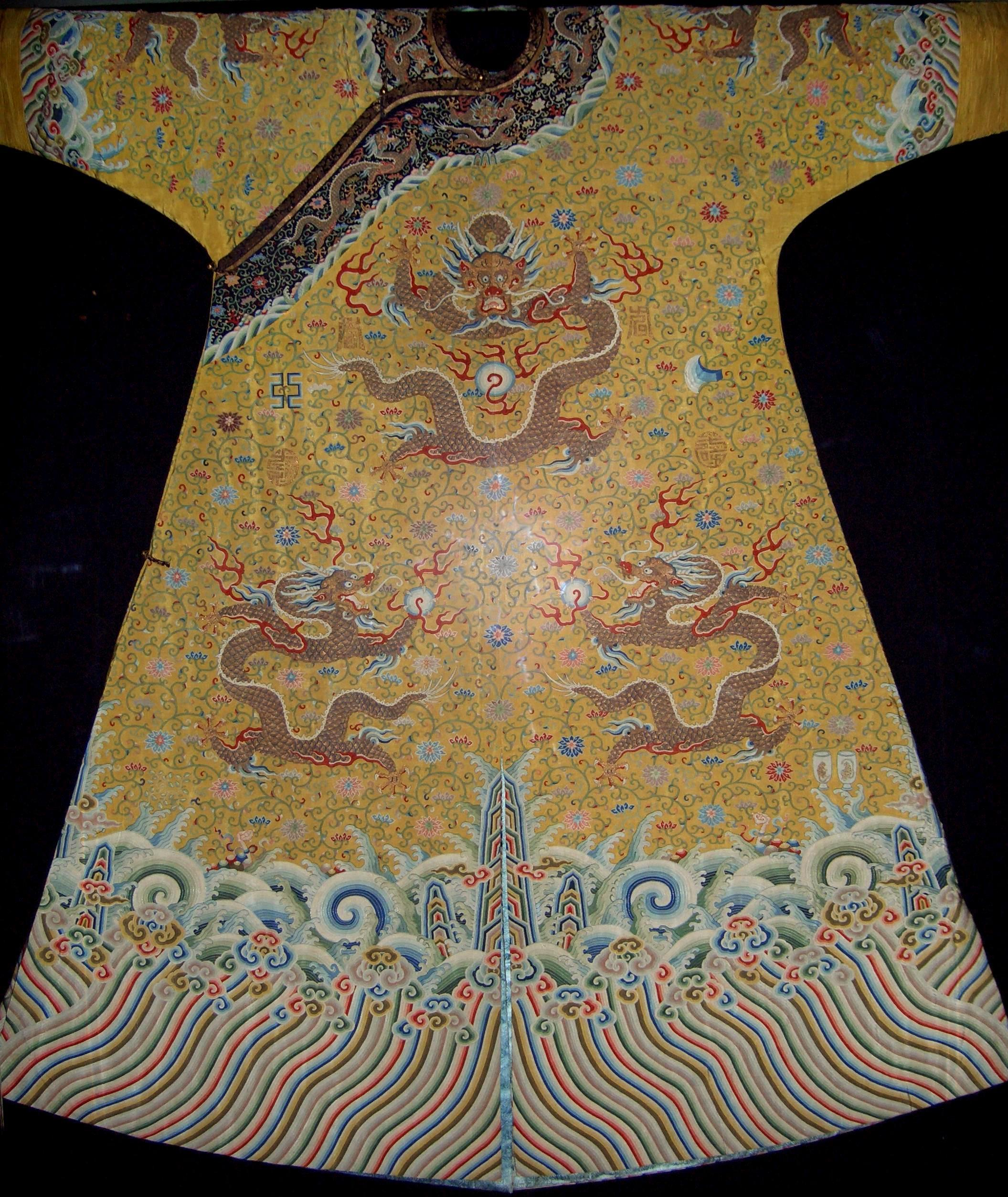
Dragon robe of the Qianlong Emperor (1736–1796), 18th century, Grassi Museum, Leipzig, Germany

=== Rugs ===
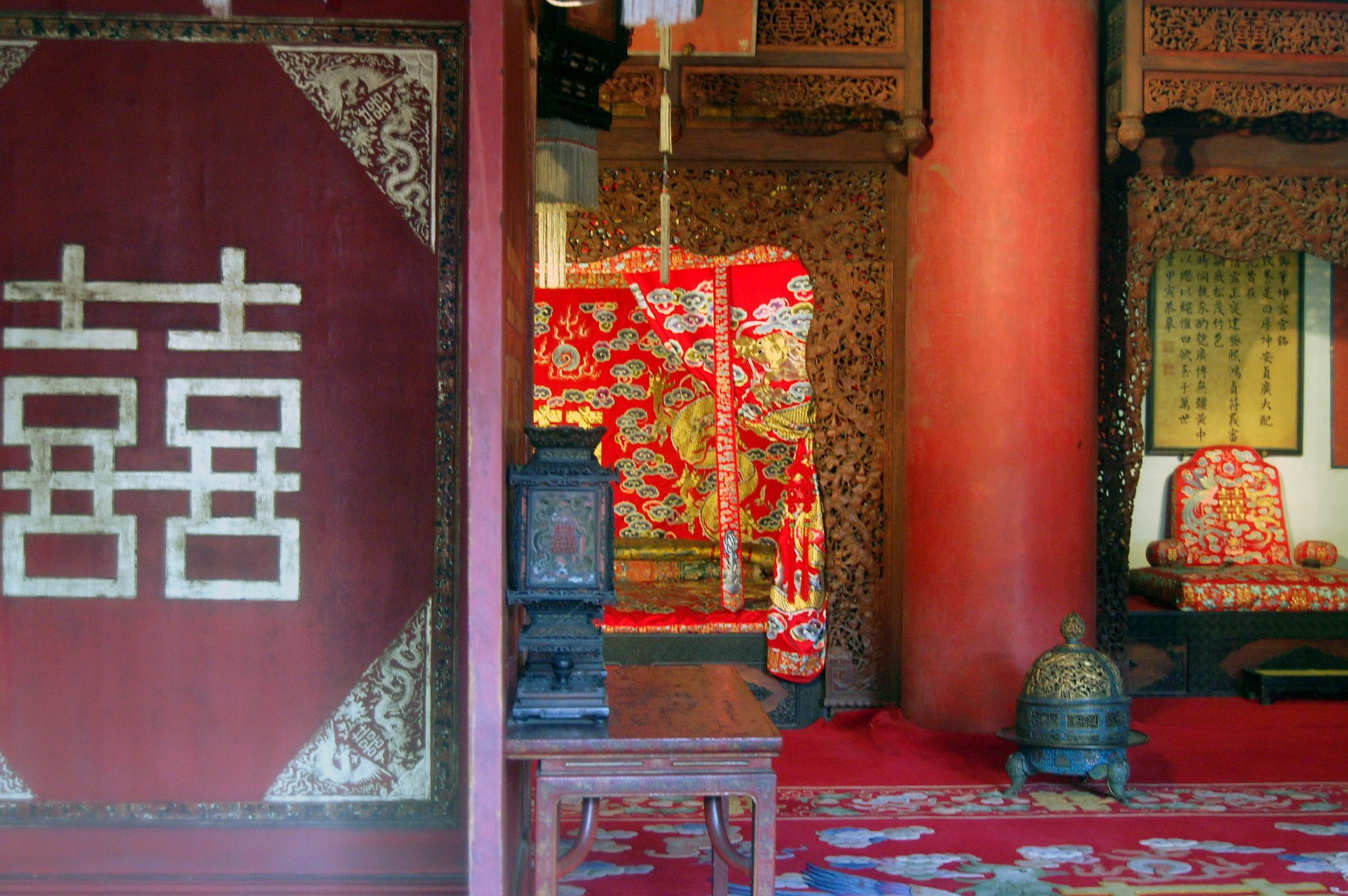
A room with traditional Chinese wedding decorations and rugs, Forbidden City in Beijing

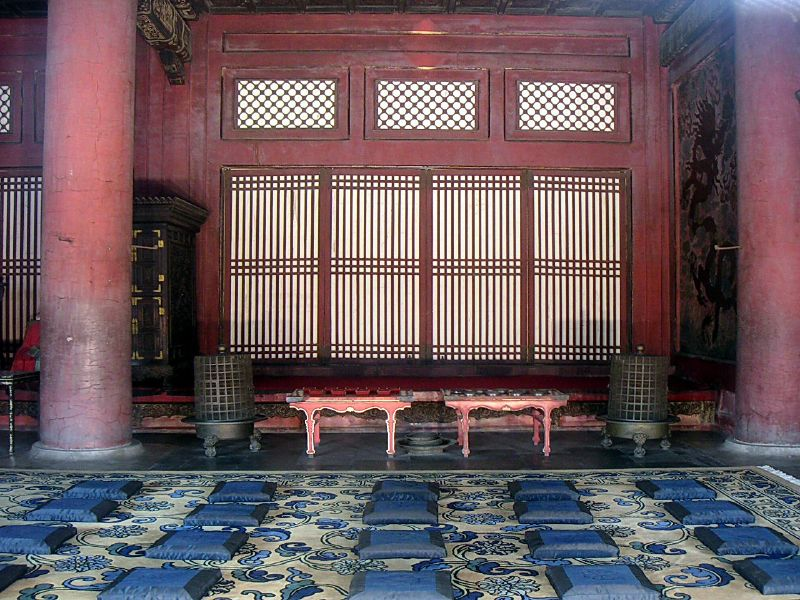
A room with blue patterned carpet and hanging dragon rug, Forbidden City, Beijing

=== Woven material ===
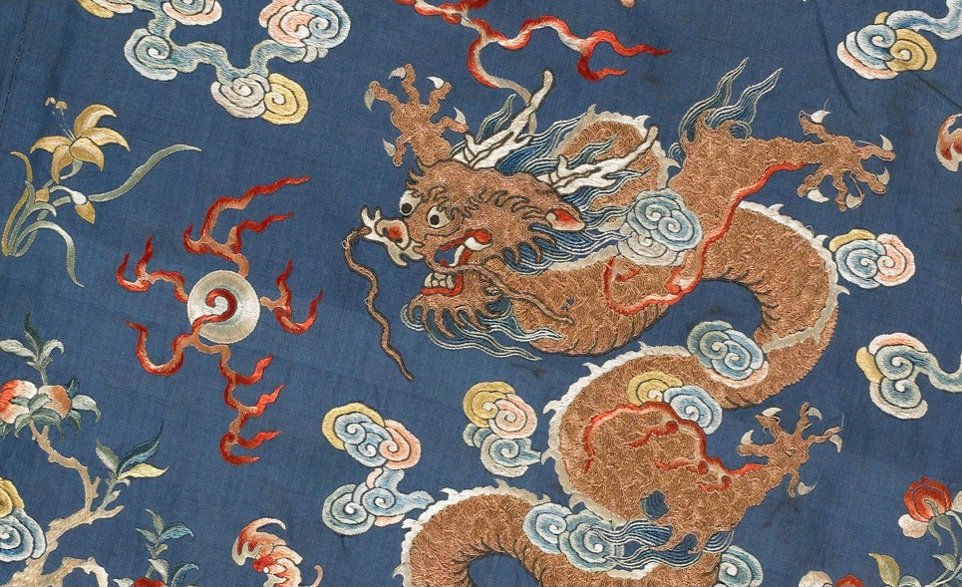
Detail of qifu (imperial dragon robe), late 19th or early 20th century, silk, gilt thread, twill and damask weave, embroidery, Honolulu Academy of Arts

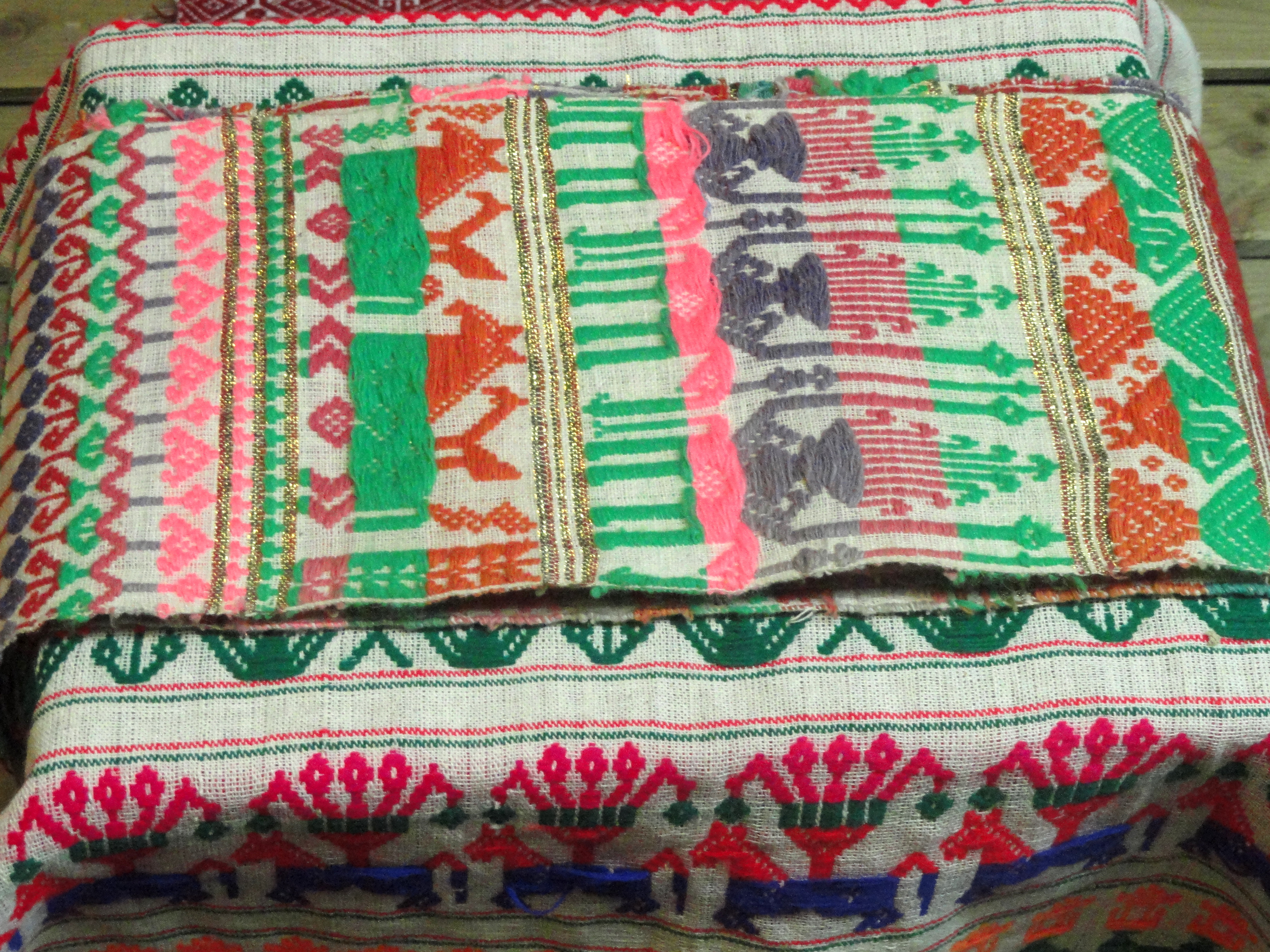
Dai woven textile, weaving collection, Yunnan Nationalities Museum, Kunming, Yunnan, China.

== See also ==
- Academies
  - China Academy of Art
  - China Central Academy of Fine Arts
  - Hubei Institute of Fine Arts
- Chinese architecture
- Chinese Folk Art
- Chinese furniture
- Chinese garden
- Collections of fine art in China
  - National Art Museum of China
  - National Museum of China
  - National Palace Museum, Taipei
  - Forbidden City (Palace Museum)
  - Summer Palace, Beijing

== Bibliography ==
- Chang, Zonglin. Li, Xukui. (2006). Aspect of Chinese culture. 中国文化导读. 清华大学出版社 publishing
- Institute of the History of Natural Sciences and Chinese Academy of Sciences, ed. (1983). Ancient China's technology and science. Beijing: Foreign Languages Press. ISBN 978-0-8351-1001-3.
- Rawson, Jessica (ed). (2007). The British Museum Book of Chinese Art, (2nd edn). British Museum Press. ISBN 978-0-7141-2446-9
- Stark, Miriam T. (2005). Archaeology of Asia. Malden, MA : Blackwell Pub. ISBN 1-4051-0213-6.
- Wang, Zhongshu. (1982). Han Civilization. Translated by K.C. Chang and Collaborators. New Haven and London: Yale University Press. ISBN 0-300-02723-0.
- Webb, Marianne (2000). Lacquer: Technology and conservation. Oxford: Butterworth-Heinemann. ISBN 978-0-7506-4412-9.
