= Sugar sculpture =

Decorative sugar craft

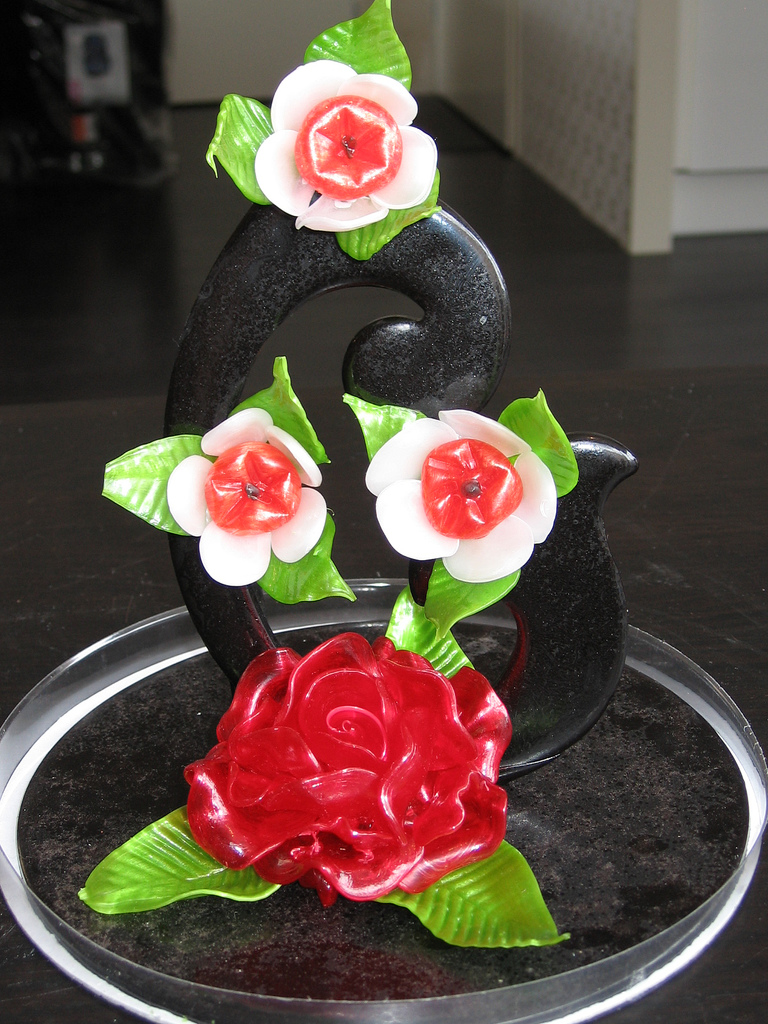
Roses and leaves made from pulled sugar

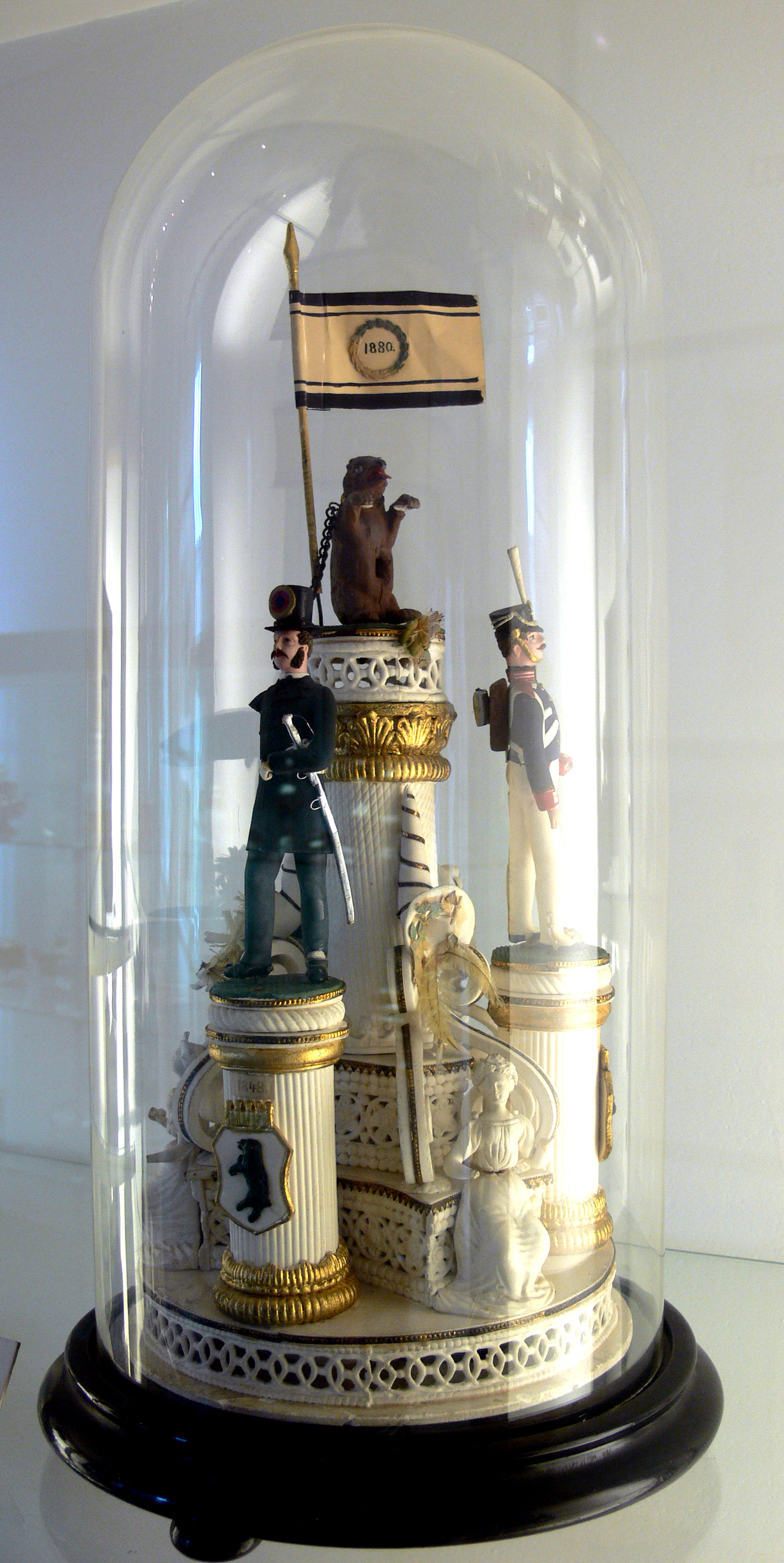
Sugar sculpture (1880)

Sugar sculpture is the art of producing artistic centerpieces, or showpieces, entirely composed of sugar and sugar derivatives. These were very popular at grand feasts from the Renaissance until at least the 18th century, and sometimes made by famous artists. Sugar was very expensive by modern standards, and sculptures in it a form of conspicuous consumption, reflecting wealth. Today, there are many competitions that include sugar sculpture.

Sugar showpieces can be composed of several different types of sugar elements. All begin with cooking sugar, and possibly an acidic agent and/or non-sucrose sugar product to avoid unwanted crystallization, to the hard crack stage, around 300 °F (149 °C).

When all components are completed, they are welded together using a gas torch. The sugar is melted, and then joined.

== Types ==
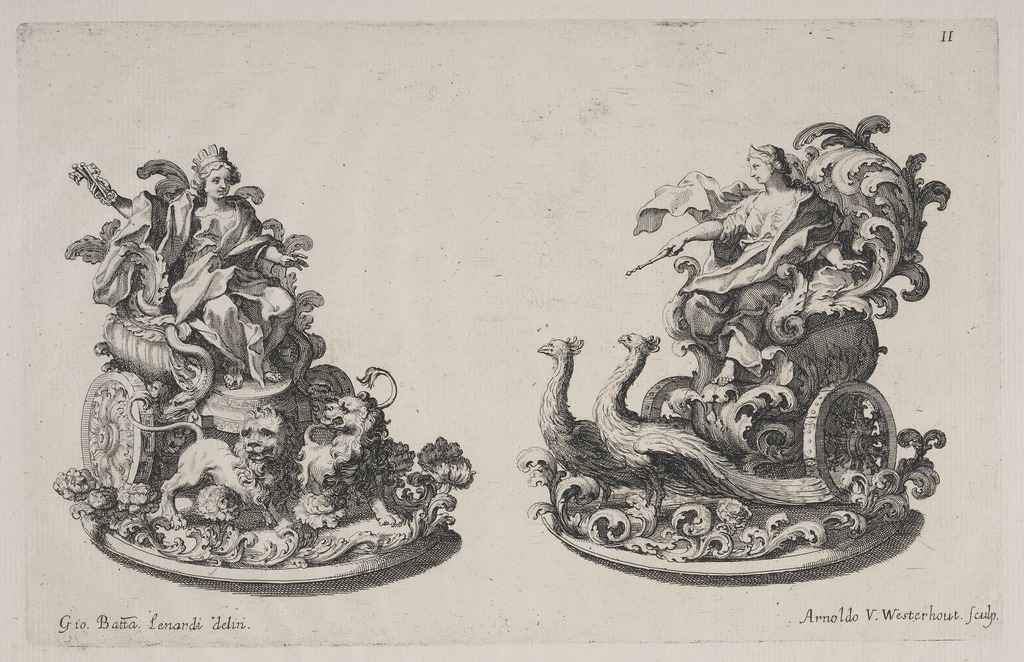
Two elaborate sugar triomfi of goddesses for a dinner given by the Earl of Castlemaine, British Ambassador in Rome, 1687

=== Pulled sugar ===
The sugar has been cooked, and the now-liquid sugar is poured onto a silicone rubber mat. Any coloring is now added. The sugar is then folded repeatedly into itself, until the sugar is, while still flexible, cool enough to handle. The sugar is then stretched out and then folded on itself repeatedly. This process incorporates air into the sugar, and gives it a bright lustrous sheen. The sugar can then be sculpted by hand into various shapes, made into ribbons, or blown.

=== Blown sugar ===
In blown sugar, a portion of pulled sugar is placed on a rubber pump which is tipped with either wood or metal. Pumps are most commonly hand pumps. While being blown, the sugar can be shaped, often into animals or flowers. Blown sugar cannot be quickly cooled by dipping it in water, so chefs must use fans to cool the sugar, all the while rotating it, so that it does not come out of shape. This technique is very useful in making balloons for wedding cakes.

=== Cast sugar ===
In this technique, sugar is poured into molds. This technique produces sturdier pieces than the pulled and blown sugar techniques do, and it is almost always used for the base and structural elements of showpieces. Cast sugar can also be used in many other recipes such as those for cakes.

=== Pastillage ===
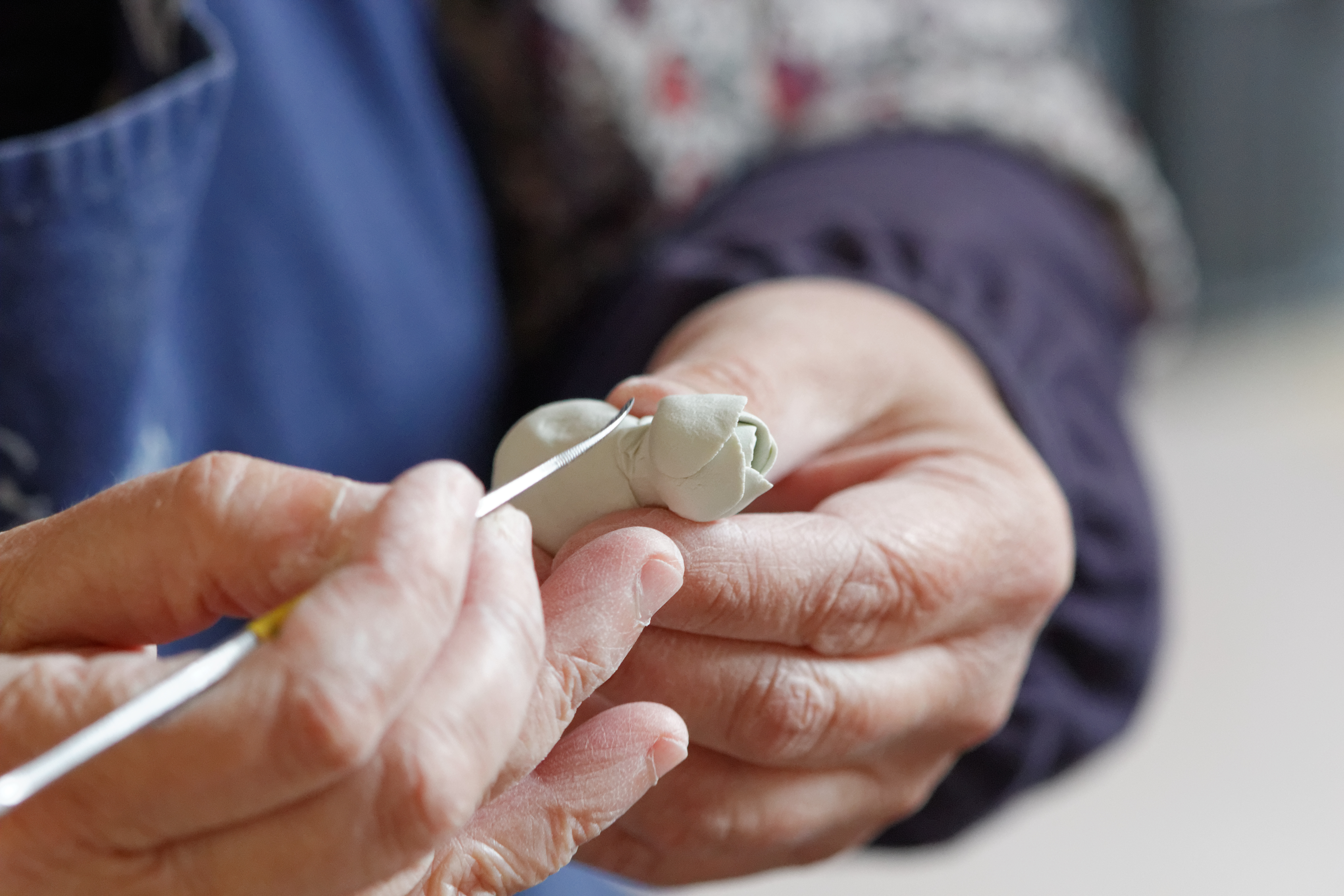
Making a rose out of pastillage

A thick sugar paste, similar to gum paste, is molded into shapes. When dried, it is hard and brittle. Made with gelatin, water and confectioner's sugar, it hardens quickly and can be shaped for a short while by hand, and after hardening, with electric grinders, cutters, sandpaper and assorted files. Some recipes will contain an acid in the ingredients list, such as vinegar or cream of tartar.

=== Pressed sugar ===
Granulated sugar is mixed with a minimal amount of water, and is put under pressure. It hardens into a solid piece. Though this is used for showpiece bases, it is less often used because of the time required to produce it, and its lesser aesthetic value.

=== Rock sugar ===
The liquid sugar is blended with a small amount of royal icing. The heat from the sugar causes the air incorporated in the icing to rapidly expand, causing the mixture to grow to several times its original volume. The mixture is quickly poured into a lined dish, and placed into a blast chiller to set. This process produces a sugar mass with the texture of volcanic pumice, the color of which is determined by the color of the sugar syrup.

=== Spun sugar ===
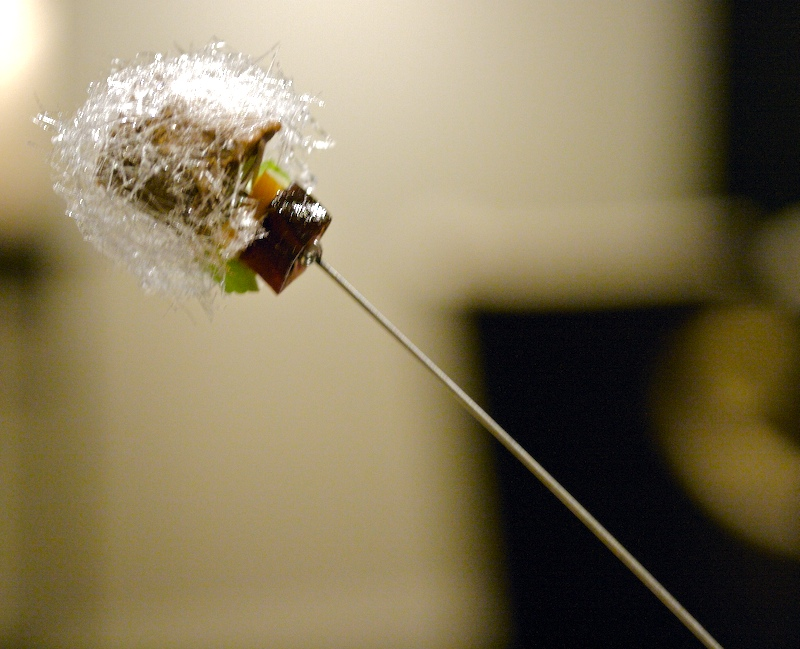
Spun sugar around a bite-size dessert

Sugar syrup is made into long extremely thin strands which can be shaped to make things like birds' nests. The sugar is gathered on a fork or a special tool designed for spinning sugar and is flicked in long strokes over succeeding pipes.

== Uses ==
Sugar sculptures may be used as alternatives to a wedding cake. However, they are often much more expensive, as they are made-to-order and very time-consuming to create.

=== Sugar people ===
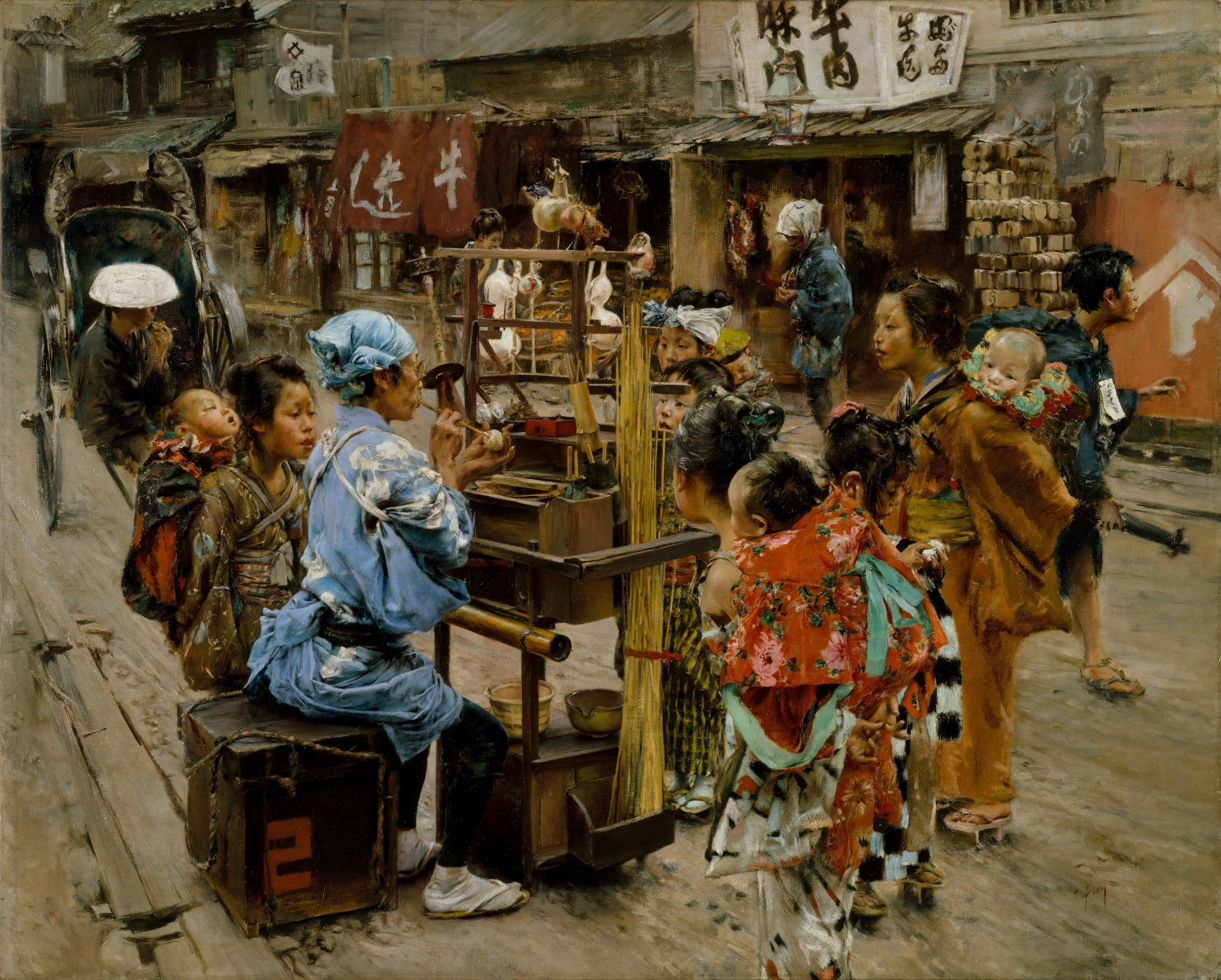
"The Ameya (Japanese candy man)" by Robert Frederick Blum, 1893

This traditional Chinese art form uses heated, liquid sugar to create three dimensional, often blown figures. It is called "糖人 (sugar people)". Japan has the similar tradition, which is called "Amezaiku (飴細工)". The sugar people's candy in China are brownish-yellow, while the ones in Japan are white because they use "sarashi-ame (whitish candy)", which is made by pulling and stretching out the sugar many times until white.

== Cultural references ==
A Mother Goose nursery rhyme refers to sugar sculpture:

Wasn't it funny? hear it all people!

Little Tom Thumb has swallowed a steeple!
How did he do it?
I'll tell you, my son:

'Twas made of white sugar—and easily done!

== See also ==
- Chinese Folk Art
- Fondant
- Sugar painting – a two-dimensional style of painting that uses hot sugar syrup to make flat, decorative candies
- Chocolate sculpture
