= Sugar people =

Chinese folk art created using sugar

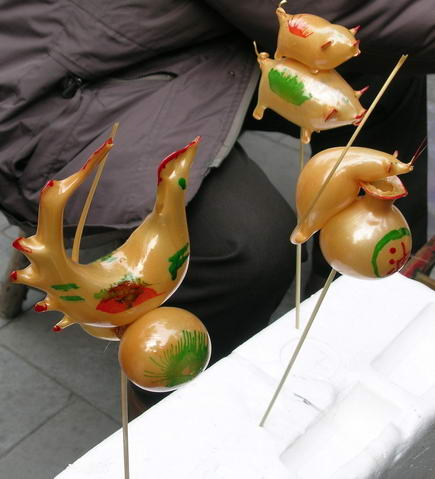
Various completed figures on sale.

Sugar people (糖人: Tángrén) is a traditional Chinese form of folk art using hot, liquid sugar to create three-dimensional figures.

These fragile, plump figures have a distinct brownish-yellow colour, usually with yellow or green pigment added. They are mainly purchased for ornamental purposes and not for consumption, due to sanitary concerns. Popular figures include animals such as dragons, roosters and pigs, and such objects as machetes and spears.

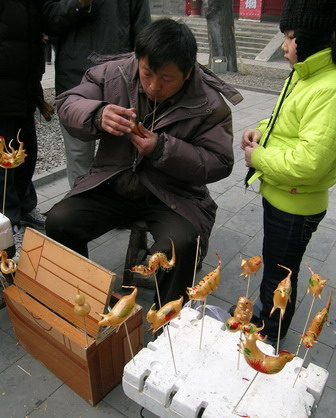

Similar to the trade of producing sugar paintings, this art form has been practiced in public places for more than 600 years, and can still be seen today. Traditionally, artists set up their point of production and sale in areas such as markets, and outside schools, as the figures appeal to children. These days, this art form is practiced in tourist areas.

Prices can range from one or two, to tens of RMB, depending on the piece. However, during difficult economic times, artists would exchange figures for metal scraps, broken shoes, old clothing, and notably, toothpaste. Children would often scavenge for these items in order to purchase a figure.

== Technique ==
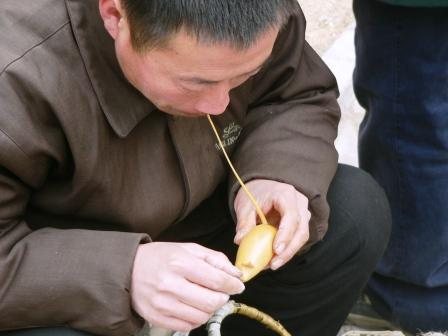

To start, the artist heats the sugar syrup they are using (usually sucrose and maltose) to at least 170 degrees. Next, the artist pulls off a section and uses his or her hands to knead it into a ball. A thin straw is then inserted into the ball, and the artist begins to blow air into it, in order to slowly inflate it. Simultaneously, the artist pinches and pulls parts of the ball, by hand, or sometimes with tools such as tweezers, to produce limbs, and various shapes. Before the figure has completely cooled, colours, typically red or green, are added to the surface, and a wooden stick is inserted into the underside. The straw is then extracted, and the figure put on display for sale.

== See also ==
- Chinese folk art
- Amezaiku in Japan
- Sugar painting
- Sugar sculpture
- Tò he
