= The Ameya =

Painting by Robert Frederick Blum

- The Candy Blower
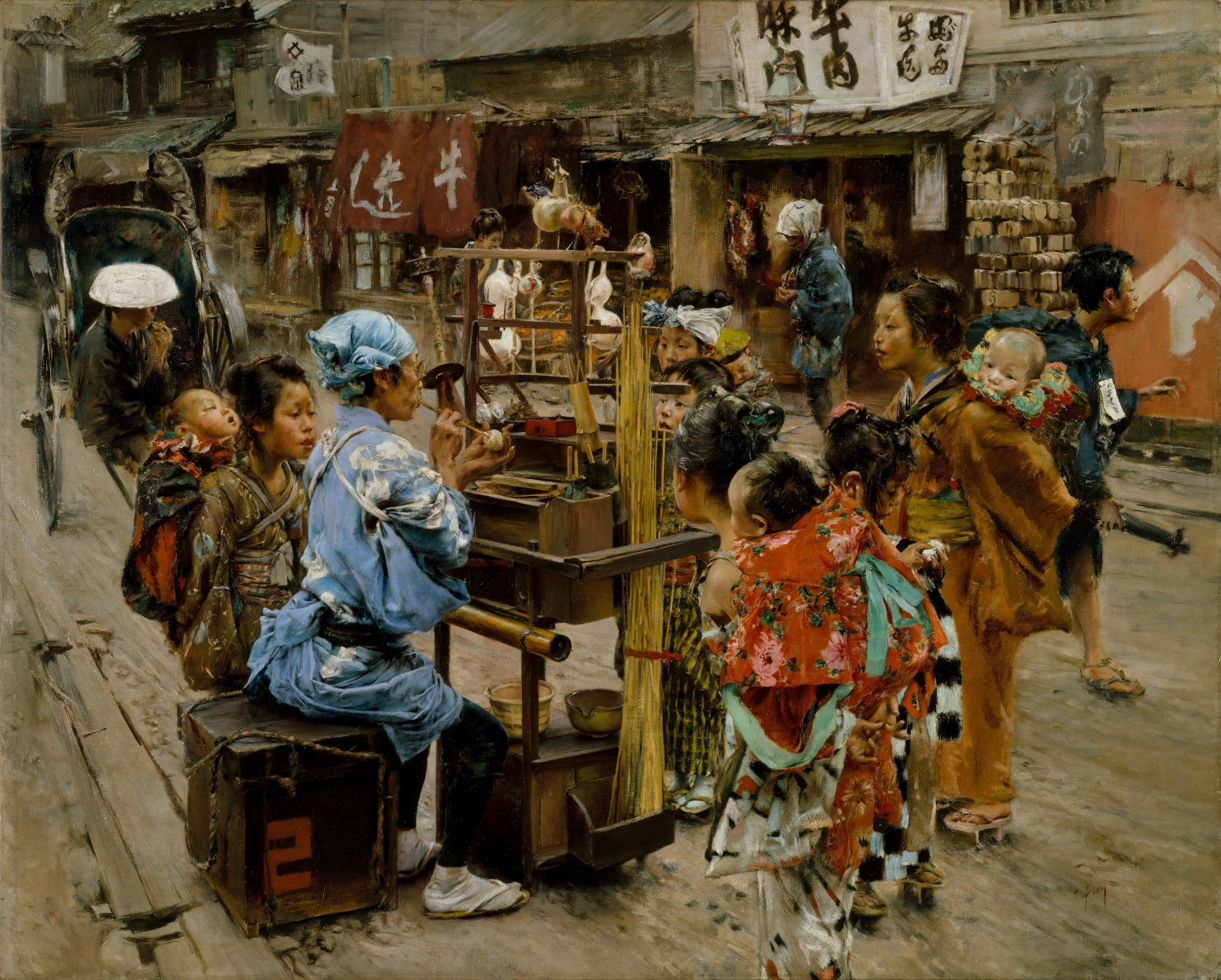
- Artist: Robert Frederick Blum
- Year: c. 1893
- Medium: Oil on canvas
- Dimensions: 63.7 cm × 78.9 cm (25.1 in × 31.1 in)
- Location: Metropolitan Museum of Art; New York City
- Accession: 04.31

The Ameya, also known as The Candy Blower, is a late 19th-century painting by American artist Robert Frederick Blum. Done in oil on canvas, the illustration depicts a Japanese candy maker (practicing the art of Amezaiku) at work. The Ameya is in the collection of the Metropolitan Museum of Art.

== Description ==
In 1890, Scribner's Magazine dispatched American painter Robert Frederick Blum to Japan to illustrate a series of articles (written by Sir Edwin Arnold) the magazine was publishing. Blum occupied a small house in Tokyo for two years, and traveled through the country in search of scenes to illustrate.

The Ameya was created by Blum during the later period of his stay in Japan. The work depicts an ameya, a candy maker practicing the art of Amezaiku; Blum himself described the ameya's work as being akin to glassblowing.

Following his return to the United States, Blum's work was well received, particularly at the 1893 exhibition of the National Academy of Design—Blum later credited The Ameya with securing his election to the Academy. A critic for the New York Times praised the work's use of multiple subjects in varied dress, and described it as being "admirably painted". Other sources have cited Ameya as being an example of Blum's ability to convincingly render groups of figures in his illustrations.

The painting was once owned by Alfred Corning Clark, whose estate donated it to the Metropolitan Museum of Art in 1904.
