= Tò he =

Traditional Vietnamese toy

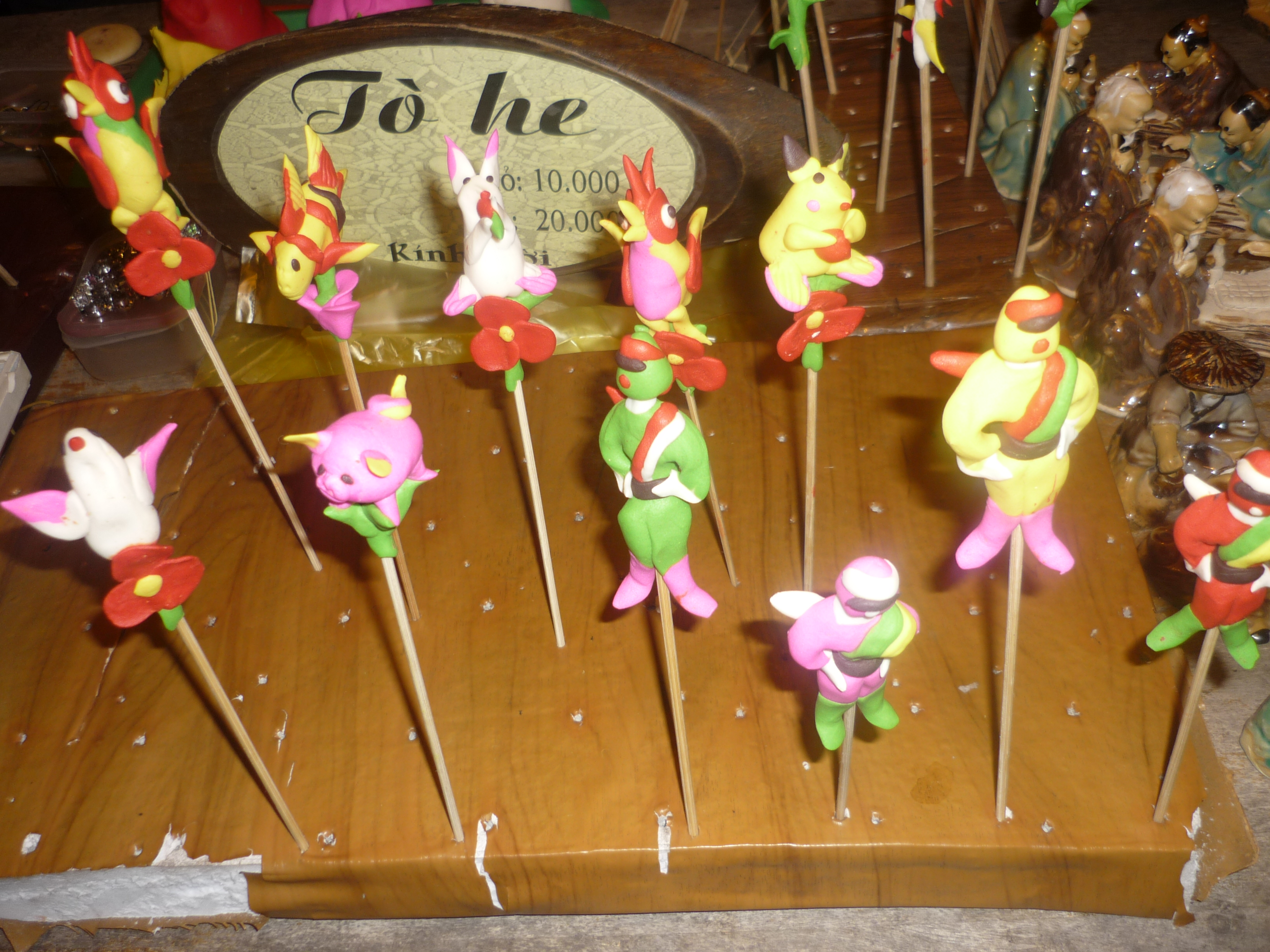
Tò he

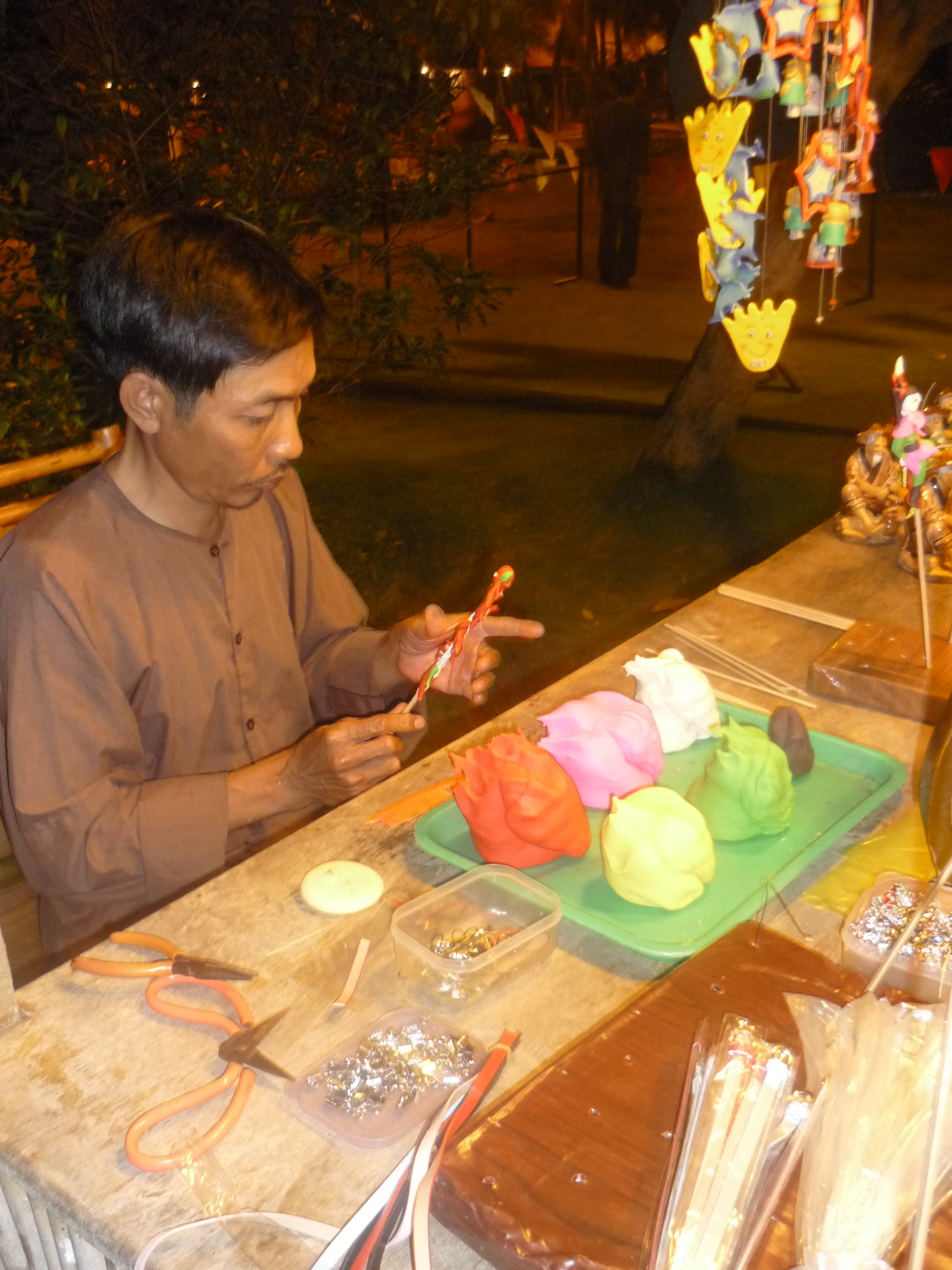
A tò he craftsman at work

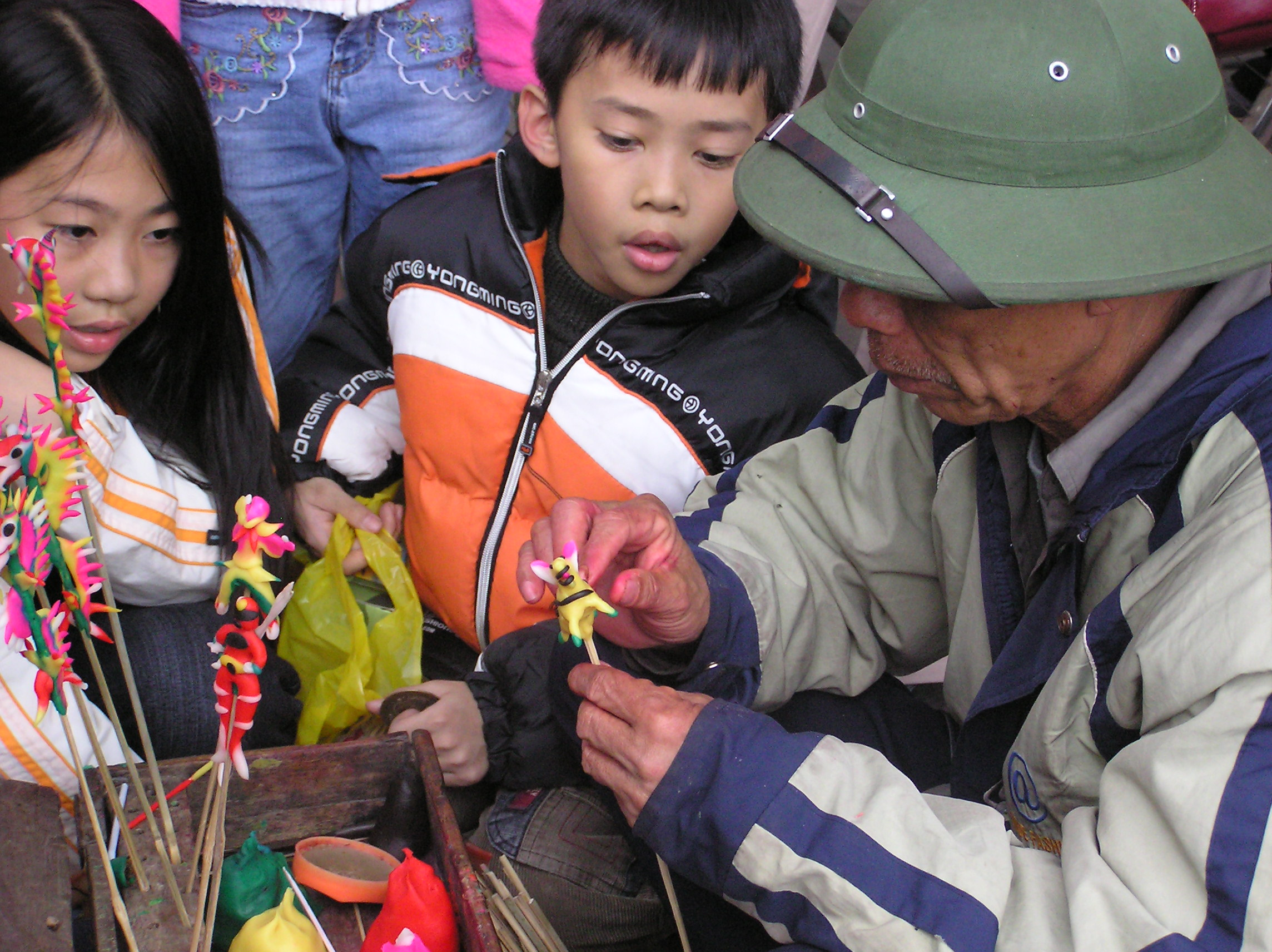
A tò he craftsman with children.

Tò he (toy figurine) or con giống bột is a traditional toy for children in Vietnam which is made from glutinous rice powder in form of edible figurine such as animals, flowers or characters in folk stories. In the past, tò he was made and sold only on the occasion of festivals, especially the Tết Nguyên Đán and the Tết Trung Thu which are the favorite festivals of Vietnamese children. Nowadays, the toy is introduced in almost all traditional festivals and in public places like parks or gardens. As tò he is one of the rare surviving traditional toys of Vietnam, the art of tò he making is considered a cultural ambassador of Vietnam and there are many efforts in order to preserve and develop this traditional art.

== Making ==
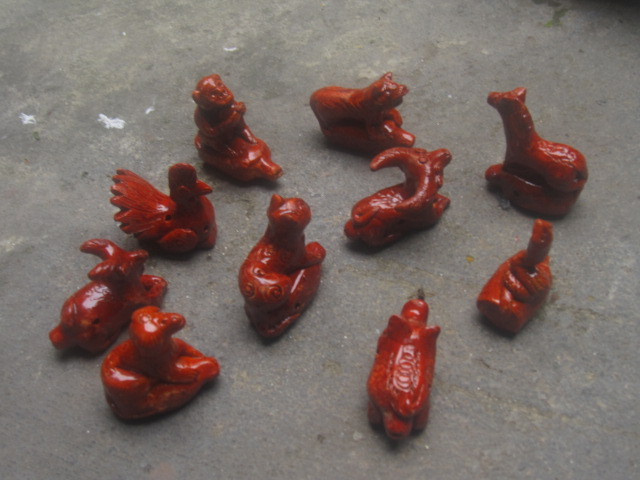
Con thổi, a kind of tò he of Hội An

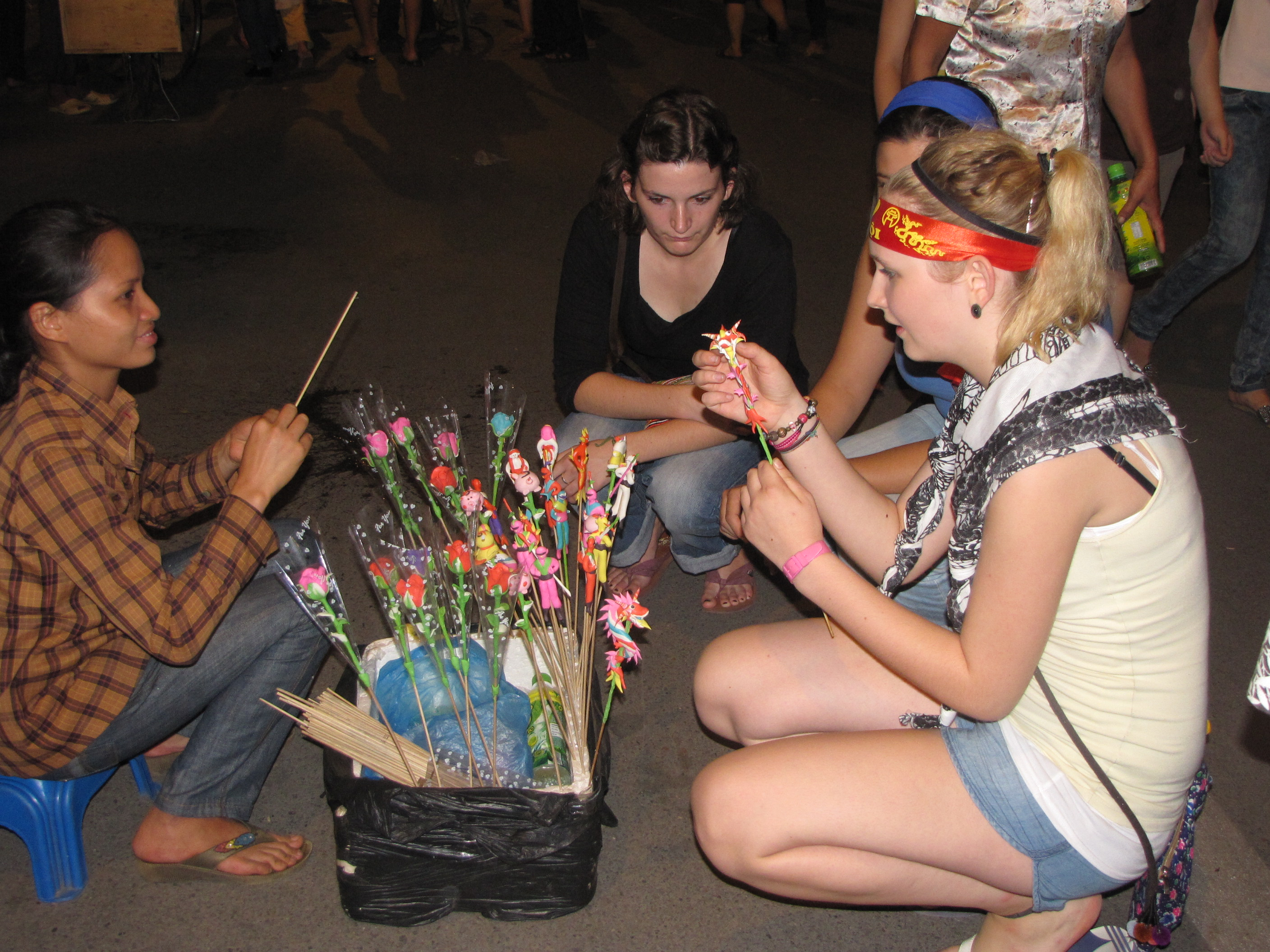
A woman is making tò he to sell to tourists

To create a tò he figurine, the artist needs a mixture of glutinous and ordinary rice powders, which is easy to knead into different shapes and edible for children, and bamboo sticks to plant the shaped tò he, as well as their own artistic skill. Modeled by the hand of the artist, the forms of tò he figurine are drawn from animals, flowers and characters in folk stories such as Tôn Ngộ Không, the Monkey King in Journey to the West. There are seven basic colours of tò he figurines which are green, sea blue, red, purple, yellow, white and black, those colours come from rice powder mixed with food dyes which are used to replace colours from trees or ashes in order to ensure the edibleness of tò he. In the past, tò he was steamed after being kneaded but today the figurines are made directly from preboiled paste so that the craftsman can reduce the time for making one tò he figurine. The paste is made from glutinous and ordinary rice powders, it was kneaded with fresh water before dropped in boiling water for one hour and finally dyed with food colour.

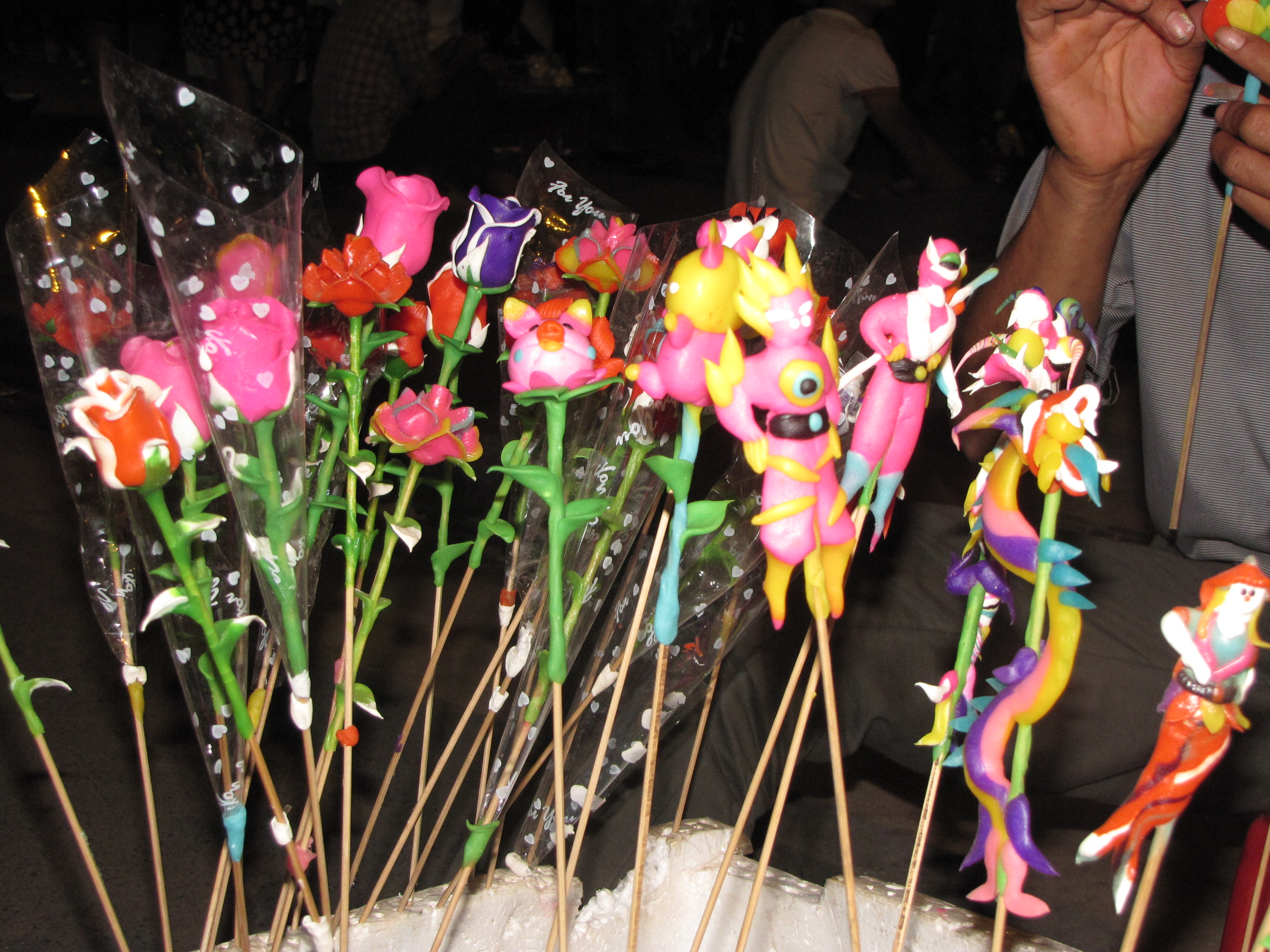
A stall selling tò he

The procedure of tò he making requires utmost patience from the craftsman, but almost all tò he makers are men and there is an unwritten law in families of tò he craftsmen that secret in making tò he is only passed from father to sons and daughters-in-law, not to daughters. There are no lesson of tò he making, sons are transmitted the skill from their father solely in watching and self-learning. Nevertheless, nowadays tò he making is also taught to the handicapped so that they can live on making tò he and other forms of traditional art.

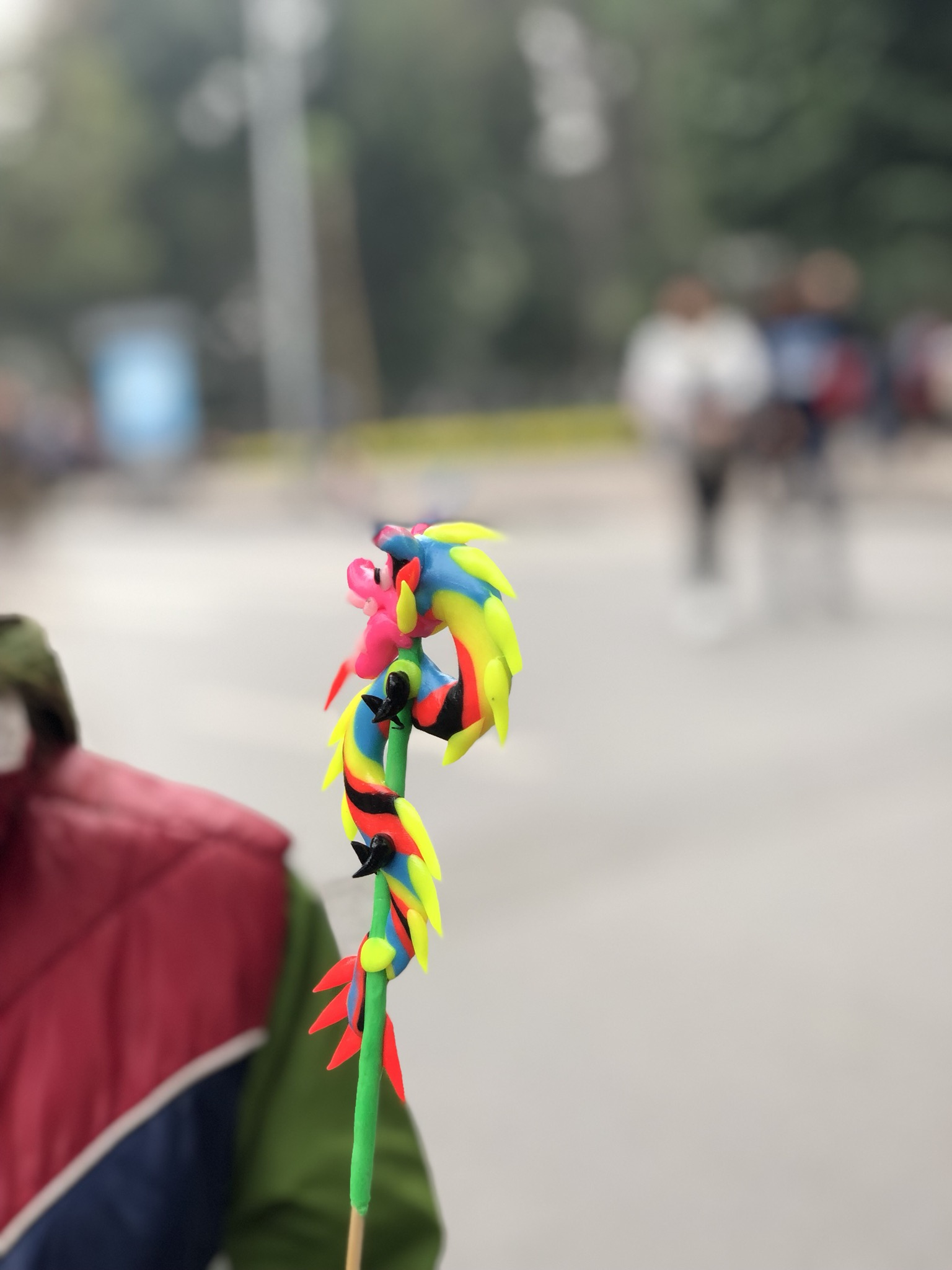
Dragon tò he

== History ==
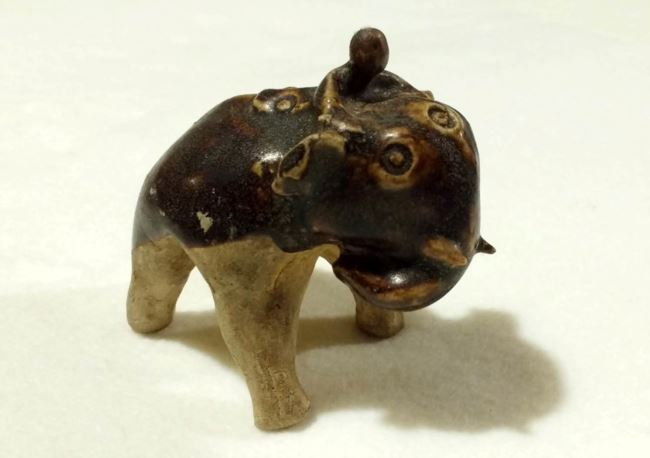
Con giống with brown glaze, XIII-XIV centuries

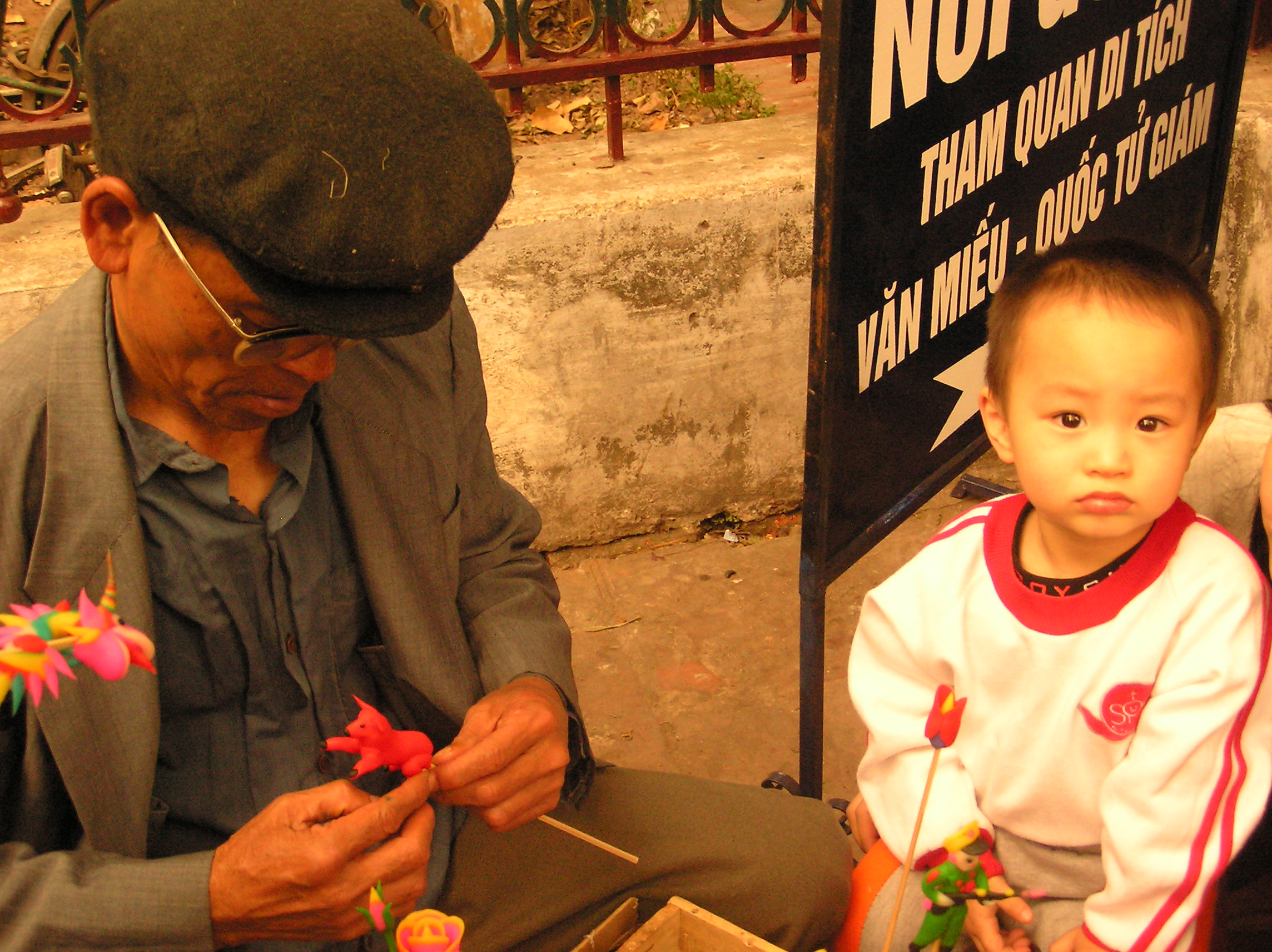
A tò he craftsman making an animal figurine besides the Temple of Literature, Hanoi.

Traditionally, tò he craftsmen had a compact set of tools so that in one day they could go to several common places such as markets, communal temple grounds and especially local festivals where children often gathered to play or accompany their parents. According to the old generation of tò he craftsmen, the origin of tò he making was dated to the 17th century. The two most important occasions each year for tò he craftsmen are Tết Nguyên Đán and Tết Trung Thu because they are the favorite festivals for Vietnamnese children.

Nowadays, tò he is made and sold not only during the Tết holiday and other festivals but also all year round in public place like parks, gardens. The price for a figurine sold in Hanoi varies from 3,000 to 5,000 VND. There is a village in the countryside of Hanoi where many people earn their living by making and selling tò he, it is Xuân La village which has about 200 tò he craftsmen and almost all villagers from children to adults can make tò he figurine in a very brief period. Facing the threat from modern toys and other forms of entertainment, tò he craftsmen have to be more and more creative so that their figurines can appear more lively and closer to the children, for that reason tò he figurines today can be also modeled after characters from international films and cartoons such as Doraemon, Pikachu and even Sailor Moon with her very own blond hair.

As one of the rare surviving traditional toys in modern time, tò he is considered a cultural ambassador of Vietnam. Some craftsmen are invited to the United States or South Korea to perform the art of tò he making. Another positive sign for the existence of tò he is that the Ministry of Culture and Information of Vietnam has paid more attention in preserving and propagating this traditional art. A tò he craftsman from Thái Bình was presented with medal from the Vietnam Folk Literature and Art Association for his effort in preserving the art of tò he making while tò he is frequently introduced in cultural festivals. Tò he is brought to the poor children of the mountainous region in the North of Vietnam who cannot afford to buy toys, they are also given instructions to make simple forms of tò he figurines.

== See also ==
- Amezaiku
- Sugar people
