= Candy Miyuki =

Artist

Miyuki
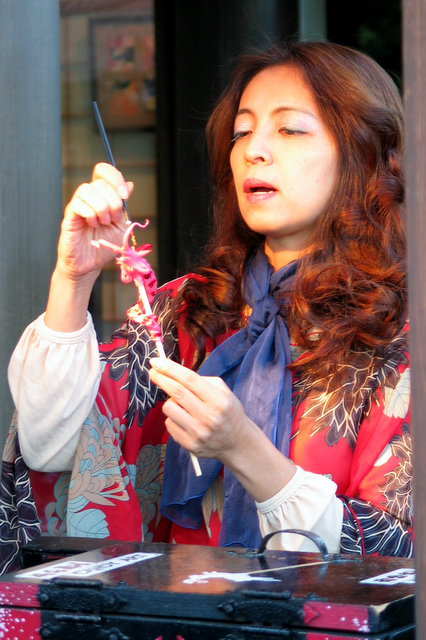
- Born: Miyuki Sugimori
- Known for: Ame Zaiku or Japanese candy art (rice dough sculpting)

Miyuki is an amezaiku artist who performed at Epcot's Japanese Pavilion inside the World Showcase from 1996 until November 23, 2013. She creates sculptures on a stick from soft rice dough, a taffy-like confection made from corn starch and sugar. She makes animals at the request of guests, in mere seconds; the most popular request is a dragon. She starts with a white base and adds color as needed. The candy she works with is heated to 200 degrees to make it malleable, which is one of the reasons so few people have mastered this art. She must work quickly before the sugar cools and hardens.

Miyuki is one of the only women trained in Ame Zaiku or Japanese Candy Art, candy artistry dating back 250 years to the Edo period. There are only 15 formally trained Ame Zaiku artists in the world. Miyuki began her apprenticeship in 1989 under her grandfather Mr. Kinura. After completing her training and becoming an independent candy artist, she traveled to Italy in 1994. She has also traveled extensively in Japan and Europe to demonstrate her artistic creation of the candy arts at conventions, local festivals, and private parties.

She has a daughter, Shido, and when a guest asks if she plans on teaching her daughter this gift, she replies, "No, she cries because her hands hurt" (from the temperature).

She has appeared on several TV shows, such as The Rosie O'Donnell Show (2001), Sweet Dreams on The Food Network (October 2003), and The Travel Channel.
