= Robert Frederick Blum =

American artist

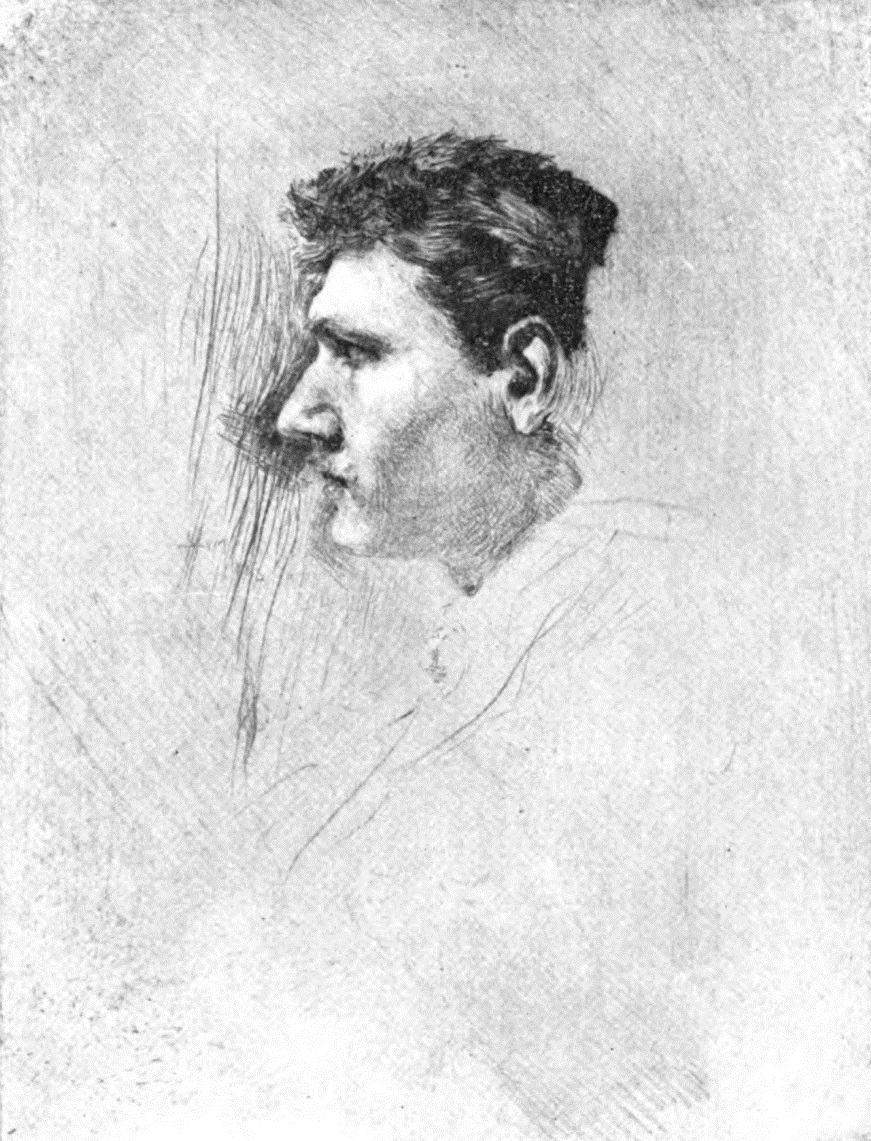
- Self-Portrait of Robert Frederick Blum
- Born: Robert Frederick Blum; 9 July 1857; Cincinnati, Ohio; United States of America
- Died: 8 June 1903 (aged 45); 90 Grove Street, New York City; New York, United States of America
- Known for: Painting, Drawing, Printmaking
- Notable work: The Ameya (The Metropolitan Museum of Art)
- Patrons: Alfred Corning Clark

Signature
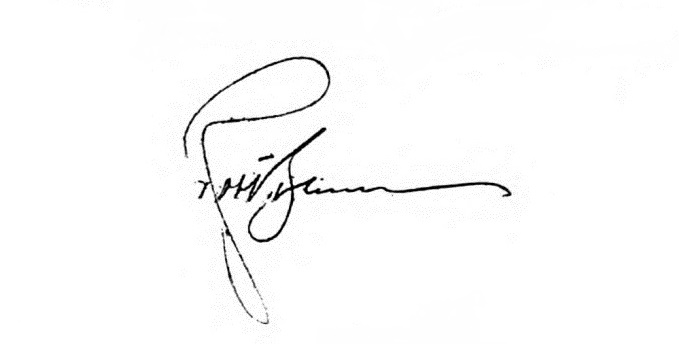

Robert Frederick Blum (9 July 1857 – 8 June 1903) was an American artist. He was one of the youngest members of the National Academy of Design and was President of the Painters in Pastel and a member of the Society of American Artists and the American Watercolor Society.

== Biography ==
Blum was born in Cincinnati, Ohio. He was employed for a time in a lithographic shop. He studied at the McMicken Art School of Design in Cincinnati and at the Pennsylvania Academy of Fine Arts in Philadelphia, but he was practically self-taught, and early on showed great and original talent.

He settled in New York City in 1879, doing his first work there for Charles Scribner's Sons, and the next year travelled to Venice, where he executed pen drawings and watercolours. After 1880, he made many annual trips to Europe. He returned to Venice in 1881 and in 1882 he visited Toledo and Madrid. In 1884 he visited the Netherlands. He visited Japan in 1890 and spent three years there; he had been interested in that country and its art for many years.

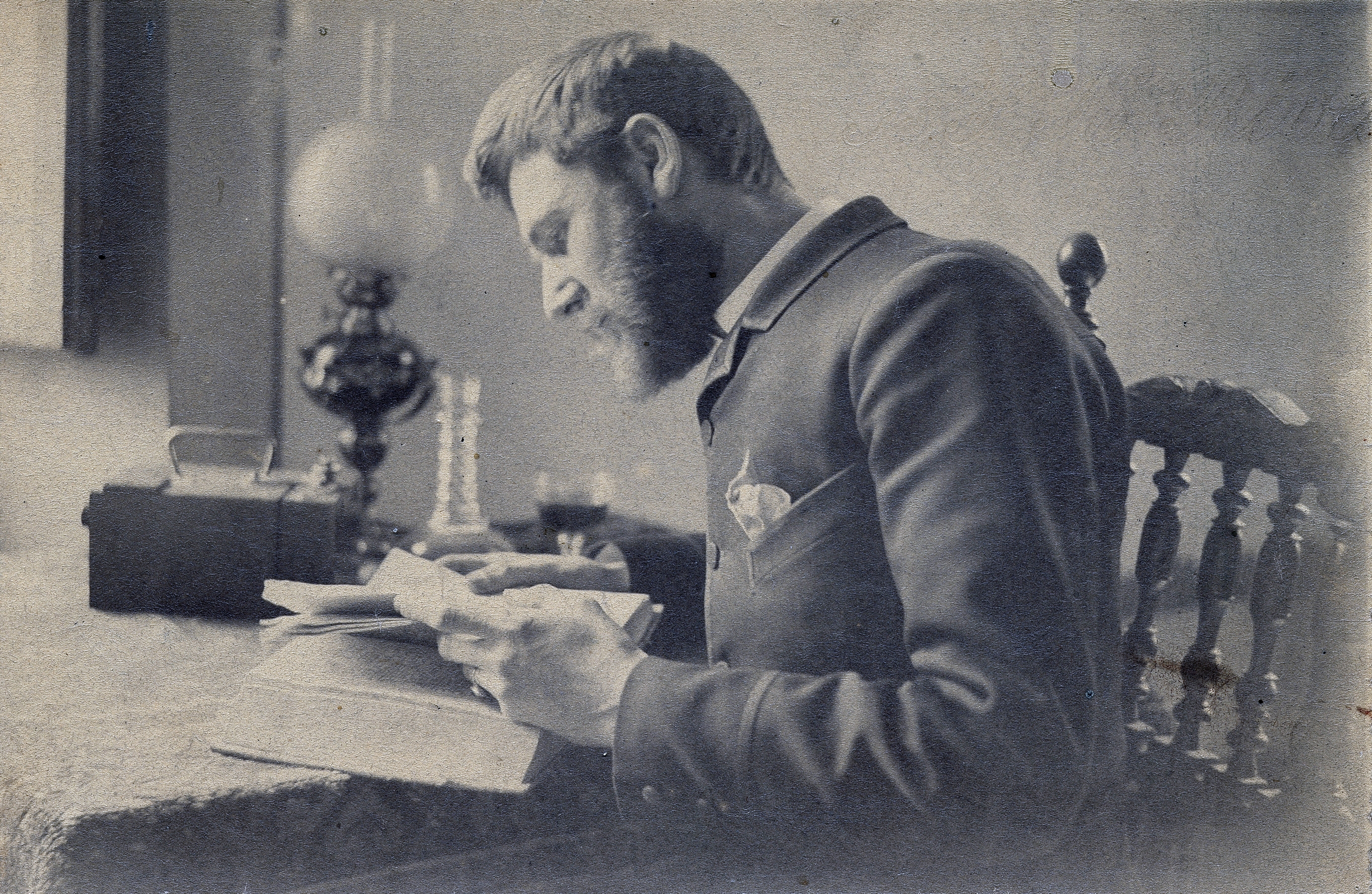
Portrait of Blum in 1875.

His first published sketches of Japanese jugglers appeared in the St. Nicholas Magazine. His most important work is a large frieze in the Mendelssohn Music Hall, New York, Music and the Dance (1895). His pen-and-ink work for the Century Magazine attracted wide attention, as did his illustrations for Sir Edwin Arnold's Japonica.

A Daughter of Japan, drawn by Blum and William Jacob Baer, was the cover of Scribner's Magazine for May 1893, and was one of the earliest pieces of color printing for an American magazine. His Artist's Letters from Japan also appeared in an 1893 edition of Scribner's. He was an admirer of Mariano Fortuny, whose methods somewhat influenced his work.

Blum's Venetian pictures, such as A Bright Day at Venice (1882), had lively charm and beauty. His oil painting The Venetian Beadstringers (1889) was a popular work, which, when shown at the National Academy of Design, resulted in him being elected an Associate. In 1893 he exhibited The Ameya at the Academy and was elected a full member based on that canvas.

Blum's chief patron, Alfred Corning Clark, heir to the Singer Sewing Machine fortune, commissioned twin canvasses, 50 feet long and 12 feet high, for the proscenium of Mendelssohn Hall in downtown New York, which he had constructed to house the famous Mendelssohn Glee Club. The first of these, finished in 1895, was entitled Music and the Dance (originally Moods of Music) and is considered Blum’s most important work. The other, The Feast of Bacchus, was modeled on a painting of the same title that Blum had sent to Clark as a gift in 1888, but was not completed until after Clark's death in 1896. These works went missing when the Hall was demolished in 1912, but were later found in the vaults of the Brooklyn Museum, which put them on temporary display for the 100th anniversary of the Glee Club in 1966.

Robert Frederick Blum died of pneumonia at his home at 90 Grove Street, New York City on 8 June 1903.

== Gallery ==
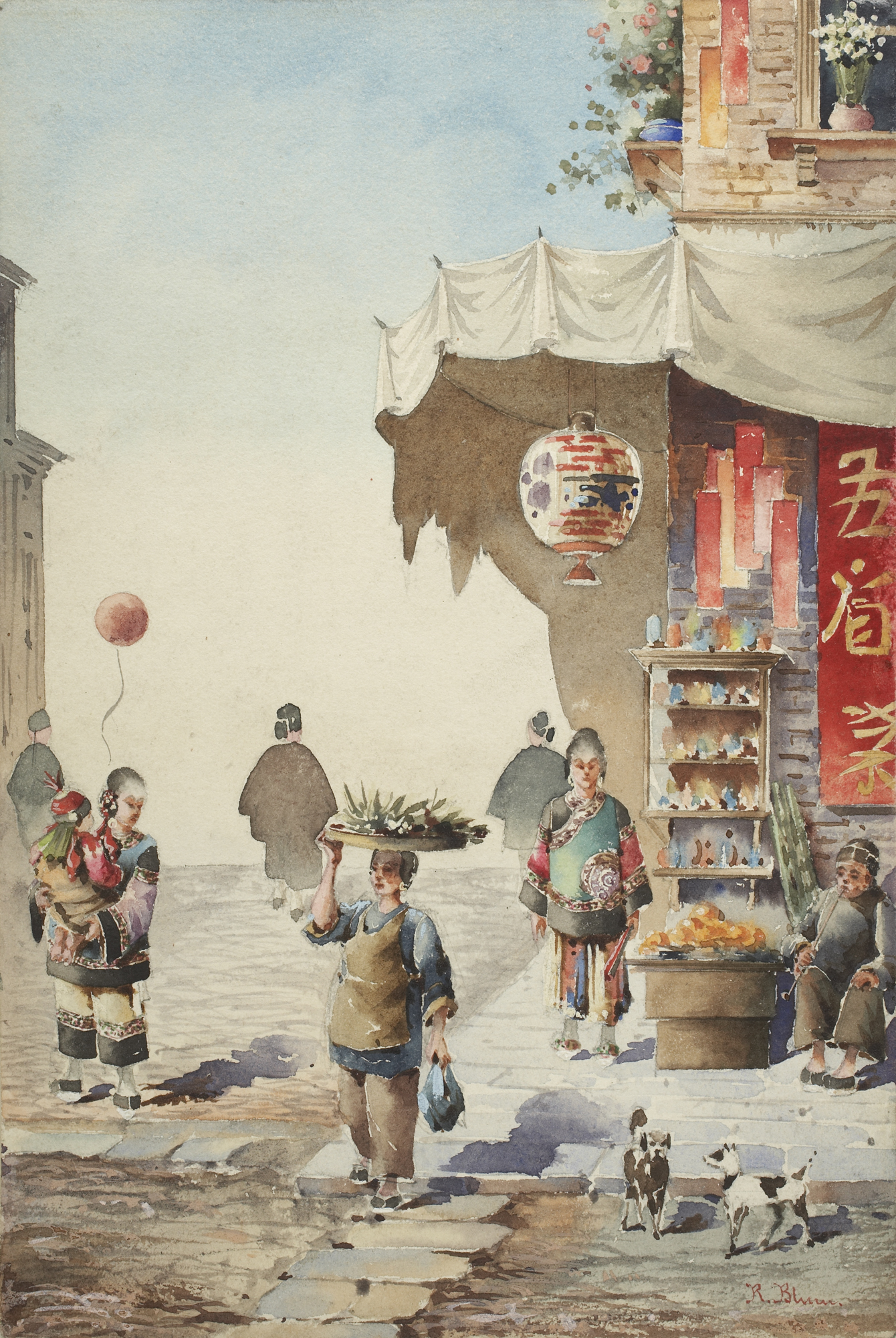
Chinese street scene, after 1890, Princeton University Art Museum. He never visited China. Based on his many illustrations of Japanese street scenes.

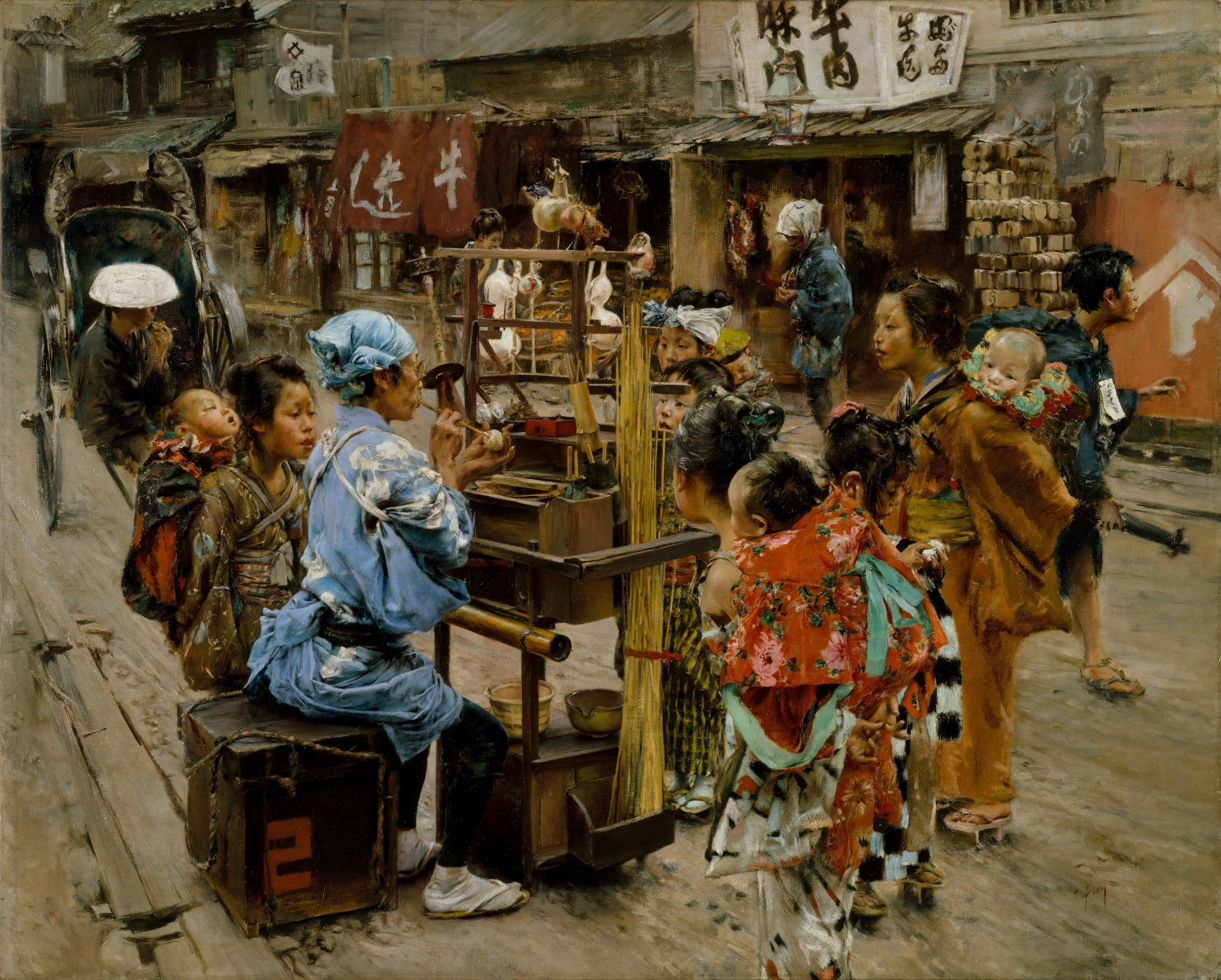
The Ameya (ca. 1893), oil on canvas, 63.7 x 78.9 cm, The Metropolitan Museum of Art. Ameya means a candy-seller.

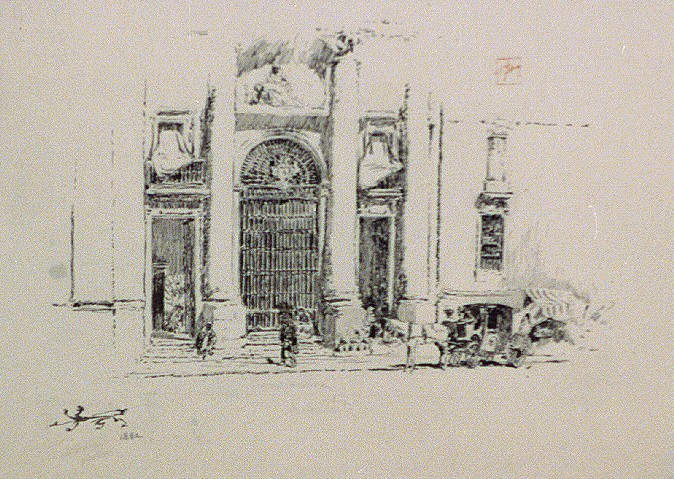
"Man before grilled entrance".

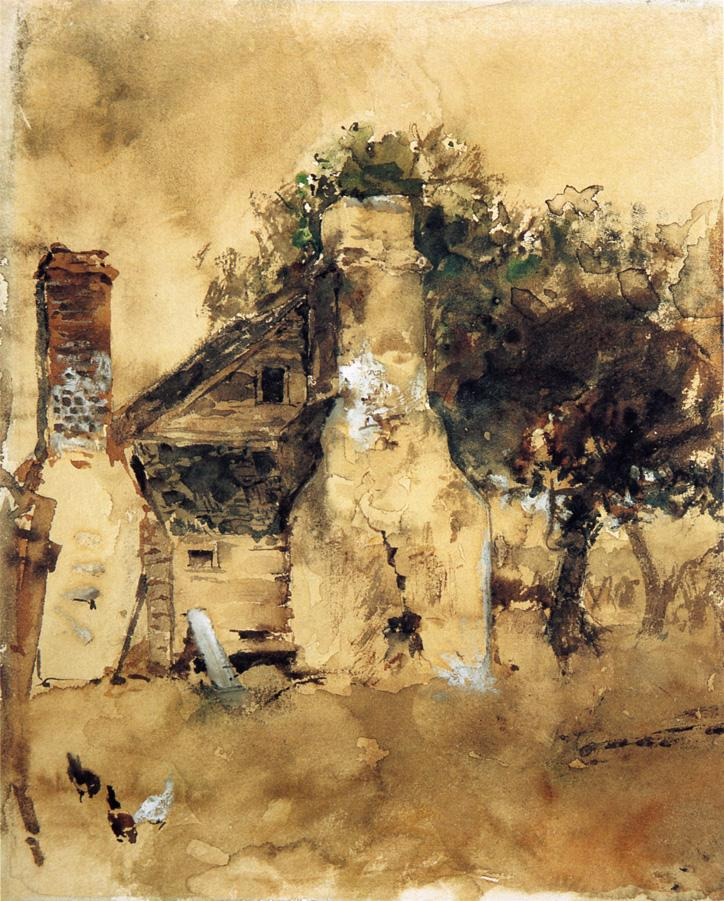
Old Powhatan Chimney.

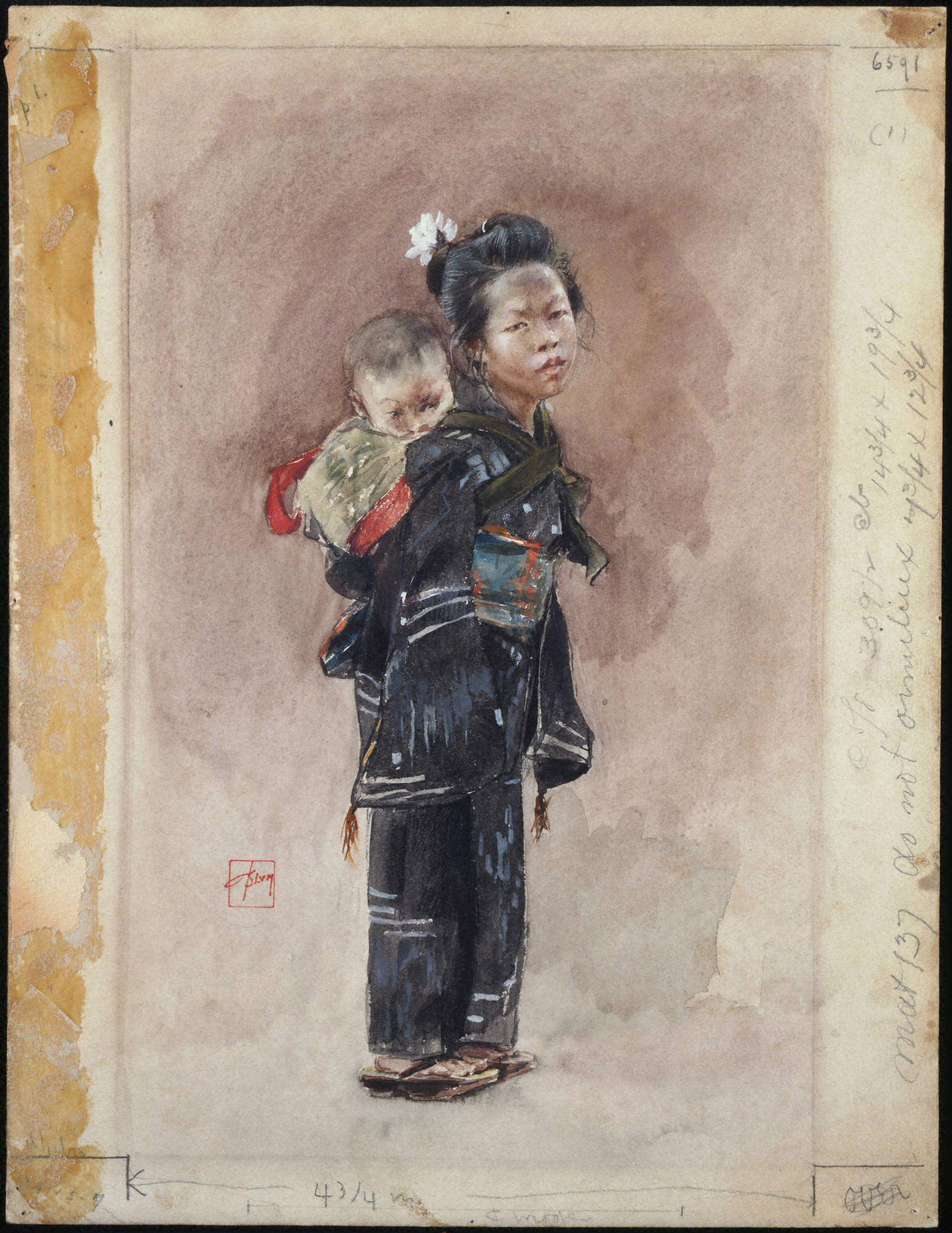
That is Where All Babies Live in Japan, 1890–92, Princeton University Art Museum.

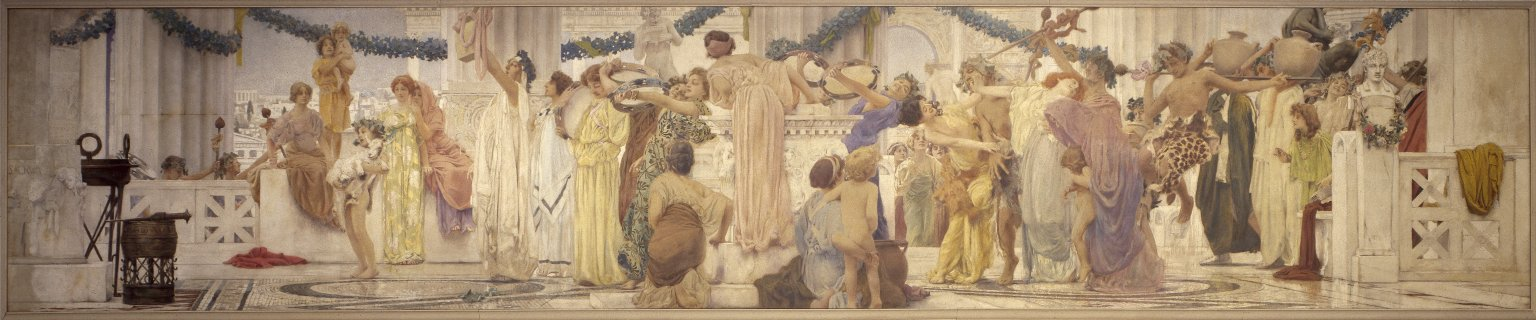
"Vintage Festival", ca.1890s. Brooklyn Museum
