= Sugar painting =

Chinese folk art and sugar confectionery

- Traditional Chinese: 糖畫
- Simplified Chinese: 糖画
Transcriptions
Standard Mandarin
- Hanyu Pinyin: táng huà

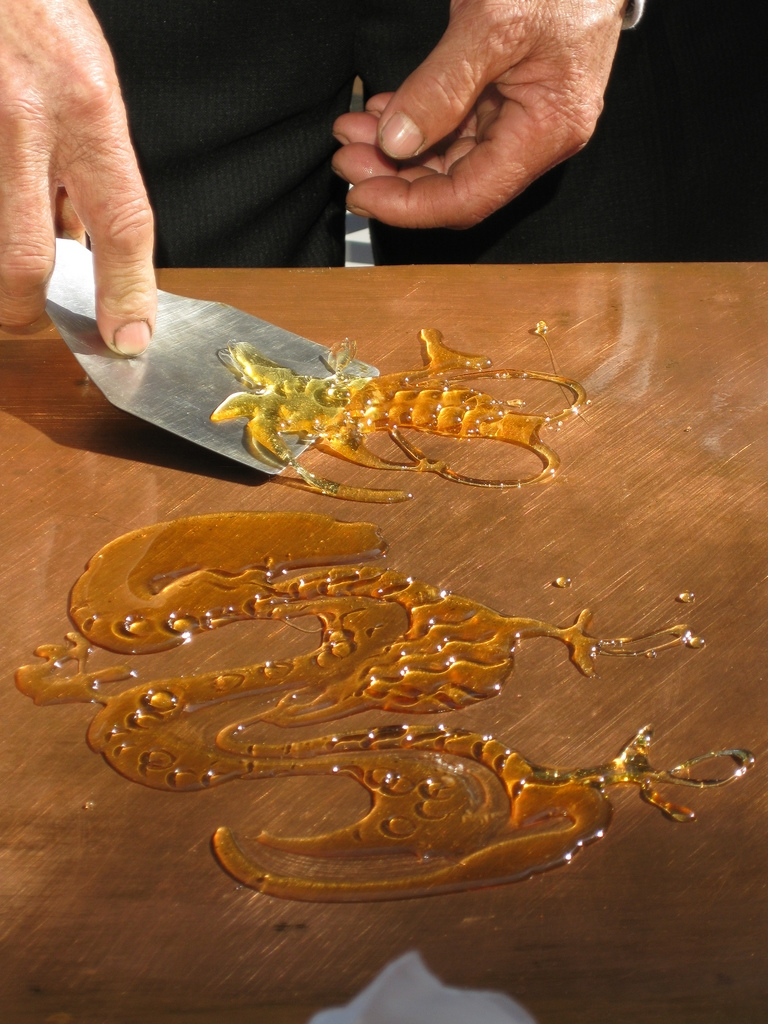
The artist is removing a dragon figure after it cooled and solidified.

Sugar painting (simplified Chinese: 糖画; traditional Chinese: 糖畫; pinyin: táng huà) is a form of traditional Chinese folk art and sugar confectionery, using hot, liquid sugar to create two dimensional objects on a marble or metal surface. Melted sugar is carried by a small ladle made by bronze or copper. After it cools, it will be stuck to a bamboo stick and removed using a spatula. Three dimensional objects can be created by laying solidified sugar.

== History ==
Sugar painting may have originated during the Ming dynasty when aristocratic families or government officials molded small animals made of sugar for religious rituals. This art form then became popular. After that period, as techniques improved, Chinese folk artists combined the molded sugar with other arts, like shadow play and paper cutting, to create a more diverse range of patterns. In Sichuan, during the Qing dynasty, further developments were made in production seeing the replacement of the molds with the now-common small ladle.

Nowadays, sugar painting is considered a traditional Chinese folk art. To promote the art of sugar painting, the Chinese government has listed it as a Provincial Non-Material Culture Heritage. After the reform and opening-up era in the late 20th century, many famous sugar painting artists were invited to foreign countries, such as Japan and Spain, to exhibit their art.

== Technique ==
An artisan finishes a goldfish figure, attaches the stick, and removes it from the working surface to present it to the customer.

The process of sugar painting includes four steps, including boiling down syrup, painting on a plane, sticking to a stick, removing from the plane. If a three dimensional figure is created, layers of pre-made two dimensional sugar painting are used.

Although techniques vary, normally the hot sugar is drizzled from a small ladle onto a flat surface, usually white marble or metal. The outline is produced with a relatively thick stream of sugar. Then, supporting strands of thinner sugar are placed to attach to the outline, and fill in the body of the figure. These supporting strands may be produced with swirls, zig-zags, or other patterns. Finally, when completed, a thin wooden stick, used to hold the figure, is attached in two or more places with more sugar. Then, while still warm and pliable, the figure is removed from the surface using a spatula-like tool, and is sold to the waiting customer, or placed on display.

In 2012, automatic machines for making sugar paintings started to appear in the market. Once sugar is added, the machine is programmed to paint on a plane in a process similar to automatic engraving. It does not need any art skills or experience, and is easy to operate. There are hundreds of graphics than can be painted using this machine.

== Folktale ==
Some say that it is created by a Chinese writer, Chen Zi'ang (陳子昂), during Tang Dynasty. He loved to eat brown sugar, but he liked to eat it in a unique way that he can both appreciate like an artwork and enjoy like sweets. So he melted the sugar and cast the sugar into molds to form its shape. One day, as he was holding the sugar casting on his hand, the prince passed by and saw it. He asked for it and took it away. After he got back, the emperor saw it and thought of it as an interesting invention. He complimented Chen Zi'ang and gives it a name, “sugar pancake”. So it became a snack popular in the court. After he left the palace, he spread this technique in his hometown, located in modern Sichuan province. Because of the emperor's compliment, this form of art and food became popular quickly and developed as the sugar painting nowadays.

== Objects ==
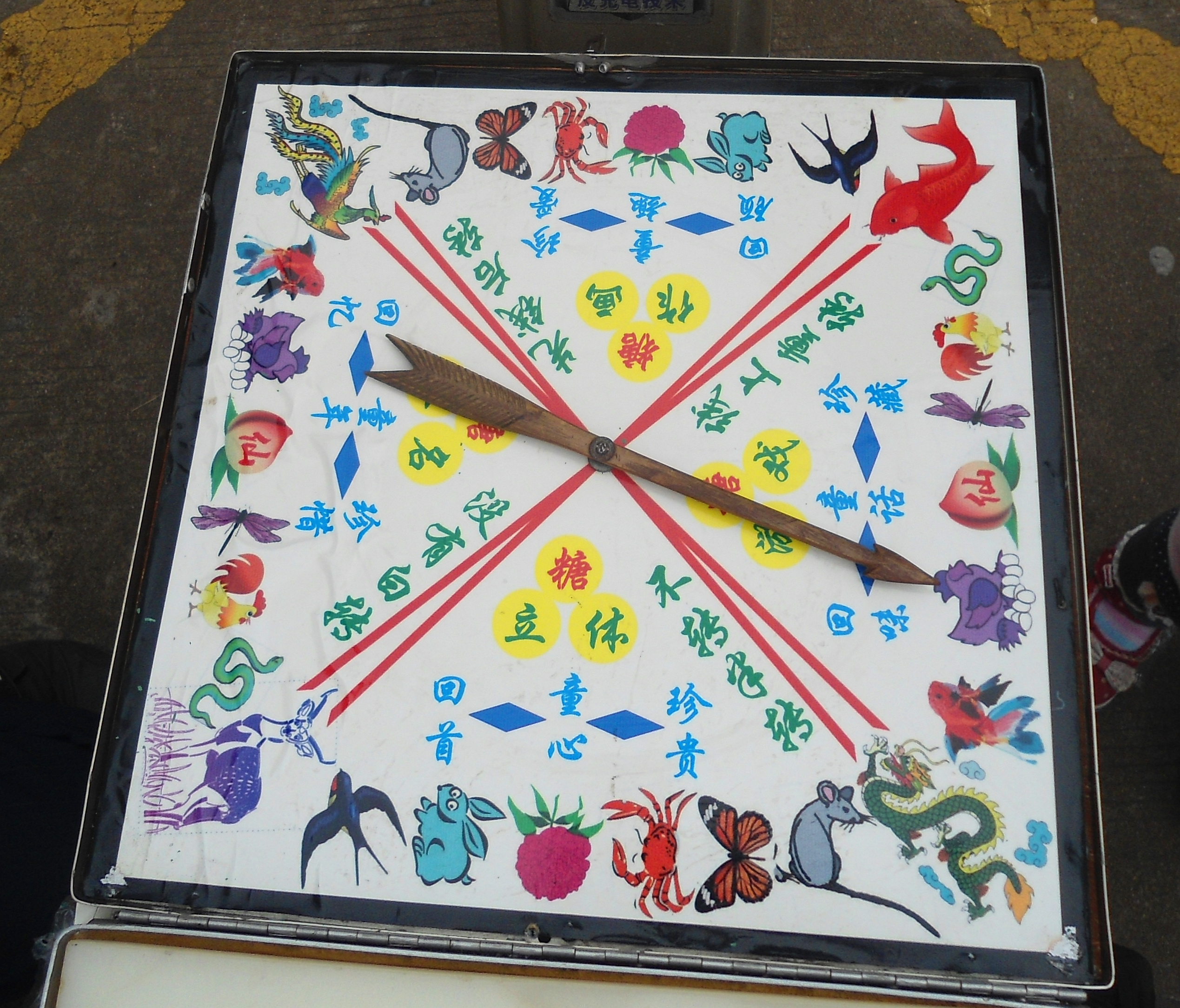
Customers spin the arrow to select the figure to be created.

The snack is popular among children. Customers, especially children, usually select a figure by spinning an arrow on a wheel, which will randomly land on a subject. Animals, such as the duck, fish, monkey, dog, or bird, are common. Other commonly depicted subjects are famous characters from Chinese classical novels, mythical creatures, Chinese gods, fictional characters from Chinese operas, plants or flowers, symbols of fortune such as the dragon or phoenix, and everyday objects such as bicycles.

== Location ==
Authentic sugar painting can be found in Sichuan province. Since the practice has increased in popularity, it can also be found in other regions of China, such as Henan, Tianjin, Beijing, and so on.

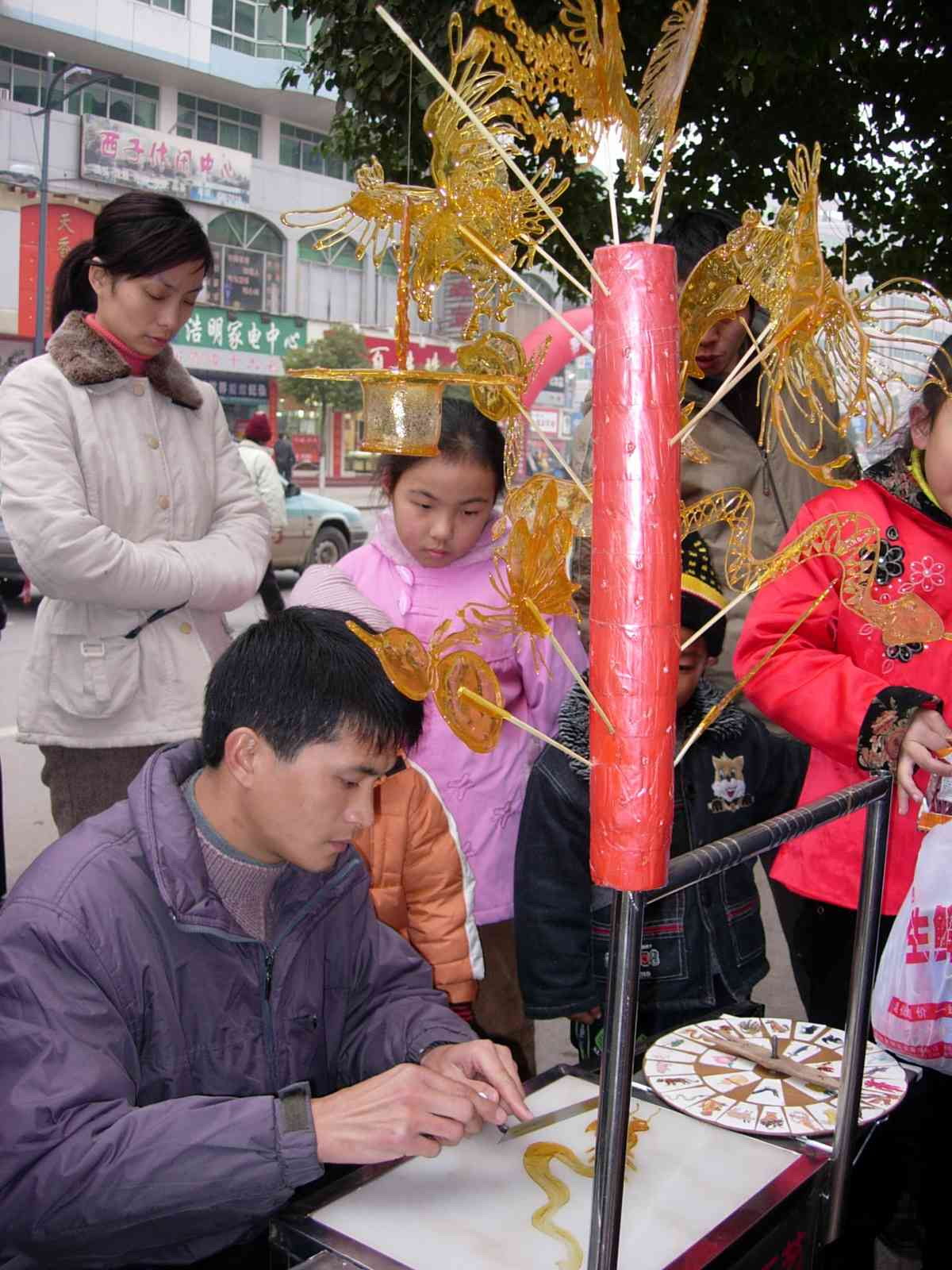
Artist creating and displaying sugar paintings in Jiangxi province, China.

== See also ==
- Chinese folk art
- List of Chinese desserts
- List of desserts
- Sugar people
