= Amezaiku =

Japanese candy craft artistry

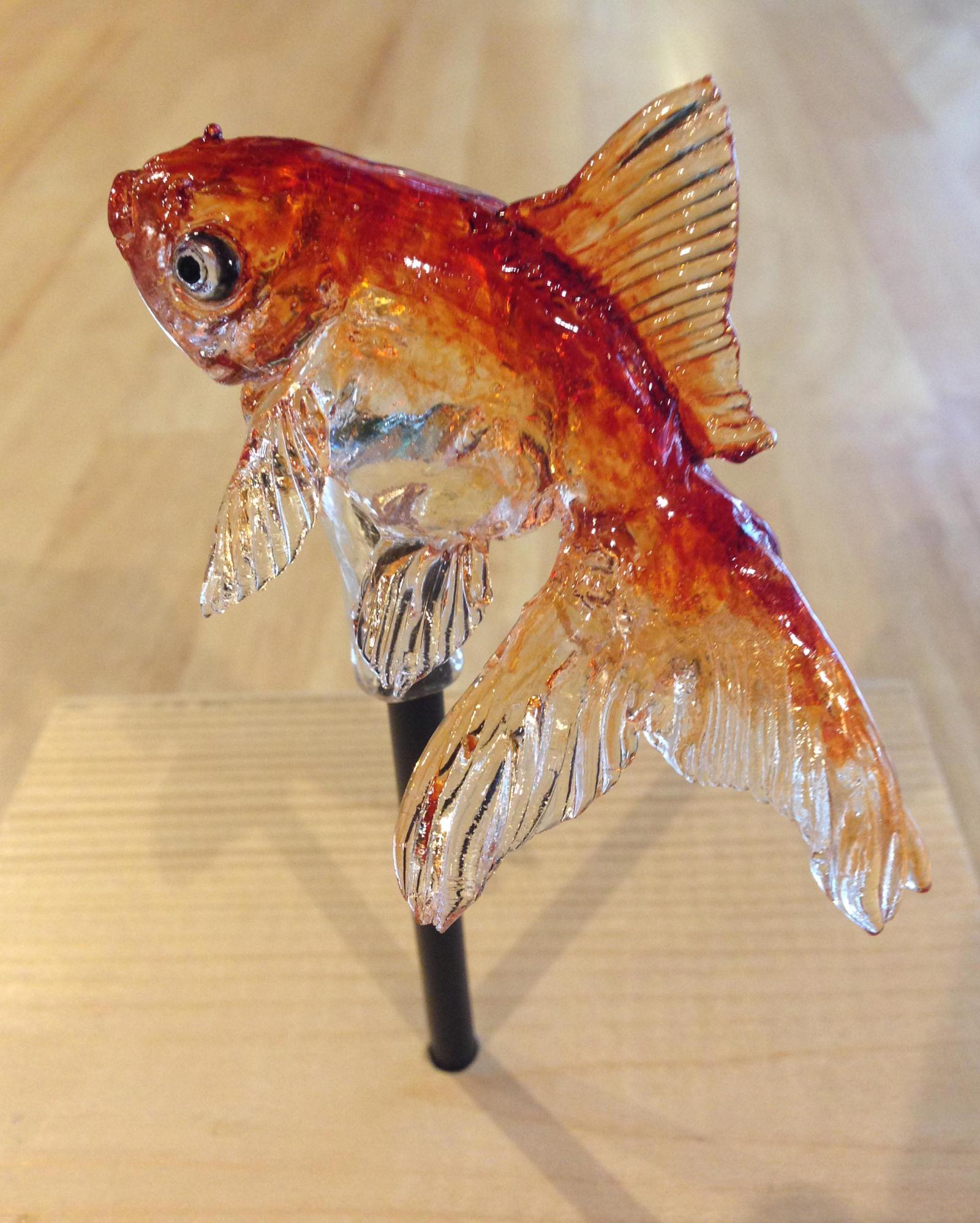
Amezaiku goldfish by Shinri Tezuka

Amezaiku (飴細工) is Japanese candy craft artistry. An artist takes multi-colored mizuame and, using their hands and other tools such as tweezers and scissors, creates a sculpture. Amezaiku artists also paint their sculpted candy with edible dyes to give the finished work more character. Animals, including goldfish and insects, are common amezaiku shapes created to appeal to children. Intricate animal characters are created with expert speed. Some amezaiku artists are also street performers who perform magic tricks and tell stories along with their candy craft entertainment.

== History ==
During the Heian period, the art of amezaiku was used in Japan for candy offerings made at temples in Kyoto. The amezaiku craft spread beyond the temple during the Edo period, when many forms of street performance flourished in Japan and when its base ingredient, mizuame, became widely available. In Edo it emerged in its present artistic form.

== Methods ==
The candy base is prepared beforehand, using a starchy syrup recipe that requires careful monitoring to ensure proper consistency and appearance. The mixture is kneaded and pulled by hand, and formed into a large ball to be stored until ready to use. At the stall, the candy ball is heated to make it pliable again. The artist puts their hand into the hot mass to pinch up the material necessary; this too is a skill, as the artist must learn to tolerate the painful heat of the medium. The hot candy is quickly rolled and mounted on a stick, then pulled, twisted and clipped into form, usually an animal of some kind and often intricate. Speed is necessary to the art since the sculpture must be completed before the candy cools and hardens again.

One method formerly used in sculpting amezaiku was blowing into the candy by means of a straw, similar to glass-blowing. This practice was eventually prohibited in Japan as unhygienic, although other means of introducing blown air may be used.

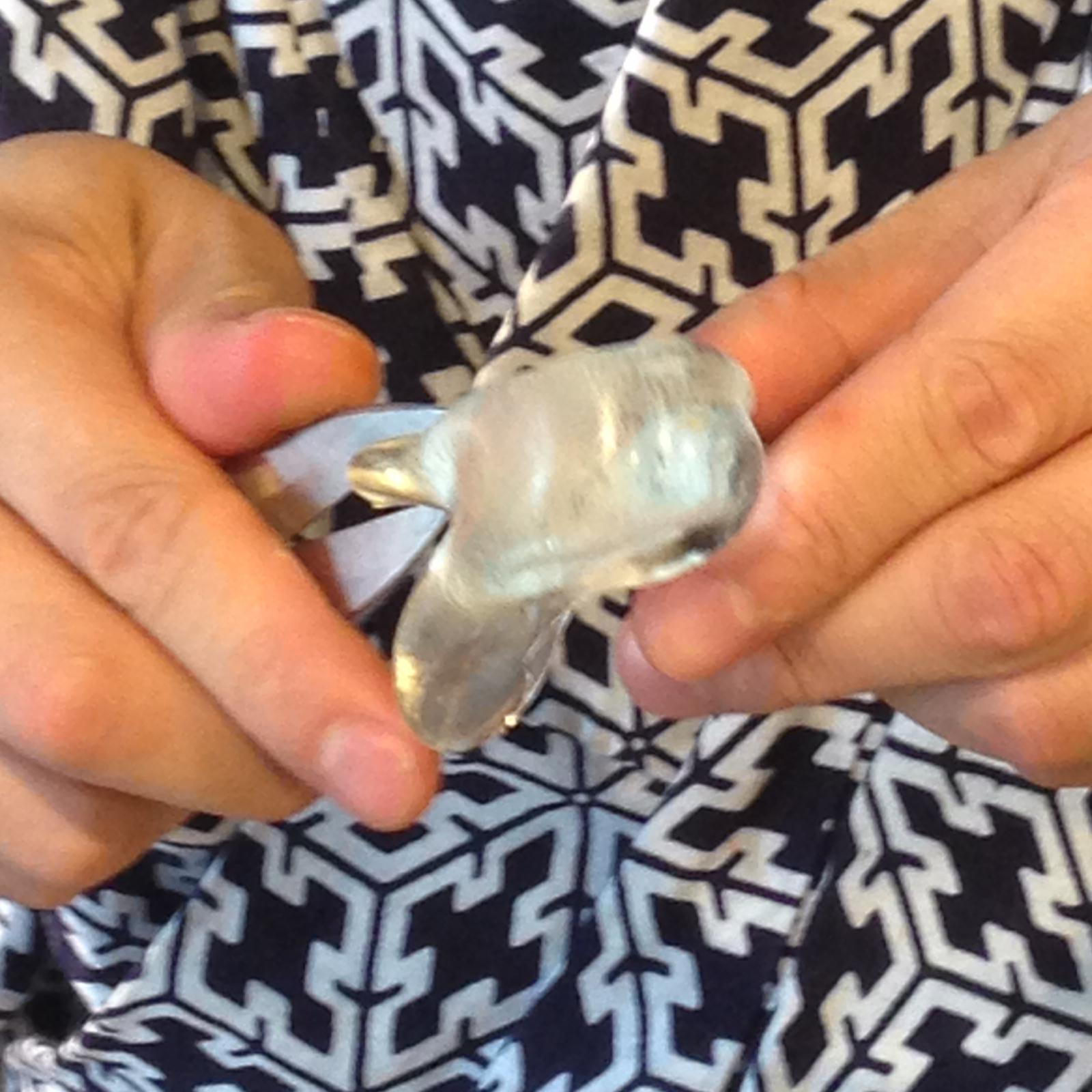

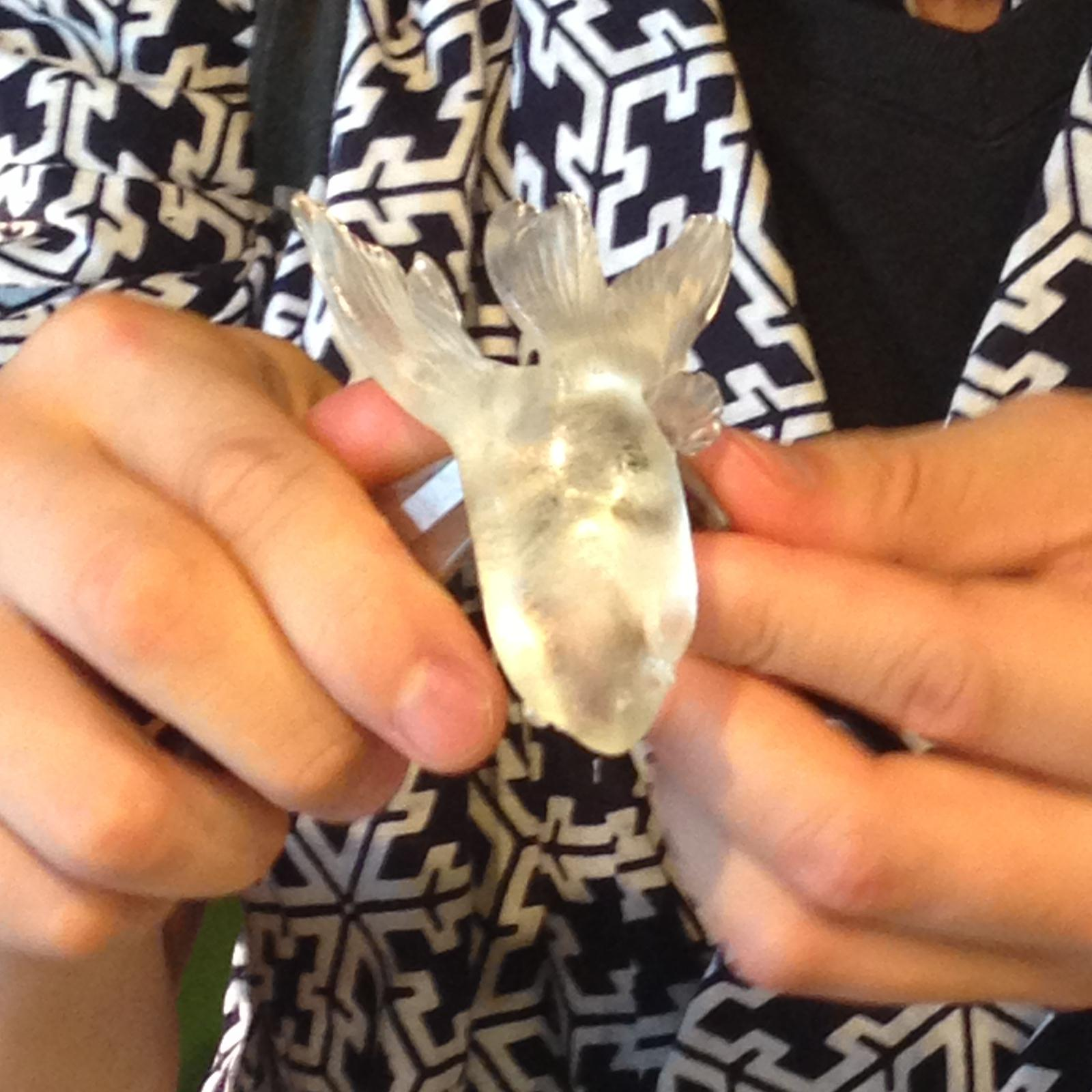

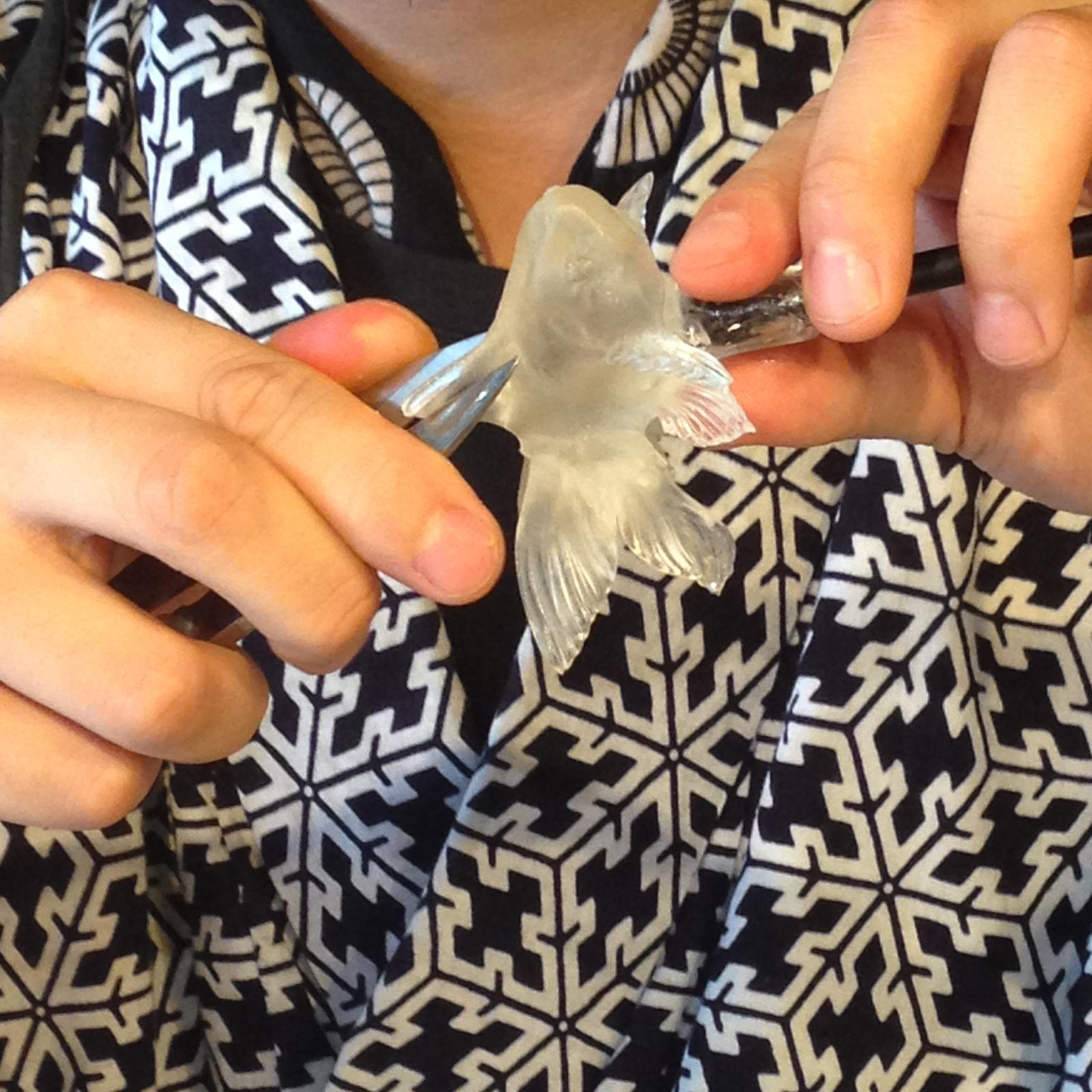

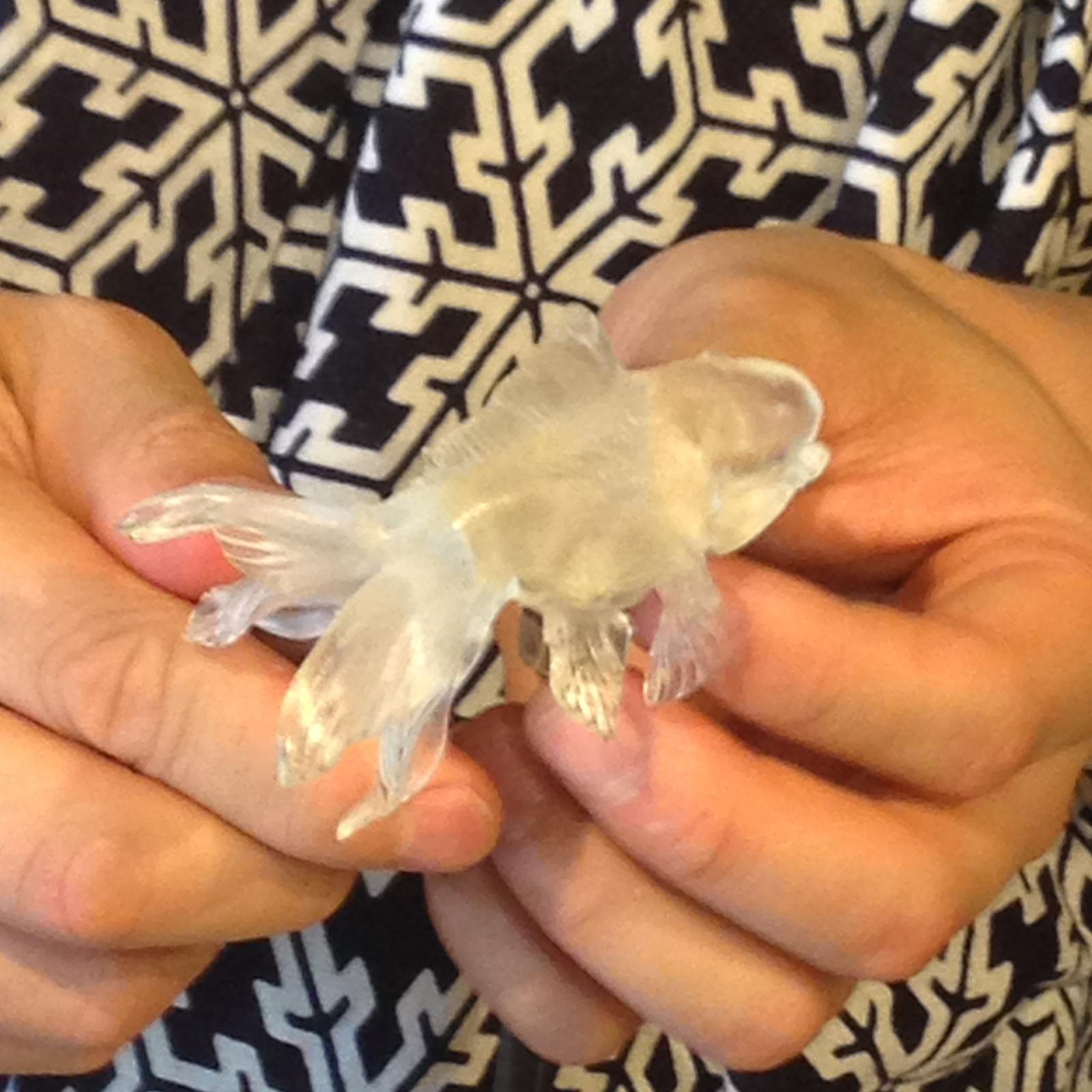

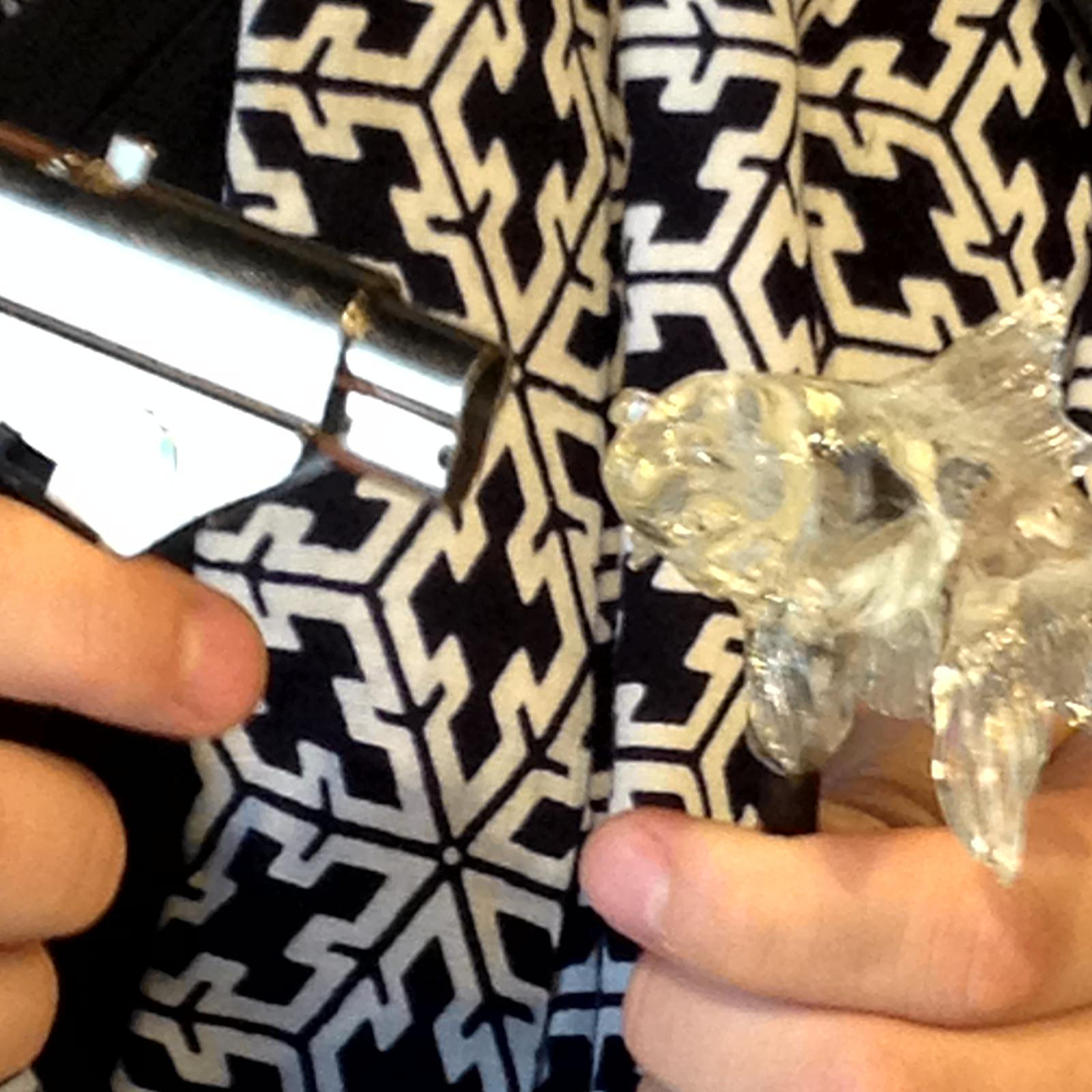

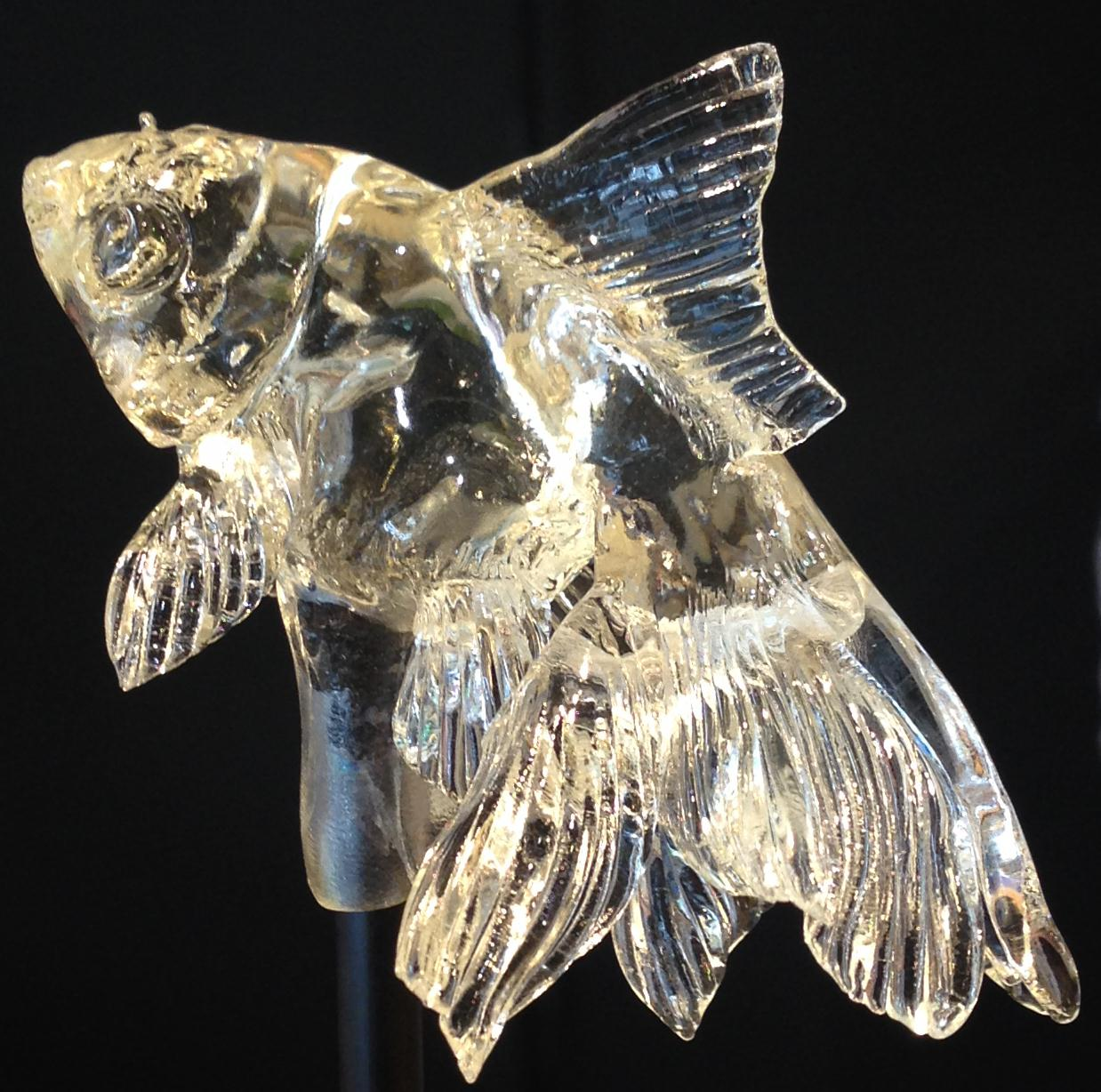

== See also ==
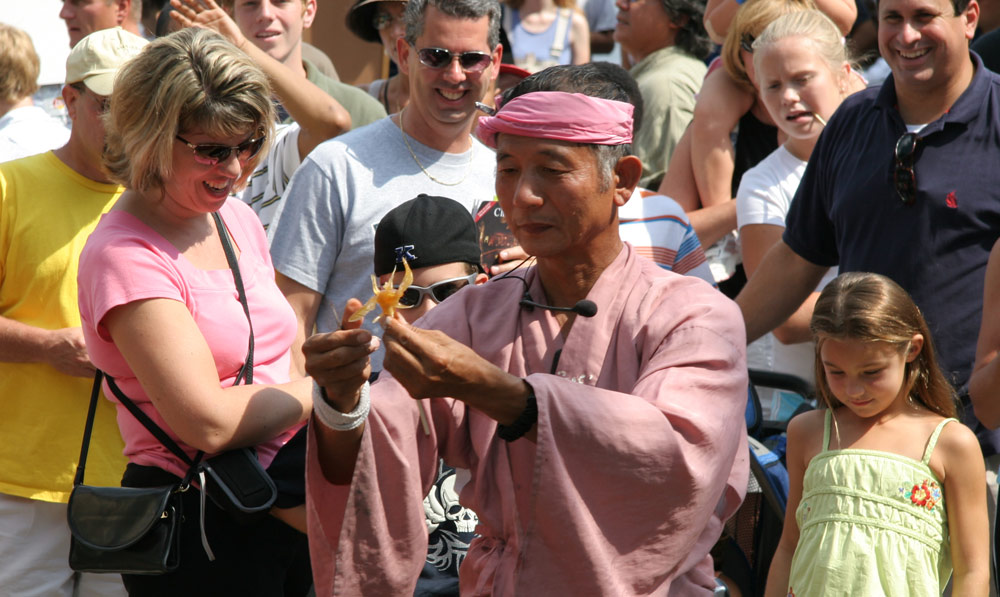
Amezaiku artist Masaji Terasawa performs at a Japanese festival

- Candy Miyuki
- Sugar sculpture
- Sugar people in China
- Tò he
