= Xiuhuaxie =

Traditional Chinese embroidered shoes with flat sole

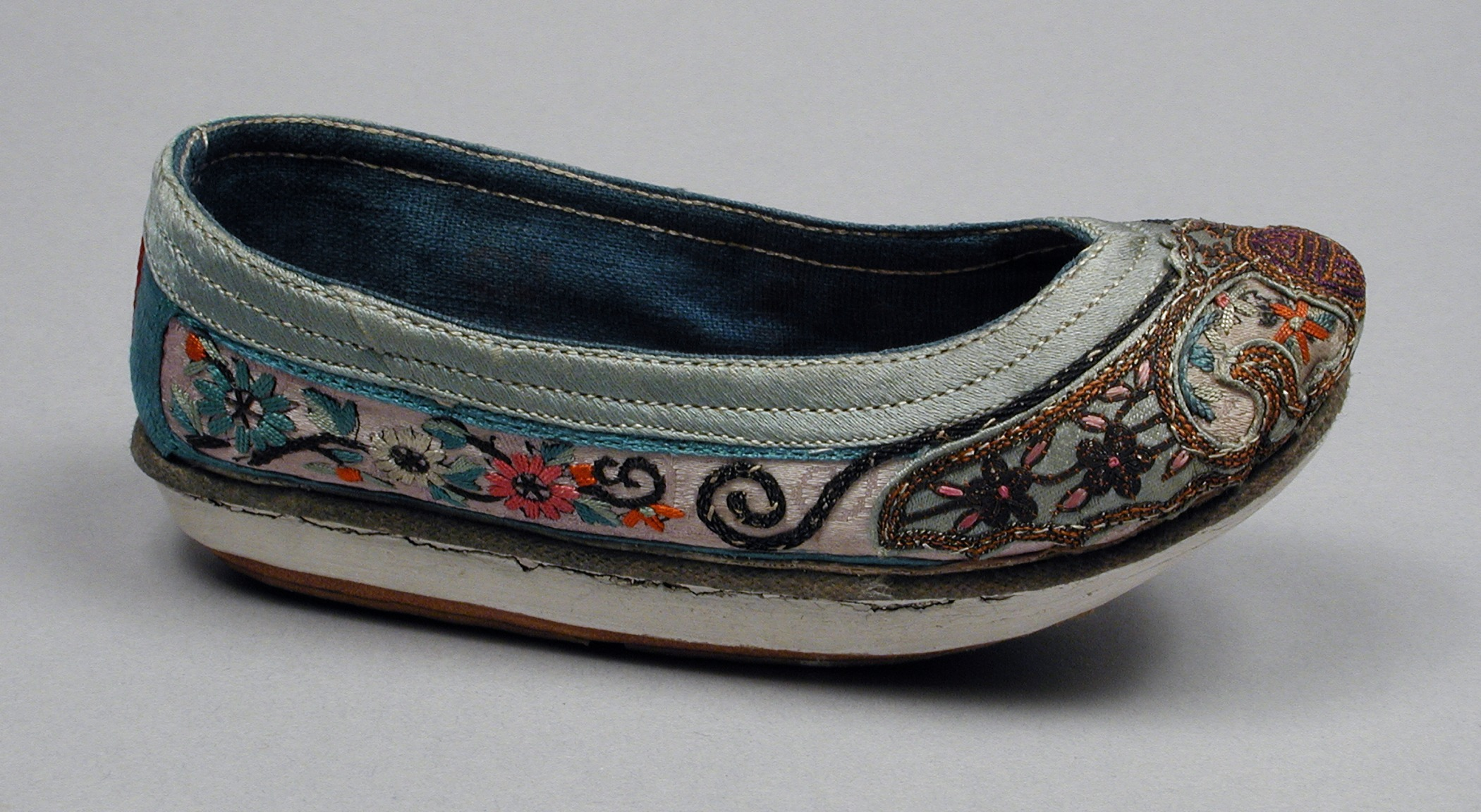

Chinese name
- Chinese: 绣花鞋
- Literal meaning: Embroidered shoes
Transcriptions
Standard Mandarin
- Hanyu Pinyin: Xiùhuāxié

English name
- English: Chinese shoes/ Chinese-style embroidered shoes/ Chinese slippers

Xiuhuaxie (Chinese: 绣花鞋; pinyin: xiùhuāxié; lit. 'embroidered shoes'), also known as Chinese shoes, Chinese-style embroidered shoes, and Chinese slippers, are a well-known sub-type of traditional Chinese cloth shoes (中国布鞋; zhōngguó bùxié); the xiuhuaxie are deeply rooted in Chinese culture and are characterized by its use of elaborate and colourful Chinese embroideries to create pattern on the shoes (including the shoe cover from heal to toe, the sole of the shoes, and even the shoe padding). The traditional handicraft of making xiuhuaxie is fully indigenous to China, having been created by Chinese people since the ancient times, and combines Chinese shoe culture and the art of Chinese embroidery. This craft is believed to have originated during the Spring and Autumn period about 2600 years ago in Shanxi province; the traditional craft was then handed down from generation to generation by Chinese women. Nowadays, the xiuhuaxie continue to be used as a type of footwear item in Hanfu, and are also used as traditional Chinese wedding shoes. Ethnic minorities in China also have their own styles of xiuhuaxie and their own traditional customs around these shoes.

== Cultural significance and tradition ==
The traditional social division of labour in ancient China has been based on the concept of nángēng nǚzhī (男耕女织; 'men plough', 'women weave'); a concept which existed since matrilineal society of ancient China was replaced by a patrilineal one. Chinese cloth shoes, which are an embroidered Slipper, has a history of more than 3000 years; and, although cloth shoes are rare in urban areas of China nowadays, this form of shoes remain an important irreplaceable aspect of Chinese along with Confucianism and Buddhism.

Chinese embroideries have reflected and expressed the subtle changes in aesthetic concepts, cultural traditions, ethics and morals of the Chinese people throughout the millennia. Similarly, the xiuhuaxie also reflect Chinese aesthetics through the use of beautiful embroidery patterns in the shoe cover. Basic embroideries patterns tend to be flowers, birds, animals, scenery, and figures from traditional Chinese opera; it can also be decorated with more auspicious patterns such lotus seeds, which symbolizes the birth of a child, pomegranate which symbolized multiple offspring, and the lóngfēifèngwǔ (龙飞凤舞; 'flying dragon and dancing phoenix'), which is a symbol of marital bliss.

=== Tradition ===
According to the popular Chinese tale, Jinguo Xie (晋国鞋), literally "Jin state shoes", Jin Xiangong expanded his territory by merging ten vassal states in 606 BC; and to immortalize his cultural and military achievements in the mind of the general population, he ordered that all women's shoes had to depict ten fruits or flower patterns; this patterns could include pomegranate blossoms, peach blossoms, grapes, etc; he also ordered that all civilian women had to wear the Shiguoxie (十果鞋; 'Ten fruits shoes') at their weddings, a tradition which had to be followed by the succeeding generations such that the future generations never forget his legacy. The Shiguoxie worn by women was thus also known Jinguo Xie at this period.

In the past, Han Chinese brides' sewing skills were best reflected in the making of shoes. For example, in Jinzhong county, Chinese brides used to sew and embroider shoes, known as kanxie (看鞋), prior to their wedding; these shoes would later be sent to the home of the groom one day before the wedding ceremony; the bride's mother-in-law, sister-in-law, and neighbours would then comment on the skills of the bride almost acting as judges.

== United States ==
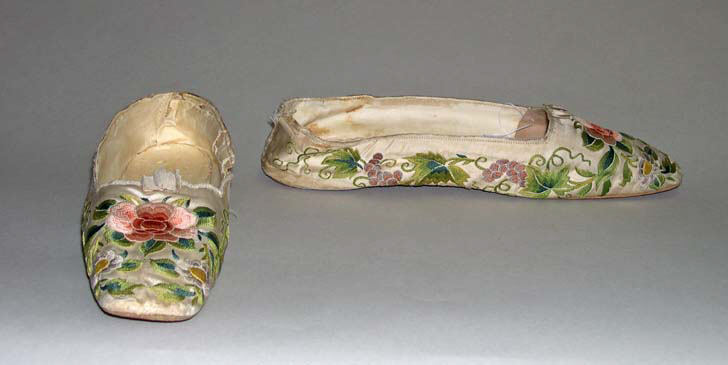
Chinese slippers, 1830–1859

In the early 20th century, the xiuhuaxie manufactured in China were imported to the United States where they were sold in American stores to American women as boudoir shoes; none of this imported xiuhuaxie were sold to Chinese people. Chinese shoes firms in the United States, on the other hand, would mainly sell the xiuhuaxie to Chinese people who were living in the United States. A tariff system was implemented in the United States in order to curb the sales of Chinese shoes in the United States; customs appraisers at that time would place a tariff of 60 per cent on these shoes as they were classified as articles of silk embroidery; this tariff was so large that it prevented the general sales of the xiuhuaxie in the United States.

== Related items ==
- Tiger-head shoes
- Lotus shoes
- Manchu platform shoes

== See also ==
- List of shoe styles
- Hanfu
- Hanfu footwear
