= Hanfu footwear =

Footwear worn in Hanfu

Hanfu also includes accessories, such as footwear. There were many etiquette which rule people's daily lives, and this included the use and etiquette of shoes and socks wearing.

== Shoes ==
Collectively, shoes are typically called lü (履) since the Han dynasty. In the Qin dynasty, shoes were referred as ju (屦). The word xie (鞋) eventually replaced the word lü to become a general name for shoes.

Since the ancient times, Chinese shoes came in various kinds; there were leather shoes (made of tanbark and pelt), cloth shoes (made of silk, hemp, damask, brocade, and crepe), and straw shoes (made of leaves and stems of cattail, corn leaves, and kudzu), ji (屐; wooden clogs). Han Chinese typically wore lü (regular shoes), xi (shoes with thick soles), and ji (wooden clogs). Different shoes were worn based on their appropriateness for specific occasions; shoes also denoted the social ranks of its wearers. Lü (履) were worn for formal occasions whereas ji (屐) was used for informal occasions.

Types of Footwear
Name		Definition	Description	Period	Images
Ju (屦)		Shoes	Some shoes worn in Qin were square-headed; they were generally worn by archers.	Qin dynasty	
Lü (履) or Xie (鞋)	Xieqiao (鞋翘) or Yuntouxie(云头鞋)	Curled up Shoe	Some ancient Chinese shoes had curled up-shoes, i.e. shoes with rising toe caps, and could come in different shapes, such as tiger heads and phoenixes.	Han – Unknown	
Lü (履) or Xie (鞋)	Cailu (草履) or caixie (草鞋)	Straw shoes, or straw sandals.	Straw shoes were worn by almost all people in ancient China regardless of social ranks; nomadic tribes were the exception. Different types of leaves and leaves would be woven together to create these types of shoes.	Ancient-modern	
Lü (履) or Xie (鞋)	Lianlü (蓮履)	Lotus shoes	Lotus shoes were worn by women who had bound feet. Exact date of origin is unknown. Based on folk stories, it may have appeared in the Five dynasties period or in the Sui dynasty.	Unknown – Modern	
Lü (履) or Xie (鞋)	Hutou xie (虎头鞋)	Tiger-head shoes	Also known as "tiger shoes". These shoes were worn by Han Chinese Chinese children to scare off bad spirits. They are usually worn along with the tiger head hat. They vary in styles depending on regional culture.	Unknown – present day	Child's shoes, China, Shanghai, Qing dynasty, 1800s AD – Östasiatiska museet, Stockholm – DSC09539
Lü (履) or Xie (鞋)	Xiuhua xie (繡花鞋)	Embroidered shoes	Also known as Chinese shoes, Chinese-style embroidered shoes, and Chinese slippers, are a well-known sub-type of traditional Chinese cloth shoes (中国布鞋);There are many shoe styles. The xiuhuaxie are characterized by its use of elaborate and colourful Chinese embroideries to create pattern on the shoes.The traditional handicraft of making xiuhuaxie is fully indigenous to China.	Spring and Autumn period – present day	
Ji (屐)	Wooden Clogs were shoes with two bars running perpendicular under the sole.		In Han dynasty, clogs were used on women's wedding day; they were decorated with colourful designs and ribbons.		
Ji (屐)	Wooden Clogs were shoes with two bars running perpendicular under the sole.		In the Jin dynasty, a new type of clogs were made. The sole, upper and bars were made with a single, whole piece of wood.		
Ji (屐)	Wooden Clogs were shoes with two bars running perpendicular under the sole.		A clog with removable bars, called "Lord Xie Shoe"; it was called after the Southern dynasties period poet Xie Lingyun whose creation of the shoe is attributed to.		
Ji (屐)	Xueji (靴屐)	Boot-like clogs	The clogs which were worn in Southern China gradually became more boot-like after the Tang dynasty.		
Xue (靴)		Leather boots	Leather boots were introduced by King Wuling of Zhao. They were generally worn by generals and cavalrymen in Qin dynasty. The Han Chinese also made women's boots. In the Northerners wore leather boots when horseback riding in the Northern and Southern dynasties.	Zhou-Present day	

=== Gallery ===
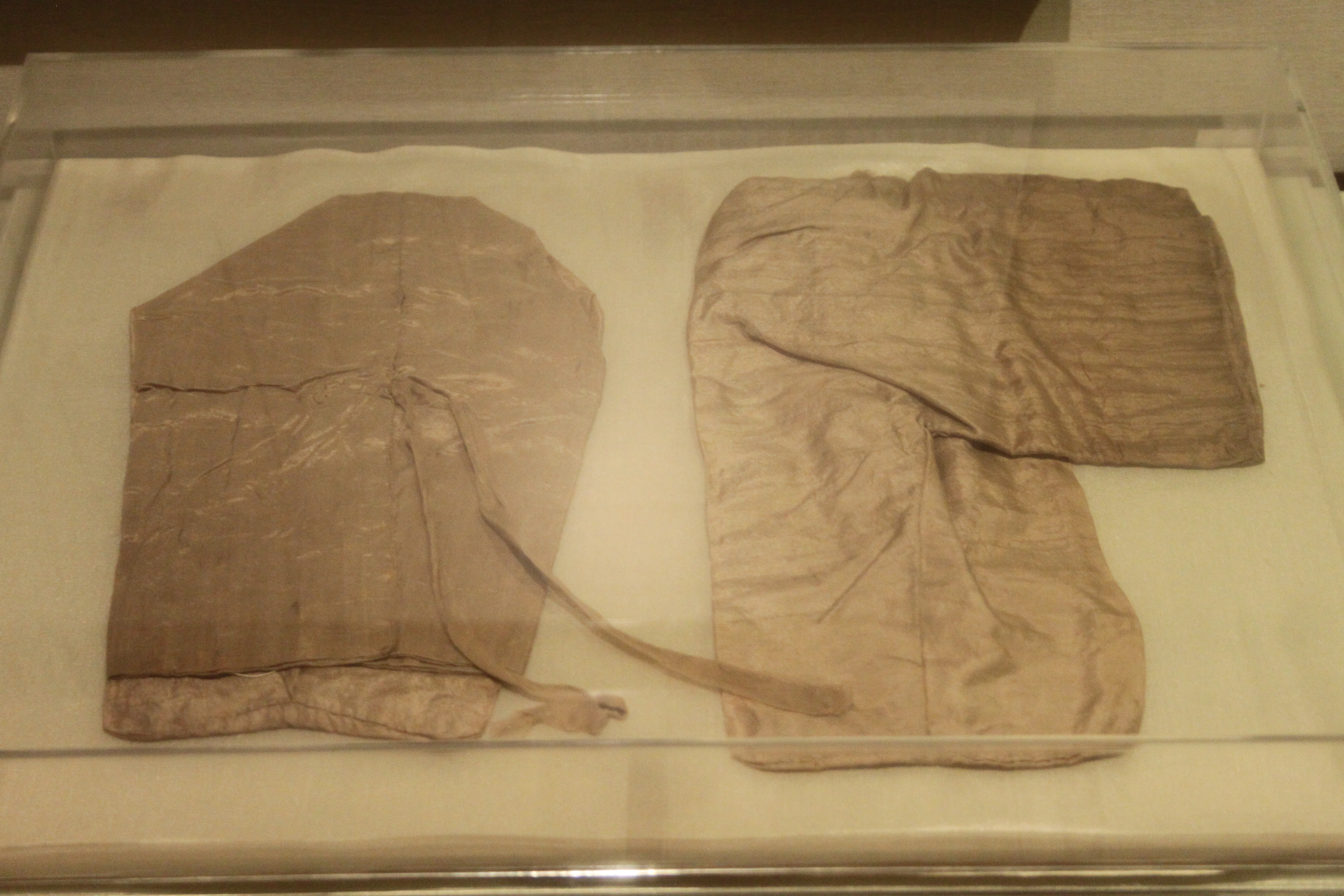
Han socks, Mawangdui Tomb, Han dynasty.

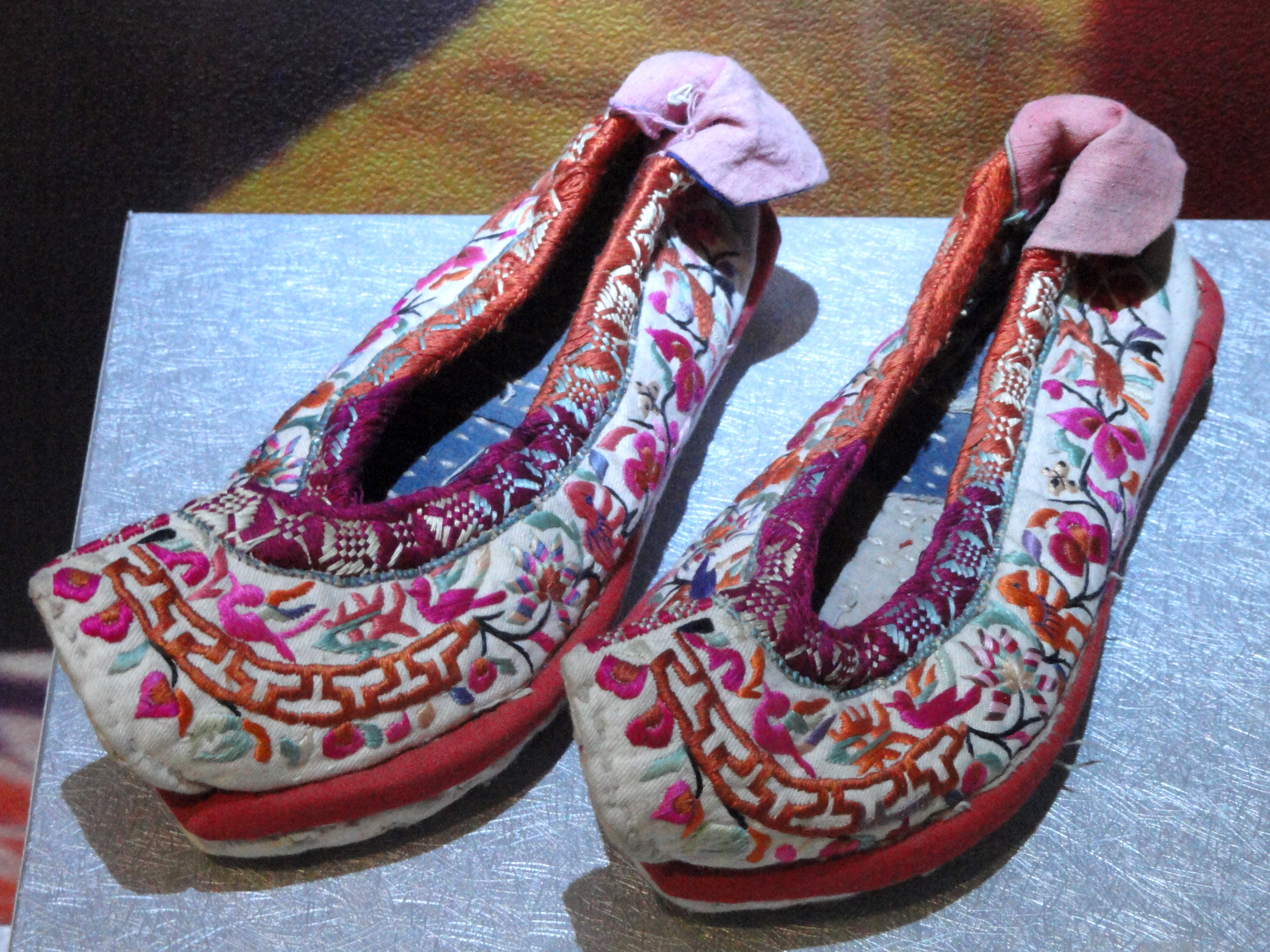
Yuntouxie

== See also ==
- List of shoe styles
- Flowerpot shoe, intended to mimic the gait of lotus shoes
- Hanfu and List of Hanfu
- Lotus shoes and Xiuhuaxie
