= Maohou =

Chinese folk art form

Maohou is a Chinese folk art form, and a form of Miniature Art. Artists build miniature sculptures using cicada sloughs and Magnolia buds. An old Beijing art form, Maohou sculpture came into being during the Qing dynasty. Legend has it that a Beijing herbal medicine shopkeeper designed such miniature toys for his son using the two traditional medicine ingredients since he was too poor to buy any toys.

== Typical sculpture ==
The most common Maohou sculptures feature dancing or posturing monkeys, with Magnolia buds used for making its body, cicada torso used for the limbs, and cicada antennae used for the tail. In fact, the original medicine shop initially sold the materials for making Maohou as houliao (which literally translates to material for making monkeys).

== Notable artist ==
Qiu Yisheng is a folk artist whose Maohou sculptures have brought the art recognition and international media attention. His work Temple Fair in Changdian was displayed at the National Museum of China. His latest project focuses on sculptures of Olympic athletes in commemoration of the 2008 Olympic Games in Beijing.

== Etymology of derivative words ==
Maohou monkey is a euphemism for a little child in Mandarin.
