= Mian ren (flour figure) =

Mian ren is a form of traditional Chinese folk art. Flour figures are made of coloured rice flours, colouring, stone wax and honey. Craftsmen can make lively figures out of the coloured flour balls with a small bamboo knife. They used to carry their tools around villages and towns to sell them for a very basic living. Sometimes flour figures are used in dishes as food crafts along with vegetable carvings.

Flour figures were considered as little delights not found in elegant imperial staterooms. They are mainly collected by children as toys.

== Origin ==
The origin of the specific craft is unknown. According to archaeological discoveries figures of humans and pigs were found in Xinjiang province tombs. They are considered more than 1,340 years old. In a Southern Song period book called Dongjing Meng Hua Lu (Dreams of Splendor of the Eastern Capital), mian ren was defined as a food ornament that could be eaten as a snack.
