= Chinese folk art =

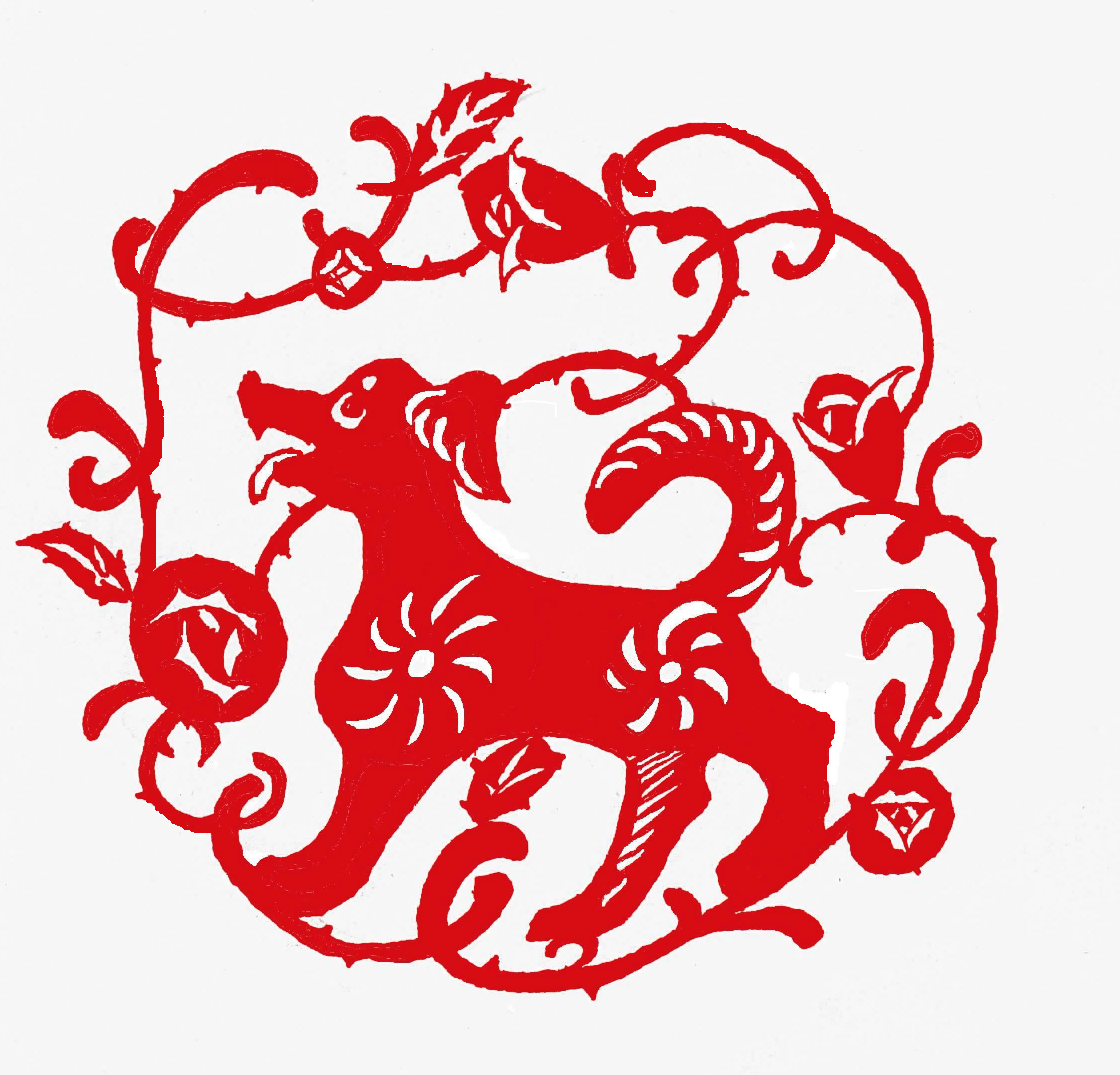
Paper cutting for a Year of the Dog celebration.

Chinese folk art or Chinese handcrafts are artistic forms inherited from a regional or ethnic scene in China. Usually there are some variation between provinces. Individual folk arts have a long history, and many traditions are still practiced today. The general definition of folk art incorporates Chinese art forms that are not classified as Chinese fine art.

Chinese folk art is the ancient forms of art that originated in China. Some of these ancient art forms include jade carvings, performance art such as music and their respective instruments, textile art such as basket weaving, paper art and clothing.

== Sculpture ==
=== Jade carving ===
Jade is a semi-rare green mineral found in prominent use in Chinese art since prehistoric times. Carvings using jade have been a common elevated folk art in China. From objects such as masks to animals, jade—along with cheaper wood and bamboo—found use in many works of art. At times, the highest quality jade has been esteemed more highly than gold, diamonds, or pearls. Due to the toughness of jade, it is believed that Chinese jade carvings were first carved into weapons such as swords, although it is unclear if the sword carvings were for ceremonial or utilitarian use. As time went on, jade was carved into many different shapes and forms. An important early example of jade carving were the circular disks known as bi, generally understood to represent the heavens in some fashion. By 3000 BC, jade was referred to yu (玉). By 206 BC, Xu Shen—a Chinese scholar under the Han—listed the Five Virtues of Jade as benevolence, honesty, wisdom, integrity, and bravery. It further represents love, strength, purity, luck, and gentleness. Jade is also used in fengshui, adding harmony and balance to its space.

=== Fruit pit carving ===
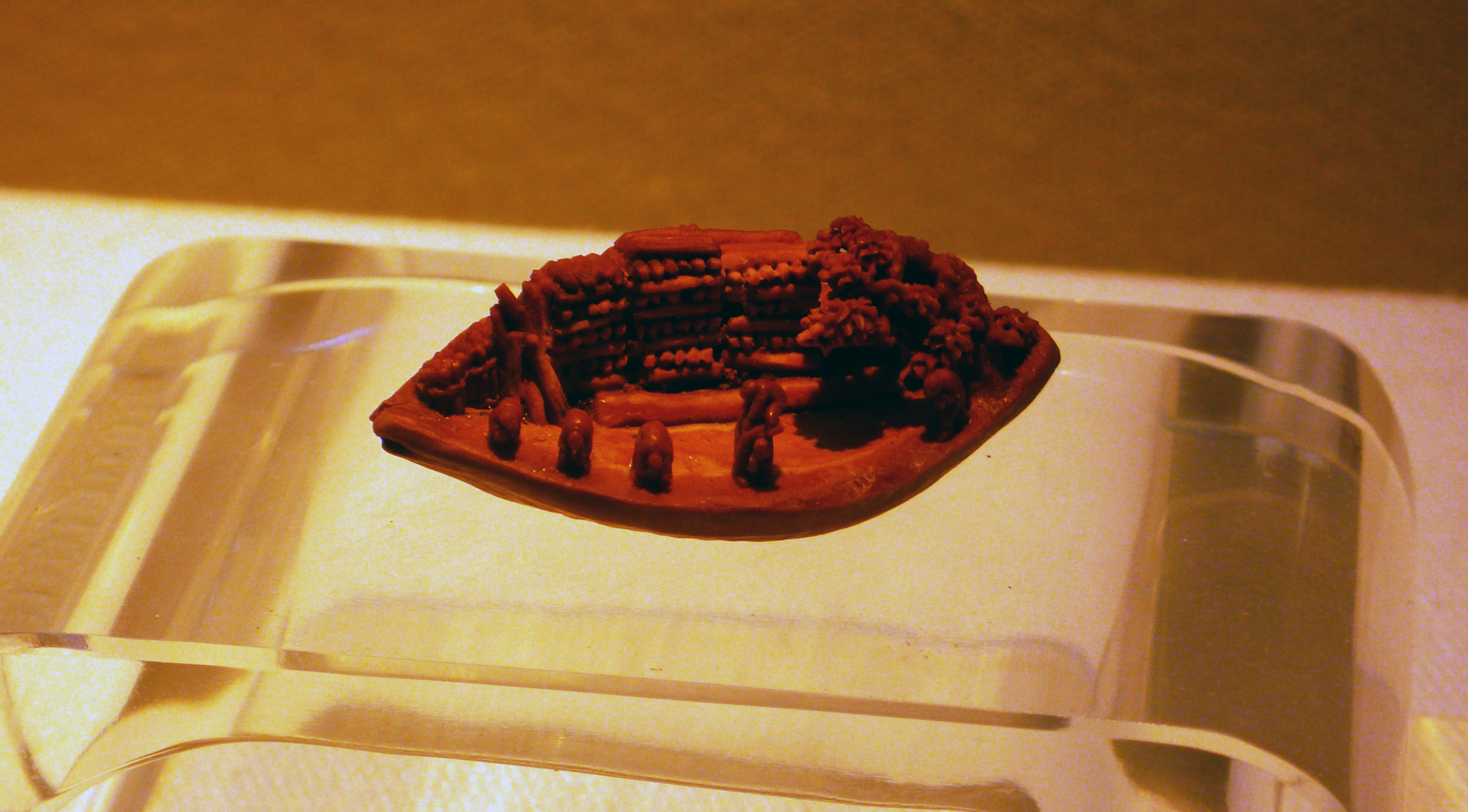
A carved Chinese olive pit at the Hangzhou Arts and Crafts Museum

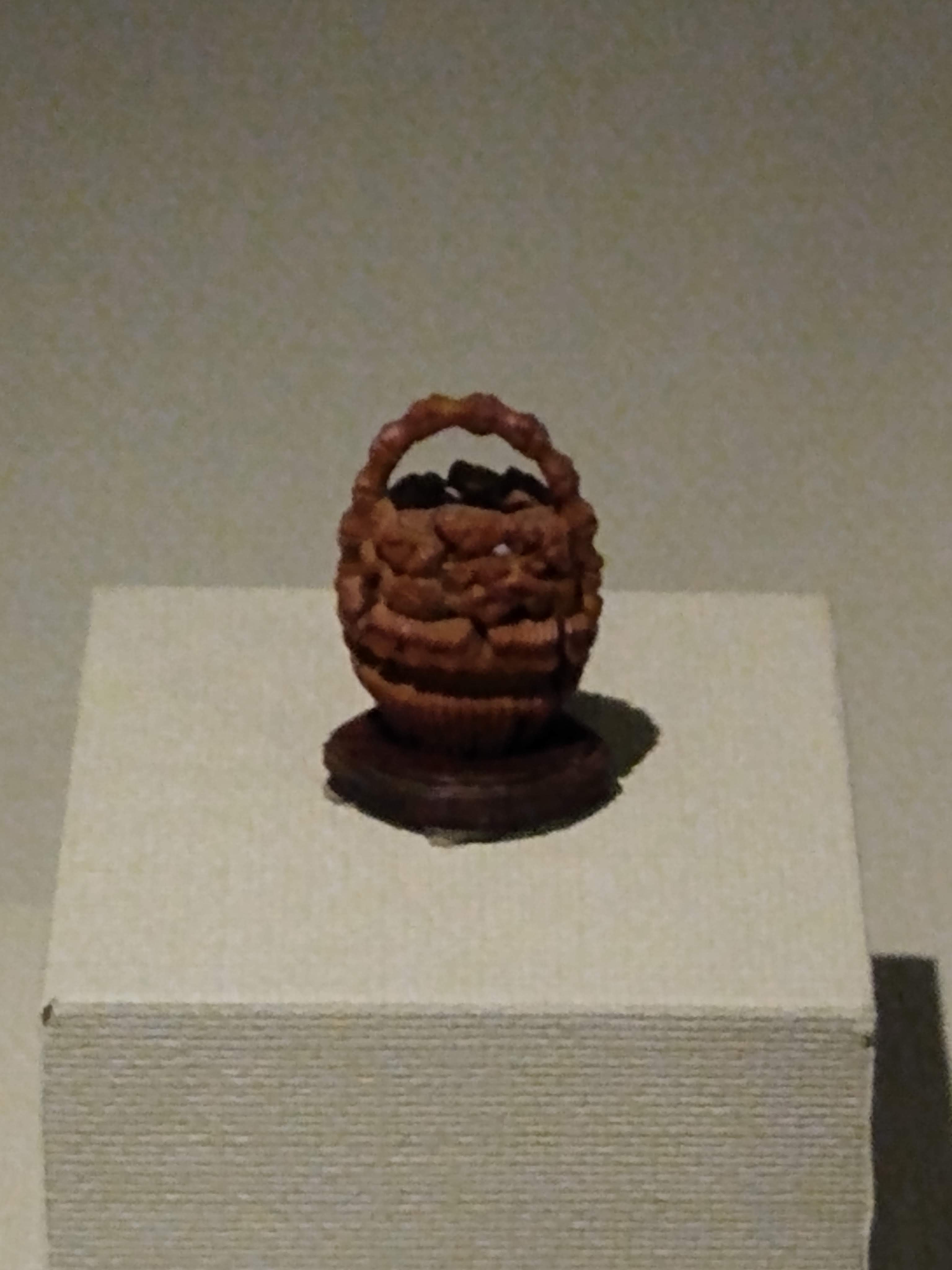
A carved peach pit at the National Palace Museum in Taipei

Fruit pit carving (Chinese: 核雕; pinyin: hédiāo) is a Chinese folk handicraft in which the pits of peach, apricot, walnut, Chinese olive, yumberry and other drupes are used to create minute patterns of the Buddha, nature, or the Chinese zodiac that are said to repel evil spirits. The carved pits are also used to create jewelry and decorations. However, the art is now facing extinction because few black olive trees are planted in China and there are very few people interested in learning this art. Olive core carving has been recognized as an Intangible Cultural Heritage of the Guangdong Province of China.

== Basket weaving ==
Baskets are mainly woven with bamboo or plant stems.

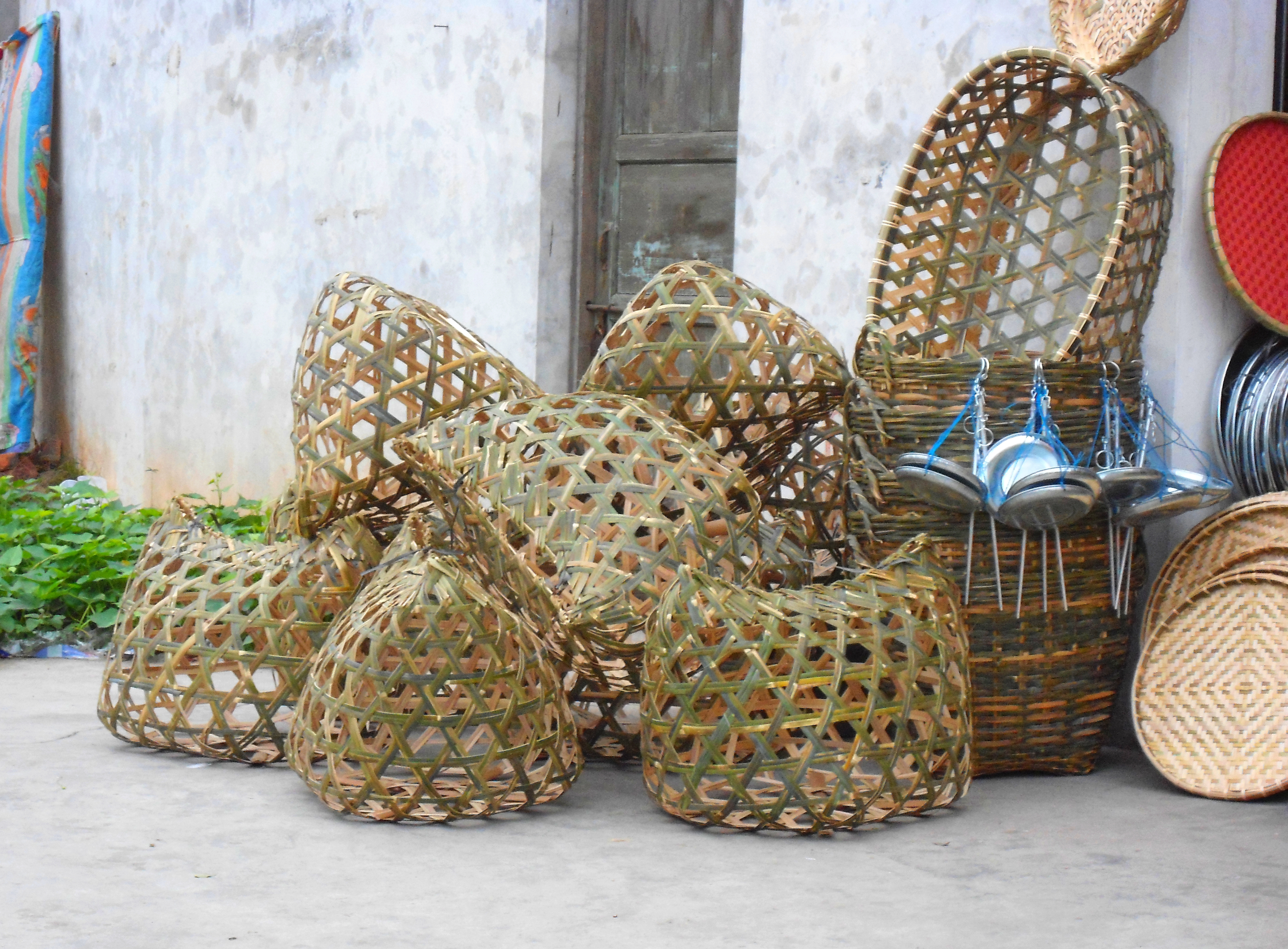
Baskets in Haikou City, Hainan Province, China.

== Chinese kites ==
China is the birthplace of the kite, and Weifang is one of the chief places where Chinese kites originated. Kite-flying became prevalent in Weifang in the Song dynasty (960–1279). By the Ming dynasty (1368–1644) kite-flying had become even more popular, and kite fairs on a rather large scale had appeared. Kites were sold not only across Shandong, but also to Jiangsu, Fujian, Anhui and other places. The noted English scholar Joseph Needham listed kites in his book History of Science and Technology in China as one of the important contributions in science and technology that the Chinese introduced to Europe.

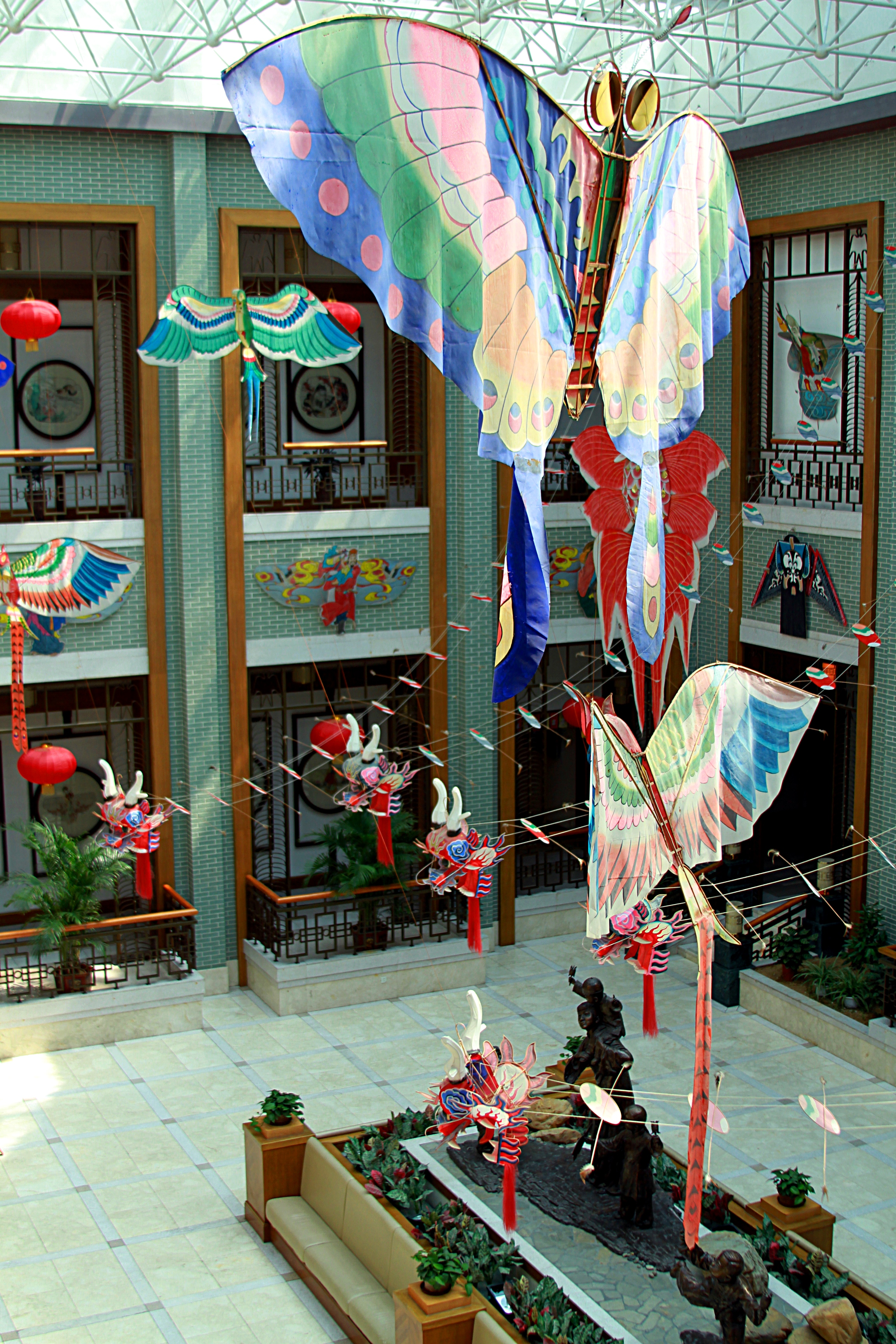
Photograph of the entrance hall of the Kite Museum in Weifang, Shandong, China.

== Food art ==
=== Sugar ===
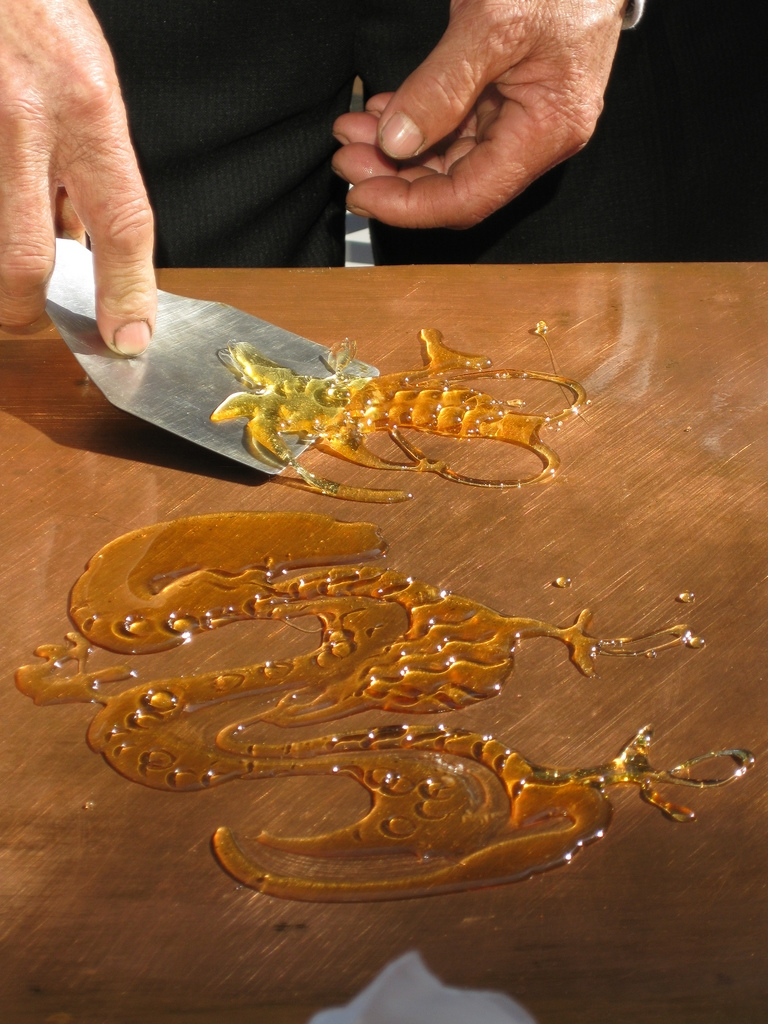
Sugar painting

Sugar painting (t 糖畫, s 糖画, tánghuà) is a form of traditional Chinese folk art using hot, liquid sugar to create two dimensional objects on a marble or metal surface.

Sugar people (糖人) is a traditional Chinese form of folk art using hot, liquid sugar to create three-dimensional figures.

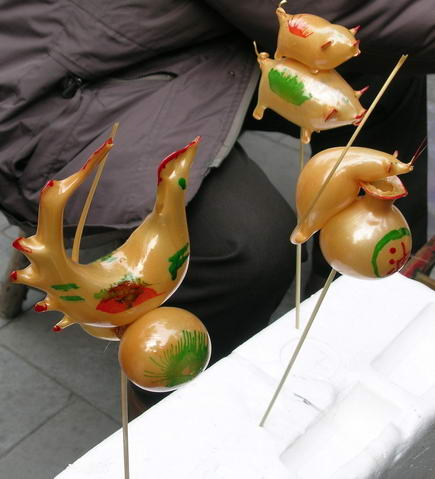
Sugar figures

=== Flour figures ===
Mian Ren (Flour Figure) are made of coloured flours. Craftsmen used to travel with their tools to villages and towns to make and sell flour figures for a very basic income. Sometimes flour figures are used in dishes together with vegetable carvings.

== Paper art ==
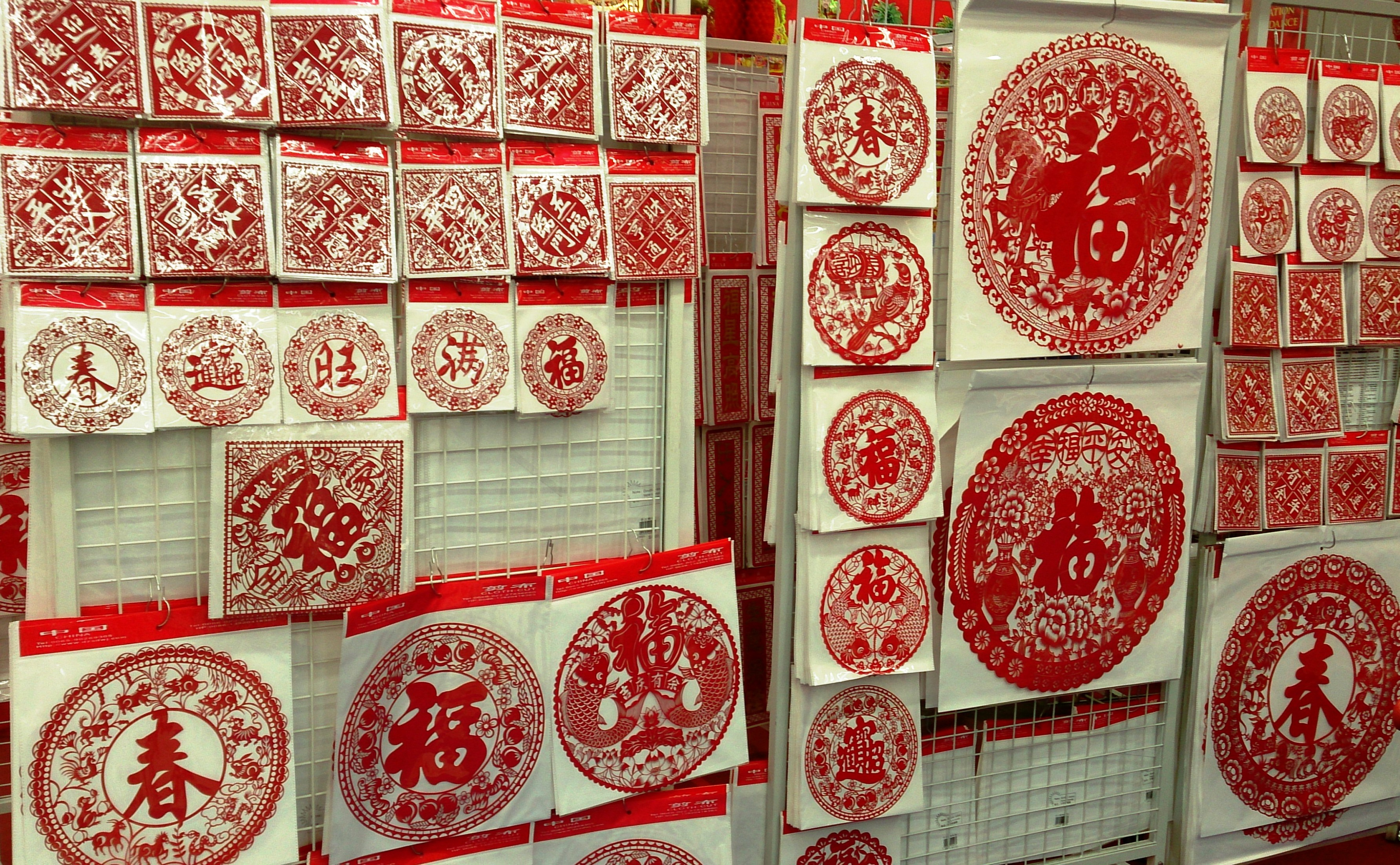
Paper cuttings

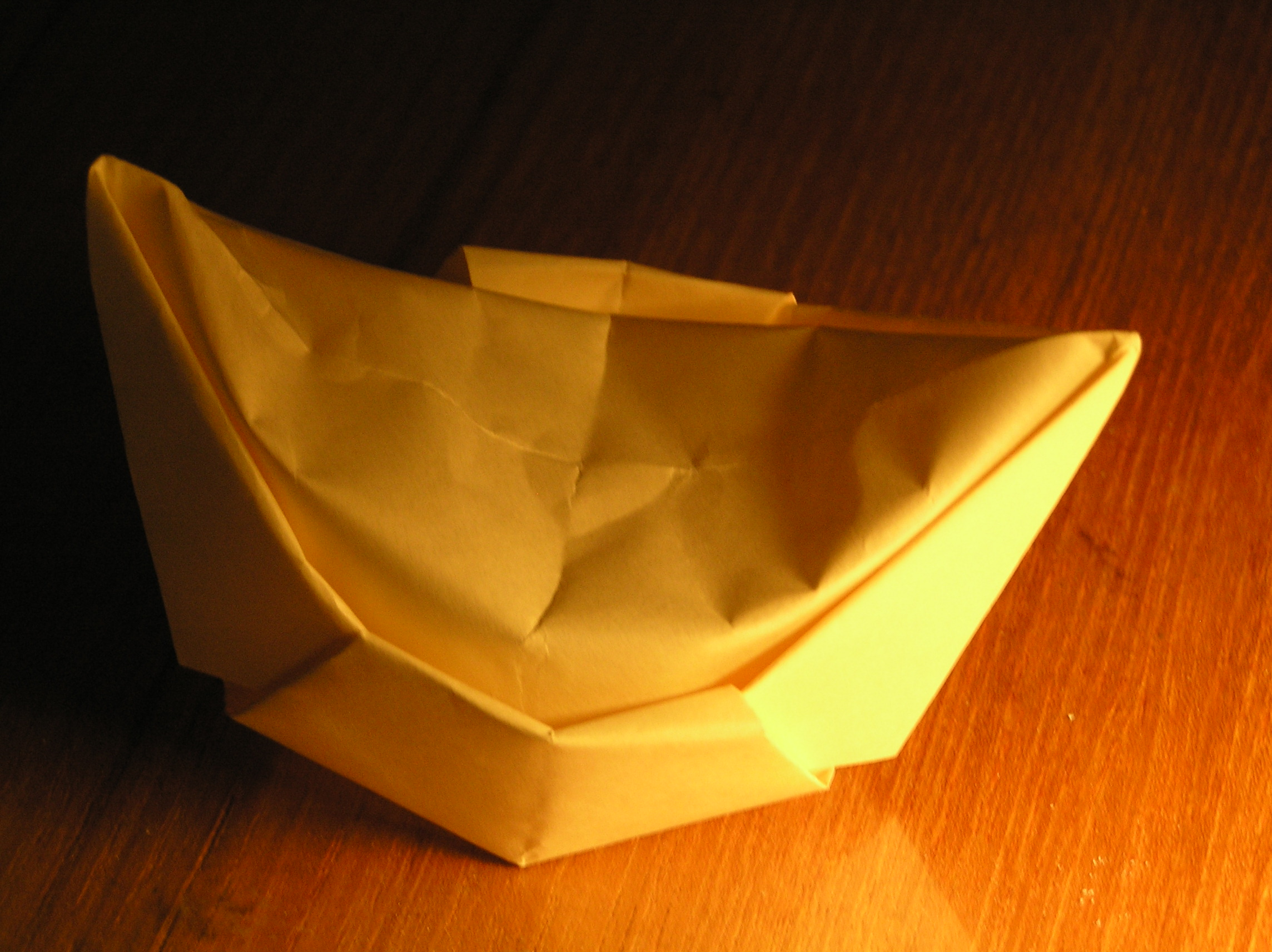
Traditional paper folding

The first two forms of paper art began in the Han dynasty with Chinese paper cutting and Chinese paper folding, together with the hand fan and pinwheel (toy).

Chinese paper cutting (剪纸, jianzhi) is a type of folk art that has roots in China during the 6th century and is attributed to Cai Lun during the Han Dynasty.

Known to be very intricate with the use of negative space, paper cutting is used for mostly decorative reasons, appearing on mirrors, lanterns, walls, etc.

In most cities and Chinatowns, paper art will adorn many street corners, business fronts, and inside buildings.

== Performances ==
=== Puppetry ===
One of the oldest forms of folk art is puppetry. Puppeteers use various kinds of puppets, including marionettes, glove puppets, rod puppets, cloth puppets and wire puppets in performances incorporating folk songs and dances over some dialogues. The subject matter is derived mainly from children's stories and fables.

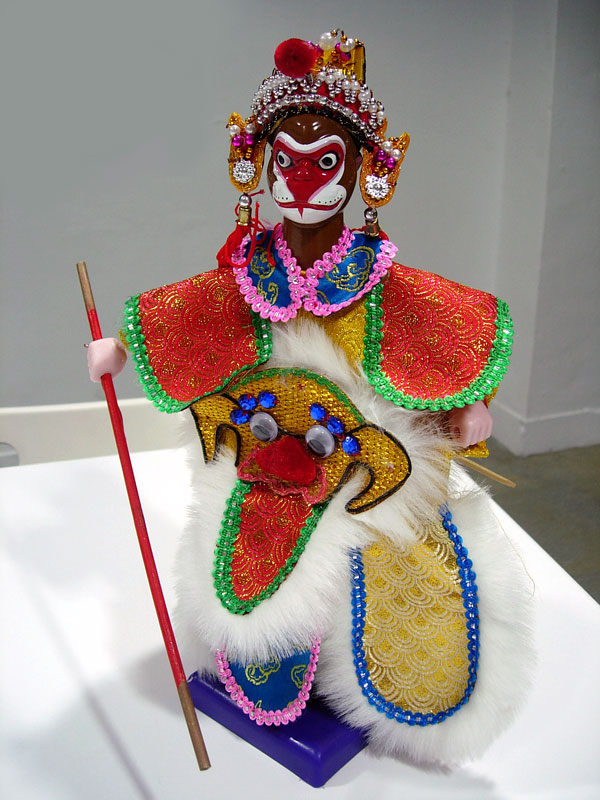

=== Shadow play ===
Shadow plays are a form of puppetry that is performed by moving figures made of animal skins or cardboard held behind a screen lit by lamplight. The subject matter and singing style in shadow plays are closely related to Chinese opera, except without using live actors or actresses. This art style was passed down from master to apprentice until recently. The most common troupe roster is one puppeteer, one singer, and a band of musicians. Shadow puppetry was banned by the government in 1966 during the Cultural Revolution, but allowed back in the late 1970s.

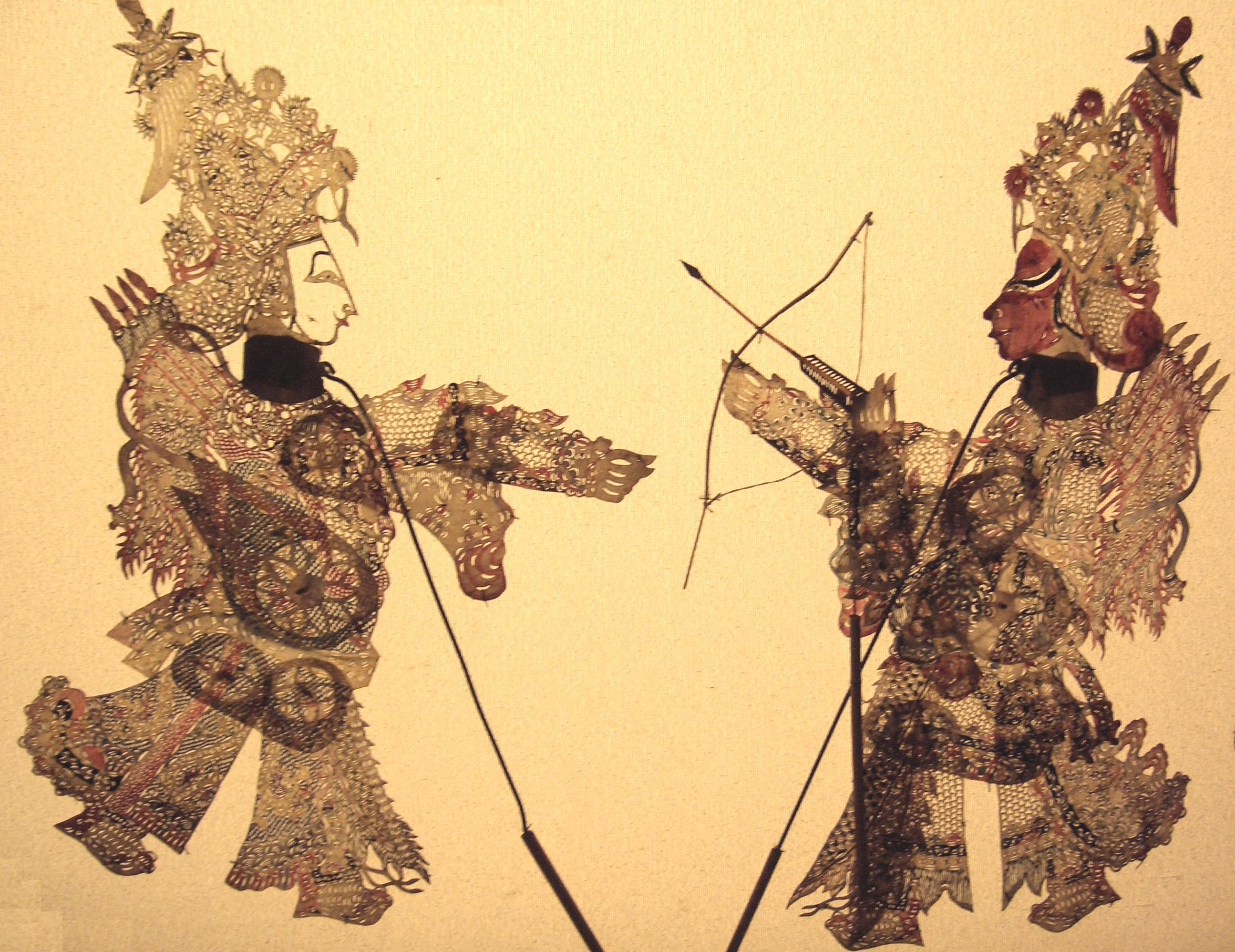
Chinese Shadow Play Figures, Two warriors; Qianlong era set; approx. 1780, Deutsches Ledermuseum, Offenbach, Germany

== Textile arts ==
=== Chinese knot ===
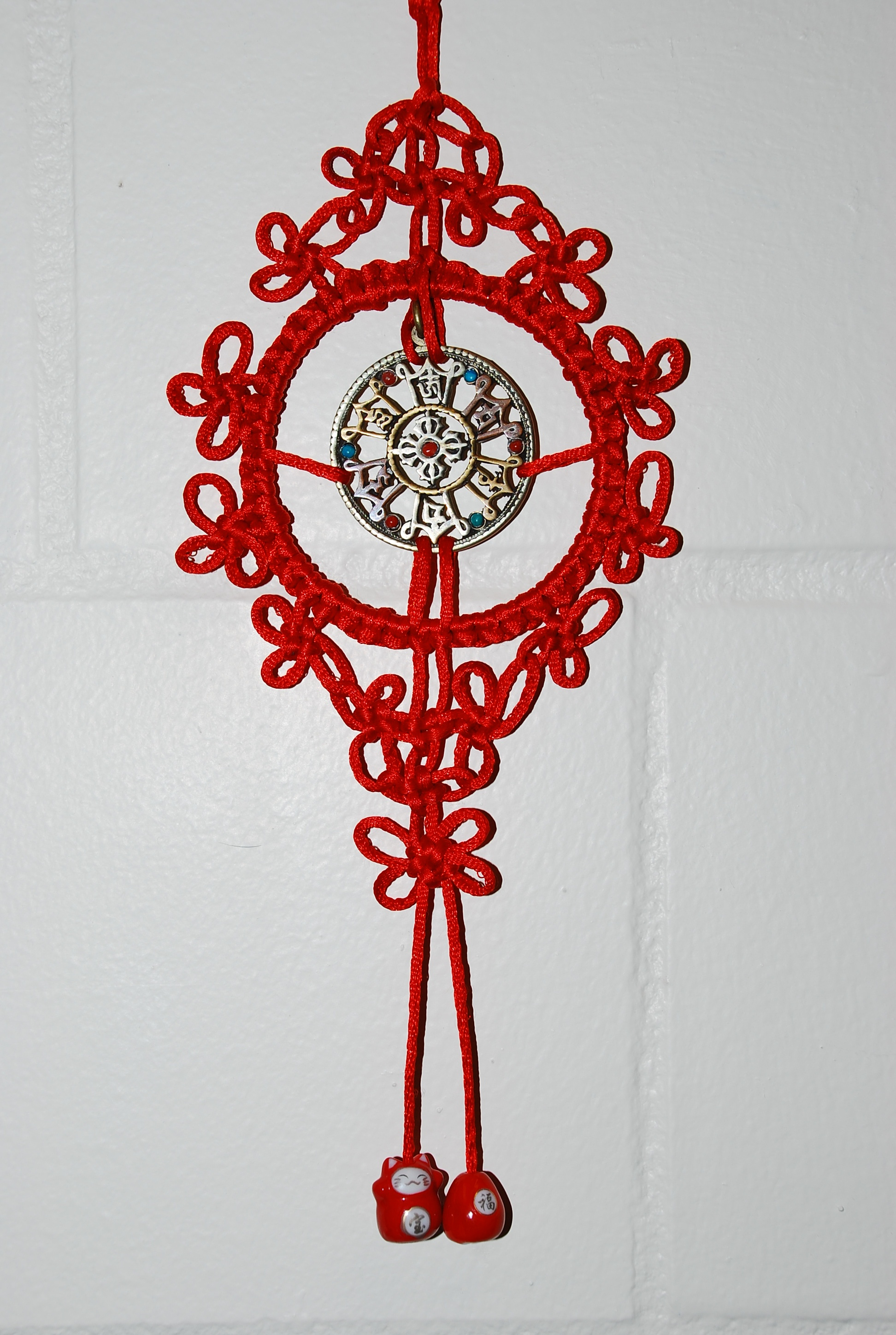

Chinese knotting (中國結) is a decorative handicraft art that began as a form of Chinese folk art in the Tang and Song dynasty (AD 960–1279) in China. It was later popularized in the Ming. The art is also referred to as Chinese traditional decorative knots. One of the more traditional art forms, it creates decorative knot patterns. It was not practiced during the Culture Revolution, but nowadays it is very popular again.

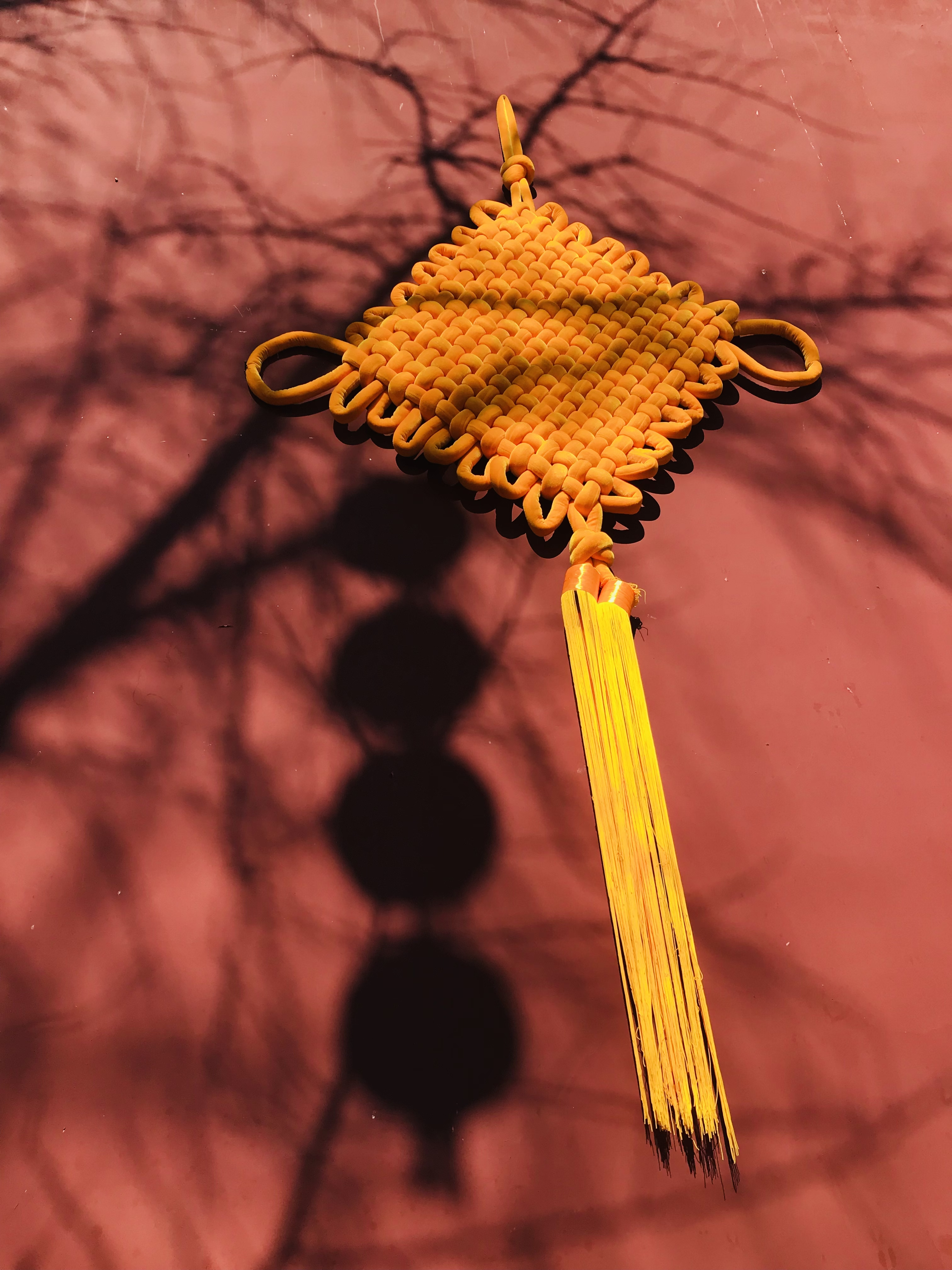

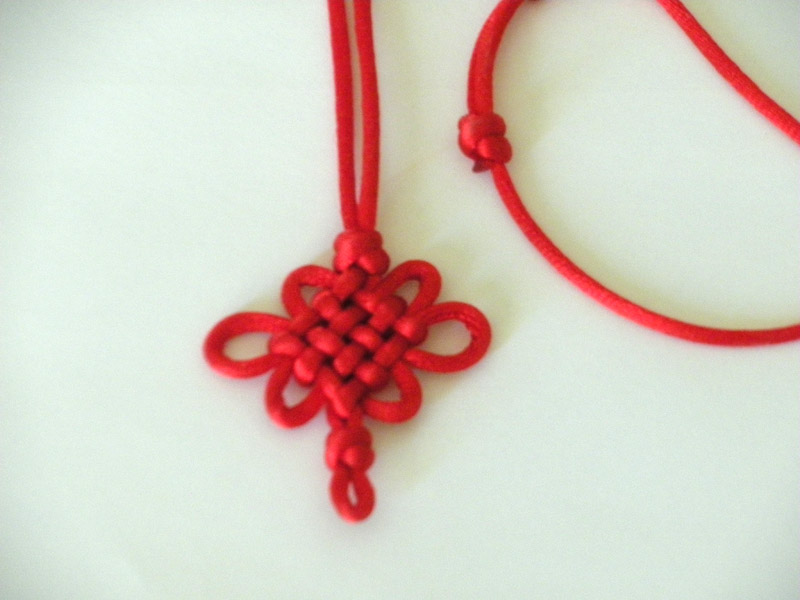
A 4-row panchang knot with cross knots

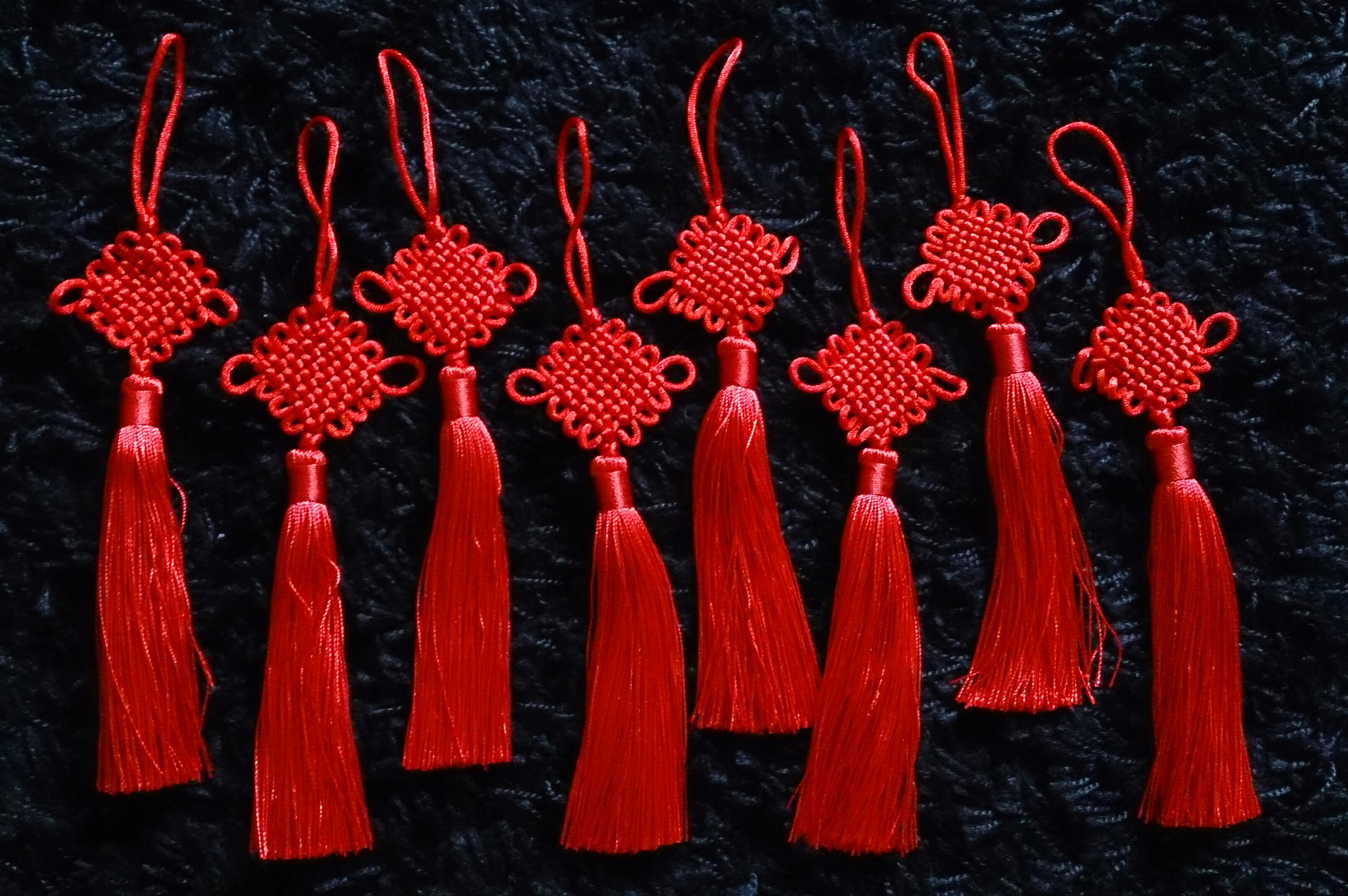

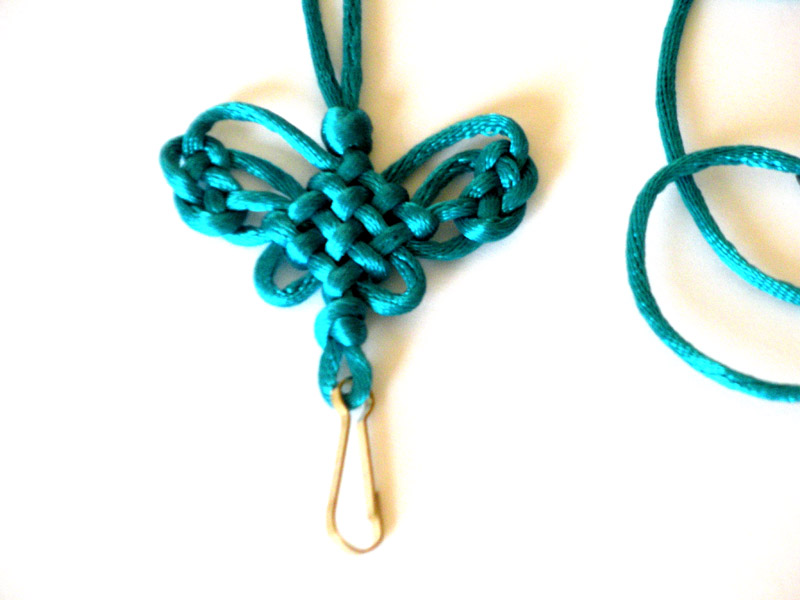

=== Tiger-head shoes ===
Tiger-head shoes (虎头鞋) are an example of traditional Chinese folk handicraft used as footwear for children. Their name comes from the toe cap, which looks like the head of a tiger.

== Musical instruments ==
Bolang gu, a traditional Chinese pellet drum and toy.

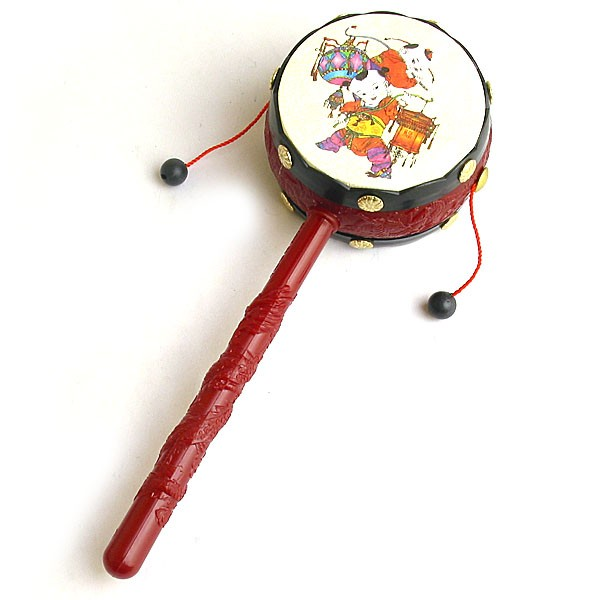

Muyu, a rounded woodblock carved in the shape of a fish, it is played by striking the top with a wooden stick; often used in Buddhist chanting.

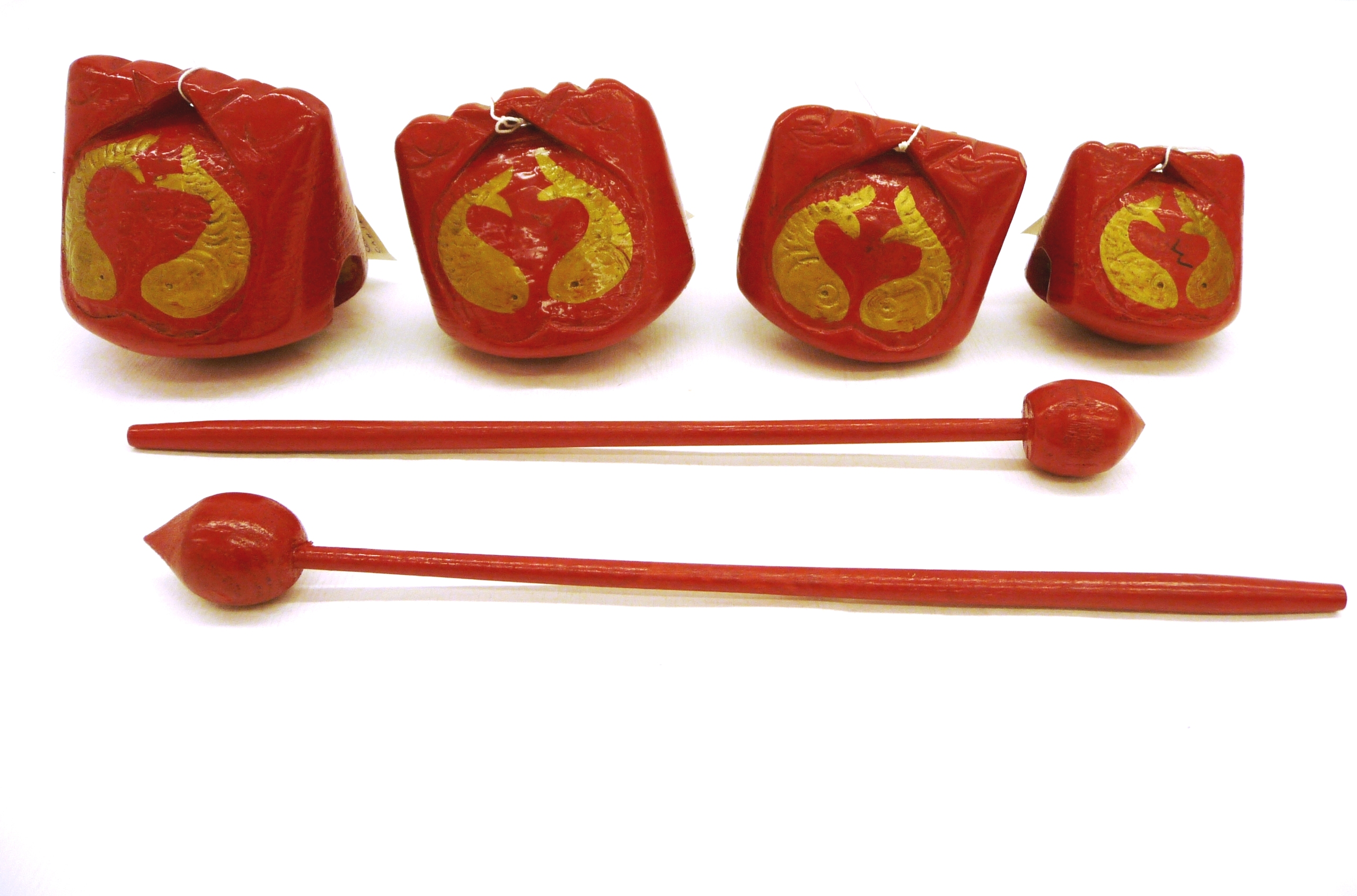

== See also ==
- Chinese art & fine art
- Han culture & Ethnic minorities of China
- Chinese games
