= Liangbatou =

Traditional hairstyle worn by Manchu women

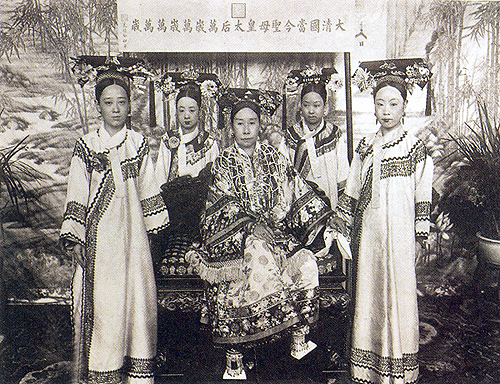
The Qing Empress Dowager Cixi wearing liangbatou

Liangbatou (simplified Chinese: 两把头; traditional Chinese: 两把頭) or erbatou (simplified Chinese: 二把头; traditional Chinese: 二把頭) is a hairstyle/headdress worn by Manchu women. It is a tall headdress that features two handfuls of hair, parted to each side of the head, sometimes with the addition of wire frames, extensions and ornamentation.

Liangbatou was made famous by Empress Dowager Cixi and her Manchu court ladies, becoming popular and evolving starting from the Qing dynasty through the Republican Period (1910–1940s). It was known nationally and internationally for its towering shape and ornamentation, and was influenced by the theatrical representations of non-Chinese ethnicities.

It was used to reveal a woman's social and marital status, and became symbolic of Manchu identity. It was eventually used as imperial propaganda to show support for the Qing dynasty and strengthen Manchu ties.

== History ==
During the 19th century, the Manchu man's queue hairstyle was mocked around the world, and symbolized national shame to anti-Manchuists in China. In contrast, the liangbatou captivated onlookers worldwide. Many were entranced by its size and the fact that it was not seen anywhere else in Asia. One of the most famous images of the liangbatou is shown in the postcard "Manchu Ladies", photographed by John D. Zumbrum. It captures two ladies in Beijing wearing the headpiece while walking down a road.

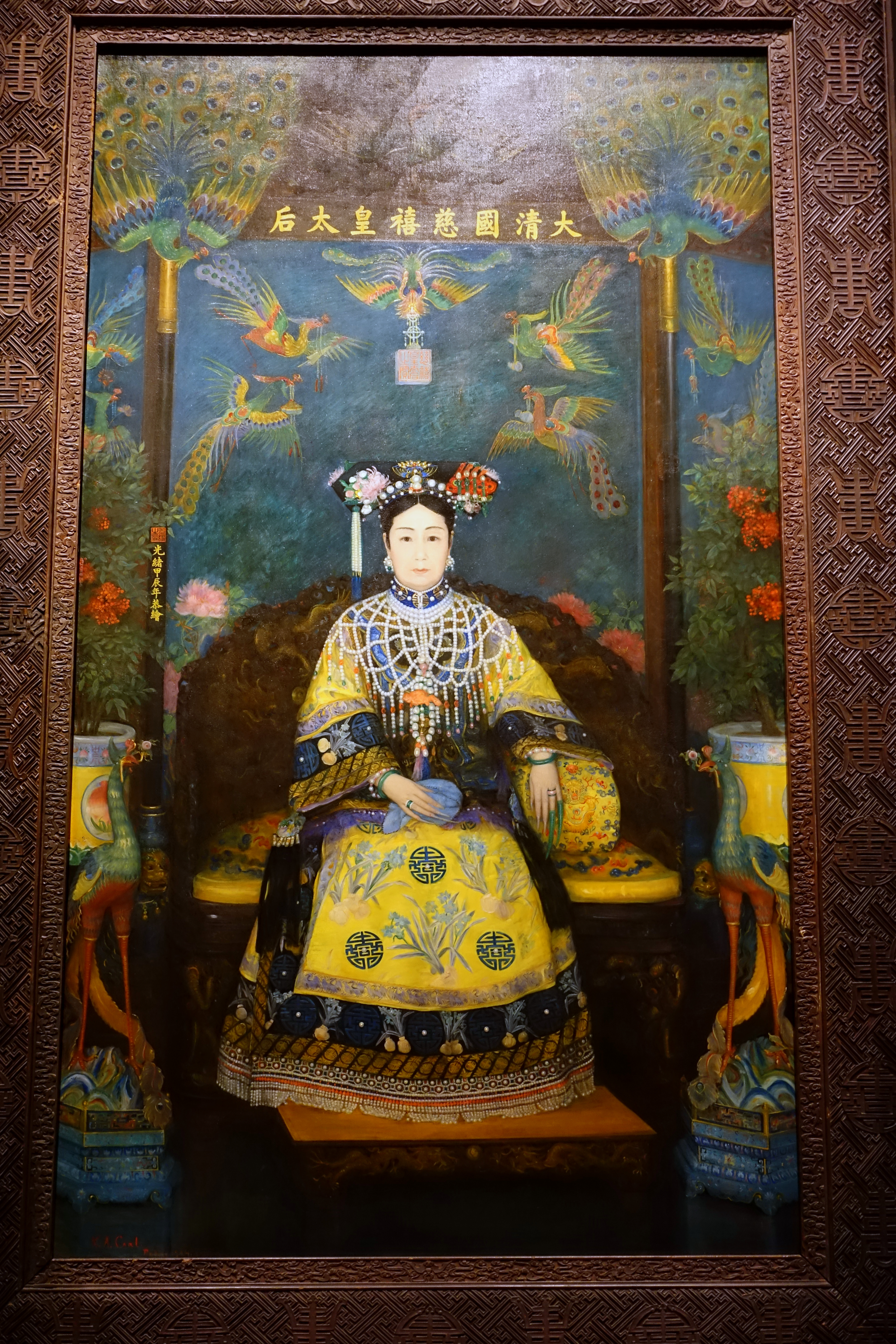
Empress Dowager Cixi wearing liangbatou by Katherine A. Carl (1903)

Scottish photographer John Thomson photographed the hairstyle in 1894. Another known depiction was an unauthorized oil painting of Empress Cixi by Katherine A. Carl. In diplomatic paintings, it evolved from a simple hair arrangement, to reflecting purpose. The practice of wearing the liangbatou to diplomatic functions was started by Cixi and her court ladies. They would wear it paired with ceremonial robes as a satire on political views. It acted as a means of re-consolidation of power in spite of criticism. While the Qing dynasty failed to revive the headdress, it became increasingly popular on stage. Silang Tanmu (Fourth Son Visits his Mother) was the most famous play to feature the liangbatou. The headdress, which was once the Manchu's symbol of power, became a comical prop. In theatrical shows, the image of the liangbatou worn by "boy actresses" served as imperial propaganda.

The liangbatou then began to represent the customs, traditions and desire to reinstate the Qing to power. Unlike its predecessor the queue, the liangbatou became a symbol of the Manchu and continued to attract the curiosity of the population.

== Material and style ==
The liangbatou was originally created by twisting the wearer's hair up and around a flat strip (also known as the bianfang) usually consisting of ivory, wood or precious metal. Eventually, the liangbatou evolved from a hairstyle into a headpiece with added structural components. The hair was held together by silk cording. The satin follows the original direction of the hair. The headdress frame was wrapped with stiffened black satin, which gave it a defined angle and sharp edges. A wire-mesh base was placed atop the wearer's head for support. Because of the additional assistance from the wired frame, styles of the headdress became more decorative and elaborate.

The bianfang began to evolve from function to fashion, allowing higher and wider headpieces that demonstrated social status. Particularly during the Qing dynasty, the headpiece spread into a fan shape that sat on the wearer's head like a flat crown. It featured flowers like the peony and chrysanthemum and silk tassels. Court ladies usually preferred intricate floral arrangements with jade, pearl, coral and other stone. Common women preferred a more demure look that featured inlaid metals and velvet flowers. Hairpins used to attach the headdress often emphasized wealth and beauty. Jade and stone hairpins were usually worn by the wealthy, while commoners donned pins made of silver and bone.

The liangbatou's two styles were the yizitou (Chinese: 一字头) and the dalachi (Chinese: 大拉翅). The simpler yizitou takes after the Chinese character for "one" (Chinese: 一). The more elaborate dalachi is the more elaborate, reflecting the characters for "stretched wings" (Chinese: 拉翅).

== Culture ==
In the eyes of foreign visitors, the liangbatou marked the wearer as Manchu. The liangbatou was distinctly different depending on group, class and region within the multi-ethnic Qing military social organization.

This headdress combined Mongol and Chinese practices of adornment. Manchu women decorated their liangbatou with fresh and artificial flowers that made the headdresses significantly different from the Mongol's, which lacked flowery accessories.

The liangbatou did not appeal to all Chinese women, especially the Han. Cixi had been trying to downplay the difference between Han Chinese and Manchu because of the anti-Manchuist movement. After the Qing dynasty was overthrown in 1911, Manchu women adopted Han style clothing and adopted the Chinese chignon.

== Modern entertainment ==
The Qing dynasty is a popular subject in entertainment and media. Dramas such as Legend of Zhen Huan (2011) and My Fair Princess – Huan Zhu Ge Ge (1998) spread knowledge of the look of royal court ladies.

Other period dramas featuring this headdress include The Story of Yanxi Palace and Ruyi's Royal Love in the Palace. These productions often used the styling of the liangbatou to define the characters. For example, in Ruyi's Royal Love in the Palace, Ruyi, the main character and later Empress, wears a simple liangbatou on first entering the Forbidden City. As the plot develops, her personality changes and she rises in rank, reflected by her liangbatou becoming more expensive, complex and dramatic.

== See also ==
- Kokoshnik
