= Manchu platform shoes =

Footwear worn by Chinese Manchu women

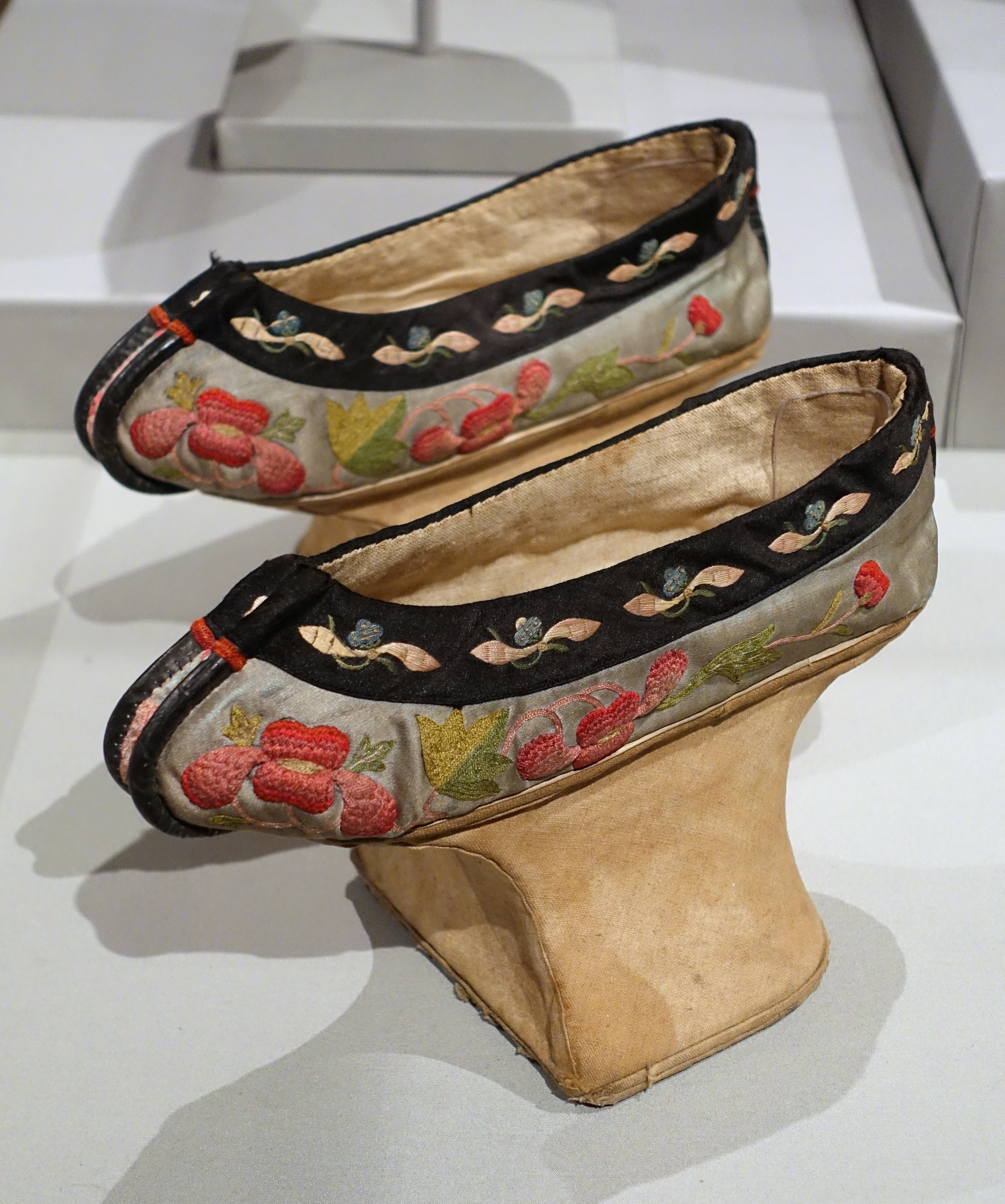
Shoes for a Manchu noblewoman, China, Qing dynasty, mid-1800s AD, silk, wood; from the Textile Museum, George Washington University

Chinese Manchu platform shoes refers to the traditional high platform shoes worn by Manchu women which appeared in the early Qing dynasty and continued to be worn even in the late Qing dynasty. It is a type of Qixie (Chinese: 旗鞋; lit. 'Manchu shoes'), Manchu shoes, which forms part of the Qizhuang, the traditional attire of the Manchu people. Depending on its styles of its, the Manchu platform shoes could be classified as gaodixie (Chinese: 高底鞋), which were high-heeled shoes, and yuanbaodi (Chinese: 元宝底), which were typically low-heeled shoes.

The gaodixie could be further divided into the huāpénxié (花盆鞋; 'flowerpot shoes'), also known as huāpéndǐ (花盆底), huapendixie (花盆底鞋) or commonly referred as flowerpot shoes in English, and the mǎtí xié (馬蹄鞋; 'horsehoof shoes'), also known as matidixie (馬蹄底鞋), which is commonly referred as horse hoof-tread shoes or horse-hoof shoes in English.

== Construction and design ==
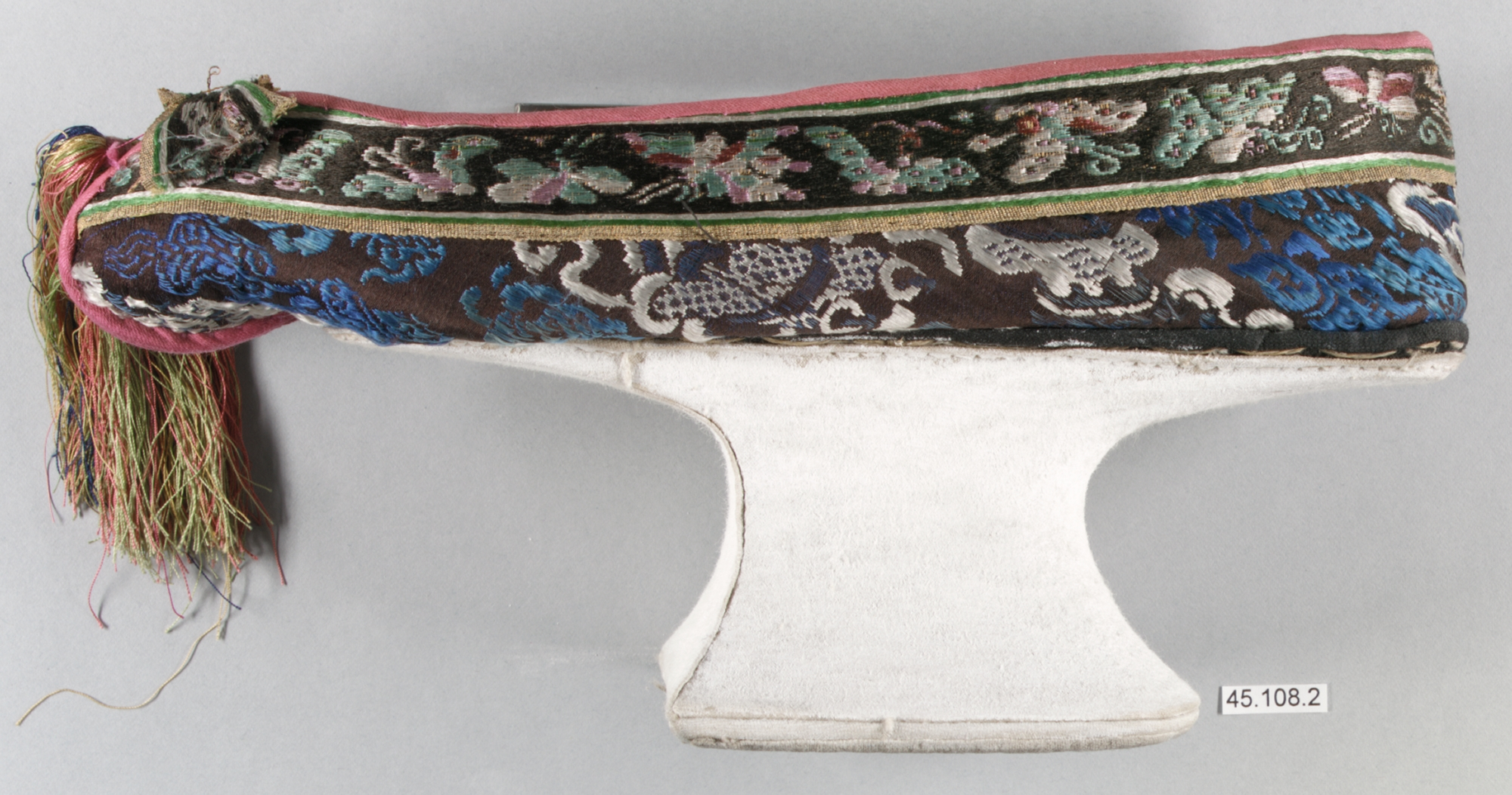
Manchu Woman's matixie; the upper region is made of fabric while the lower region is made of wood.

=== Materials ===
The lower portion of the shoe was a high platform heel which was made out of wood while the upper portion shoe was made of fabric. The sole was padded with several layers of cotton which could have allowed the shoes to be worn indoor or only when there were special events. The right and the left were interchangeable.

=== Shapes ===
- The huapenxie was in the shape of flowerpot. The shoe had thick soles which would reduce in thickness at the toe and the heel regions.
- The matixie was horse-hoof in shape. The shoes were elevated with a piece of wood with concave sides which were attached to the soles of the shoe.

== History ==
Making shoes out of wood has been a tradition craft by the ancestors of the Manchu. According to folk stories, the thick-soled shoe first appeared when a goddess decided to keep off insects and dust when she faced a situation where she had to walk in the mud. Another legend associate the creation of the platform shoes to Princess Duoluo Ganzhu who ordered her soldiers to use wooden stilts to cross the marshes; this invention allowed the soldiers to launch a surprise attack and to win their capital back. Since then, Manchu women wore the high, stilt-like platform shoes.

When the Manchu conquered China in the Qing dynasty, they forbade Manchu women from binding their feet like the Han Chinese women. It is sometimes suggested that the Manchu platforms shoes were used to imitate the gait of the Han Chinese women with bound feet. However, it is also suggested that the use of high platform shoes is not influenced by the Han Chinese but the results of the living conditions adaptation in the Northeast regions.

In the early Qing dynasty, both the huapenxie and the matixie appeared. In the mid 19th century, the Manchu women's set of attire was composed of the high platform shoe, the Manchu robe, and the liangbatou. In the late Qing dynasty, Manchu women eventually did practice some kind of loose foot binding, called liutiaojiao (lit. 'willow branch feet') for a short duration of time (only 1 month) in order to compress the feet in a narrow, knife-like shape under the influence of the Han Chinese.

== Gallery ==
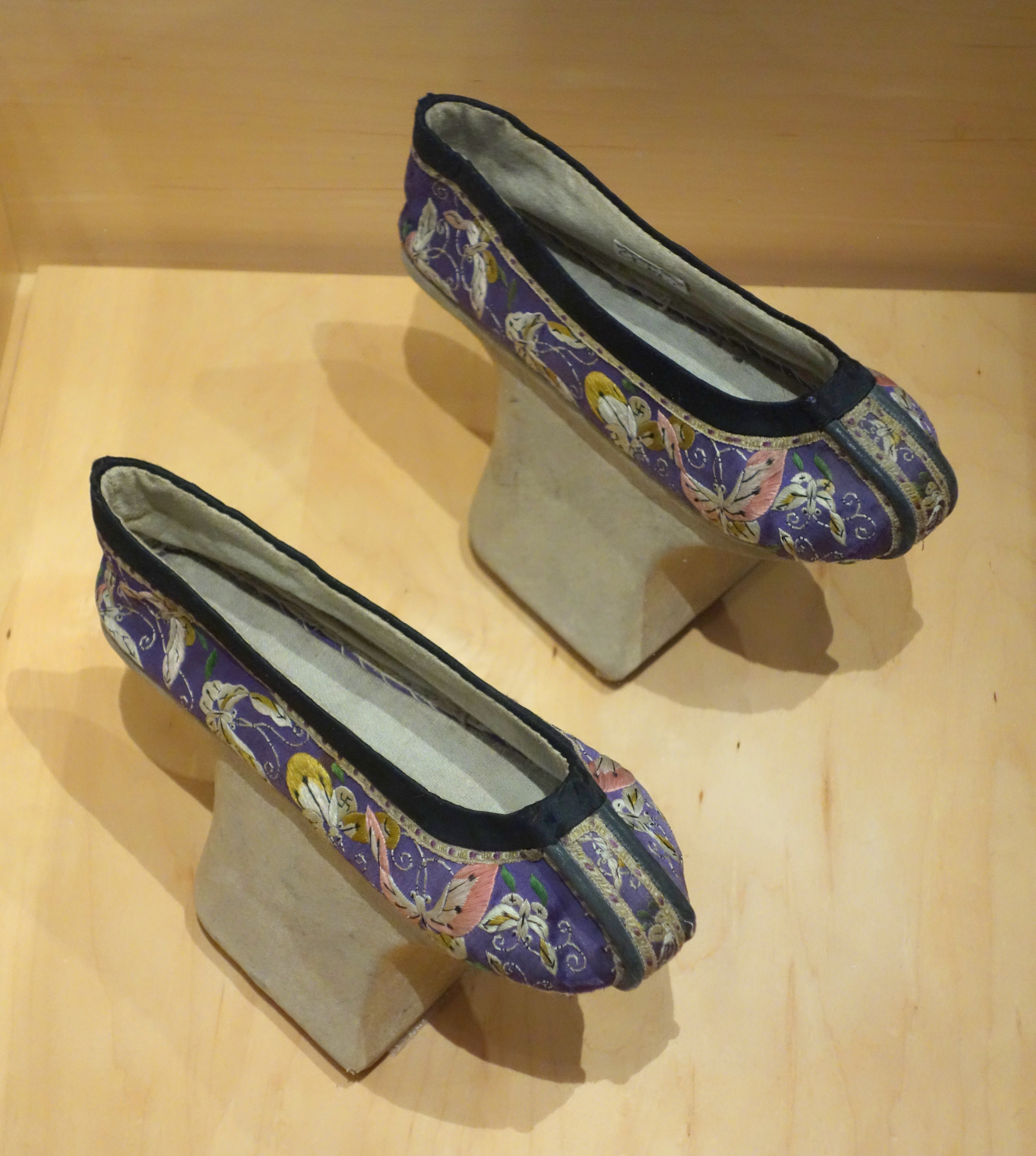

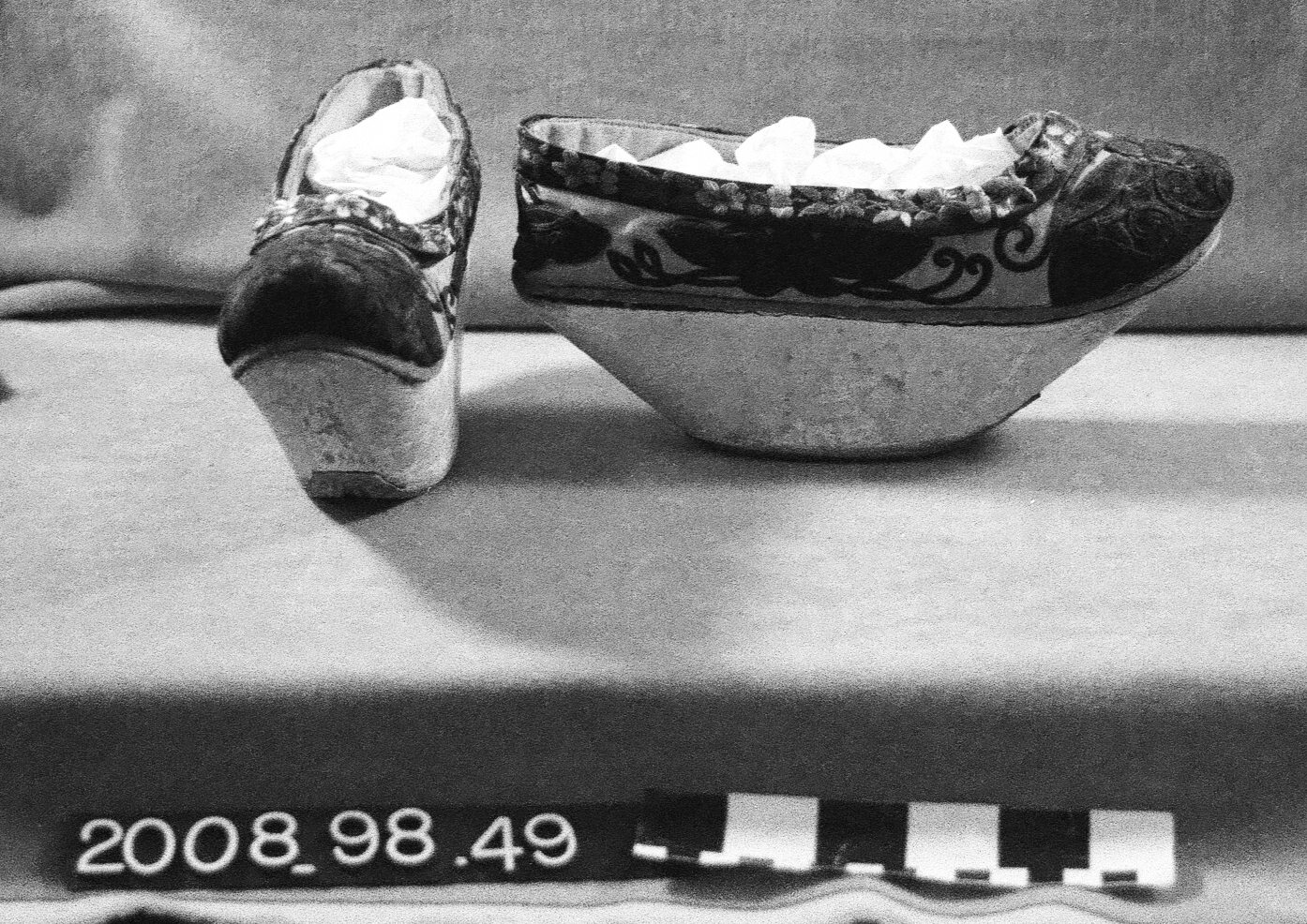

== See also ==
- List of shoe styles
- Cheongsam
- Chinese clothing
- Hanfu
- Liangbatou
- Qizhuang – Manchu clothing
