= Tiger-head shoes =

Traditional Chinese folk handicraft used as footwear for children

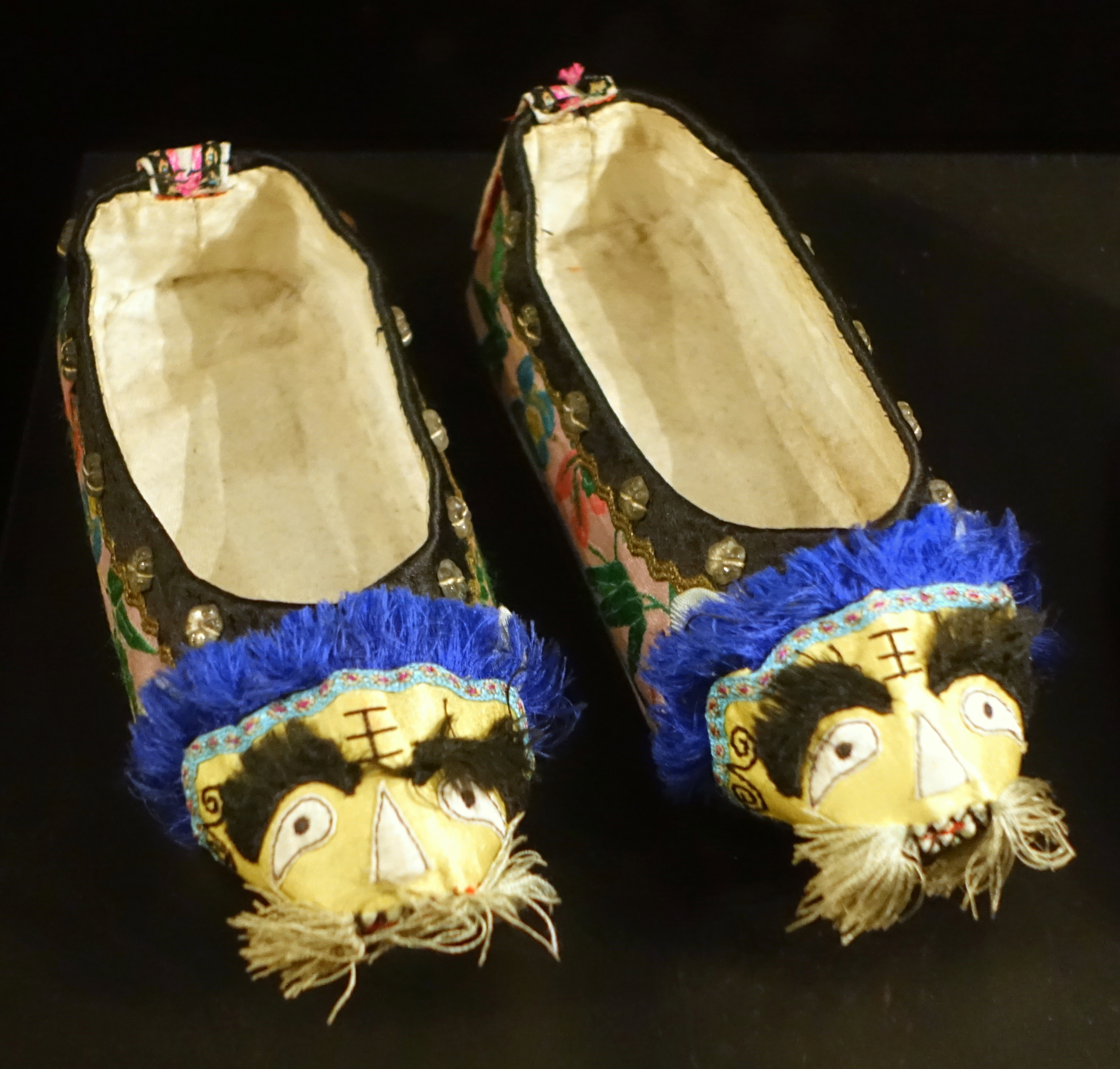
Tiger-head shoes, Qing dynasty, 1800s AD

Tiger-head shoes (Chinese: 虎头鞋) are an example of traditional Chinese folk handicraft used as footwear for children. Their name comes from the toe cap, which looks like the head of a tiger. In the North of China, people also call them cat-head shoes. In Chinese culture, tigers are regarded as auspicious; people embroider the head and the upper of the shoes with tiger or tiger-head patterns, in the hope that their children will become as robust and dynamic as tigers. Also, the vivid image of tiger-head pattern was thought to expel evil spirits to protect their children from diseases and disasters. It is a complicated work to make tiger-head shoes, there are many delicate stitch work such as embroidery, or weaving simply on the head of the shoes. The vamp (upper part of the shoe) is mainly coloured in red and yellow, and residents usually use thick lines to draw the outline of the mouth, eyebrow, nose and the eyes of the tiger to express its power in an exaggerated way.

== Legends ==
The origins of tiger-head shoes are unknown, but there are several folk legends about them. Tiger-head shoes are marked by the practice of exorcising evil spirits. The following is one of the legends:

Long long ago, there was a lady who has clever hands and good sense. She was very gifted in embroidery, so that her child was always well dressed. One night, a monster came to the village and caught all the children there except her son. From then people began to realize that the shoes the child wearing were decorated with a tiger’s head at the front which scared the monster, thus leaving the child safe. Therefore, people began to imitate this practice.

== Region distribution ==
Tiger-head shoes are popular in North China, especially in Hebei, Henan, Shandong, Shanxi and Shaanxi provinces. Different areas have formed different ways of making tiger-head shoes. In the southern part of Hebei province, the embroidery type is most well-known.

== Culture ==
In Chinese culture, the tiger is seen as sturdy and mighty with the title of "king of the beasts". Thus, when it is mentioned, people will naturally feel a sense of power and fright. As a result, the expressions concerning tiger, such as the tiger's roar (Chinese: 虎啸; pinyin: huxiao), its frightful appearance (Chinese: 虎威; pinyin: huwei), and the phrase "vigorous as a tiger" (Chinese: 虎虎有生气; pinyin: huhuyoushengqi) came into being, along with worship of the creature.

"When a child is growing up, he would come across a series of accidents or even calamities caused by nature or society. These accidents and calamities need to be conquered, so that the child can grow up healthily. Therefore, he is expected to become burly, dignified, and vigorous like a tiger, and possess all the inner qualities of a tiger as well. One major embodiment of this hope is to embroider the patterns of a tiger's heads on shoe toes and uppers."

— Nanjing Local History

In other words, tiger or tiger-head patterns are used to exorcise evil spirits and accelerate the "tigerous temperament" of a child.

== See also ==
- Hanfu
- List of shoe styles
