= Lotus shoe =

Chinese shoes for women with bound feet

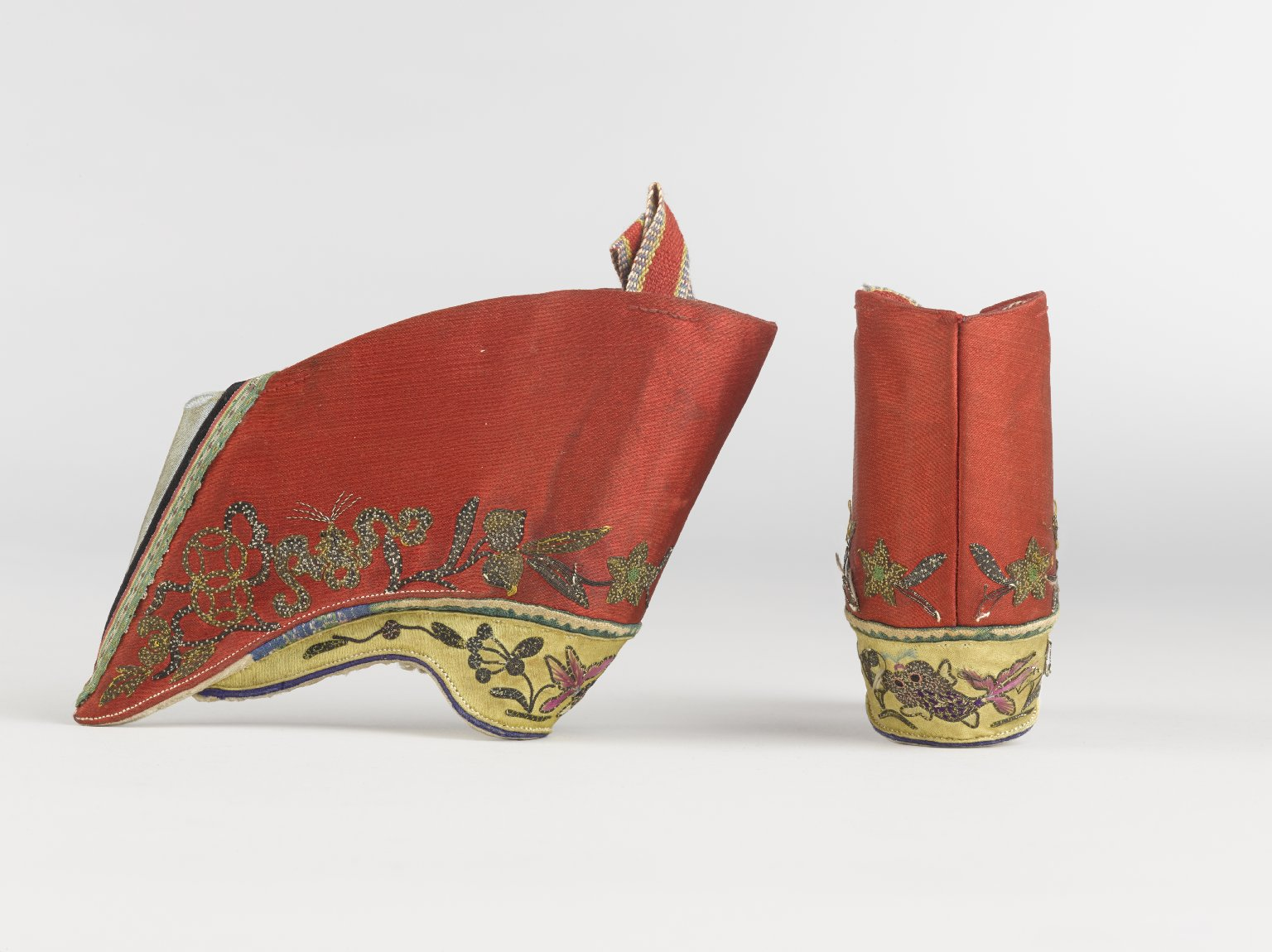
Pair of shoes for women's bound feet, 19th century. Brooklyn Museum

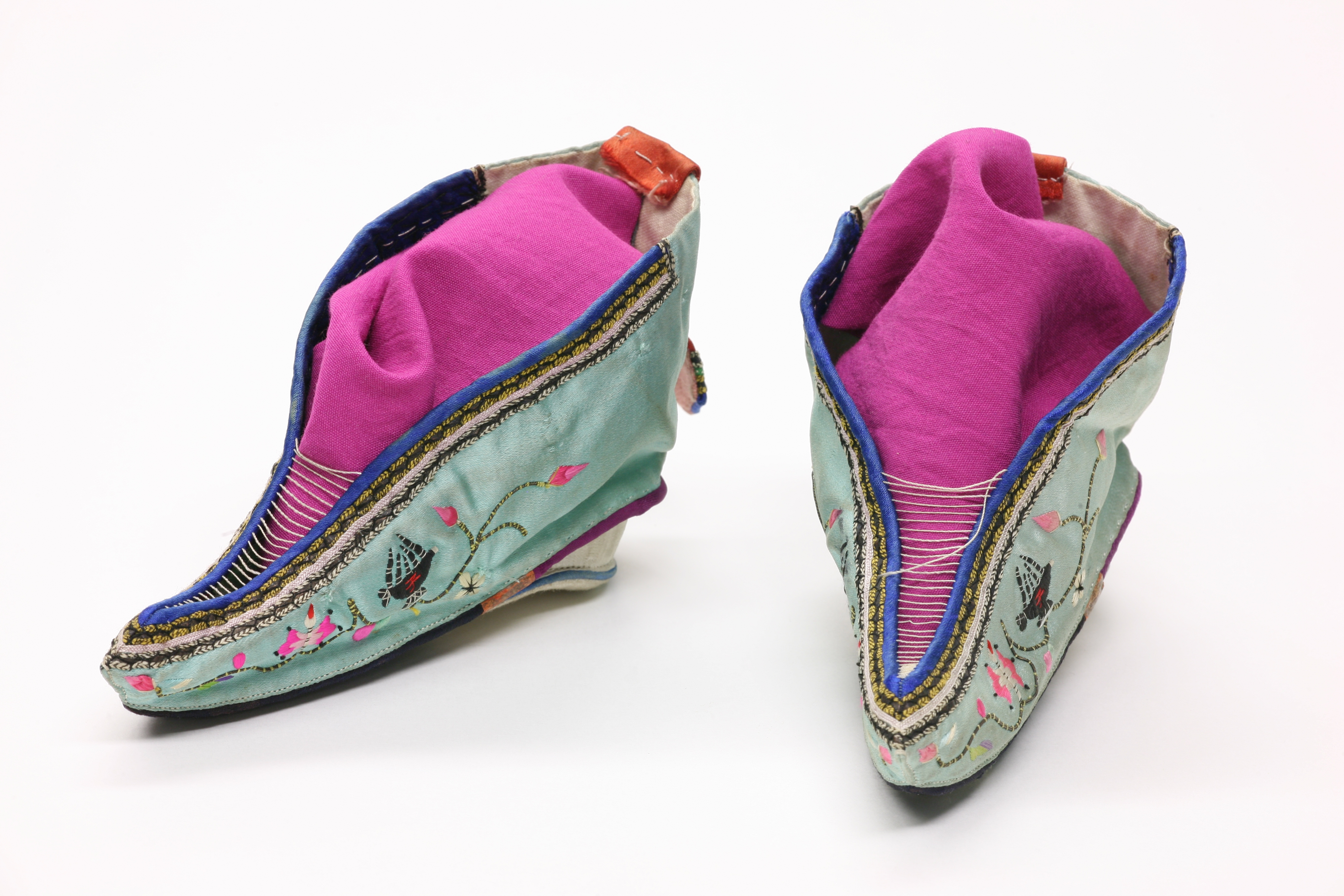
Lotus shoes

Lotus shoes (simplified Chinese: 莲履; traditional Chinese: 蓮履; pinyin: liánlǚ) are footwear that were worn by women in China who had bound feet.

== Design ==
The shoes are cone or sheath-shaped, intended to resemble a lotus bud. The size of lotus shoes was between 13.3 and 14.0 centimetres (5.25 and 5.5 in) in length and 4.4–5.1 centimetres (1.75–2 in) in width. Until the early 1900s, lotus shoes were primarily made in the home by the women who wore them. They were delicately constructed from cotton or silk, and small enough to fit in the palm of a hand. Shoes that did not have wooden, leather, or metal parts could be made entirely in the home. Women used scissors, needle and thread, bamboo embroidery frames, awls, and small irons to make their shoes. Some designs had heels or wedge-shaped soles. Outdoor shoes often had a wooden heel or sole, which were constructed outside of the home by male carpenters. There were regional variations in wooden sole shape. In the south, wooden heels were low and coin-shaped, while soles in the north were arched.

Lotus shoes were made in different styles and colors, and were typically ornately decorated, with embroidered designs of animals or flowers that could continue on the sole of the shoe. In addition, lotus shoes were often decorated with images that symbolize good luck, as well as culturally significant puns. Shoe color choices were dictated by age and occasion. Young women typically wore purple and bright green shoes, while middle-aged women wore blue-grey or blue-green shoes. The color black was associated with bruising and was therefore an unpopular shoe color, except among older women. The color red, a symbol of virtue, was reserved for special occasions such as weddings, anniversaries, and New Year celebrations. Some designs only fit over the tip of the foot, giving the illusion of a small bound foot when worn under a long skirt. The designs and stylistic choices of lotus shoes varied depending on factors such as regional cultures, local traditions, and economic conditions.

The practice of footbinding was the intense swaddling of feet. This painful process forced the four smaller toes under the big toe and encased the foot in a high arch. Lotus shoes could result in permanent damage to tendons and ligaments in the foot. The process of altering one's foot often was urged on young girls and took years to fully finish. The damage to women's feet was irreversible and affected mobility. There was a fair amount of backlash to this tradition by missionaries and Chinese reformists. However, women continued to wear lotus shoes until around the 1950s. Evidence shows this tradition was prevalent for nearly a thousand years.

Footbinding had an olfactory and medicinal component; women would dust alum powder, an astringent, between their toes before wrapping their feet in handwoven cloth binders. They would also dust the binding cloth and shoe lining with fragrant powder. Women also used powdered herbal tonics with formulas passed down intergenerationally to soften their bones or speed up the healing process. These medicinal powders were especially common to use for girls commencing the foot binding process.

== Prevalence ==
The practice of footbinding was not unique to elite or urban populations, it was also widespread among rural women. Yet, the experience and practice of footbinding were class and region-specific. The age at which girls began foot binding ranged from five to eight years old. Footbinding impaired mobility, which restricted the capacity to perform physical labor. Families that could afford to lose a daughter's capacity for strenuous physical labor began footbinding at a younger age. This meant that the age at which footbinding commenced was inversely proportional to class, where upper-class girls’ physical labor was more expendable than it was to lower-class families. Yet, the practice of foot binding did not signal an end to a woman's economic productivity. Rather, for women and girls in the relatively poor region of Shanxi province, footbinding served the dual purpose of pushing women into the sedentary work of spinning and weaving, while also showcasing a woman's domestic handiwork, making her a more attractive bride.

Lotus shoes and the practice of footbinding had the connotation of being connected to sexuality. However, this practice was more closely related to values like modesty, virtue, and morality. These shoes were frequently outlets for a woman's identity at the time. Women were often weavers and worked with textiles. They were commended for their productivity, which was shown in practices such as the creation of lotus shoes. In this regard, lotus shoes were a source of pride and value. Evolution would show that the tradition transformed from one that originated with women's old desire of embellishment, and took on a new meaning. Women were able to change the way footbinding was seen and instead connected it to their work and family.

The tradition of footbinding shows the relationship between women and their bodies at this time. Lotus shoes were a way for women to alter their bodies for public perception. This illusion of a smaller foot was wanted by women, and when achieved was celebrated. This tradition shows what women put themselves and their bodies through for their culture.

Though foot binding is no longer practiced, many lotus shoes survive as artifacts in museums or private collections.

== See also ==
- List of shoe styles
- Foot fetishism
- Shoe fetishism
- Ballet boot
